= Armenian cultural heritage in Azerbaijan =

Armenian cultural heritage in Azerbaijan refers to historic buildings and cultural traditions of Armenians who lived in what today conforms to the territory of Azerbaijan. Armenians had a presence in what is now Azerbaijan going back to at least the 2nd century BC in Nakhchivan, which was part of the new Kingdom of Armenia established by Artaxias I. Armenians also had presence in Baku dating back to the 7th century AD. Prior to the Karabakh Movement and the ensuing First Nagorno-Karabakh War, about 500,000 Armenians lived in Soviet Azerbaijan where they had an active cultural presence. Most Armenians fled during the war and their numbers in Azerbaijan today is less than 1% of their pre-war figures. After the ceasefire of the First Nagorno-Karabakh War, there has been a marked increase of Anti-Armenian sentiment in Azerbaijan coupled with reports about destruction of Armenian cultural monuments there. After the First Nagorno-Karabakh War, there has been no significant cultural activity of Armenians in Azerbaijan outside of Nagorno-Karabakh.

== Armenian communities in Azerbaijan ==
Armenians communities in Azerbaijan are the Armenians who lived in great numbers in the modern state of Azerbaijan and its precursor, Soviet Azerbaijan. About 500,000 Armenians lived in Soviet Azerbaijan prior to the outbreak of the Karabakh Movement in 1988 and the ensuing First Nagorno-Karabakh War.

Apart from Nagorno Karabakh, Armenians historically lived in Baku, Nakhchivan, Sumgait and Ganja. They have build churches, cemeteries, schools and left a rich cultural heritage that has been largely destroyed.

=== Nagorno-Karabakh ===
The cultural heritage of Artsakh (Nagorno-Karabakh) comprises extensive tangible and intangible Armenian-associated traditions, especially religious and civil architecture, fortifications, inscriptions, and related arts, concentrated in a landscape described as exceptionally rich in monuments. In Nagorno-Karabakh there are around 500 historical sites with about 6000 Armenian monuments. Regional artistic development broadly follows major phases of Armenian art—from pre-Christian traditions through early Christianization and a medieval peak—while expressing itself most prominently in ecclesiastical complexes (churches, monasteries, chapels) closely tied to the Armenian Apostolic Church.

Architectural practice generally aligns with wider Armenian building principles, favoring limestone cores faced with cut stone or tuff, and includes characteristic monastic forms such as the gavit, with major thirteenth-century centers at Dadivank, Gandzasar, and Gtichavank. Artsakh also preserves distinctive categories of material culture, including Iron Age anthropomorphic idols, inscribed border stones (sahmanakars), khachkars, lapidary Armenian inscriptions, limited but significant fresco cycles (notably at Dadivank), and an important tradition of illuminated manuscripts and carpet weaving, including inscribed rugs.

Around 180 BC, Artsakh became one of the 15 provinces of the Armenian Kingdom and remained so until the 4th century. While formally having the status of a province (nahang), Artsakh possibly formed a principality on its own – like Armenia's province of Syunik. Other theories suggest that Artsakh was a royal land, belonging directly to the king of Armenia. King Tigran the Great of Armenia (who ruled from 95 to 55 BC) founded in Artsakh one of four cities named Tigranakert after himself. The ruins of the ancient Tigranakert, located 50 km (30 mi) north-east of Stepanakert, are being studied by a group of international scholars. Armenian culture and civilization flourished in the early medieval Nagorno-Karabakh.

In the 5th century, the first-ever Armenian school was opened on the territory of modern Nagorno-Karabakh at Amaras Monastery through the efforts of St. Mesrop Mashtots, the inventor of the Armenian alphabet. St. Mesrop was very active in preaching the Gospel in Artsakh and Utik. Overall, Mesrop Mashtots made three trips to Artsakh and Utik, ultimately reaching pagan territories at the foothills of the Greater Caucasus. The 7th-century Armenian linguist and grammarian Stephanos Syunetsi stated in his work that Armenians of Artsakh had their own dialect, and encouraged his readers to learn it. The principal expression of Artsakh's art in the Middle Ages was through ecclesiastical architecture: churches, cathedrals, chapels and monasteries. Most other forms of art in that period, including illuminated manuscripts, khachkars (Armenian: խաչքար; unique-to-Armenia stone slabs with engraved crosses) and mural paintings were likewise tied to Artsakh's religious life and its primary institution—the Armenian Apostolic Church.

=== Baku ===
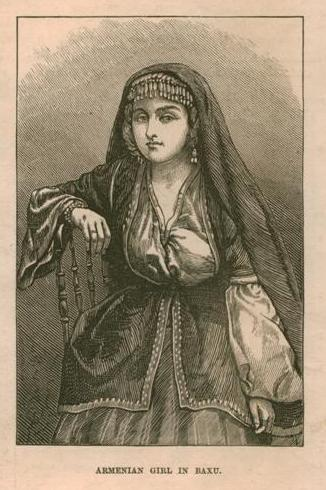
Armenian girl in Baku from an 1873 publication of The Illustrated London News

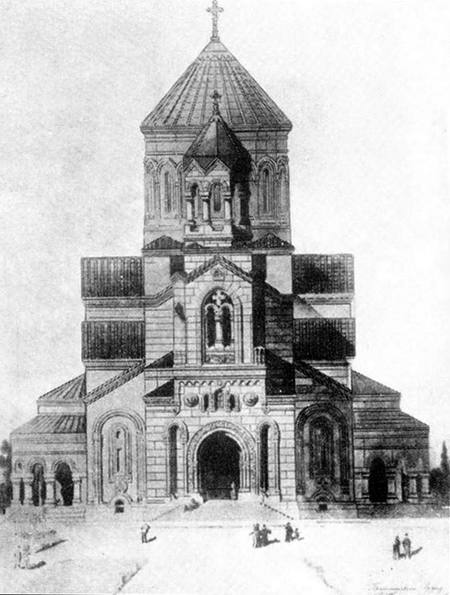
Saint Thaddeus and Bartholomew Armenian Cathedral of Baku, opened in 1910 but destroyed in the 1930s

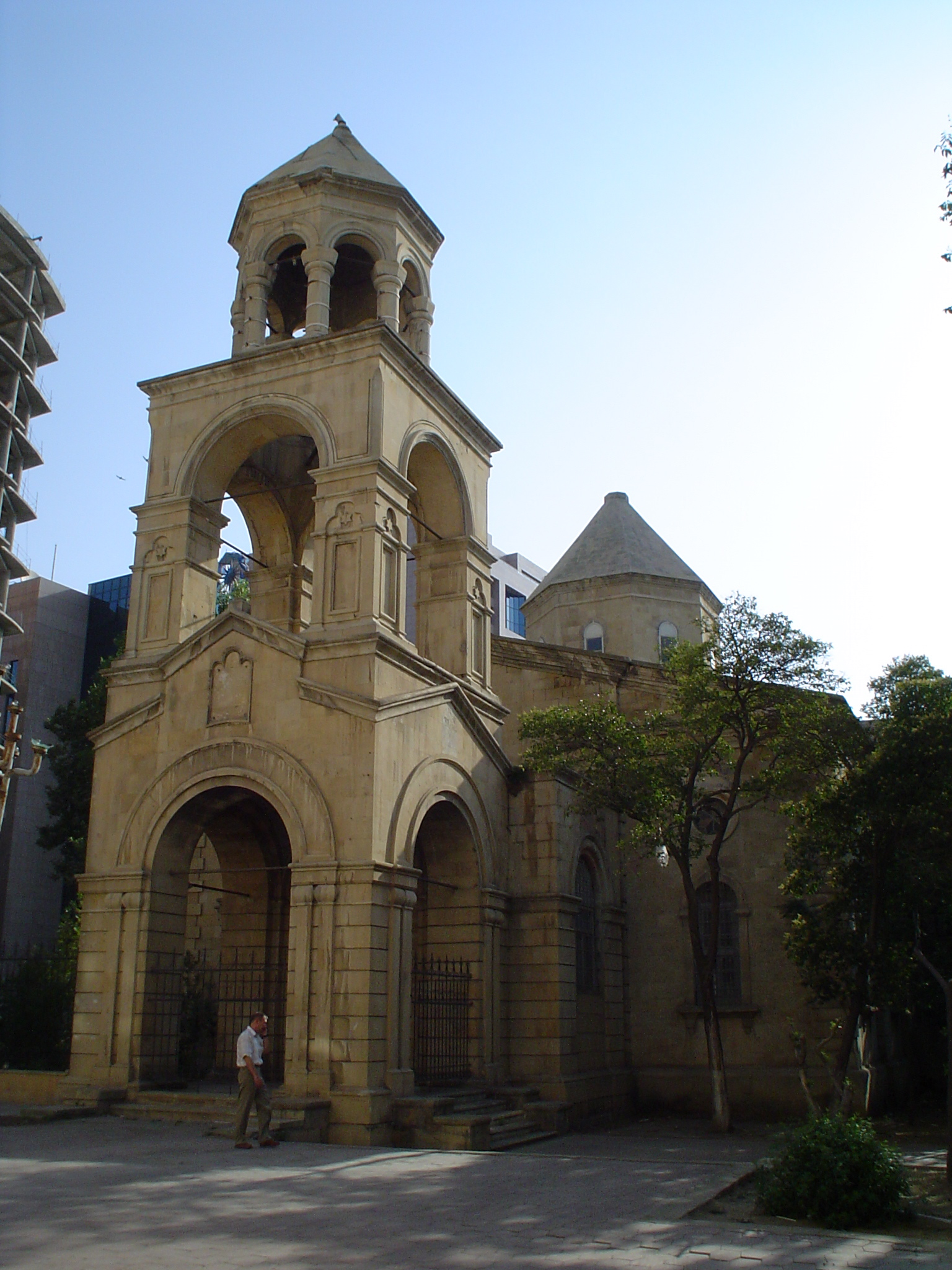
St. Gregory the Illuminator's Church in Baku (currently non-functioning)

In the 7th century Armenian philosopher, mathematician, geographer, astronomer and alchemist Anania Shirakatsi in his most famous work Ashkharhatsuyts (Geography) listed Alti-Bagavan as one of the 12 districts of the Province Paytakaran (one of the 15 Provinces of Armenia), which linguist and orientalist Kerovbe Patkanov in his translation identifies as Baku.

Orientalist and academician Vasily Bartold referring to the 15th century Persian historian Hamdallah Mustawfi, speaks about the existence of an old Armenian church in Baku Many Armenians in Baku lived in the old city's Armenian quarter called Ermenikend (Armenian: Արմենիքենդ; Azerbaijani: Ermənikənd; Russian: Арменикенд, literally "Armenian village" in Azerbaijani) was a district located in the Nasimi raion of Baku, where many Armenians lived., and took up jobs as merchants, industrial managers and government administrators. Officially the district was part of a larger district named "Shahumyan" after the Armenian Bolshevik leader Stepan Shaumyan who lived in Baku.

Armenians established a community in the city with churches, schools, and was the scene of a lively literary culture. They formed a sizeable community in Baku, following a large influx of Armenians upon the city's incorporation into the Russian Empire in 1806. The Armenian population increased further when Baku became a major center for oil production and offered other economic opportunities to enterprising investors and businessmen. Following the Sovietisation of Azerbaijan, Armenians managed to reestablish a large and vibrant community in Baku made up of skilled professionals, craftsmen and intelligentsia and integrated into the political, economic and cultural life of Azerbaijan. The Armenians were the second most numerous group in the judiciary.

During the Soviet period, Armenians of Baku were part of a multiethnic Russian-speaking urban subculture to which ethnic identity began losing grounds and with which post-World War II generations of urbanized Bakuvians regardless of their ethnic origin or religious affiliations tended to identify. By the 1980s, the Armenian community of Baku had become largely Russified.

The large scale construction and expansion of the city attracted numerous Russian and Armenian architects, many of whom had received their education in Russia (in particular, Saint Petersburg) or other parts of Europe. Prominent Armenian architects included Hovhannes Katchaznouni, Freidun Aghalyan, Vardan Sarkisov, and Gavriil Ter-Mikelov. Many of the buildings they designed, influenced by Neo-Classical themes then popular in Russia and also styles and motifs taken from medieval Armenian Church Architecture, still stand today. Among the most well known examples are the Azerbaijan State Philharmonic Hall and the Commercial College of Baku (both designed by Ter-Mikelov).

The Saint Thaddeus and Bartholomew Cathedral, built in 1906–1907, was destroyed in the 1930s. The Church of the Holy Virgin, which had not been functioning since 1984 due to falling in severe disrepair, was demolished in the early 1990s. The St. Gregory Illuminator Church was set aflame during the pogrom of 1990, but was restored in 2004 during a renovation and was transformed into the archive department of the Department of Administration Affairs of the Presidential Administration of Azerbaijan. During a visit of Armenian Apostolic Church's Catholicos Karekin II to Baku in 2010, he witnessed all traces of the Armenian history in the church being removed including the bells, altar, baptistery, and frescoes.

During the Imperial Russian period, the community enjoyed a vibrant literary culture, as seen in the publication of dozens of Armenian-language newspapers, journals, and magazines. The first Armenian periodical to be published in Baku, in 1877, was Haykakan Ashkharh (The Armenian World), a literary and pedagogic journal established and edited by Stephannos Stephaney, while other popular Armenian periodicals included Aror (The Plough), an illustrated calendar published from 1893–1896, Sotsial Demokrat (The Social-Democrat), an economic-political-public journal, with editors V. Marsyan and Lazo at its helm, Banvori Dzayn (The Voice of the Laborer, 1906, with Sarkis Kasyan as the editor), and Lusademin (At the Dawn), a literary collection published from 1913-14 by A. Alshushyan.

The Armenian Community of Baku had also built the first Philanthropic Society of Azerbaijan or Mardasirakan, maintaining the then-richest library of Transcaucasia, but then was shut down by the Soviet Government.

All the Armenians fled the city between 1988 and January 1990 and only 50,000 Armenians remained in 1990 compared to a quarter million in 1988. The Baku pogrom, which broke out on 12 January 1990, lasting for seven days during which many Armenians were beaten, tortured or murdered, and their apartments raided, robbed or burned, resulted in the flight of almost all of the Armenians from the city and marked the effective end of the Armenian community of Baku. As a result of the pogrom, 90 Armenians were killed.

Notable Armenians from the Baku area include the writer Shirvanzade, actress Armen Ohanian, comedian Yevgeny Petrosyan, composer Artemi Ayvazyan who founded the Armenian State Jazz Orchestra, composer Alexey Ekimyan, and Armenian-American pianist and composer Andrey Kasparov. Animator Robert Sahakyants, considered the father of Armenian animation was also born in Baku to Armenian parents.

Many Armenian chess grandmasters were also born in Baku, including the famous Garry Kasparov, Melikset Khachiyan, Elina Danielian and Vladimir Akopian.

=== Nakhchivan ===
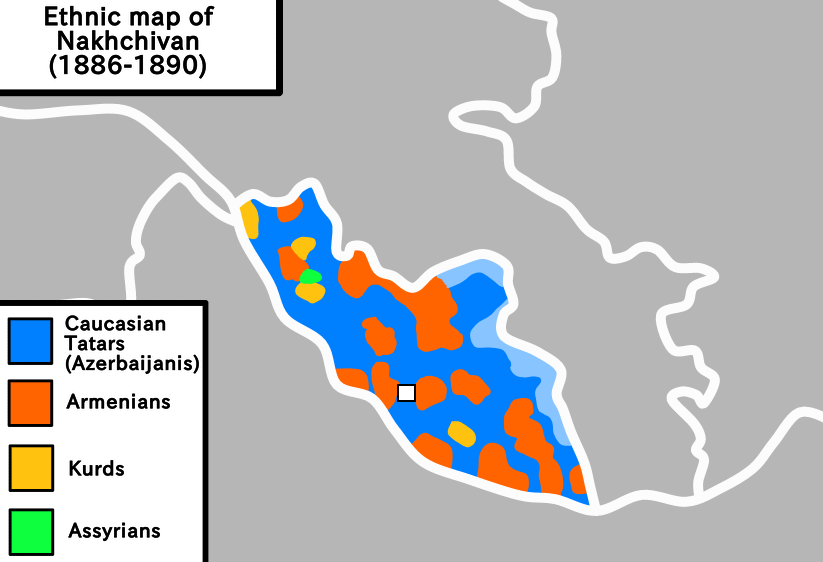
Ethnic map of Nakhchivan in 1886-1890

Armenians had a historic presence in Nakhchivan. As per the Armenian tradition, Nakhchivan was founded by Noah, of the Abrahamic religions. It became part of Satrapy of Armenia under Achaemenid Persia c. 521 BC. In 189 BC. According to historian Faustus of Byzantium (4th century), when the Sassanid Persians invaded Armenia, Sassanid King Shapur II (310-380) removed thousands of Armenians from Nakhchivan between 360-370, indicating the established presence of Armenians in the region during that time. During the Soviet era, Nakhchivan saw a significant demographic shift. The Armenian population saw a great reduction in their numbers throughout the years repatriating to Armenia. Nakhchivan's Armenian population gradually decreased to around 0%.

The Medieval Armenian cemetery of Jugha (Julfa) in Nakhchivan, with its medieval Armenian headstones called khachkars (2,000 were still extant in the 1980s), was destroyed in 2006. The European Parliament passed a resolution in February 2006, condemning the destruction of the cemetery, but its delegation has not been allowed to visit the site itself.

Nakhchivan was home to many Armenians artists and intellectuals such as the Hovnatanian family, Manuk Abeghian, Argam Aivanian, as well as parents of famous Armenian composer Aram Khachaturian were born in the villages of Lower Aza and Upper Aza, though Khachaturian himself was born in Tbilisi.

The town of Agulis, which has been historically inhabited by Armenians, and its cathedral were destroyed by the Azerbaijani military from 1997 until recently.

The Saint Thomas Monastery, a 13th-century Armenian monastery in Agulis was a famous house of worship to Armenians living in the city. It was destroyed by Turkish troops in 1918, when they attacked the town of Agulis and killed its inhabitants. There currently is a mosque in the site of the monastery. Similarly, the Mausoleum of Noah has been constructed on the site of an ancient Armenian cemetery.

A medieval Armenian monastery called Surp Karapet built in 1381 over the ruins of a previous church, was located in Abrakunis. It stood intact but in a state of disrepair until shortly before 2005, when it was demolished by Azerbaijan. In 2013, a mosque was built in the site. The 12th century Armenian church of Surb Hakob in Shorot has also been demolished by 2005.

=== Shamakhi ===
Armenian woman from Shamakhi, by D. E. Yermakov, 1870s

Shamakhi has long had a significant Armenian population with Armenians forming the majority up until the beginning of the 18th century. In 1562 Englishman Anthony Jenkinson described the city in the following terms: "This city is five days' walk on camels from the sea, now it has fallen a lot; it is predominantly populated by Armenians..." Adam Olearius, who visited Shamakhi in 1637, wrote: "Its inhabitants are in part Armenians and Georgians, who have their particular language; they would not understand each other if they did not use Turkish, which is common to all and very familiar, not only in Shirvan, but also everywhere in Persia". In the mid-1700s, the population of Shamakhi was about 60,000, most of whom were Armenians.

The British Penny Cyclopaedia stated in 1833 that "The bulk of the population of Shirvan consists of the Tahtar, or, to speak more correctly, Turkish race, with some admixture of Arabs and Persians. . . . Besides the Mohammedans, who form the mass of the population, there are many Armenians, some Jews, and a few Gipsies. According to the official returns of 1831, the number of males belonging to the Mohammedan population was 62,934; Armenians, 6,375; Jews, 332; total males 69,641. The Encyclopædia Britannica stated that in 1873 the city had 25,087 inhabitants, "of which 18,680 were Tartars and Shachsevans, 5,177 were Armenians, and 1,230 Russians".

In 1918, there were 15 villages with a homogeneous Armenian population in the area surrounding Shamakhi: Matrasa, Meisari, Qarqanj, Qalakhan, Arpavut, Khanishen, Dara-Qarqanj, Mirishen, Zarkhu, Saghian, Pakhraqush, Giurjilar, Ghajar, Tvarishen and Balishen.

Silk production was the main output of Shamakhi and a significant part of the cultural heritage of Armenians with 130 silk-winding establishments, owned mostly by Armenians, although the industry considerably declined since 1864.

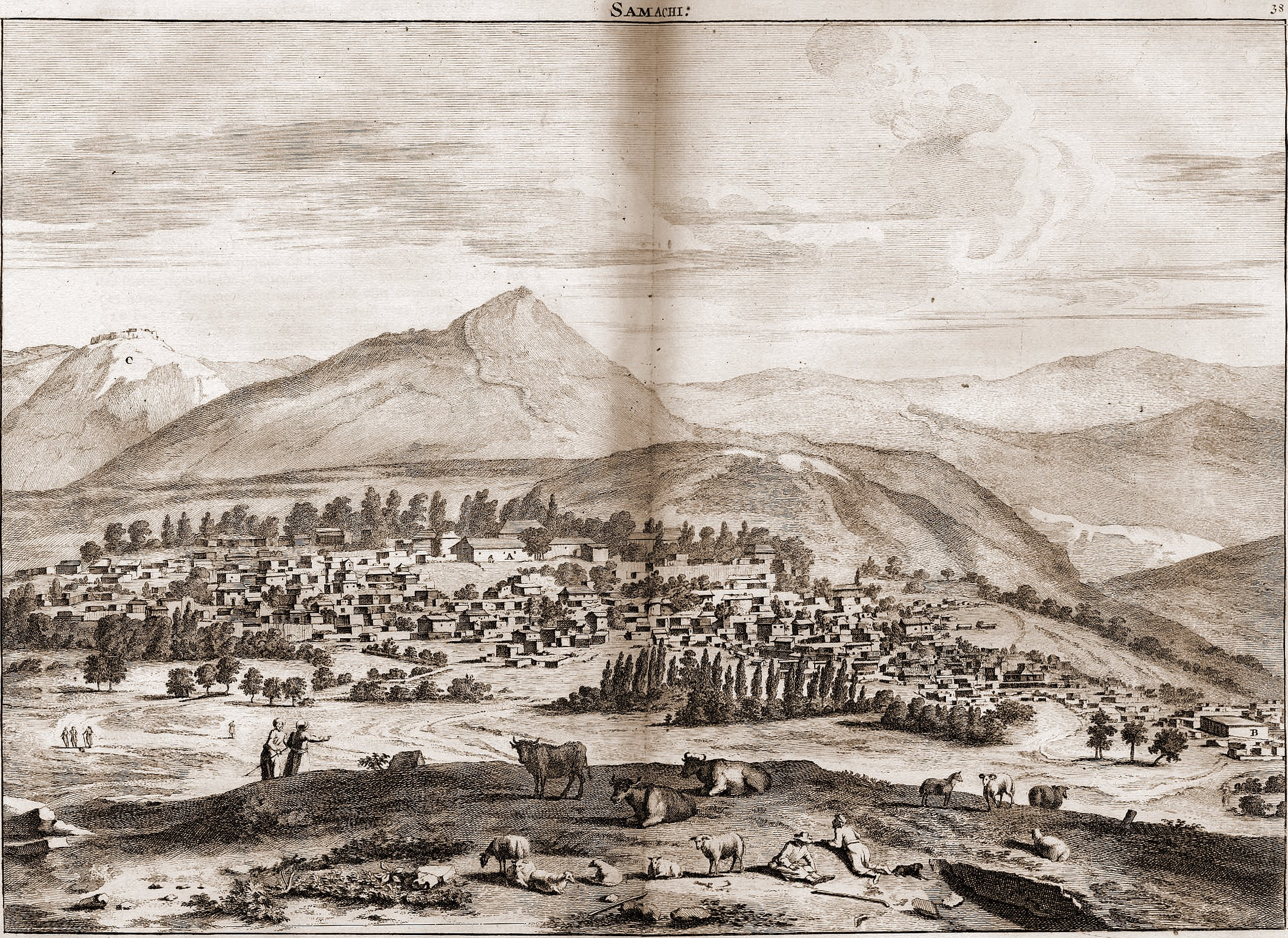
A 19th century Shamakhi landscape

According to the Brockhaus and Efron Encyclopedic Dictionary (vol. 77, p. 460, published in 1903), Shamakhi had 20,008 inhabitants (10,450 males and 9,558 females), of which 79% of the population was Muslim, of which 22% was Sunni and the rest Shiite; the remaining 21% was "Armeno-Gregorian" (members of the Armenian Apostolic Church) and "Pravoslav" (Orthodox). Shamakhi also had a significant Armenian protestant community that was often in conflict with the Armenian Apostolic Church.

The Shamakhi dialect of Armenian, similar to the Karabakh dialect, was a significant part of the cultural heritage of Shamakhi Armenians. It was well preserved when Armenians lived in Shamakhi due to their minority status but fell out of use following the forced relocation of Armenians in 1988.

=== Areas surrounding Nagorno-Karabakh ===
Armenians had a historic presence in Nagorno-Karabakh and the surrounding region. This presence was not restricted to the Nagorno-Karabakh Autonomous Oblast but to areas surrounding it in the regions of Kalbajar, Dashkasan, Lachin, Qubadli and others.

In the Dashkasan district's 4th century Monastery of Saint Translators, Mesrop Mashtots and Sahak Partev translated the Bible from Syriac in 411. Damage to the monastery by Azerbaijan has been reported.

The 9th century Dadivank monastery in Kalbajar District is one of the most famous examples of Armenian Architecture. As Armenian forces withdrew from the district after the Second Nagorno-Karabakh War, concerns have been raised about the fate of the monastery from destruction as Azerbaijani forces take control of the district.

== Armenian cultural heritage in Julfa ==
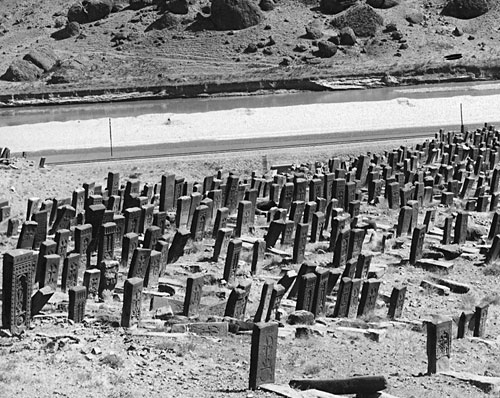
A photograph taken in 1915 by Aram Vruyr showing part of the medieval Armenian cemetery of Julfa.

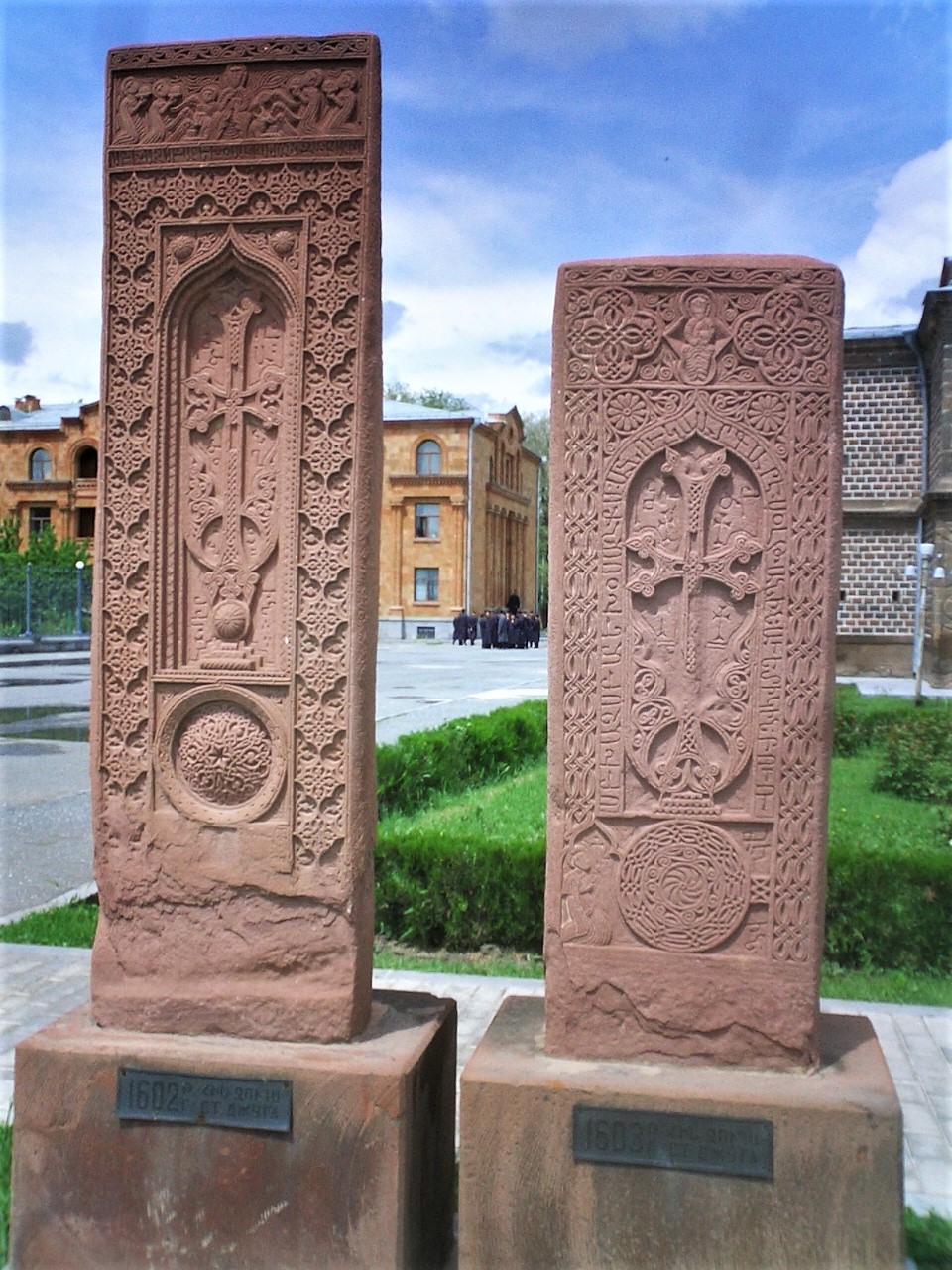
Two 16th century khachkars in Etchmiadzin, removed from the Julfa graveyard before its destruction by Azerbaijan.

Julfa, the administrative capital of the Julfa Rayon, was home to the largest ancient Armenian cemetery in the world, at one time containing 10,000 Khachkars, with the oldest dating back to the 6th century. The site of the cemetery has been a UNESCO World Heritage Site.

Khachkars are traditional steles of red and yellow stones, inscribed in the UNESCO list of Intangible Cultural Heritage, characteristic of Medieval Christian Armenian art bearing a cross and often with additional motifs, rich iconography and symbolism typical to the region in which they are found. A Scottish researcher named Steven Sim, who documented more than 80,000 slides and photographs of ancient Armenian heritage in the area over 35 years, states that the Khachkars of Julfa featured scenes of medieval daily life, such as outdoor activities and food, and mythical creatures specific to the region. During the 17th century, many Armenian merchants from Julfa founded the first cafes in Europe.

By 1920 right before the formation of the USSR less than 3,000 Khachkars remained in Julfa, after decades of destruction by its non-Armenian inhabitants. After the First Nagorno-Karabakh War the number of remaining Khachkars were reduced further. On 15 December 2005, the prelate of the Armenian Church in Northern Iran, Bishop Nshan Topouzian, filmed the destruction of what remained of the Khachkars in Julfa, with Azerbaijani soldiers loading debris into trucks and dumping them into the Araxes river. Footage of the deliberate destruction was released in a short film called The New Tears of Araxes

A journalist from Institute for War and Peace Reporting visiting the site in 2006 reported that no visible traces of the cemetery remained. After studying and comparing satellite photos of Julfa taken in 2003 and 2009, in December 2010 the American Association for the Advancement of Science came to the conclusion that the cemetery was demolished and leveled.

Despite multiple sources of evidence, the Azerbaijani government denies Armenians ever lived in Julfa. The Guardian labeled the recent destruction of the cemetery as part of a "broader campaign to denude Nakhichevan of its indigenous Armenian Christian past". The destruction of the cemetery has been widely described by Armenian sources, and some non-Armenian sources, as an act of "cultural genocide."

Between 1964 and 1987, Nakhchivan-born researcher Argam Aivazian now exiled in Armenia documented 89 Armenian churches, 5,840 Khachkars, and 22,000 tombstones in his native Nakhchivan. A report released in the online arts magazine Hyperallergic stated that all the Armenian heritage documented by Aivazian has been destroyed. Akram Aylisli, an Azerbaijani writer, playwright and former member of parliament, criticized the government of Azerbaijan for the destruction of the Armenian cultural heritage of Nakhchivan, calling it "evil vandalism"

Between 1997 and 2006, a total of 89 churches, 5,840 Khachkars and 22,000 tombstones from the Armenian past of Nakhchivan were destroyed by Azerbaijan in Julfa. The area was never a war zone during the destruction. Many local Azerbaijanis were enraged by the destruction considering the Armenian cemetery part of their cultural history.

== Ancient city of Tigranakert ==
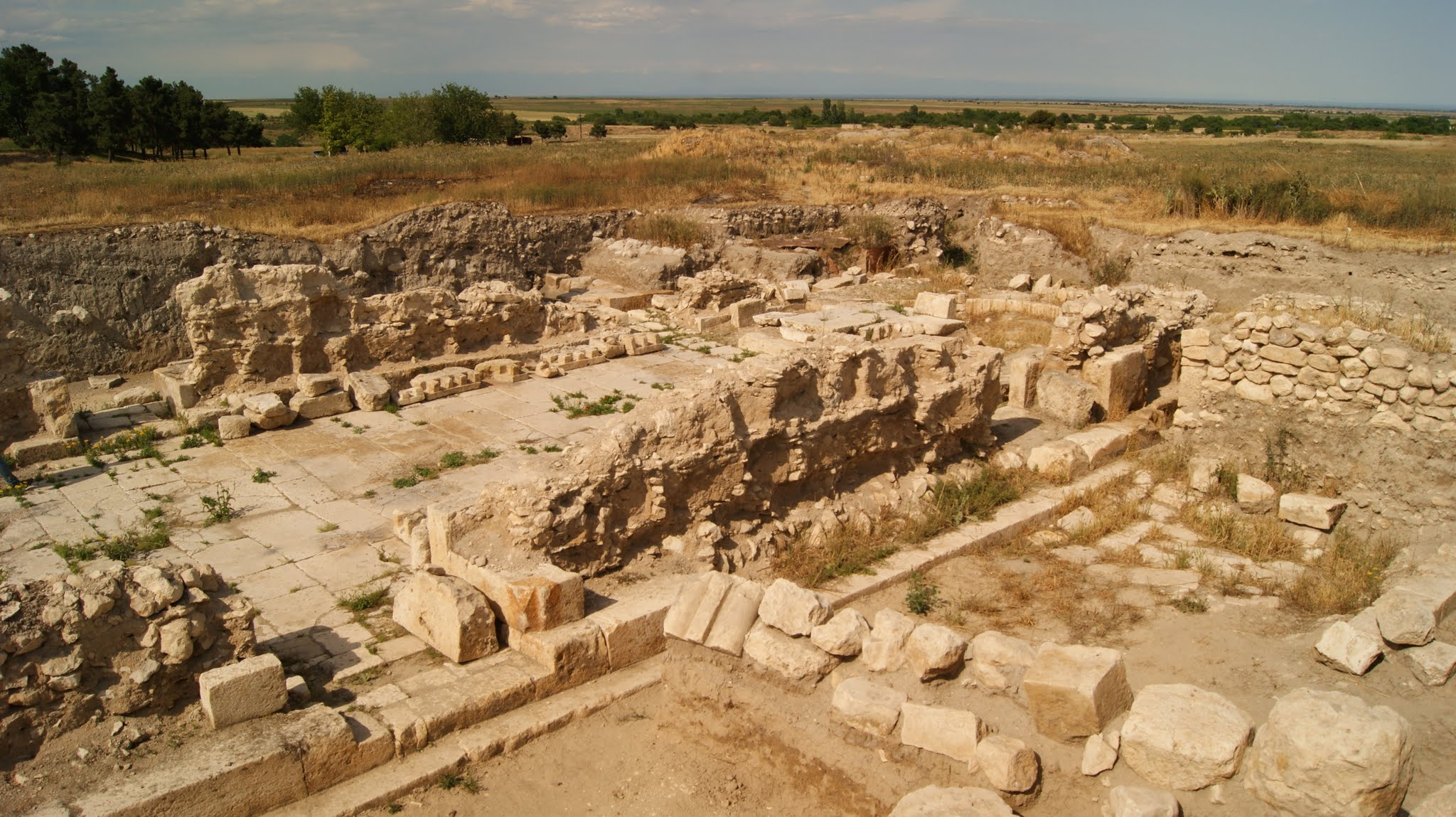
A photograph taken in 2012 showing part of ancient city of Tigranakert.

Tigranakert is a ruined Armenian city dating back to the Hellenistic period, located in the Agdam District of Azerbaijan. It is one of several former cities in the Armenian plateau with the same name, named in honor of the Armenian king Tigranes the Great (r. 95–55 B.C.). The city has both pagan and Christian elements, as it later became a hub of Early Christianity after Armenia's adoption of Christianity in 301 AD. The site has inscriptions in both Armenian and Greek dating back to the 5th and 7th century. The church layout in Tigranakert connects it to ancient Jerusalem, while its cave sanctuaries connect it to Ancient Greece
The city occupies an area of about 70 hectares and is located approximately four kilometers south of the Khachinchay River in Azerbaijan. It reportedly came under shelling by Azerbaijan during the Second Nagorno-Karabakh War with significant damage being reported to the site

== Later developments ==
Starting in the 1950s, there were increased efforts by Soviet Azerbaijan to establish historical links between its Turkic Azeri inhabitants and the region, which have been deemed revisionist. They claimed that modern day Azerbaijanis were descendants of the Caucasian Albanians whereas Armenians came to the region from Anatolia and misappropriated the Caucasian Albanian culture as their own. Many historians deem these theories unhistoric and claim that the Caucasian Albanians interacted and eventually integrated within the Armenian population. These efforts were also linked to Anti-Armenianism and Armenophobia in Azerbaijan. Many ancient Caucasian Albanian churches built on the territory of Azerbaijan once carried Armenian inscriptions and symbols before being destroyed by Azerbaijan in its efforts to erase the Armenian link to Caucasian Albanians., From the 1950s to the present, many of the Armenian monuments that exist in Azerbaijan have been intentionally modified in order to hide their Armenian pedigree and Albanise them, such as having their Armenian inscriptions removed.

The history of Armenians and Albanians are closely linked as the Armenian linguist and theological Mesrop Mashtots who is credited for creating the Armenian Alphabet had also created the Caucasian Albanian. In 1996 discoveries of Albanian manuscripts confirmed the link to the Armenian language, and many features of the architecture of remaining Albanian churches have close resemblance to Armenian ecclesiastical architecture.

During and after the Second Nagorno-Karabakh War, and in relation to the ceasefire agreement signed after the war where Armenians handed over territories back to Azerbaijan, many Armenians and foreign historians raised concerns about the fate of Armenian cultural heritage in Azerbaijan citing many previous instances of Armenian monuments being destroyed by Azerbaijan to erase the Armenian presence in the country, which was deemed by many an act of cultural genocide. Concerns were raised that in its attempt to erase the Armenian history in the recaptured territories, Azerbaijan will remove the inscriptions and Armenian symbols from the churches, in line with its revisionist Caucasian Albanian historical narrative.

On December 4, a petition signed more than 160 scholars from 23 countries including Armenia and Georgia was delivered to the Secretariat of State of the Holy See with an urgent appeal to defend the Armenian monuments in the territory captured by Azerbaijan.

== Religious buildings ==
=== Overview ===
Armenians had a long historic presence in the territory of present day Azerbaijan where they build churches, monasteries and cemeteries.

=== Selected list of churches, monasteries and cemeteries ===
No.	Image	Name	Date founded	Present structure built	Location
1		St. John the Baptist Church (Armenian: Սուրբ Հովհաննես Մկրտիչ եկեղեցի)	13th century	1881	Martakert, Tartar
2		Dadivank (Armenian: Դադիվանք)	1st century	Between 9th and 13th century	Kalbajar District
2		Gandzasar (Armenian: Գանձասար)	11th century	1238	Kalbajar District
3		Katarovank (Armenian: Կատարովանք)	4th century	17th century	Khojavend District
3		Tsitsernavank Monastery (Armenian: Ծիծեռնավանք)	5th century	10th century	Lachin District
4		Gtichavank (Armenian: Գտչավանք)	4th century	13th century	Khojavend District
4		Amaras (Armenian: Ամարաս)	4th century	1858	Khojavend District
5		Yeghishe Arakyal Monastery (Armenian: Եղիշէ Առաքեալի վանք)	5th century	13th century	Tartar District
6		Vankasar Church (Armenian: Վանքասարի եկեղեցի)	7th century	Unknown	Agdam District
7		Ghazanchetsots Cathedral (Armenian: Ղազանչեցոց)	1868	1887	Shusha District
8		Monastery of Saint Translators (Armenian: Սուրբ Թարգմանչաց վանք)	5th century	19th century	Dashkasan District

== See also ==
- Culture of Armenia
- Culture of Artsakh
- Armenian Architecture
- Armenian Apostolic Church
- Armenians in Azerbaijan
- List of Azerbaijani Armenians
- List of Armenian churches in Azerbaijan
