= Armenian Church, Baku =

Church building in Baku, Azerbaijan

Saint Gregory the Illuminator Cathedral
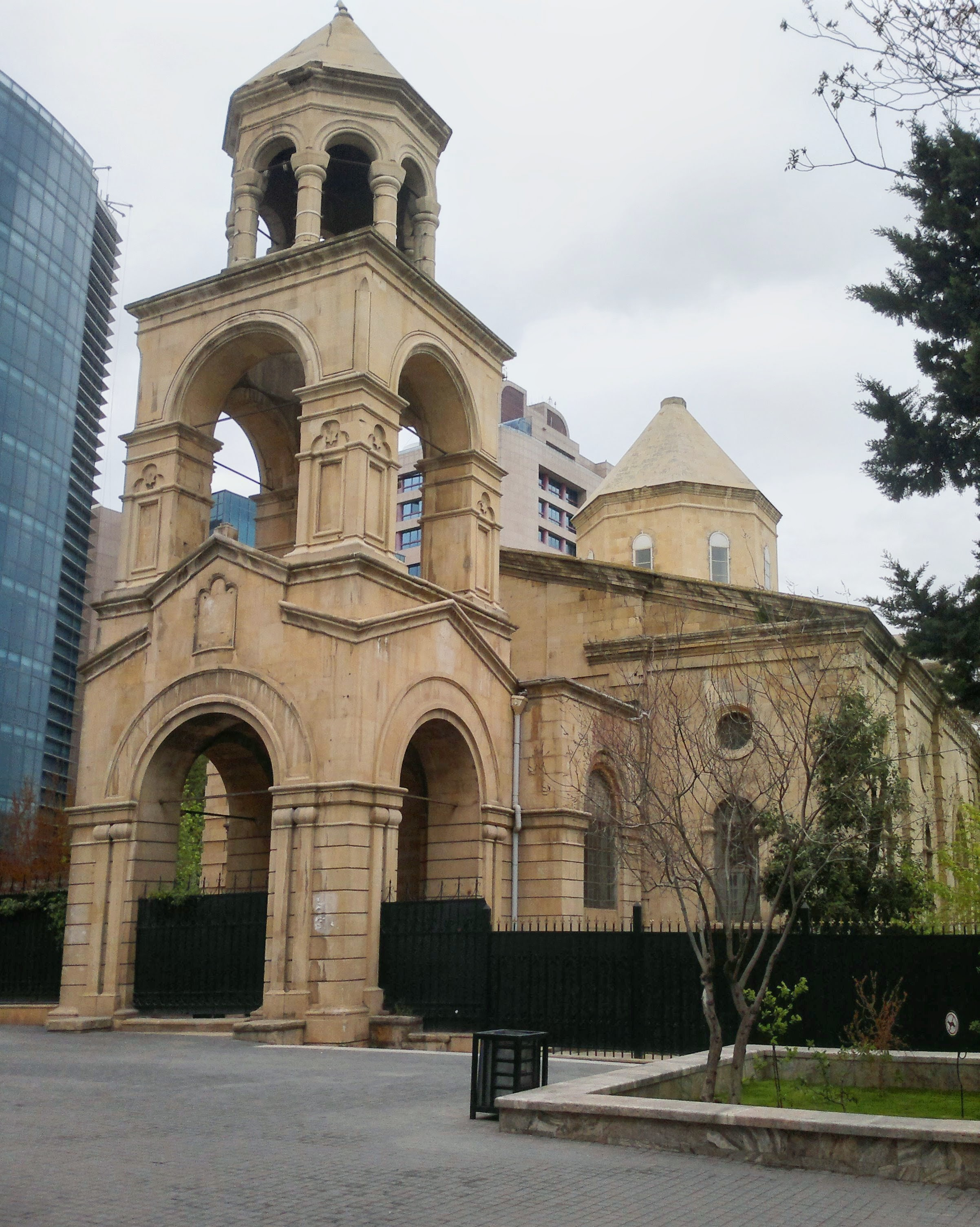
- The church in April 2013

Religion
- Affiliation: Armenian Apostolic Church
- Ecclesiastical or organisational status: Not functioning, book depository (library)
- Year consecrated: May 4, 1869

Location
- Location: 38 Nizami Street, Baku, Azerbaijan
- Interactive map of Saint Gregory the Illuminator Cathedral
- Coordinates: 40.371623°N 49.836466°E

Architecture
- Architect: Karl Gustav Hippius
- Style: Armenian architecture
- Groundbreaking: 1863
- Completed: 1869

Saint Gregory the Illuminator Church, (Note: Armenian: Բաքվի Սուրբ Գրիգոր Լուսավորիչ եկեղեցի, Bak’vi Surb Grigor Lusavorich yekeghetsi; Azerbaijani: Müqəddəs Maarifləndirici Qriqori Kilsəsi) commonly referred to as the Armenian Church of Baku, (Note: Armenian: Բաքվի հայկական եկեղեցի, Bak’vi haykakan yekeghetsi; Azerbaijani: Bakı erməni kilsəsi) is a former Armenian Apostolic church near Fountains Square in central Baku, Azerbaijan. Completed in 1869, it was one of the two Armenian churches in Baku to survive the Soviet anti-religious campaign and the Nagorno-Karabakh conflict and the 1990 pogrom and exodus of Baku Armenians when it was looted. It is now the only standing Armenian monument in Baku.

== Early history ==
The church was built between 1863 and 1869 by the design of Karl Hippius, a Baltic German architect. The cornerstone was consecrated by vardapet Daniel Shahnazariants, the bishop of the diocese of Shamakhi, in June 1863. The construction was funded by Javad Melikiants (Melikov), a Baku-based Armenian philanthropist and founder of the city's first paraffin plant. The church was consecrated on May 4, 1869, by archbishop Andreas Andreasian. The Armenian Philanthropic Society of Baku founded a girls' school in 1866 and a library in 1870 next to the church.

In 1903 the Russian government's decision to confiscate the properties of the Armenian church were widely opposed by Armenians. The church was the site of a clash between Russian Cossack soldiers and Armenian nationalist activists on September 2, 1903. A group of armed activists affiliated with the Armenian Revolutionary Federation (Dashnaks), led by Nikol Duman defended the church. The confrontation turned violent by night and resulted in 11 deaths and 45 injuries on the Armenian side.

On September 15, 1918, the church was attacked and looted by the invading Ottoman forces in the aftermath of the Battle of Baku. On June 11, 1919, Ottoman-Azerbaijani forces sieged the church and conducted a search. After not finding any arms inside, the soldiers shot at the walls of the church.

In 1920, it became the cathedral of the Armenian Apostolic Diocese of Azerbaijan and Turkmenistan. It survived through the Soviet state atheist policies of the 1920s and 1930s, when all but two Armenian churches in Baku were destroyed. The church was reopened in 1945 and became the seat of the diocese of Azerbaijan. In the 1950s, the church underwest restoration and by 1956 five priests and ministers served at the cathedral. It had a choir, which was composed of 25 people in 1970, when they visited Etchmiadzin.

== 1990 pogrom and aftermath ==
The large Armenian population of Baku, over 200,000 people, began fleeing their homes following the Sumgait pogrom in February 1988 during the Nagorno-Karabakh conflict. The Armenian bishop of Baku, Anania Arapadjyan, left in late 1988 as Soviet authorities told him they could no longer guarantee his safety there. By May 1989, Vartan Diluyan at the church was the last remaining Armenian priest in Azerbaijan. He told the American writer Jim Forest that until the recent tensions, "the climate was very favorable" with a visitor having "found a crowded church with a good choir." By that time mainly old Armenians had stayed in Baku. Baku's remaining Armenians were targeted in a January 1990 pogrom.

Two weeks prior to the pogrom, serious damage to the church was caused by an arson attack on December 25, 1989, but it remained standing. Catholicos Vazgen I, head of the Armenian Church, wrote to Yuri Khristoradnov, the chairman of the Soviet Council for Religious Affairs, that "extremist Azeri nationalists" set fire to the church, which destroyed "valuable ecclesiastical books, holy paintings, and all ecclesiastical clothing." Azerbaijani Muslim leader Allahshukur Pashazade later claimed that he had criticized the destruction of the cathedral, but was not successful in stopping it as he was in Moscow at the time. Bill Keller described the church February 1990 as a "charred ruin." He quoted a local resident as saying that "firefighters and the police watched without intervening as vandals destroyed the building." Likewise Peter Hopkirk found the church "burned-out" when he visited in spring 1991. Human Rights Watch noted in 1995 that "Armenians have vanished from the streets of Baku" and the "Armenian church in Baku stand[s] empty."

=== Current state ===
In August 2001, the cabinet of Azerbaijan listed the church as a historical and cultural monument of national importance.

In his 2003 book Black Garden, Thomas de Waal wrote the church "remains a gutted shell", its "cross has been removed from the belfry" and that it was "used as a pool [billiard] hall." He noted that it remains the only visible Armenian monument in Baku. Jason Thomson wrote in 2005 that it was "transformed into a billiard hall and tea house." According to Azerbaijani sources, its library, consisting of 5,000 books and manuscripts, has been preserved.

In 2002, the church was transferred to the Presidential Library, which is located nearby, and now houses its archive. In 2006 Azerbaijani Minister of Culture Abulfas Garayev stated that converting the church into a library is purposeful because there are not many Armenian Christians in Azerbaijan. Emil Sanamyan, fellow at the USC Institute of Armenian Studies, argued that it is a depository and not a library, as there is no public access. According to Samir Huseynov, it is open to PhD students and other researchers upon request.

Despite the aggressive state-sponsored anti-Armenian sentiment in Azerbaijan, the Azerbaijani authorities have presented the church as proof of their tolerance of minorities, especially the Armenians. In a 2021 interview, Azerbaijani president Ilham Aliyev claimed the church was repaired. "It is in the center of the city, and if anyone goes there, they will see that there are about 5,000 Armenian books there," he told CNN Türk.

=== Visits by Armenians ===
In April 2010 Catholicos Karekin II, the head of the Armenian Apostolic Church, visited the church and prayed and sang medieval hymns there. He expressed hope that the church will eventually "reopen its doors to believers." It was the first time since 1990 that prayer was heard at the church.

In April 2012 the Armenian delegation participating at a Euronest Parliamentary Assembly meeting in Baku visited the church. In their visit in September 2017 the Armenian delegates found the church and its grounds closed.

== Gallery ==
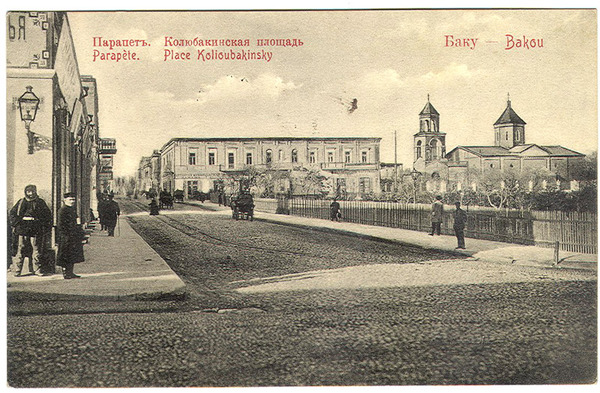
A Tsarist (pre-1917) period photo of Kolyubakinskaya Square ("Parapet")

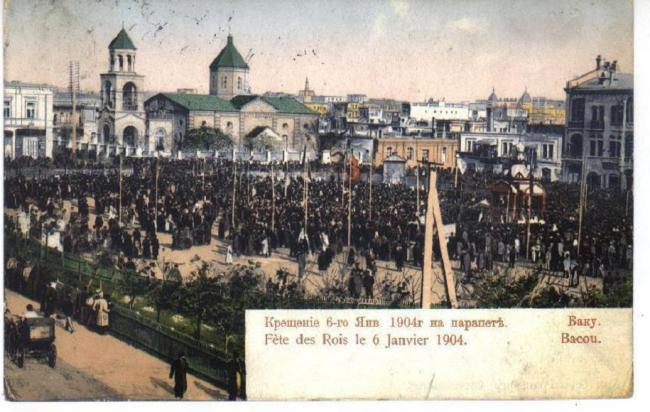
Theophany (Epiphany) Feast procession on January 6, 1904, on Kolyubakinskaya Sq. The church is in the background.

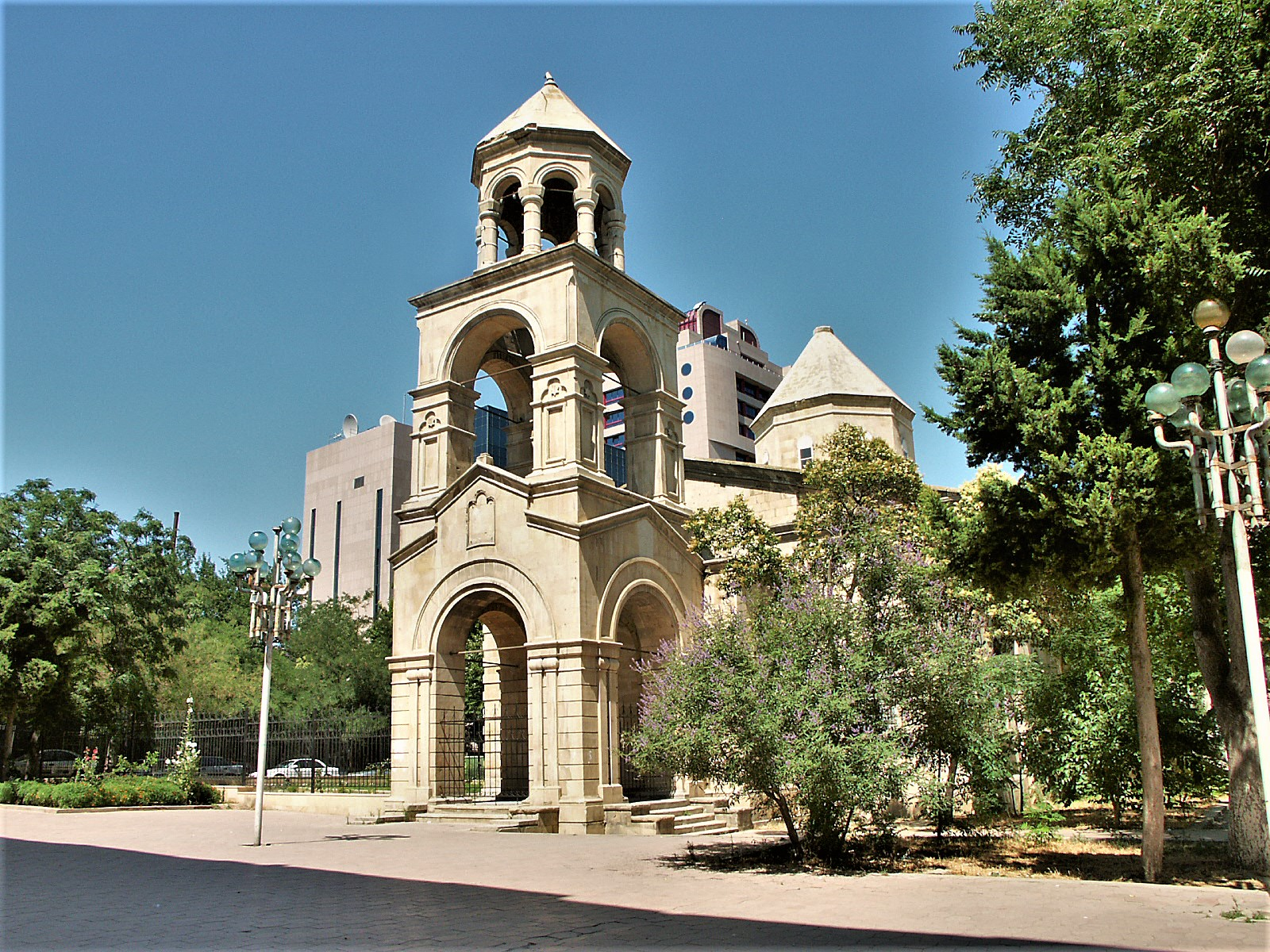
The church in 2004

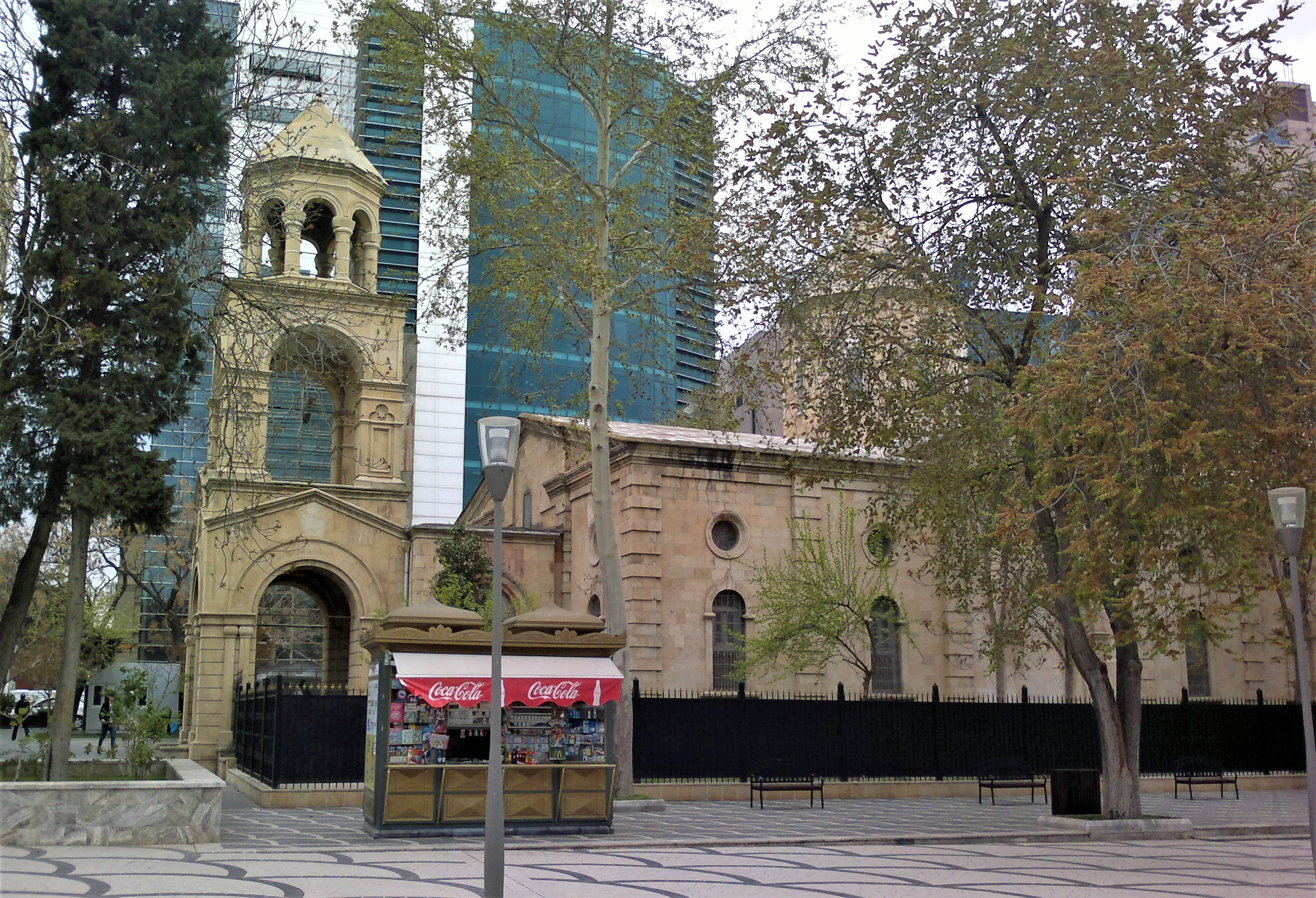
The church in 2013

== See also ==
- Church of the Holy Virgin, a small Armenian church in Baku's Old City. Built in the 1700s and destroyed in 1992.
- Saint Thaddeus and Bartholomew Cathedral, destroyed in the 1930s

== Bibliography ==
- de Waal, Thomas (2003). Black Garden: Armenia and Azerbaijan Through Peace and War. New York: New York University Press. ISBN 978-0-8147-1945-9.
- Stepanyan, G. S. (2009). "Համառոտ ակնարկ Բաքվի Սբ. Գրիգոր Լուսավորիչ եկեղեցու պատմության [A Brief Review of the History of St.Gregory the Illuminator Church in Baku]". Lraber Hasarakakan Gitutyunneri (in Armenian) (3): 45–59. Archived from the original on 6 January 2015.
