= Alexander Mirzoyan =

Soviet footballer (born 1951)

Personal information
- Full name: Alexander Bagratovich Mirzoyan
- Date of birth: 20 April 1951 (age 75)
- Place of birth: Baku, Soviet Union
- Height: 1.78 m (5 ft 10 in)
- Position: Defender

Senior career*
| Years | Team | Apps | (Gls) |
| 1969–1974 | Neftchi Baku PFC | 114 | (1) |
| 1975–1978 | FC Ararat Yerevan | 85 | (6) |
| 1979–1982 | FC Spartak Moscow | 80 | (9) |

International career
| 1979–1980 | USSR | 2 | (0) |

Managerial career
- 1986: FC Spartak Kostroma
- 1987: Lokomotiv Gorky
- * Club domestic league appearances and goals

Alexander Bagratovich Mirzoyan (Armenian: Ալեքսանդր Բագրատի Միրզոյան; Russian: Александр Багратович Мирзоян) (born 20 April 1951) is a retired Soviet football player and coach of Armenian descent. Beginning in 1994, he has been the president of the Russian Football Veterans Union.

== Honours ==
- Soviet Top League winner: 1979.
- Soviet Cup winner: 1975.

== International career ==
Mirzoyan made his debut for USSR on 21 November 1979, in a friendly against West Germany. He played in one 1982 FIFA World Cup qualifier.

== See also ==
- Armenians in Baku
