= Church of the Holy Virgin (Baku) =

Armenian Apostolic church in Azerbaijan

Coordinates: 40°21′57″N 49°50′13″E

Holy Mother of God Church in Baku
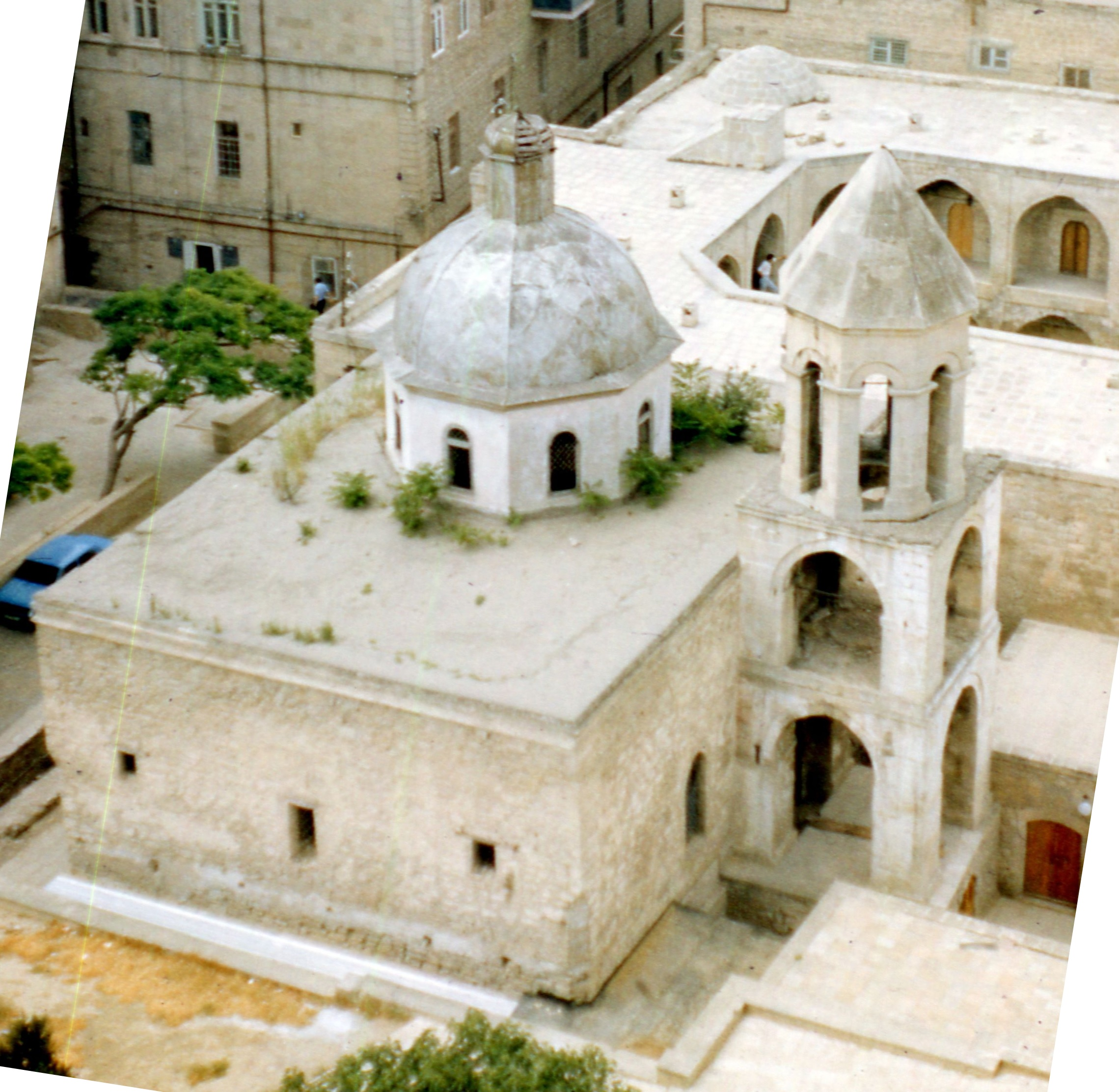
- Holy Mother of God Church in Baku, 1987

Religion
- Affiliation: Armenian Apostolic Church
- Status: destroyed in 1992

Location
- Location: Baku, Azerbaijan
- Interactive map of Holy Mother of God Church in Baku

Architecture
- Type: Hall church
- Style: Armenian
- Completed: 18th century

Church of the Holy Virgin or Holy Mother of God Church (Armenian: Սուրբ Աստվածածին եկեղեցի, Russian: Церковь Святой Богоматери, церковь Аствацацин, Azerbaijani: Surp Astvatsatsin Erməni Kilsəsi) was an Armenian Apostolic church in the Old City (İçərişəhər) of Baku, Azerbaijan, built in the 18th century and demolished in 1992. It was on the southern side of the Maiden Tower at the turn off Neftchilar (Neftyanikov) Avenue between the caravanserai (today Mugam Club Baku, until 1996 Music Museum), Barbara Street (now Hagigat Rzayeva Street, Həqiqət Rzayeva küçəsi) and Great Minaret Street (now Asaf Zeynally Street, Asəf Zeynallı küçəsi).

Since there were not many Armenians in the Old City compared to the rest of Baku, the church did not have a large parish. Therefore and because it has been erased from public memory in Baku, little information has remained about it, and some statements about it are contradictory. According to Leonid Bretanitsky, the church was built near an Armenian caravansary beneath the Maiden Tower. Benjamin Arustamyan states that perhaps already Hamdallah Mustawfi Qazwini (ca. 1281–1344) mentioned an Armenian church and that the Armenian church of Holy Mother of God (Surp Astvatsatsin) was built in 1799 (i.e. under Persian rule of the Qajars) beneath the Maiden Tower inside Baku fortress, and demolished in the 1930s. However, the church stood until the Nagorno-Karabakh conflict, as can also be seen on several photographs. It was the Armenian Saint Thaddeus and Bartholomew Cathedral in Baku that was really destroyed under Joseph Stalin.

At the end of the 19th century, the Armenian priest Markar Barkhudaryants noted that the Armenians of Baku had two stone churches: a large one named after Saint Gregory the Illuminator and a smaller one named Surb Astvatsatsin (Holy Mother of God). He characterized Surb Astvatsatsin as old, as evidenced by the internal and external forms of architectural construction.

Thomas de Waal mentions that according to the diplomat who worked in Baku in 1992, at the height of the Karabakh conflict, the church was destroyed, and now instead there is a space at its former site near the Maiden Tower.

== See also ==
- Saint Gregory the Illuminator Church, the only remaining Armenian church in Baku
