= Vankasar Church =

Church in the Aghdam District of Azerbaijan

- Վանքասար Վանք; Beşikdağ kilsəsi
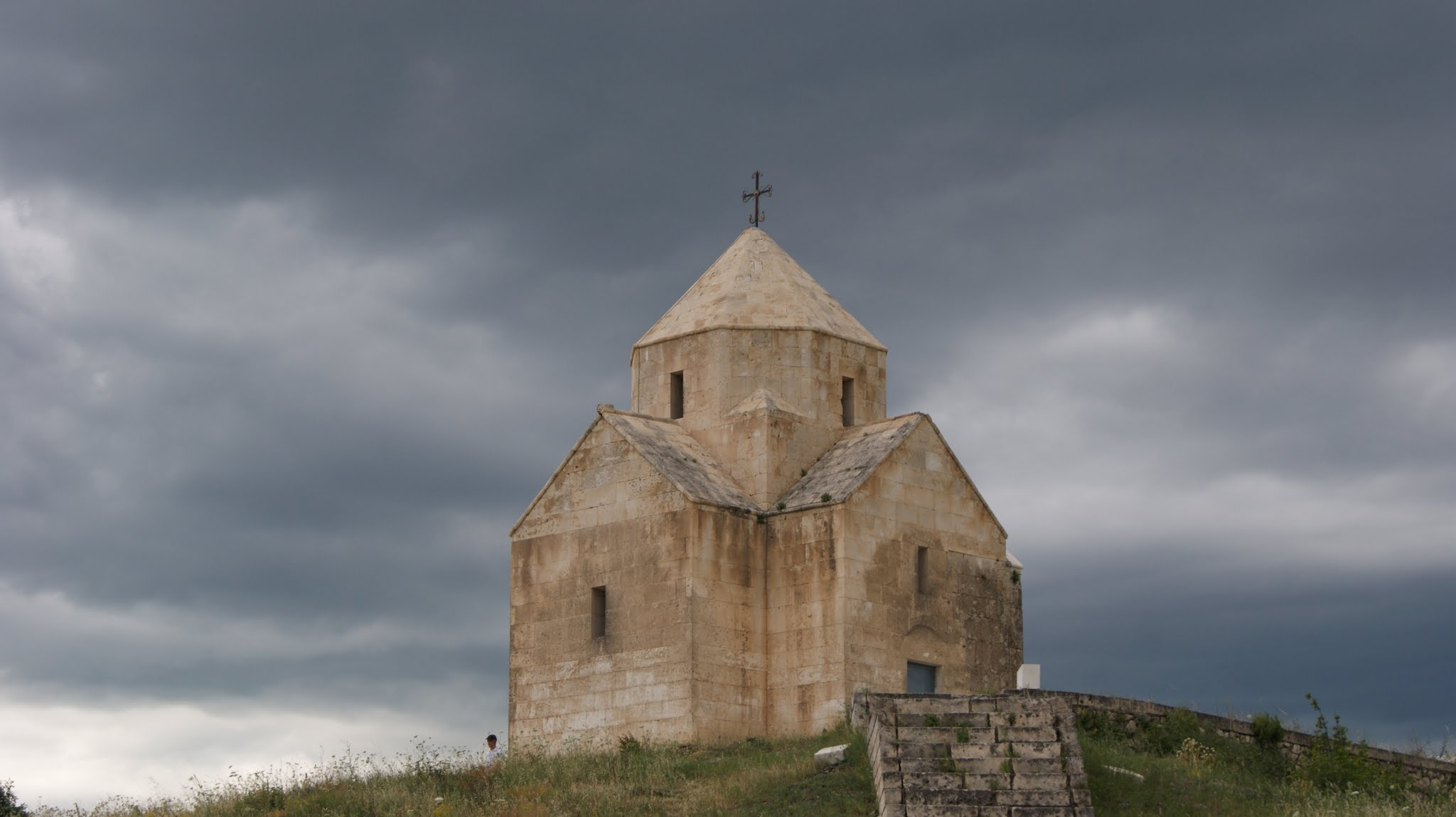
- Church of Vankasar

- Location within Azerbaijan

Religion
- Affiliation: Armenian Apostolic Church

Location
- Location: Agdam District, Azerbaijan
- Coordinates: 40.0721°N 46.8874°E

Architecture
- Style: Armenian
- Completed: 7th century

Vankasar Church (Armenian: Վանքասարի եկեղեցի, Azerbaijani: Beşikdağ kilsəsi) is a 7th-century Armenian church located in the Agdam District, Azerbaijan.

== History ==
Vankasar Church was built sometime in the 7th century, but the first known records of its existence are from 1858, when it was described as "ruins of a monastery" by Archbishop Sargis Jalalyants. In the 1980s, it underwent restoration by the Azerbaijani government, during which Armenian inscriptions and carvings were destroyed, and khachkars moved or damaged. During the First Nagorno-Karabakh War, the church was damaged by a projectile, but it was later repaired by the Artsakh Department of Tourism. In 2021, after the Second Nagorno-Karabakh War and the Azerbaijani recapture of the area, concerns were raised by Caucasus Heritage Watch about satellite images taken of the church. The images, showing multiple vehicles parked near the site, were viewed as possible indicators of Azerbaijani interference with the church. At the end of January 2024, a video was posted on Instagram, where the early medieval church on the top of Mount Vankasar was filmed. The video reveals that the cross atop the dome of the church has been removed.

== Architecture ==
Vankasar Church is an early Medieval cruciform-style church with a central conical dome. It is built of cream colored stone, and it sits on a peak that allows it to be visible from several miles away.

== See also ==
- Armenian architecture
