= Ernest Arushanov =

Soviet/Moldovan experimental physicist (born 1941)

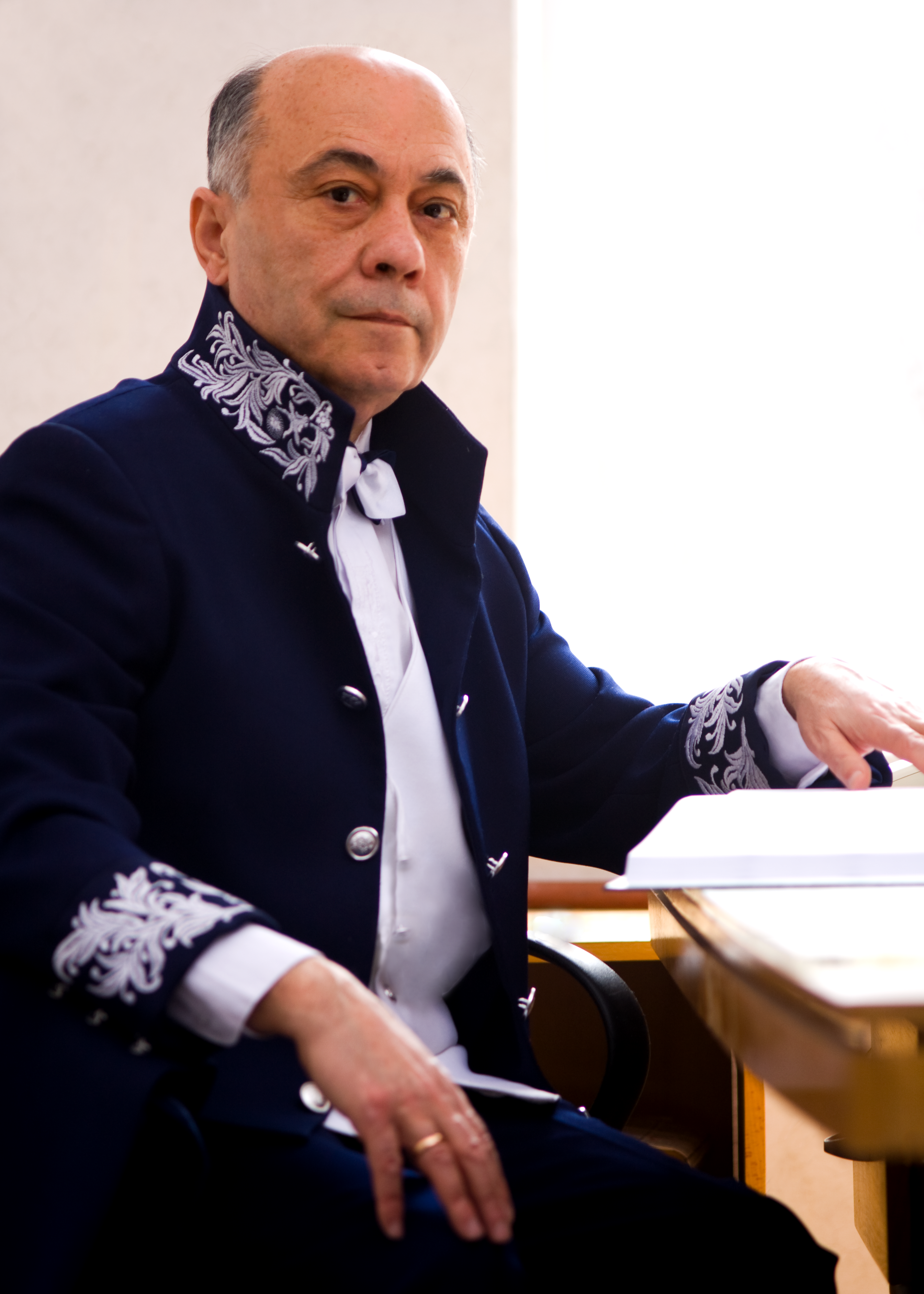
- Born: 4 February 1941 (age 85); Baku, Azerbaijan
- Citizenship: Moldova
- Education: Kishinev State University
- Occupations: Academician, professor
- Known for: New methods of the growth, analysis and the practical application of semiconductors A^{2}_{3}B^{5}_{2} and A^{2}B^{5} based on cadmium.
- Scientific career
- Fields: Semiconductor compounds physics
- Workplaces: Institute of Applied Physics, Academy of Sciences of Moldova
- Doctoral advisor: Ivan Andronik

Ernest Arushanov (Эрнест Константинович Арушанов; born February 4, 1941) is a Soviet and Moldovan experimental physicist, academician of the Academy of Sciences of Moldova.

== Biography ==
Arushanov was born and raised in Baku, where he graduated from high school in 1958. Immediately after graduating from high school arrived in Chișinău, where he entered Kishinev State University (Moldova State University now), Physics and Mathematics department. In 1963 after successful graduation from the university he entered the post-graduate department of the same university, resulted in the PhD thesis in the field of semiconductor compounds (1969). In the period from 1967 to 1986, he worked as a researcher at the Institute of Applied Physics, Academy of Sciences of the Moldavian SSR, in the laboratory of Sergei Ivanovich Radautsan. Then in 1984, defended his doctor-habilitat dissertation. From 1986 to 1988 – he was head of the laboratory he created - Laboratory of the narrow-gap materials. In 1988 he was appointed the deputy director of the Institute of Applied Physics. In 1989 Arushanov became professor, and in 1992 he was elected a Corresponding member of the Academy of Sciences of Moldova.

After the collapse of the Soviet Union, Arushanov made a substantial contribution to the preservation of the Institute's capacity, attracting foreign investments for further development of Moldovan science in general and for physics development in particular. In 1997, he resigned as deputy director and became the head of Laboratory of Materials and Structures for Solar Energy Conversion.

In 2000, at a general meeting of the Assembly of the Academy of Sciences of Moldova, Arushanov was elected Academician.

== Teaching experience ==
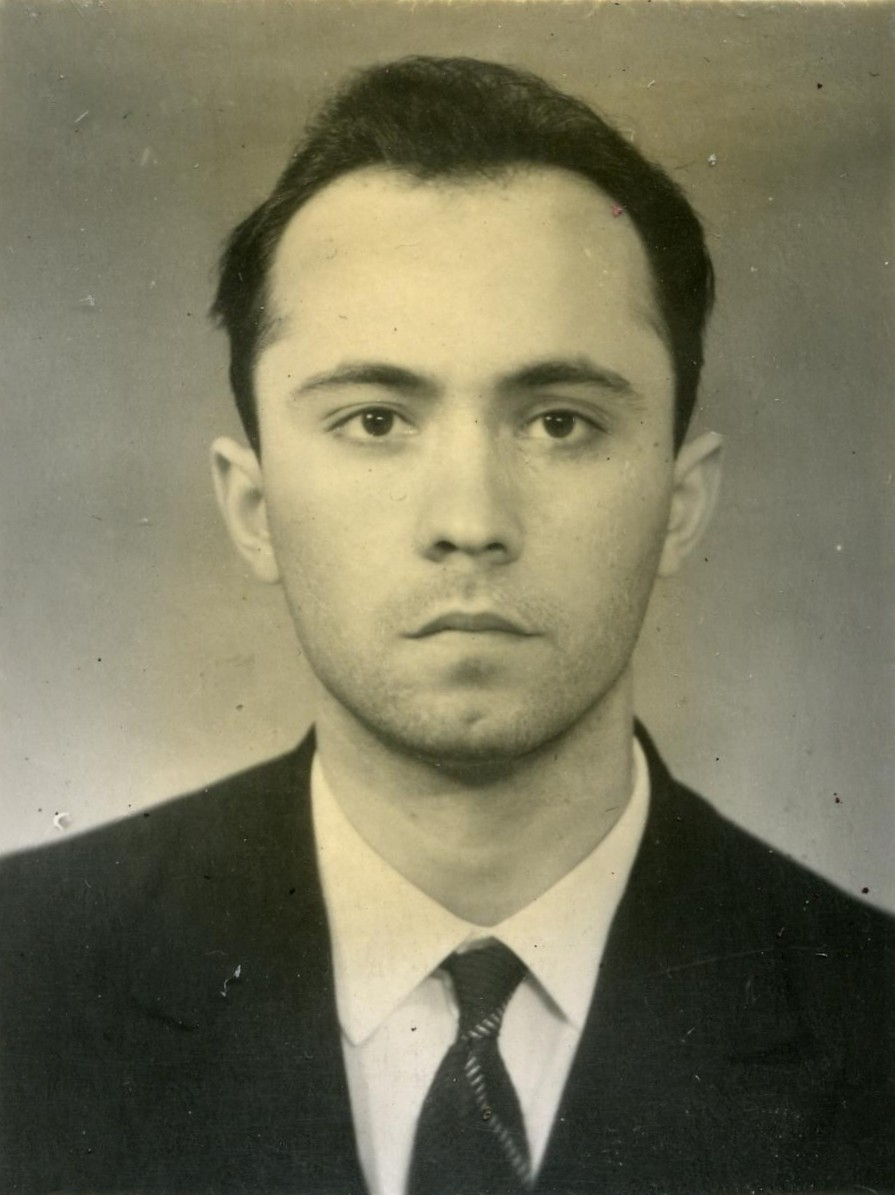
Young Ernest Arushanov.

Teaching experience of E. K. Arushanov has more than 40 years. The first course in semiconductor physics, he lectured at the Kishinev Polytechnic Institute, named after Sergey Lazo in the period from 1970 to 1972. Later in the same place, Arushanov lectured on Materials and Semiconductor Physics (1986–1988).

The collapse of the Soviet Union gave Soviet professors and researchers the opportunity to work in the West; Arushanov took advantage of it. In 1993–1994, he held seminars on physics at the University of Konstanz, Germany. This was followed by an invitation to France, where Arushanov was offered to lecture physics, first in 1995 and 1996 at the Paul Sabatier University in Toulouse, and then in 2002 at the University of Paris. Also Ernest Arushanov in different periods lectured as an invited professor at specialized Institutes and Universities of Austria, England, Holland, Spain, Canada, Poland, Singapore, and Switzerland.

Since 1974, Arushanov prepared 15 PhDs, and continues to pass his knowledge to present graduate students.

== Research ==
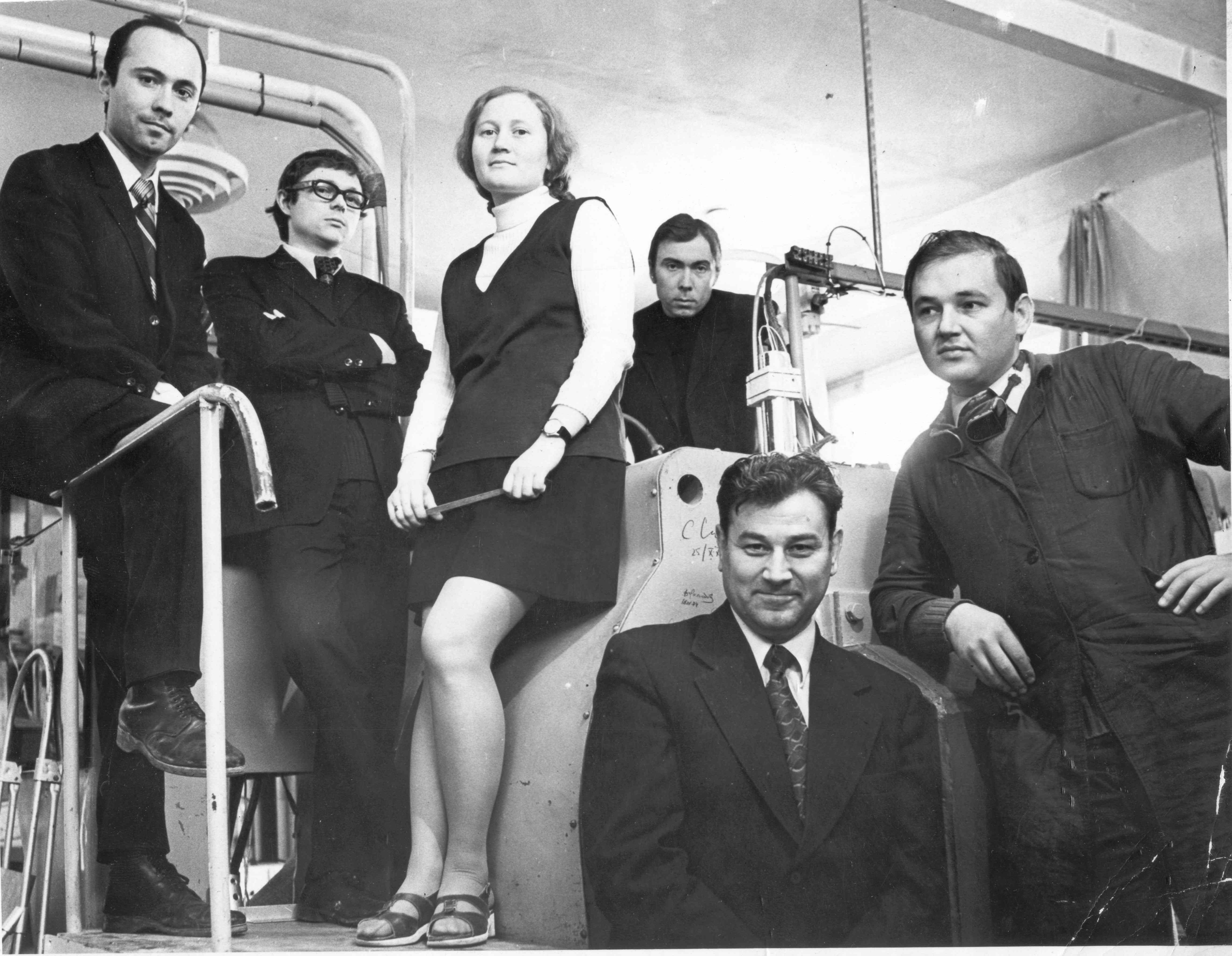
Collaborators of Laboratory of Semiconductor compounds (from left to right: Ernest Arushanov, Vladimir Pruglo, Liudmila Lukianova, Alexandr Nateprov, Serghei Radautsan (head of the laboratory), Dmitrii Samusi).

E. Arushanov's scientific interests are extremely diverse, but still the bases of his works are works on the theory of transport phenomena in various semiconductor compounds. This is evidenced by his dissertations, PhD and doctorate.

PhD thesis of E. Arushanov "Investigation of transport properties in single crystals of cadmium antimonide" was written during the work in the laboratories of the Kishinev State University and the Ioffe Physical Technical Institute (Leningrad). His doctoral advisor was one of the best professors KSU, lecturer and PhD in Physics and Mathematics, Ivan Andronic. One of the official opponents was the future academician of three Academies (New York, Azerbaijan and the International Academy of Ecoenergetics) and well-known scientist in the field of semiconductor physics Maksud Aliev, he also became opponent and for Arushanov's doctoral dissertation ("Transport Phenomena and the band structure of semiconductors A^{2}_{3}B^{5}_{2} and A^{2}B^{5} based on cadmium"). The second opponent on doctoral thesis was the State Prize of the USSR laureate, Doctor of Physical and Mathematical Sciences Professor Anatolii Regel.

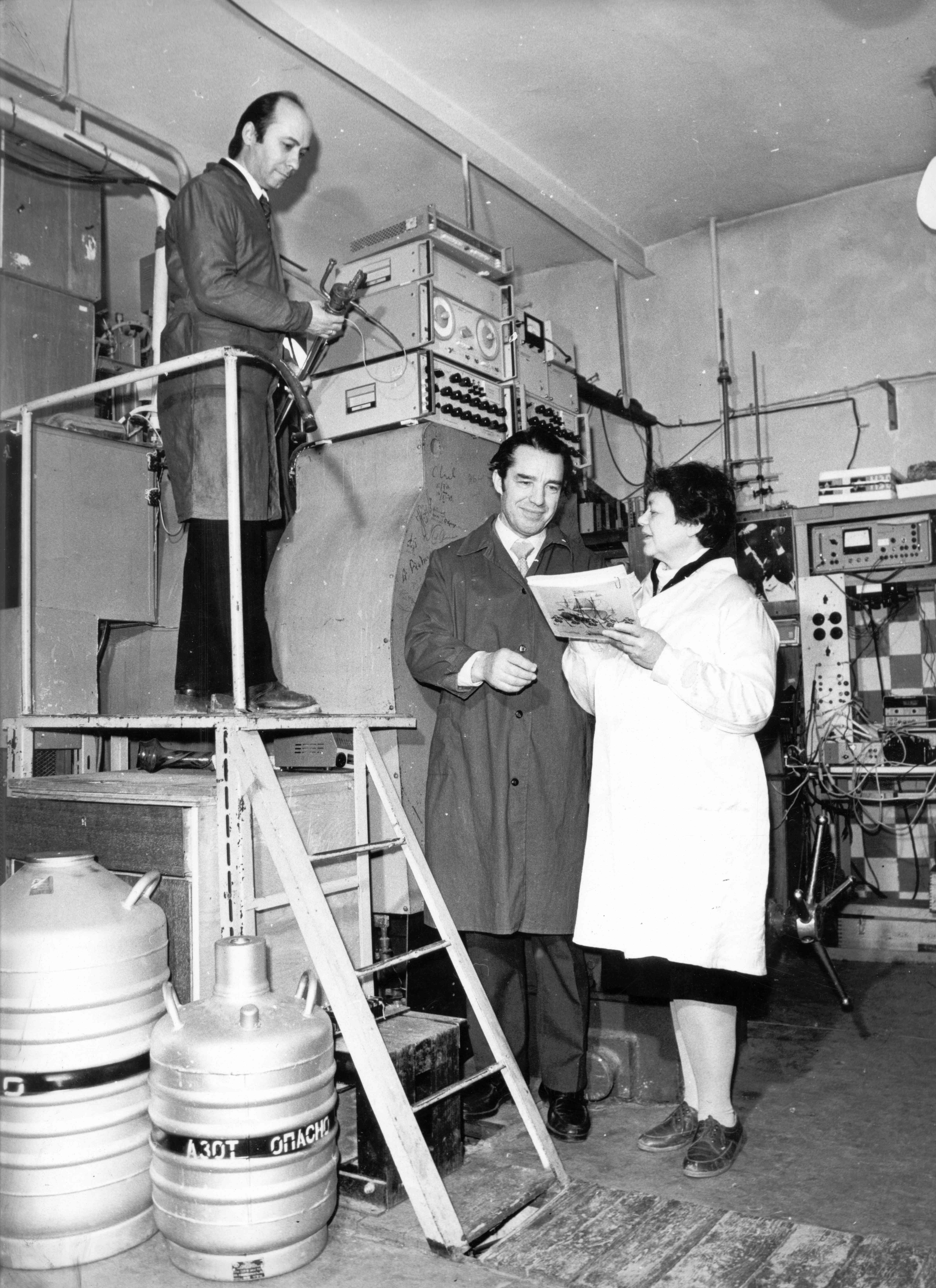
Ernest Arushanov during the work with intense magnetic fields.

Doctoral dissertation of Ernest Arushanov began a new research direction in physics and materials science of semiconductors – the growth of single crystals, determination of the band structure, scattering mechanisms of charge carriers and the practical application of semiconductors A^{2}_{3}B^{5}_{2} and A^{2}B^{5} based on cadmium[4].

During his research EK Arushanov obtained 12 patents, has published three monographs, three reviews and more than 300 scientific articles in various national and international journals, on crystal growth, electrical, optical and magnetic properties of materials for solar energy, thermoelectricity, optoelectronics, spintronics and superconductors.

At the present time, the main scientific interest of Ernest Konstantinovich is finding new absorbing materials for solar cells, which he does in the Laboratory of Materials and Structures for Solar Energy Conversion. However, being a prominent scientist in the field of semiconductor compounds properties investigation, Ernest Arushanov is a frequent guest in the laboratories of various countries (including Germany, Spain, and France), where he is engaged in a variety of studies.

== Awards ==
- State Prize of Moldavian SSR in the Field of Science and Technique for work on Material Science and Physics of Semiconductors (1983).
- State Prize of Republic of Moldova in the Field of Science and Technique for work on Ternary and Multinary compounds (1998).
- In 2001, Ernest Arushanov became «Om Emerit» for achievements in the development of Moldovan science.
