= Armenian Philanthropic Society of Baku =

Philanthropic organization

Armenian Philanthropic Society
- Հայ Մարդասիրական Ընկերութիւն
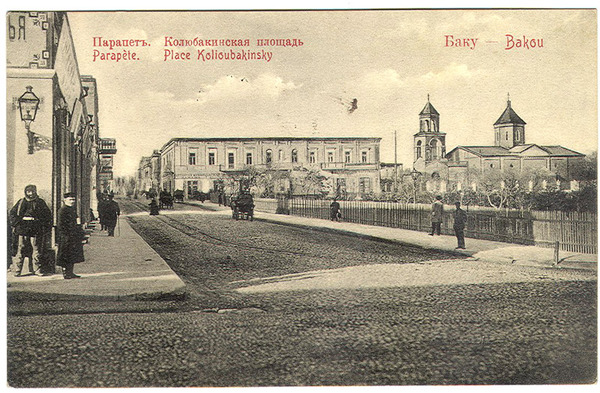
- The Armenian Philanthropic Society in the center of the photograph
- Interactive map of the Armenian Philanthropic Society area

General information
- Status: Presidential Library of Azerbaijan
- Location: Baku, Azerbaijan, 38 Nizami street, Baku, Azerbaijan
- Coordinates: 40.371732°N 49.836838°E
- Completed: 1864

The Armenian Philanthropic Society of Baku or the Martasiragan was a philanthropic organization built and operated by the Armenian community of Baku. It was established in 1863–1864 and became the first philanthropic organization in the Caucasus. In 1870, the Armenian Philanthropic Society established the first library and publication house in Baku. The library was the largest in the Caucasus.

== History ==
The Armenian Philanthropic Society of Baku was founded by Dr. David Rostomyan and Movses Zohrabiants. The structure would be built on 195 Gimnazicheskaya Street (now Leo Tolstoy Street). Rostomyan, who wrote the constitution of the Armenian Philanthropic Society, presented a petition to the local government of Baku to have the Society be built. Once the petition was accepted, the resources for the construction of the Society were provided by donations from wealthy Armenians in Baku and through admission and membership fees. The general purpose of the Society was to aid the poor, promote and construct libraries and schools, raise funds for scholarships, publish books and improve the general welfare of the community. By 1895, the organization eventually subsidized nineteen schools which contained 1,440 students. By 1896, the Society had funded 110,000 roubles worth of projects towards education. The Society also operated a nursery of forty children, a girls' school, an orphanage for 20-30 orphans, a gymnasium, a library, a publication house and educational facilities. By 1899 the Society had 500 members. Many members of the management included prominent Armenian figures such as politician Mikayel Babajanian. The Society also made significant donations to the funding of schools and education of the Armenians in the Ottoman Empire.

During World War I and the September Days the Armenian Philanthropic Society assisted many wounded Armenians. After the September Days, however, the Society suspended its activity.

After the establishment of the Soviet Union in Baku in 1920, the Armenian Philanthropic Society officially ceased operations.

== Library ==
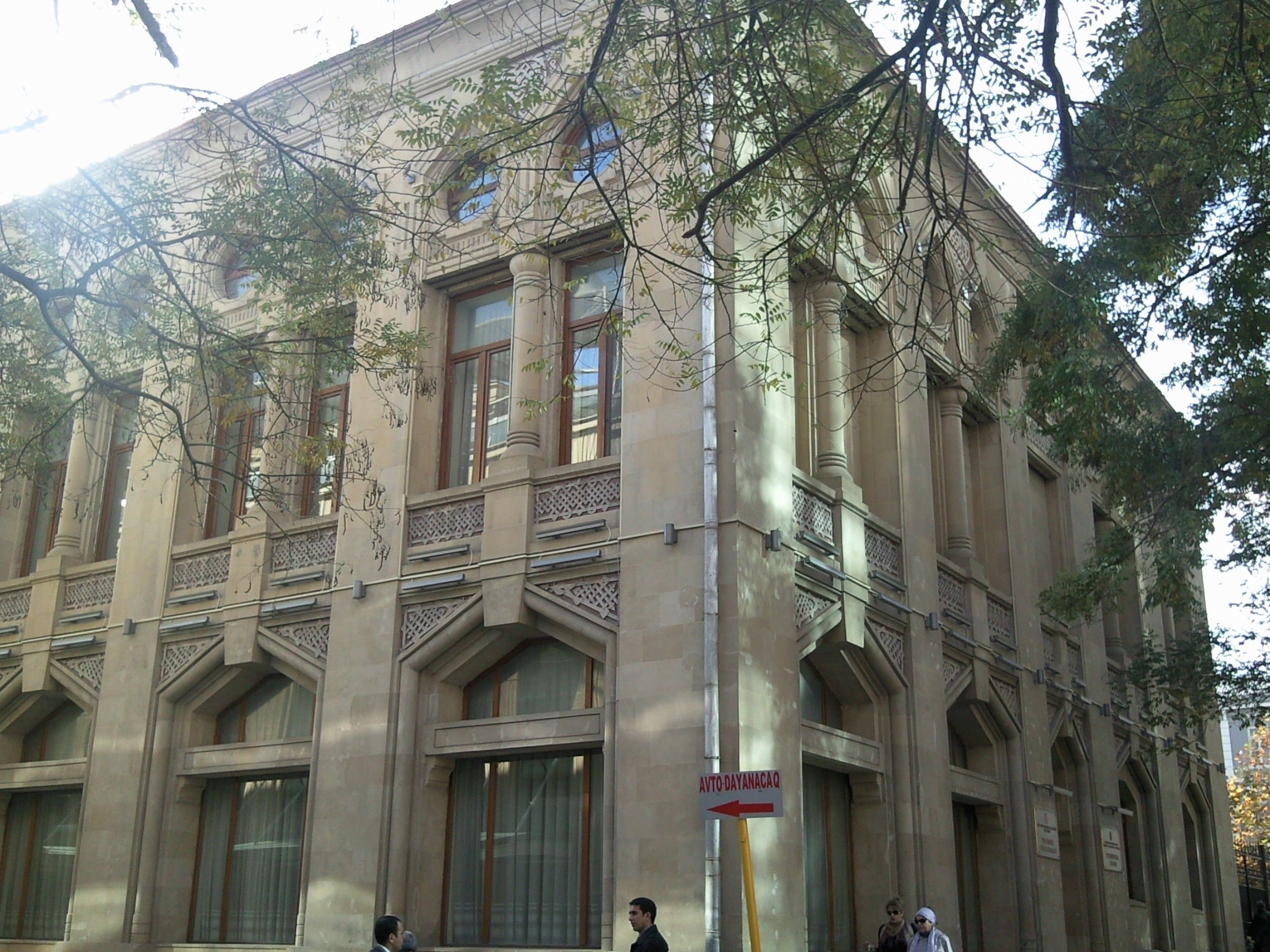
The Armenian Philanthropic Library (now Presidential Library) as it appears today

The Armenian Philanthropic Society had opened a library in 1870 which became the first of its kind in Baku. The library, which contained books in numerous languages, was used by all nationalities. In order to read the books, there was a monthly membership charge of 30 kopecks. The library reportedly had 9,000 books. By 1914, the number of books had risen to 21,800 with 68 periodicals. Many of the librarians would eventually become prominent Armenian intellectuals and writers. Chief among them was playwright Aleksandr Movsisian or more commonly known as Shirvanzade, who was the librarian between 1881 and 1883.

Owing to the strict censorship of the Russian Czarist government, the activities of the library were suspended.

After the construction of the St. Gregory the Illuminator's Church of Baku, the library eventually moved onto its premises in 1913 where it resumed operations.

After the Armenian Philanthropic Society ceased operations, the library was shut down. It was reopened as the Lenin Public Library during the Soviet Union.

After the dissolution of the Soviet Union, the library became known as the Central City Library. In 2003, the Central City Library became the Presidential Library of Azerbaijan and continues to serve Baku residents till this day.

== Legacy ==
Prominent Azerbaijani writer and publicist Hasan bey Zardabi admired the efforts of the Armenian community. Zardabi expressed discontent over the failures of the Muslim population in Baku to construct their own philanthropic organization in 1871. In a 1905 issue of the Hayat newspaper, Zardabi recalled his failed attempts to open a philanthropic organization and exclaimed, "Brothers, compare us with our Armenian neighbors!"

The library was considered the richest in Transcaucasia by the Union of Soviet Writers.
