= Armenian Press of Baku =

The Armenian Press of Baku has been in service for more than 100 years.

This press published its first Armenian periodical of Baku Haykakan Ashkharh (Armenian: Հայկական Աշխարհ, The Armenian World) in 1874. It was a literary and pedagogic journal, which was originally published in Tiflis (Tbilisi), then moved to Shusha in 1874, then to Yelisavetpol (Ganja) in 1875, then to Baku in 1877, and Erivan (Yerevan) in 1879.

In years of 1877–1920, there were more than 60 Armenian historical newspapers published in Baku. However, there are other Armenian newspapers and journals found in Baku which are not the historical types. They include:

- Haykakan Ashkharh (The Armenian World), religious and pedagogic, Baku, 1877–1878, editor and publisher Stephannos Stephaney
- Aror (The Plough) illustrated calendar, Baku, 1893–1896, "Aror" Publishing House
- Sotsialist (The Socialist) official journal of the Social-Democratic Armenian Labor Party, Social Democratic Armenian Party Publishing House, 1904–1905
- Arshaluys (The Dawn), Baku, 1904
- Sotsial Democrat (The Social- Democrat), public affairs journal covering economics and politics, Baku, 1905, editors V. Marsyan and Lazo
- Banvori Tsayn (The Voice of the Labourer), 1906, editor S. Kasyan
- Bari Lur (The Good News) Christian newspaper, official newspaper of the Armenian evangelic community, Baku, Parayan and Mirzoyants Publishing House, 1906–1917, editor and publisher H.J. Tarayants
- Groh (The Attack), Baku, 1906–1907
- Trutsik (Leaflet) weekly, 1906–1907
- Giragnorya Tert (The Sunday Newspaper), Baku, 1906
- Koch Devet (The Appeal), Armenian-Azerbaijani newspaper, Baku, 1906, editors and publishers T. Harutyunyants and I.B. Ashurbekov
- Panvor (The Labourer), public-economic-political-literary newspaper, Baku, Erevantsyan Publishing House, 1907, editors and publishers H. Yuzbahsyan and G. Pijikyan
- Motsak (The Mosquito), satirical newspaper, Baku, 1907, editor H. Khojamir
- Orer (The Days), public-political- literary official newspaper of the Bolsheviks, Baku, 1907, Editors S.K. Shahumyan, Suren Spandaryan, S. Kasyan
- Aniv (The Wheel), literary-economic-political official newspaper of the Social Revolutionaries, Baku, N.A. Erevantsyan Publishing House, 1908, editor and publisher G. Aghajanyan
- Zang (The Bell), literary-public-economic newspaper, Baku, Khatisyan Publishing House, 1908–1909, editor and publisher K. Khatisyan
- Nor Orer (New Days), political-literary-public-economic newspaper, Baku, 1908–09, Erevantsyan Publishing House, 1908–1909, editor and publisher R. Ohanjanyan
- Shepor (The Trumpet), literary-public-economic-newspaper, Baku, N.A. Erevantsyan Publishing House, 1908, Baku, editor and publisher S. Shah-Paronyan
- Patanekan Gradaran (The Juvenile Library), journal, Baku, The Publishing House of the Armenian Cultural Community of Baku, 1908, editor K. Kharatyan
- Aravot (The Morning), literary-public-economic-political newspaper, Baku, N.A. Erevantsyan Publishing House, 1909, editor and publisher S. Harutyunyan
- Zndan (The Dungeon), literary-public-economic-political newspaper, Baku, N.A. Erevantsyan Publishing House, 1909, editor and publisher Nik. P. Izmayelyan
- Ughi (The Way) political-public-economic newspaper, Baku, Erevantsyan Publishing House, 1909, editor and publisher N.H. Qarhanyan
- Tadron ev Erajshtutyun (Theatre and Music), theatrical- musical-literary- artistic illustrated journal, Baku, 1910–17, S.T. Shahbazyan Publishing House, later Trud, editor and publisher A. Mayelyan
- Paros (The Light-house), literary-artistic illustrated weekly, Baku, Erevantsyan Publishing House, 1910, editor and publisher V. Tumanyan
- Koch (The Appeal), literary- public- economic weekly, Baku, Erevantsyan Publishing House, 1911, editor and publisher I.B. Miqayelyan
- Nor Khosq (The New Word), literary-public-political weekly, Baku, Erevantsyan Publishing House, 1911–1912, editor S.K. Shahumyan
- Nor Gyank (New Life), literary- public- political weekly, Baku, Erevantsyan Publishing House, 1911–1912, editor and publisher D. Ter-Danielyan
- Errand (The Ardour), literary-public-economic-political official weekly of the Socialist – Revolutionary Party, Baku, Erevantsyan Publishing House, 1912, editor and publisher V.S. Ghazaryants
- Giragi (The Sunday) Christian weekly, Baku, A. N. Taraeva and L.D Mirzoyants Publishing House, 1912
- Mer Ughin (Our Way), literary-political-economic collection, Baku, Erevantsyan Publishing House, 1912, editor D. Ananun
- Bagvi Tsayn (The Voice of Baku) newspaper, Baku, The Publishing House of the Mayor of Baku, publisher K. Khatisyan
- Lusademin (At the Dawn), literary collection, Baku, Baku Paper Publishing House, 1913–1914, editor A. Alshushyan
- Arev (The Sun) literary- public- political official newspaper of the Social Democratic Party, Shahbazyan Publishing House, 1914–1919, editor Taghyanosyan
- Gordz (The Labour) literary-scientific- public-political journal, Baku, Vera Publishing House, 1917, editor K. Krasilnikyan
- Tsil (The Sprout), Baku, literary-artistic anthology, Baku, Erevantsyan Publishing House, 1914–1915, editor and publisher A. Barutchyan
- Mer Gyank (Our Life), Baku, 1914, editor St. Shahumyan
- Navak (The Boat), literary-public weekly, Baku, Aramazd Publishing House, 1914
- Shavigh (The Path), literary-public journal, Baku, Baku Publishing House, 1914
- Arek (The Sun) literary-public-political daily, Baku, Erevantsyan Publishing House, editor and publisher E. Abovyan
- Never vorberin (A Present for Orphans), Baku, 1915
- Ashxatanqi Droshov (With the Flag of Work), Baku, 1917
- Aroghj Gyank (The Healthy Life), Baku 1917, Erevantsyan Publishing House, editor Zaqaryan
- Banvor (The Labourer), Baku, 1917, Erevantsyan Publishing House, editor and publisher G. Pijikyan
- Nor Kyanq (The Life), Baku, 1917, Erevantsyan Publishing House, editor E. Ter-Ohanyan
- Haraj (The Forward) public-political daily, Baku, 1917
- Mer gordz (Our Work) Baku, 1917, Erevantsyan Publishing House, editor A. Stepanyan
- Mer Orer (Our days), social-democratic official newspaper, Baku, 1917
- Sotsial Democrat (The Social Democrat), Baku, 1917
- Veratcnund (The Renaissance), Baku, 1917
- Ashkhatavori Tsayn (The Voice of the Worker), Baku, 1918
- Banvor, Zinvor ev Navasti patgamavorneri khorhrdi teghekatu (The Herald of the Labourer, Soldier and Sailor Delegates’ Council), Baku, 1918
- Banvori khosq (The Word of Laborer), Baku, 1918
- Shepor (The Trumpet), Baku, 1918, editor and publisher E. Palyan
- Teghekatu (The Reference Book), Baku, 1918
- Yerkir (The Country), political-public- literary newspaper, Baku, 1919, editor I Amiryan
- Komunist (The Communist), official newspaper of the Communist Party of Azerbaijan and Baku Commune, Baku, 1920
- Teghekagir (The Official Gazette), journal of the Central Committee of the Communist Party of Azerbaijan, Baku, 1920–1921.
