= Freidun Aghalyan =

Armenian architect

Freidun Aghalyan (November 20, 1876, in Shusha, Russian Empire – February 1, 1944, in Yerevan) was an Armenian architect.

In 1903, Aghalian finished a building for the Saint-Petersburg Institute of Civil Engineering. Between 1903 & 1921 he oversaw the construction of railroad bridges, gymnasia, the Treasury palace and Workers' House in Baku, and the Armenian church of Armavir, Russia.

In 1921, he moved to Yerevan, here he headed the construction department of Kanaker. He was the author of Kanaker HES and several other buildings in Yerevan, Kanaker and Getamej. After 1917, Aghalian also worked as a lecturer in Baku and then in Yerevan.

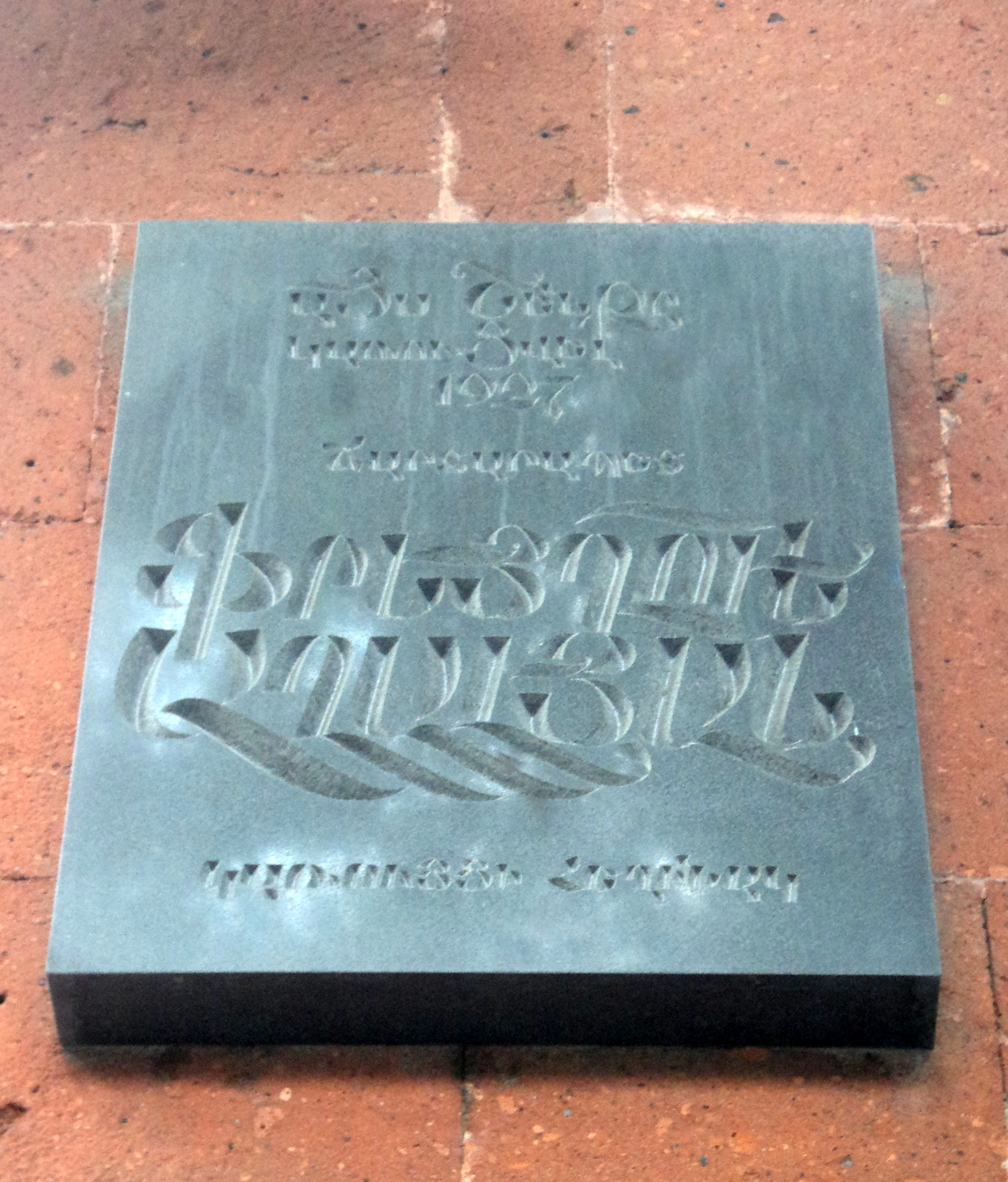
Freidun Aghalyan's plaque in Yerevan

== Sources ==
- Concise Armenian Encyclopedia, Ed. by. acad. K. Khudaverdyan, Book 1, Yerevan, 1990, p. 121
