= Sarkis Kasyan =

Armenian Soviet statesman, politician, publicist and journalist

- Սարգիս Կասյան
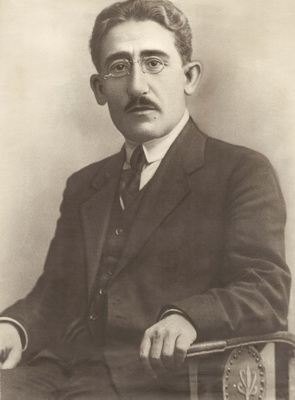

Chairman of the Central Executive Committee of the Armenian SSR
- In office July 1928 – December 1930
- Preceded by: Artashes Karinyan
- Succeeded by: Armen Ananyan

Personal details
- Born: 28 January 1876 Shushi, Elizavetpol Governorate, Russian Empire
- Died: December 11, 1937 (aged 61) Unknown
- Party: RSDLP (Bolsheviks) (1905–1918); Russian Communist Party (1918–1937)
- Other political affiliations: Communist Party of Armenia
- Education: Berlin University
- Occupation: Publicist, writer

Sarkis Hovhannesi Kasyan or Kasian (Note: Armenian: Սարգիս Հովհաննեսի Կասյան; Russian: Саркис Иванович (Оганесович) Касьян) (né Ter-Kasparyan; January 28 [O.S. January 16], 1876 – December 11, 1937) was a Soviet Armenian statesman, politician, publicist and journalist.

He was arrested and later shot in 1937 during the Great Purge. He was posthumously rehabilitated.

== Biography ==
Sarkis Kasyan, whose real surname was Ter-Kasparyan, was born on January 28, 1876, in the town of Shusha in the Elisabethpol Governorate of the Russian Empire. During his childhood, his family moved to Baku, where he attended the Baku Realschule. There, Kasyan began participating in underground student organizations and reading banned literature. He was expelled from school in the seventh grade for disobedience.

Kasyan left for Germany in 1900 and graduated from the Leipzig Commercial Institute (Handelshochschule Leipzig) and the Faculty of Philosophy of Berlin University in 1904. After graduating, he returned to Baku. From 1903 to 1904, he was a supporter of the Social Democrat Hunchakian Party's left wing. He was a member of the Bolshevik faction of the Russian Social Democratic Labour Party from 1905.

He was one of the founders of Armenian Bolshevik press in 1905, and worked at a number of Bolshevik newspapers based in Tiflis (Tbilisi) and Baku. He headed the Tiflis communist party organization from 1912 to 1914. From 1914 to 1917 he was in exile in Astrakhan and Vologda. From 1919 to 1920 he was chairman of the Armenian committee of the Russian Communist (Bolshevik) Party.

Kasyan was one of the signatories of a secret decision made in September 1920 by the leadership of the Communist Party of Armenia which called on members to work to "speed up Armenia's defeat" in the Turkish–Armenian War and "dissolve the Armenian army by all means."

From November 1920 he was a member of the Central Committee of the Communist Party of Armenia and chairman of the Revolutionary Committee of Armenia. He signed the declaration of the Sovietization of Armenia. On December 2, 1920, Vladimir Lenin sent him a telegram welcoming the establishment of Soviet Armenia.

From 1927 to 1931 he was the chairman of the All-Caucasian Central Executive Committee, and from 1928 to 1930 he was also the chairman of the All-Armenian Central Executive Committee. He was elected a member of the All-Union Central Executive Committee. From 1931 to 1934 he was chairman of the Supreme Court of the Transcaucasian SFSR. In 1937, during the Great Purge, Kasyan was arrested and charged with organizing "a right-wing terrorist organization and armed groups" in Tbilisi in order to assassinate party and government leadership. He was shot on December 11, 1937. He was posthumously rehabilitated.

Besides his own political writings, Kasyan translated works by Karl Marx and Friedrich Engels into Armenian. Until 2023, there was a street named after him in Yerevan․ Given his deep unpopularity stemming from his association with the establishment of the Soviet regime over Armenia, authorities renamed it Vazgen I Street.

== Works ==
- Kasyan, Sargis (1967). Aghayan, Ts. P.; et al. (eds.). Ěntir erker [Selected works] (in Armenian). Yerevan: Hayastan. OCLC 68195843.
