= Saint Thaddeus and Bartholomew Cathedral =

Armenian church in Baku, Azerbaijan

Coordinates: 40°22′38″N 49°50′40″E

Saint Thaddeus and Bartholomew Cathedral Surp Tadevos-Barduğimeos Erməni Kilsəsi Սուրբ Թադևոս-Բարդուղիմեոս Մայր Տաճար Церковь Святого Фаддея и Варфоломея
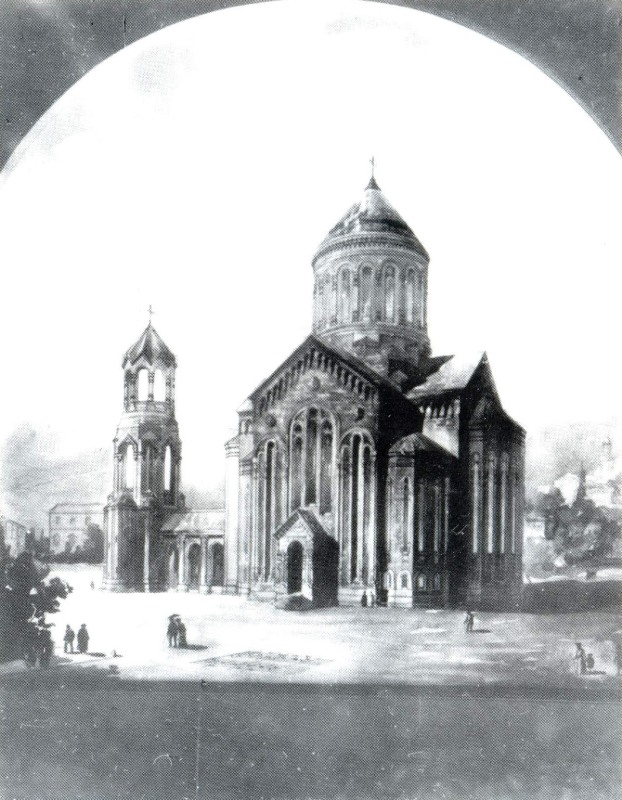
- Saint Thaddeus and Bartholomew Armenian Cathedral in Baku

Religion
- Affiliation: Armenian Apostolic Church
- Status: destroyed in 1937

Location
- Location: Baku, Russian Empire
- Interactive map of Saint Thaddeus and Bartholomew Cathedral; Surp Tadevos-Barduğimeos Erməni Kilsəsi; Սուրբ Թադևոս-Բարդուղիմեոս Մայր Տաճար; Церковь Святого Фаддея и Варфоломея

Architecture
- Architect: Hovhannes Kajaznuni
- Type: Cruciform style Armenian church
- Style: Armenian
- Completed: 1910, consecrated 1911

Saint Thaddeus and Bartholomew Cathedral (Armenian: Սուրբ Թադևոս-Բարդուղիմեոս Մայր Տաճար, Russian: Церковь Святого Фаддея и Варфоломея, Azerbaijani: Surp Tadevos-Barduğimeos Erməni Kilsəsi), also known as the Budagovski Cathedral, was an Armenian Apostolic church in Baku, Azerbaijan, built in 1910 and consecrated in 1911. It was located on the Bondarnaya-Dmitrova street (now known as Shamsi Badalbeyli street).

Construction began on 2 August 1907 and was completed in 1910. The architect of the church was Hovhannes Kajaznuni.

As part of the policy of destruction of religious buildings of the USSR government, the cathedral was demolished in 1930, to be replaced with the building of the Baku Academy of Music.

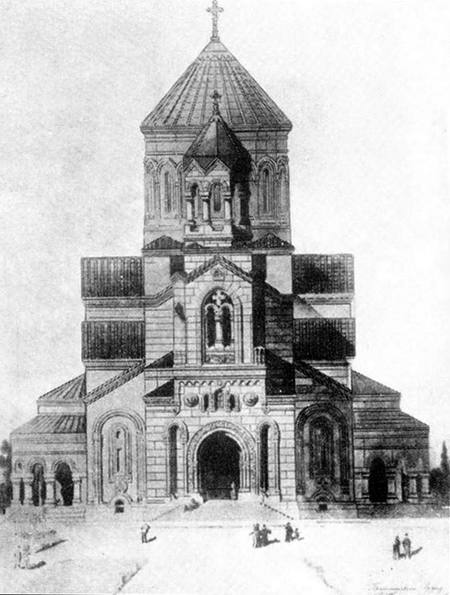
Saint Thaddeus and Bartholomew Cathedral

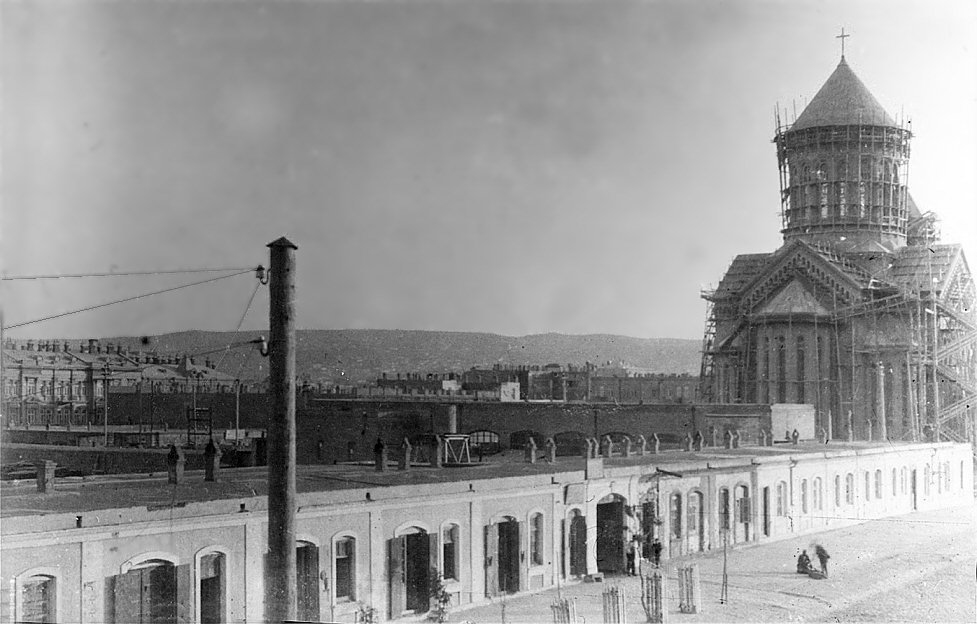
Construction of Cathedral in 1914 Baku
