= List of Armenian Azerbaijanis =

This is a list of notable people of Armenian Azerbaijani descent.

== Art ==
- Arif Gaziyev - painter, sculptor and People's Artist of Azerbaijan (2018).
- Ashig Alasgar – 19th-century poet and folk singer
- Mirza Gadim Iravani – Azeri painter of the mid-19th century
- Sabir Rizayev – Armenian Soviet film scholar, critic, writer and drama, Honored Artist of the Armenian SSR (1975)
- Said Rustamov – Azerbaijani composer and conductor
- Huseyn Seyidzadeh – Azerbaijani film director

== Scientists ==
- Ahliman Amiraslanov – Azerbaijani physician
- Heydar Huseynov – Azerbaijani philosopher
- Mustafa Topchubashov – prominent Soviet surgeon and academician, Chairman of the Supreme Soviet of Azerbaijan SSR (1953–1955 and 1967–1971), Hero of Socialist Labor

== Politicians ==
- Ismat Abbasov – Minister of Agriculture of Azerbaijan (since 2004)
- Avaz Alakbarov – Azerbaijani economist, Minister of Finance of Azerbaijan (1999–2006)
- Aziz Aliyev – People's Commissariat for Health of the Azerbaijan SSR (1939–1941), Secretary of the Dagestan Regional Committee of the Communist Party (1942–1948)
- Ogtay Asadov – Speaker of the National Assembly of Azerbaijan (since 2005)
- Zulfi Hajiyev – Deputy Prime Minister of Azerbaijan, Member of Azerbaijani Parliament
- Nariman Imranov – Minister of National Security of Azerbaijan (1992–1993) (ru:Имранов, Нариман Шамо оглы)
- Khalaf Khalafov – Deputy Minister of the Foreign Affairs Ministry
- Garib Mammadov – Chairman of State Land and Cartography Committee of Azerbaijan Republic
- Husein Mammadov – Chairman of the Supreme Council of Nakhchivan ASSR (1952–1964)
- Misir Mardanov – Minister of Education of Azerbaijan (since 1998)
- Shahin Mustafayev – Minister of Economic Development of Azerbaijan (since 2008)
- Hidayat Orujov – Azerbaijani writer and ambassador to Kyrgyzstan
- Hasan Seyidov – Minister of Agriculture of the Azerbaijan SSR (1955–1959)
- Mammad agha Shahtakhtinski – Azerbaijani linguist and public figure
- Akbar agha Sheykhulislamov – Minister of Agriculture of Azerbaijan Democratic Republic (1918–1920)
- Ali Insanov – Minister of Health of Azerbaijan (1993–2005)

== Sports ==
- Ramazan Abbasov – Azerbaijani football player
- Rovshan Huseynov – Azerbaijani boxer
- Khagani Mammadov – Azerbaijani football player

== Military ==
- Mehdi Abbasov – National Hero of Azerbaijan
- Shovgiyar Abdullayev – National Hero of Azerbaijan
- Asad Ahmadov – National Hero of Azerbaijan
- Agil Guliyev – National Hero of Azerbaijan
- Etibar Hajiyev – National Hero of Azerbaijan
- Farhad Humbatov – National Hero of Azerbaijan
- Miralakbar Ibrahimov – National Hero of Azerbaijan
- Fakhraddin Jabrayılov – National Hero of Azerbaijan
- Eldar Khalilov – National Hero of Azerbaijan
- Sakhavat Maharramov – National Hero of Azerbaijan
- Sahil Mammadov – National Hero of Azerbaijan
- Khydyr Mustafayev – Hero of the Soviet Union
- Yahya Rahim Safavi – Major General, Chief commander of AGIR (1997–2007)
- Habib bey Salimov – Major-General of Azerbaijan Democratic Republic (ru:Салимов, Габиб-бек)
- Mehman Sayadov – National Hero of Azerbaijan

== Others ==
- Firudin Agayev – Hero of Socialist Labor

== See also ==
- Azerbaijanis in Armenia
- List of Azerbaijanis
- List of Azerbaijani Armenians
