= Balakend =

Balakend or Balakənd may refer to:

- Dovekh, Armenia
- Balakend, Gadabay, Azerbaijan
- Balakend, Saatly, Azerbaijan
- Balakənd, Sabirabad, Azerbaijan
