= Armenians in Azerbaijan =

Armenians living in Azerbaijan

Հայերն Ադրբեջանում Azərbaycan erməniləri

Total population
- 178 (2019)

Regions with significant populations
- Baku

Languages
- Armenian, Azerbaijani

Religion
- Armenian Apostolic Church

Related ethnic groups
- Armenians in Nakhchivan, Armenians in Baku, Armenians in Russia, Armenians in Georgia

Armenians in Azerbaijan (Armenian: Հայերն Ադրբեջանում, romanized: Hayern Adrbejanum; Azerbaijani: Azərbaycan erməniləri) are the Armenians who lived in great numbers in the modern state of Azerbaijan and its precursor, Soviet Azerbaijan. According to the statistics, about 500,000 Armenians lived in Soviet Azerbaijan prior to the outbreak of the First Nagorno-Karabakh War in 1988. Most of the Armenians in Azerbaijan had to flee the republic, like Azerbaijanis in Armenia, in the events leading up to the First Nagorno-Karabakh War, a result of the ongoing Armenian-Azerbaijani conflict. Atrocities directed against the Armenian population took place in Sumgait (February 1988), Ganja (Kirovabad, November 1988) and Baku (January 1990). Armenians continued to live in large numbers in the region of Nagorno-Karabakh, which was controlled by the break-away state known as the Nagorno-Karabakh Republic from 1991 until 2023 when the region was incorporated into Azerbaijan using military force. After the Azerbaijani takeover, almost all Armenians living in Nagorno-Karabakh were expelled to Armenia.

Before the Nagorno-Karabakh conflict, Armenians were Azerbaijan’s third-largest minority but by 1999 their official number outside of Nagorno-Karabakh had dropped to 645, while the true figure is estimated to be about 3000, since many have changed their names due to mixed marriages or to avoid harassment. Many of the Armenians that remain in Azerbaijan are likely to be elderly, sick, or with no other family members.

Armenians in Azerbaijan are at a great risk as long as the Nagorno-Karabakh conflict remains unsettled. In Azerbaijan, the status of Armenians is precarious. Armenians in Azerbaijan face severe limitations on cultural expression, freedom of speech, and political participation, and often conceal their identity by changing names and avoiding public visibility. Those who remain in Azerbaijan keep a low profile, refraining from practicing their religion or speaking Armenian in public. They live with persistent fear, isolation, and exclusion, relying on anonymity or social integration for safety. Armenian churches remain closed because of the large emigration of Armenians and fear of Azerbaijani attacks.

== History ==
=== Armenians in Nagorno-Karabakh ===
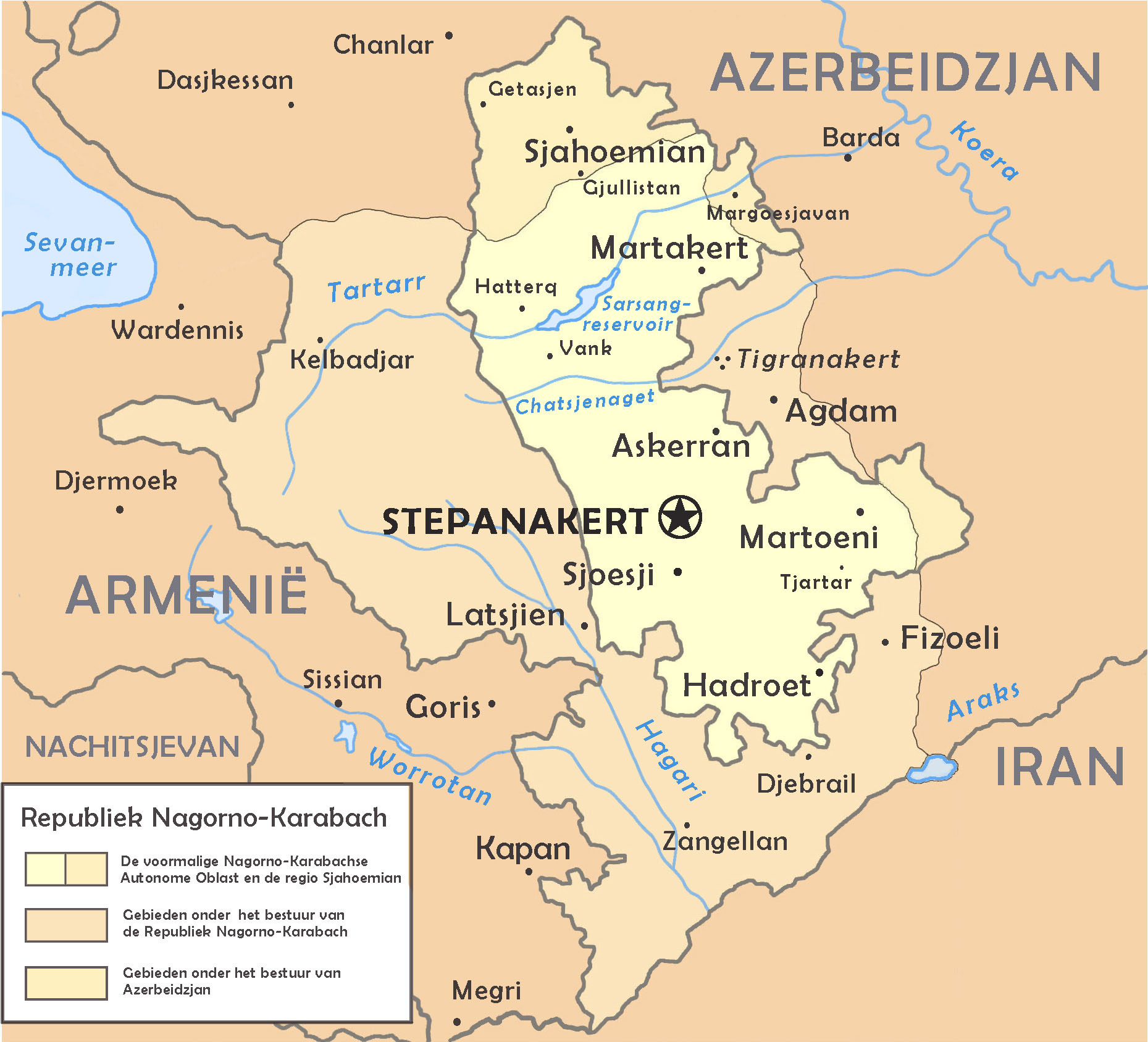
Map of the breakaway Nagorno-Karabakh Republic prior to the Second Nagorno-Karabakh War.

After the 1994 ceasefire ethnic Armenian militia from Nagorno-Karabakh controlled almost 9% of Azerbaijan's territory outside the former Nagorno-Karabakh Autonomous Oblast and Azerbaijani forces controlled Shahumian and the eastern parts of Martakert and Martuni.

Up until August 2023, Armenians had lived in the Karabakh region since the period of antiquity. In the beginning of the 2nd century BC. Karabakh became a part of Armenian Kingdom as province of Artsakh. In the 14th century, a local Armenian leadership emerged, consisting of five noble dynasties led by princes, who held the titles of meliks and were referred to as Khamsa (five in Arabic). The Armenian meliks maintained control over the region until the 18th century. In the early 16th century, control of the region passed to the Safavid dynasty, which created the Ganja-Karabakh province (beylerbeydom, bəylərbəylik). Despite these conquests, the population of Upper Karabakh remained largely Armenian.

Karabakh passed to Imperial Russia by the Kurekchay Treaty, signed between the Khan of Karabakh and Tsar Alexander I of Russia in 1805, and later further formalized by the Russo-Persian Treaty of Gulistan in 1813, before the rest of Transcaucasia was incorporated into the Empire in 1828 by the Treaty of Turkmenchay. In 1822, the Karabakh khanate was dissolved, and the area became part of the Elizavetpol Governorate within the Russian Empire.

After the Russian Revolution of 1917, Karabakh became part of the Transcaucasian Democratic Federative Republic, but this soon dissolved into separate Armenian, Azerbaijani, and Georgian states. Over the next two years (1918–1920), there were a series of short wars between Armenia and Azerbaijan over several regions, including Karabakh. In July 1918, the First Armenian Assembly of Nagorno-Karabakh declared the region self-governing and created a National Council and government. In September 1918, Azerbaijani–Ottoman forces captured the city of Shusha, the capital of the Karabakh Council, however, were unable to penetrate the countryside due to the efforts of local Armenians. Following the Armistice of Mudros on 30 October 1918, Ottoman forces were obligated to withdraw from the South Caucasus, including Shusha, after which their garrison was supplemented by the British. On 15 January 1919, the British governor of Baku, General Thomson appointed Khosrov bey Sultanov the "Governor-General of Karabakh and Zangezur" within Azerbaijan, despite neither region being completely under Azerbaijani control. On 5 June 1919, due to the refusal of the Karabakh assembly to submit to Azerbaijani authority as prescribed by British command, 2,000 mounted Kurdish irregulars led by the Sultan bey Sultanov—the brother of Khosrov—looted several Armenian villages in the outskirts of Shushi including Khaibalikend, Krkejan, Pahliul, Jamillu, and several remote hamlets resulting in the deaths of some 600 Armenians. As a result of the bloodshed, the Karabakh Council was compelled to sign a provisional accord with the Azerbaijani government on 22 August 1919, submitted to their rule pending their final status decided in the Paris Peace Conference.

As the Paris Peace Conference was inconclusive on the issue of the South Caucasus territorial disputes, on 19 February 1920 Khosrov bey Sultanov issued an ultimatum to the Karabakh Council to consent to the region's permanent incorporation into Azerbaijan. During meetings of the Eighth Assembly of Armenians of Karabakh from 28 February to 4 March, the delegates expressed discontent with the Azerbaijani administration and warned that they would resort to countermeasures if their existence was threatened. In the uprising that followed, due to the unsuccessful attempt by local Armenian forces to disarm the Azerbaijani garrisons in Shusha and Khankend, the former befell a pogrom which saw the Armenian half of the town looted and destroyed, with its Armenian inhabitants evicted and 500–20,000 massacred.

In April 1920, while the Azerbaijani army was locked in Karabakh fighting local Armenian forces, Azerbaijan was taken over by Bolsheviks. Subsequently, the disputed areas of Nagorno-Karabakh, Zangezur, and Nakhchivan came under the control of Armenia. During July and August 1920, however, the Red Army occupied mountainous Karabakh, Zangezur, and part of Nakhchivan. Later on, for basically political reasons, the Soviet Union agreed to a division under which Zangezur would fall under the control of Armenia, while Karabakh and Nakhchivan would be under the control of Azerbaijan. In addition, the mountainous part of Karabakh that had come to be named Nagorno-Karabakh was granted an autonomous status as the Nagorno-Karabakh Autonomous Oblast, giving Armenians more rights than were given to Azerbaijanis in Armenia and enabling Armenians to be appointed to key positions and attend schools in their first language.

With the Soviet Union firmly in control of the region, the conflict over the region died down for several decades. The Armenians in Karabakh were not repressed to a substantial extent. Local schools offered education in Armenian but taught Azerbaijani history and not the history of the Armenian people; the population had access to Armenian-language television broadcast by a Stepanakert-based channel controlled from Baku, and later directly from Armenia as well, though in an unfavourable manner. Unlike in Baku, cases of mixed Armenian-Azerbaijani marriages in Nagorno-Karabakh were very rare. The autonomy of Nagorno-Karabakh led to the rise of Armenian nationalism and the Armenians' determination in claiming independence. With the beginning of the dissolution of the Soviet Union in the late 1980s and early 1990s, the question of Nagorno-Karabakh re-emerged.

=== Armenians in Ganja ===
In 1918, 69,000 Armenians of the Elizavetpol uezd (modern-day Dashkasan, Gadabay, Goranboy, and Shamkir districts) submitted to Azerbaijani demands to disarm due to their geographic isolation from Armenia, which was unable to incorporate the region. As they had cooperated with Nuri Pasha's ultimatum, the local Armenians were spared from massacre, however, they experienced difficulties in tending to their fields (100 of whom were killed whilst doing so) and traversing roads where they were attacked by "disgruntled refugees" and "lawless bands" who were also raiding the properties of local khans and beys ("chiefs"; "lords"). On 9 April 1920, at the height of the Armenian–Azerbaijani war and the clashes in the Kazakh uezd, Azerbaijani soldiers burned the Armenian villages of Badakend (Balakend) and Chardakhly (Çardaqlı) in the region.

In 1991, according to Human Rights Watch, Azerbaijani OMON and Soviet military forces jointly started "a campaign of violence to disperse Armenian villagers from areas north and south of Nagorno-Karabakh, a territorial enclave in Azerbaijan where Armenian communities have lived for centuries".

"However, the unstated goal was to "convince" the villagers half are pensioners to relocate permanently in Armenia." This military action was officially called "Operation Ring", because its basic strategy consists of surrounding villages (included Martunashen and Chaykand) with tanks and armored personnel carriers and shelling them. Azerbaijani villagers were allowed to come and loot the empty Armenian villages—by the end of the operation, more than ten thousand Armenian villagers were forced to leave Azerbaijan.

=== Armenians in Nakhchivan ===
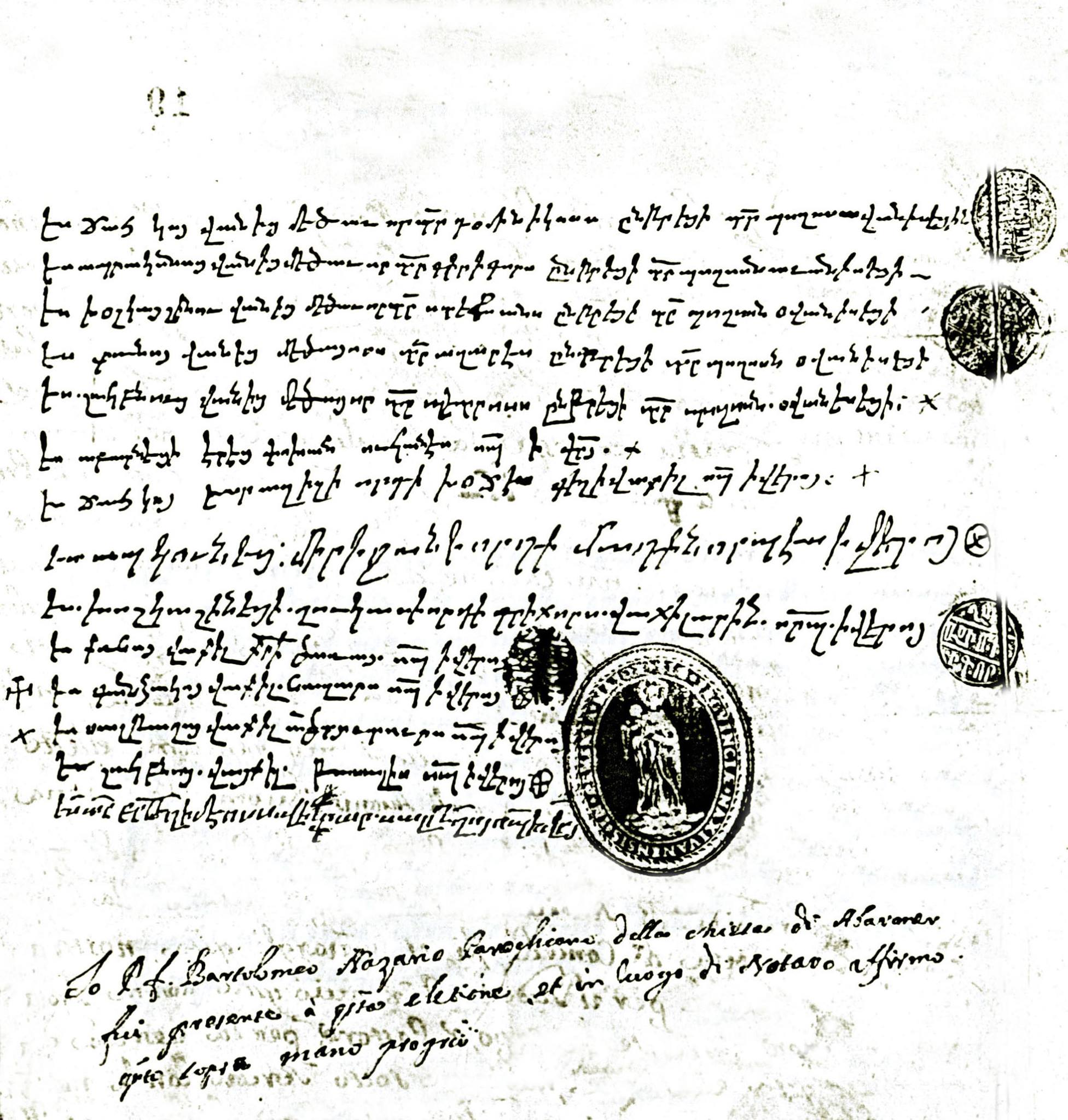
Document about election of the Head of the Armenian Catholic Diocese of Nakhichevan, 1691

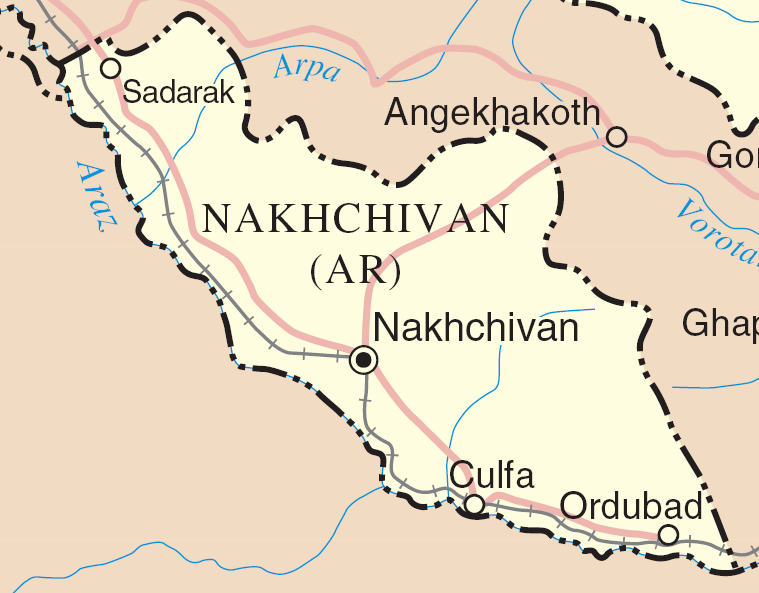
The Nakhchivan Autonomous Republic of Azerbaijan.

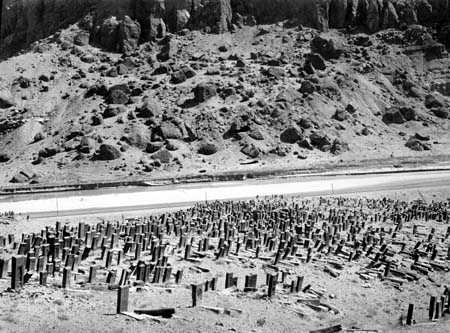
The cemetery at Julfa depicted in a photograph taken in 1915.

==== Antiquity ====
Armenians had a historic presence in Nakhchivan (In Armenian Նախիջևան, Nakhijevan). According to an Armenian tradition, Nakhchivan was founded by Noah, of the Abrahamic religions. It became part of the Satrapy of Armenia under Achaemenid Persia c. 521 BC. In 189 BC, Nakhchivan was part of the new Kingdom of Armenia established by Artaxias I. In 428, the Armenian Arshakuni monarchy was abolished and Nakhchivan was annexed by Sassanid Persia. In 623 AD, possession of the region passed to the Byzantine Empire. Nakhchivan itself became part of the autonomous Principality of Armenia under Arab control. After the fall of the Arab rule in the 9th century, the area became the domain of several Muslim emirates of Arran and Azerbaijan. Nakhchivan became part of the Seljuk Empire in the 11th century, followed by becoming the capital of the Atabegs of Azerbaijan in the 12th century. In the 1220s it was plundered by Khwarezmians and Mongols. In the 15th century, the weakening Mongol rule in Nakhchivan was forced out by the Turcoman dynasties of Kara Koyunlu and Ak Koyunlu.

In the 16th century, control of Nakhchivan passed to the Safavid dynasty of Persia. In 1604, Shah Abbas I Safavi, concerned that the lands of Nakhchivan and the surrounding areas would pass into Ottoman hands, decided to institute a scorched earth policy. He forced the entire local population, Armenians, Jews and Muslims alike, to leave their homes and move to the Persian provinces south of the Aras River. Many of the deportees were settled in the neighborhood of Isfahan that was named New Julfa since most of the residents were from the original Julfa (a predominantly Armenian town).

After the last Russo-Persian War and the Treaty of Turkmenchay, the Nakhchivan khanate passed into Russian possession in 1828. The Nakhchivan khanate was dissolved, and its territory was merged with the territory of the Erivan khanate and the area became the Nakhichevan uezd of the new Armenian Oblast, which was reformed into the Erivan Governorate in 1849. A resettlement policy implemented by the Russian authorities encouraged massive Armenian immigration to Nakhchivan from various parts of the Ottoman Empire and Persia. According to official statistics of the Russian Empire, by the turn of the 20th century Azerbaijanis made up 57% of the uezd's population, while Armenians constituted 42%.

During the Russian Revolution of 1905, conflict erupted between the Armenians and the Azerbaijanis, culminating in the Armenian-Tatar massacres. In the final year of World War I, Nakhchivan was the scene of more bloodshed between Armenians and Azerbaijanis, who both laid claim to the area. By 1914, the Armenian population was at 40% while the Azerbaijani population increased to roughly 60%. After the February Revolution, the region was under the authority of the Special Transcaucasian Committee of the Russian Provisional Government and subsequently of the short-lived Transcaucasian Democratic Federative Republic. When the TDFR was dissolved in May 1918, Nakhchivan, Nagorno-Karabakh, Zangezur (today the Armenian province of Syunik and part of Vayots Dzor), and Qazakh were heavily contested between the newly formed and short-lived states of the Democratic Republic of Armenia (DRA) and the Azerbaijan Democratic Republic (ADR). In June 1918, the region came under Ottoman occupation. Under the terms of the Armistice of Mudros, the Ottomans agreed to pull their troops out of the Transcaucasus to make way for the forthcoming British military presence.

After a brief British occupation and the fragile peace they tried to impose, in December 1918, with the support of Azerbaijan's Musavat Party, Jafargulu Khan Nakhchivanski declared the Republic of Aras in the Nakhichevan uezd of the former Yerevan Governorate assigned to Armenia by Wardrop. The Armenian government did not recognize the new state and sent its troops into the region to take control of it. The conflict soon erupted into the violent Aras War. By mid-June 1919, however, Armenia succeeded in establishing control over Nakhchivan and the whole territory of the self-proclaimed republic. The fall of the Aras republic triggered an invasion by the regular Azerbaijani army and by the end of July, Armenian troops were forced to leave Nakhchivan City to the Azerbaijanis. In mid-March 1920, Armenian forces launched an offensive on all of the disputed territories, and by the end of the month both the Nakhchivan and Zangezur regions came under stable but temporary Armenian control. In July 1920, the 11th Soviet Red Army invaded and occupied the region and on July 28, declared the Nakhchivan Autonomous Soviet Socialist Republic with "close ties" to the Azerbaijan SSR. A referendum was called for the people of Nakhchivan to be consulted. According to the formal figures of this referendum, held at the beginning of 1921, 90% of Nakhchivan's population wanted to be included in the Azerbaijan SSR "with the rights of an autonomous republic." The decision to make Nakhchivan a part of modern-day Azerbaijan was cemented March 16, 1921, in the Treaty of Moscow between Bolshevist Russia and Turkey. The agreement between the Soviet Russia and Turkey also called for attachment of the former Sharur-Daralayaz uezd (which had a solid Azerbaijani majority) to Nakhchivan, thus allowing Turkey to share a border with the Azerbaijan SSR. This deal was reaffirmed on 23 October 1921 by the Treaty of Kars.

===== During the Soviet Era =====
In the years following the establishment of Soviet rule, Nakhchivan saw a significant demographic shift in what many sources have characterized as ethnic cleansing. Its Armenian population gradually decreased as many emigrated. According to statistics published by the Imperial Russian government in 1916, Armenians made up 40% of the population of the Nakhchivan uezd. The borders of the uezd were redrawn and in the 1926 all-Soviet census 11% of region's population was Armenian. By 1979 this number had shrunk to 1.4%. The Azerbaijani population, meanwhile increased substantially with both a higher birth rate and immigration (growing from 85% in 1926 to 96% by 1979). The Armenian population saw a great reduction in their numbers throughout the years repatriating to Armenia and elsewhere.

Some Armenian political groupings of the Republic of Armenia and the Armenian diaspora, among them most notably the Armenian Revolutionary Federation (ARF) claim that Nakhchivan should belong to Armenia. However, Nakhchivan is not officially claimed by the government of Armenia. But huge Armenian religious and cultural remnants are witness of the historic presence of Armenians in the Nakhchivan region. Recently the Medieval Armenian cemetery of Jugha (Julfa) in Nakhchivan, regarded by Armenians as the biggest and most precious repository of medieval headstones marked with Christian crosses – khachkars (of which more than 2,000 were still there in the late 1980s), has completely been destroyed by Azerbaijani soldiers in 2006.

=== Armenians in the Greater Caucasus slopes ===
A year prior to the Russian Revolution, there were 80 thousand Armenians in the districts on the foothills of the Greater Caucasus Mountains (in the districts of Aresh, Geokchay, Nukha, Shemakha, and Zakatal), the territory of all was inherited by Azerbaijan. Most of the Armenian towns and villages in these districts were destroyed by the Azerbaijani–Ottoman advance against the Baku Commune in late 1918. By 1919, 23 Armenian parochial schools in Shemakha had been closed, and slightly more than 10% of the district's pre-revolution Armenian population survived as evidenced by the 33 wagonloads of their bones. In the Aresh and Nukha districts of the Elizavetpol Governorate, only 3 of 51 Armenian and Udi villages remained, indicating the massacre of 25,000 and the kidnappings of thousands of Armenian girls and women by Azerbaijani and Turkish officers. 48 Armenian villages were destroyed and the female population kidnapped and raped. By 1919, only half of the two districts' Armenian population had survived, forced into the remaining three villages of Nidzh (Nij), Vardashen (Oğuz), and Jalut (Calut). The remaining villages were later destroyed in March 1920 in retaliation for the uprising in Nagorno-Karabakh—causing the survivors to flee up into the Greater Caucasus Mountains or to Georgia. Many of these Armenians were forced into labor by beys, and were often unable to reclaim their stolen possessions. One of the Armenian deputies in Azerbaijan's parliament denounced the treatment of the Armenians in the Greater Caucasus slopes, but their appeals were ignored by the government of Azerbaijan. 1,500 Armenians from this region were later resettled in the Etchmiadzin and Surmalu uezds ("counties") of Armenia.

== Conditions today ==
The Armenians still remaining in Azerbaijan practically live in virtual hiding, and have also changed their Armenian names and surnames to Azerbaijani names because they have to maintain an extremely low profile to avoid harassment and physical attacks. They have continued to complain (in private due to fear of attacks) that they remain subject to harassment and human rights violations and therefore have to hide their identity. According to a 1993 United States Immigration and naturalization service report:

It is clear that Armenians are the target of violence from societal forces and that the Azerbaijani government is unable or in some instances unwilling to control the violence or acts of discrimination and harassment. Some sectors of the government, such as the Department of Visas and Registrations mentioned above, appear unwilling to enforce the governments stated policy on minorities. As long as the Armenian-Azeri conflict over the fate of Karabakh continues, and possibly long after a settlement is reached, Armenian inhabitants of Azerbaijan will have no guarantees of physical safety.

A report by the European Commission against Racism and Intolerance (ECRI) released in May 2011 found that their conditions had barely improved. It found that:

...people of Armenian origin are at risk of being discriminated against in their daily lives. Certain people born of mixed Armenian-Azerbaijani marriages choose to use the name of their Azerbaijani parent so as to avoid problems in their contacts with officialdom; others who did not immediately apply for Azerbaijani identity documents when the former Soviet passports were done away with today encounter difficulties in obtaining identity papers.

It further expressed concern over the "fact that the constant negative official and media discourse concerning the Republic of Armenia helps to sustain a negative climate of opinion regarding people of Armenian origin coming under the Azerbaijani authorities' jurisdiction." It recommended that the government "work actively to improve the climate of opinion concerning Armenians coming under Azerbaijan’s jurisdiction."

During the Second Nagorno-Karabakh War large parts of the Armenian-controlled Republic of Artsakh were captured by Azerbaijan. While most of the Armenian residents fled in advance of the Azerbaijani army, with Armenian cities such as Hadrut being entirely depopulated, the few who remained behind were mistreated or even killed by Azerbaijani soldiers. There have also been numerous reports that Armenian prisoners of war were tortured and nineteen were executed in captivity. Armenian soldiers were also brutally mistreated, including multiple instances of beheadings recorded on video.

== Famous Armenians from Azerbaijan ==
- Hovhannes Bagramyan Army Commander, Marshal of the Soviet Union
- Hovannes Adamian, designer of color television
- Alexander Shirvanzade, playwright and novelist, awarded by the "People's Writer of Armenia" and "People's Writer of Azerbaijan" titles
- Boris Babaian, pioneering creator of supercomputers in the Soviet Union
- Armen Ohanian, an Armenian dancer, actress, writer and translator
- Alexey Ekimyan, composer and police general
- Garry Kasparov, chess grandmaster and former world chess champion
- Vladimir Akopian, chess player
- Ashot Nadanian, chess player
- Vladimir Bagirov, chess player
- Yevgeny Petrosyan, comedian
- Sergey Gazarov, actor
- Georgy Shakhnazarov, political scientist
- Rafael Kaprelyan, test pilot, Hero of the Soviet Union
- Avet Terterian, composer
- Sergey Petrosyan, weightlifter
- Karina Aznavourian, épée fencer
- Karapet Karapetyan, kickboxer
- Yura Movsisyan, football player

== See also ==
- Armenian diaspora
- Anti-Armenian sentiment in Azerbaijan
- Armenian Cultural Heritage in Azerbaijan
- List of Azerbaijani Armenians
- Armenian–Azerbaijani War
- Armenian National Council of Baku
- Armenia–Azerbaijan relations
- Armenians in Baku
- Azerbaijanis in Armenia
- Armenians in Shamakhi
