= Azerbaijanis in Armenia =

Ethnic group

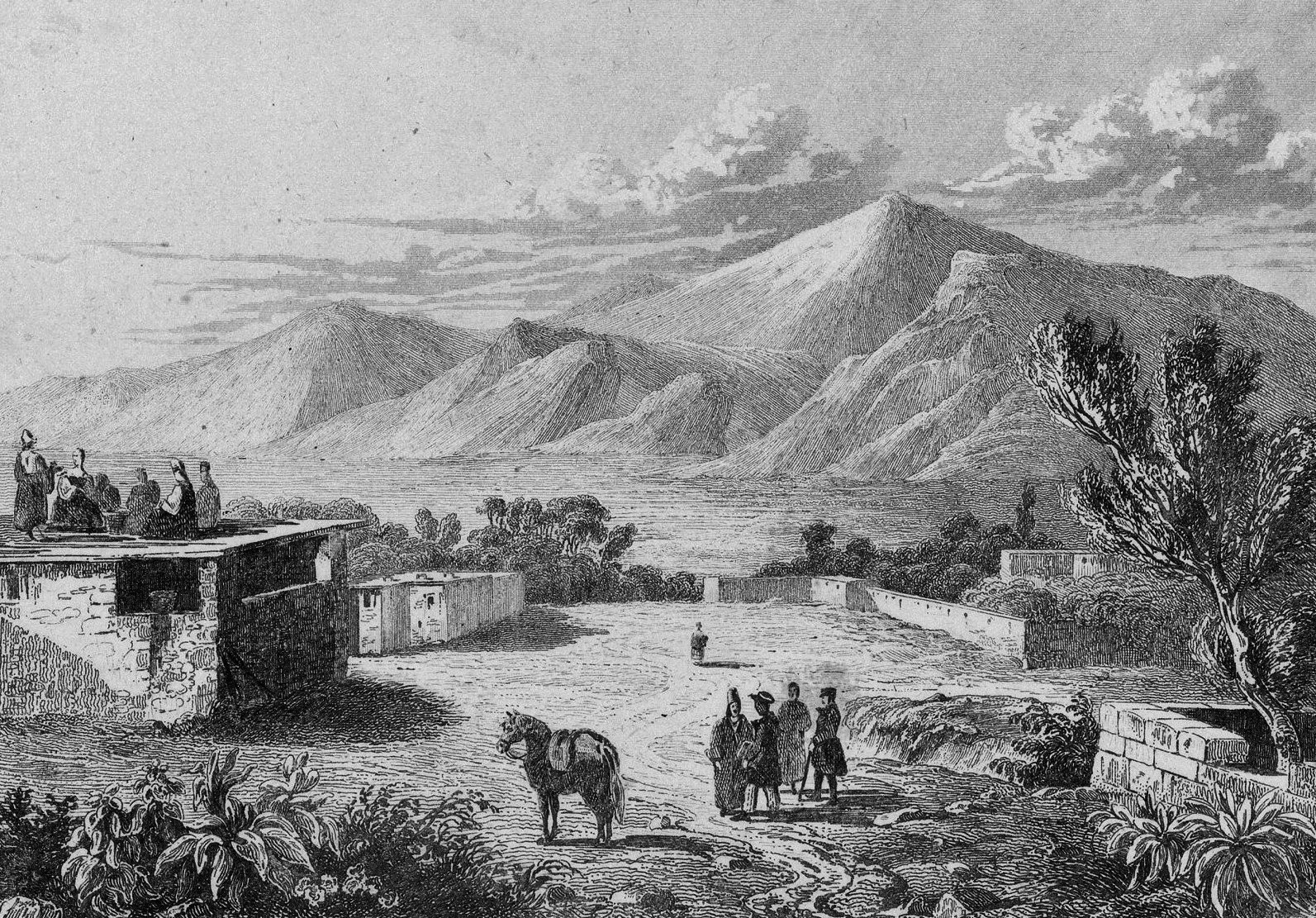
- View of Mount Ararat from a nearby Tatar (Note: The term "Tatars", employed by the Russians, referred to Turkish-speaking Muslims (Shia and Sunni) of Transcaucasia. Unlike Armenians and Georgians, the Tatars did not have their own alphabet and used the Perso-Arabic script. After 1918 with the establishment of the Azerbaijan Democratic Republic, and "especially during the Soviet era", the Tatar group identified itself as "Azerbaijani". Prior to 1918 the word "Azerbaijan" exclusively referred to the Iranian province of Azarbayjan.) village, 1838

Total population
- 29 (2001)

Languages
- Azerbaijani

Religion
- Islam (mostly Shia)

Azerbaijanis in Armenia (Azerbaijani: Ermənistan azərbaycanlıları or Qərbi azərbaycanlılar, lit. 'Western Azerbaijanis') numbered 29 people according to the 2001 census of Armenia. Although they have previously been the biggest minority in the country according to 1831 (Note: Although not mentioned as "Azerbaijanis" (an ethnonym coined in 1918), censuses in 1831 and 1897 describe Muslims to be the largest minority and Armenian Apostolics the majority in the country; censuses in 1873 and 1886 suggest that most of these Muslims were Tatars (the Russian Empire's designation of Turkic speaking Muslims). The Tatars living in the southeastern Caucasus "became identified as Azeris".)–1989 censuses, they are virtually non-existent since 1988–1991 when most fled or were forced out of the country as a result of the tensions of the First Nagorno-Karabakh War to neighboring Azerbaijan. The UNHCR estimates that the current population of Azerbaijanis in Armenia to be somewhere between 30 and a few hundred people, with most of them living in rural areas as members of mixed couples (mostly mixed marriages), as well as elderly or sick. Most of them are reported to have changed their names to maintain a low profile to avoid discrimination.

== Historical statistics ==
Tatars (later known as Azerbaijanis) constituted the largest minority in Armenia since 1831 at least, the year of the first available census in the territory of Armenia (shortly after Russia's annexation by virtue of the Treaty of Turkmenchay. In 1831, Muslims were 50,274 or 31.1%; in 1873, Tatars were 132,125 or 26.7%; in 1886, Tatars were 160,963 or 25.3%; in 1897, Muslims were 240,323 or 30.1%; in 1922, Turkish-Tatars were 77,767 or 9.9%; in 1926, Turks were 77,655 or 8.8%; in 1931, Turks were 105,838 or 10.1%; in 1939, Azerbaijanis were 130,896 or 10.2%; in 1959, Azerbaijanis were 107,748 or 6.1%; in 1970, Azerbaijanis were 148,189 or 5.9%; in 1979, Azerbaijanis were 160,841 or 5.3%; in 1989, Azerbaijanis were 84,860 or 2.6%; in 2001, Azerbaijanis were 29 or 0.001% of the population on the territory of modern-day Armenia. Journalist Thomas de Waal estimates that there were approximately 200,000 Azerbaijanis in Armenia in the mid-1980s.

== History ==
=== Pre-Russian rule ===
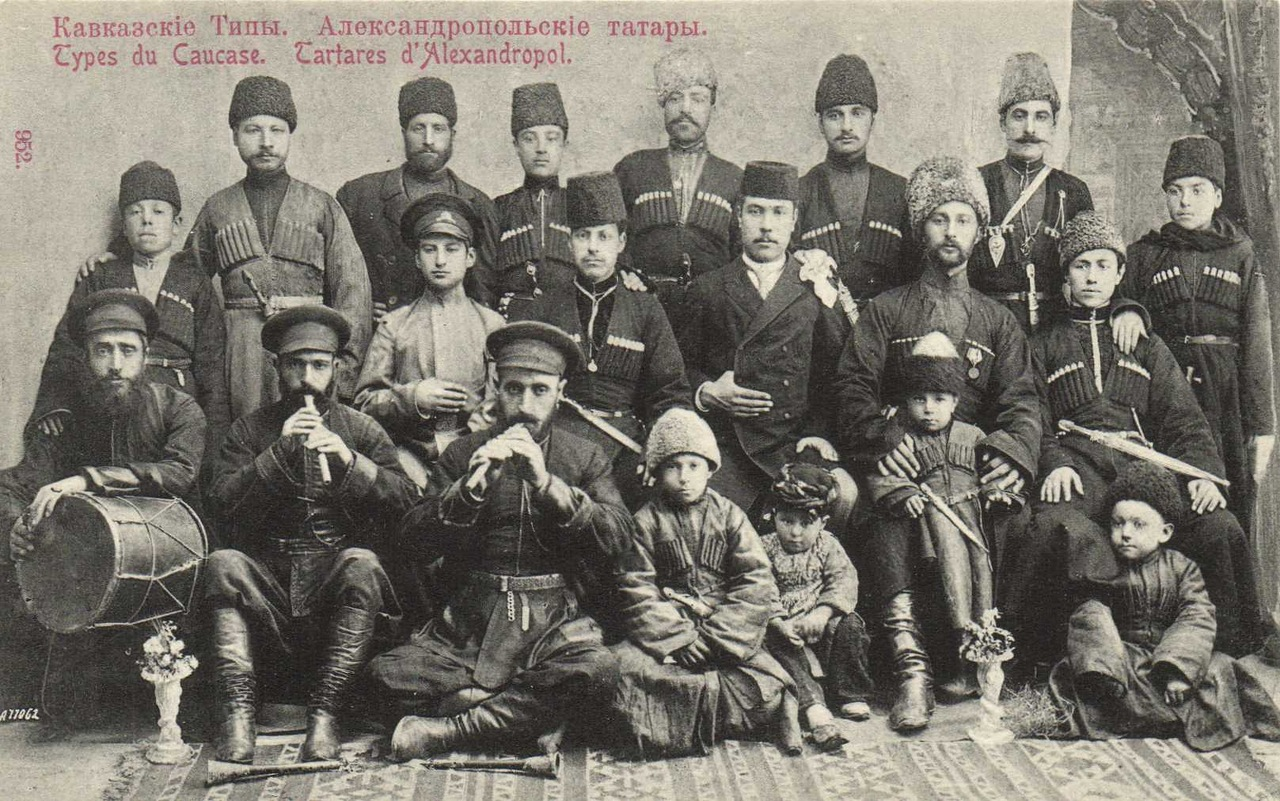
Tatars (i.e. Azerbaijani people) from Alexandropol. Postcard of the Russian Empire

Upon Seljuk conquests in the eleventh century, the mass of the Oghuz Turkic tribes crossed the Amu Darya towards the west left the Iranian plateau, which remained Persian, and established themselves further west, in Armenia, the Caucasus, and Anatolia. Here they divided into the Ottomans, who were Sunni and created settlements, and the Turcomans, who were nomads and in part Shiite (or, rather, Alevi), gradually becoming sedentary and assimilating with the local population.

Until the mid-fourteenth century, Armenians had constituted a majority in Eastern Armenia. At the close of the fourteenth century, after Timur's campaigns of the extermination of the local population, Islam had become the dominant faith, and Armenians became a minority in Eastern Armenia. After centuries of constant warfare on the Armenian Plateau, many Armenians chose to emigrate and settle elsewhere. Following Shah Abbas I's massive relocation of Armenians and Muslims in 1604–05, their numbers dwindled even further.

Some 80% of the population of Iranian Armenia were Muslims (Persians, Turkics, and Kurds) whereas Christian Armenians constituted a minority of about 20%. As a result of the Treaty of Gulistan (1813) and the Treaty of Turkmenchay (1828), Iran was forced to cede Iranian Armenia (which also constituted the present-day Armenia), to the Russians.

=== Russian rule ===
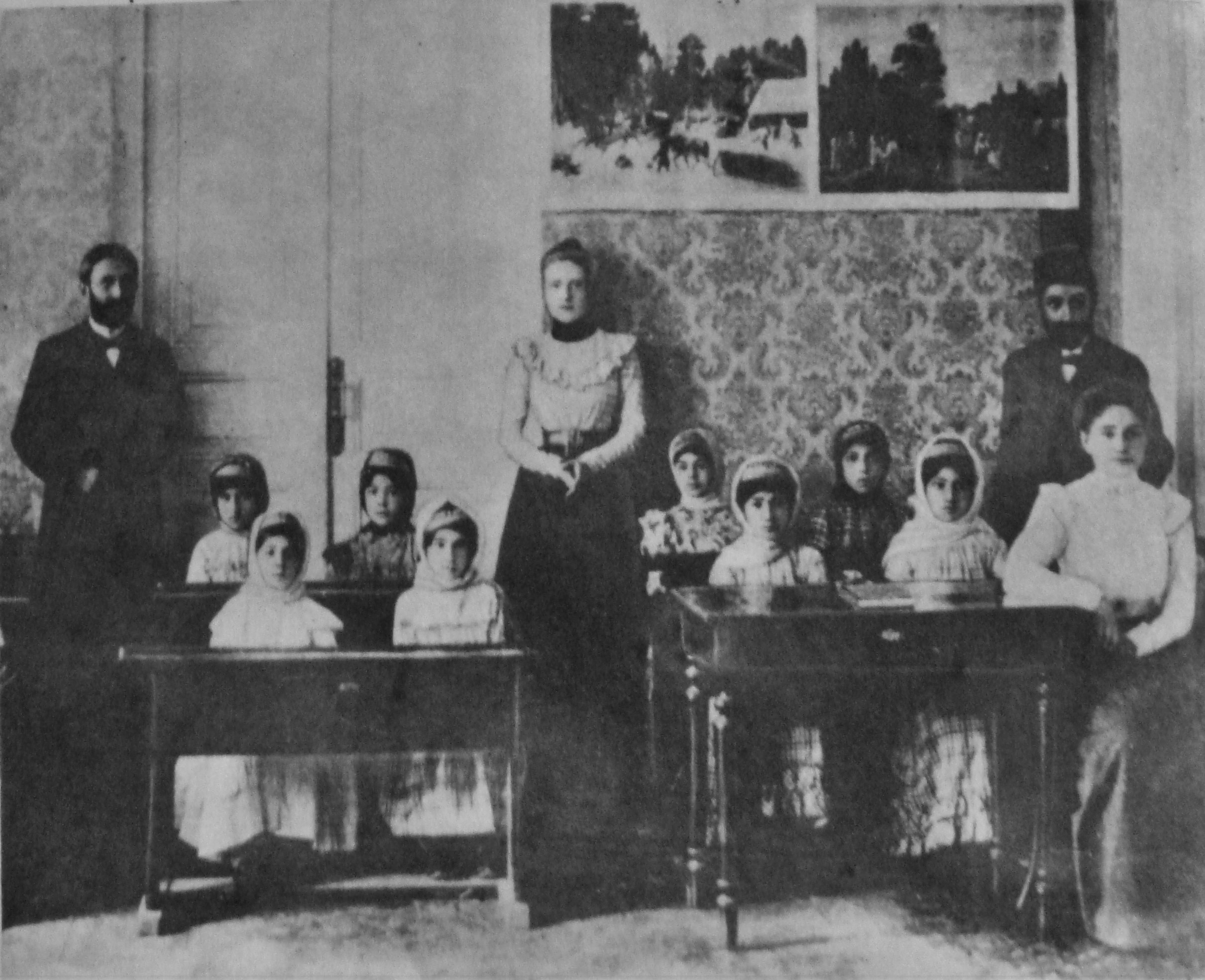
Staff, and students of the Erivan Russian-Muslim School for Girls (1902)

After the Russian administration took hold of Iranian Armenia, the ethnic make-up shifted, and thus for the first time in more than four centuries, ethnic Armenians started to form a majority once again in one part of historic Armenia. The new Russian administration encouraged the settling of ethnic Armenians from Iran proper and Ottoman Turkey. As a result, by 1832, the number of ethnic Armenians had matched that of the Muslims. Anyhow, it would be only after the Crimean War and the Russo-Turkish War of 1877–1878, which brought another influx of Turkish Armenians, that ethnic Armenians once again established a solid majority in Eastern Armenia. Nevertheless, the city of Erivan (present-day Yerevan) remained having a Muslim majority up to the twentieth century.

The term "Tatars", employed by the Russians, referred to Turkish-speaking Muslims (Shia and Sunni) of Transcaucasia. Unlike Armenians and Georgians, the Tatars did not have their own alphabet and used the Perso-Arabic script. After 1918 with the establishment of the Azerbaijan Democratic Republic, and "especially during the Soviet era", the Tatar group identified itself as "Azerbaijani". Prior to 1918 the word "Azerbaijan" exclusively referred to the Iranian province of Azarbayjan.

According to the traveler H. F. B. Lynch, the city of Erivan was about 50% Armenian and 50% Muslim (Tatars i.e. Azerbaijanis and Persians) in the early 1890s. H. F. B. Lynch thought that some among the Muslims were Persians when he visited the city within the same decade, and modern historians George Bournoutian and Robert H. Hewsen thought many were Persian. According to the Brockhaus and Efron Encyclopedic Dictionary, by the beginning of the twentieth century a significant population of Aderbeijanskie Tatars (i.e. Azerbaijanis) still lived in Russian Armenia. They numbered about 300,000 persons or 37.5% in Russia's Erivan Governorate, roughly corresponding to most of present-day central Armenia.

Most lived in rural areas and were engaged in farming and carpet-weaving. They formed the majority in four of the governorate's seven districts, including the city of Erivan itself, where they constituted 49% of the population (compared to 48% constituted by Armenians). Azerbaijanis also constituted a substantial minority in what later became the regions of Sisian, Kafan and Meghri in the Armenian SSR (present-day Syunik Province, Armenia, at the time part of the Elisabethpol Governorate). Traditionally, Azerbaijanis in Armenia were almost entirely Shia Muslim, with the exception of the Talin region, as well as small pockets in Shorayal and around Vedi where they mainly adhered to Sunni Islam. Traveller Luigi Villari reported in 1905 that in Erivan the Tatars (later known as Azerbaijanis) were generally wealthier than the Armenians, and owned nearly all of the land.

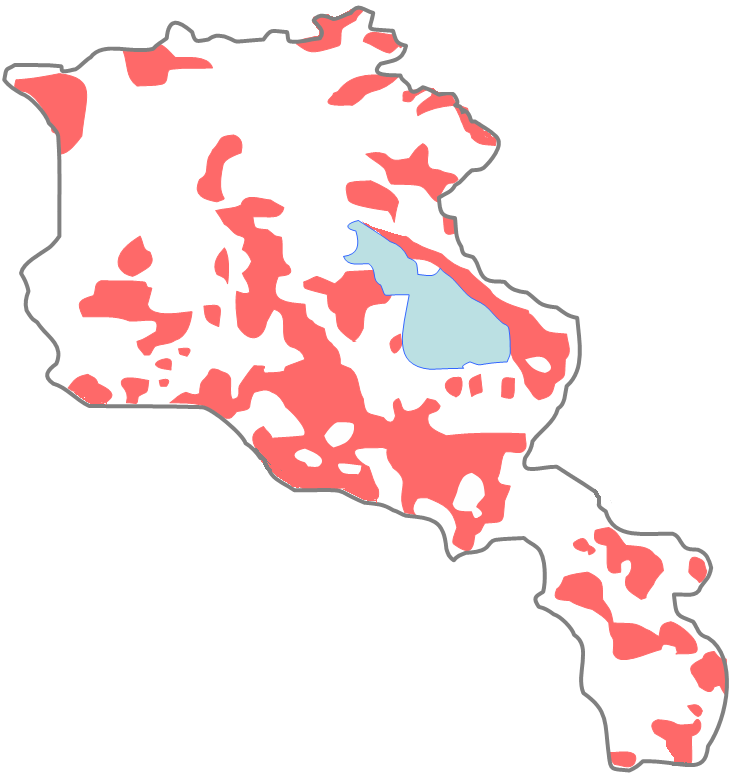
Distribution of Azerbaijanis in modern borders of Armenia, 1886–1890.

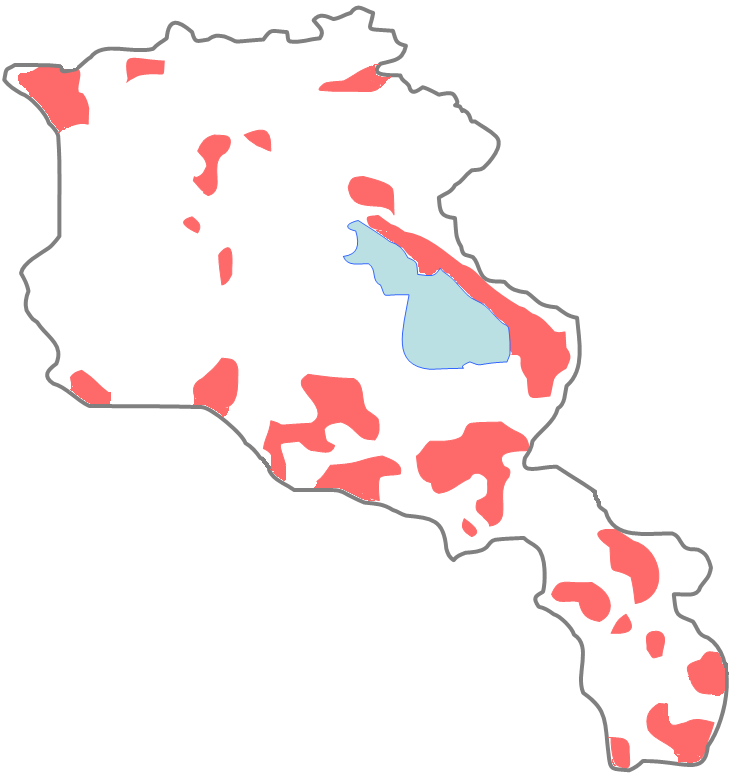
Distribution of Azerbaijanis in the Armenian SSR, 1926.

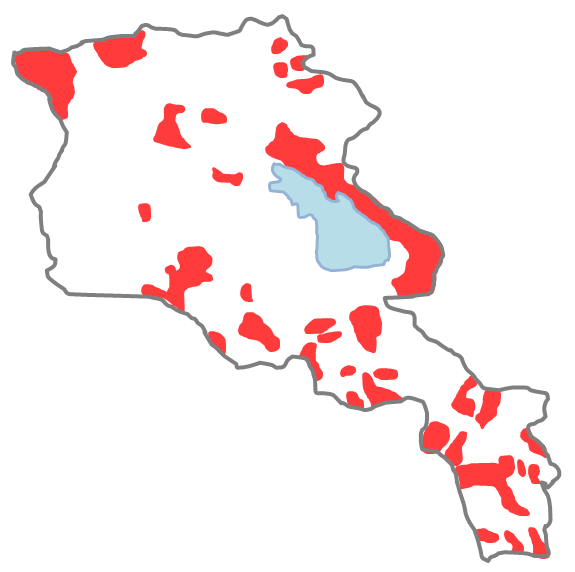
Distribution of Azerbaijanis in the Armenian SSR, 1962.

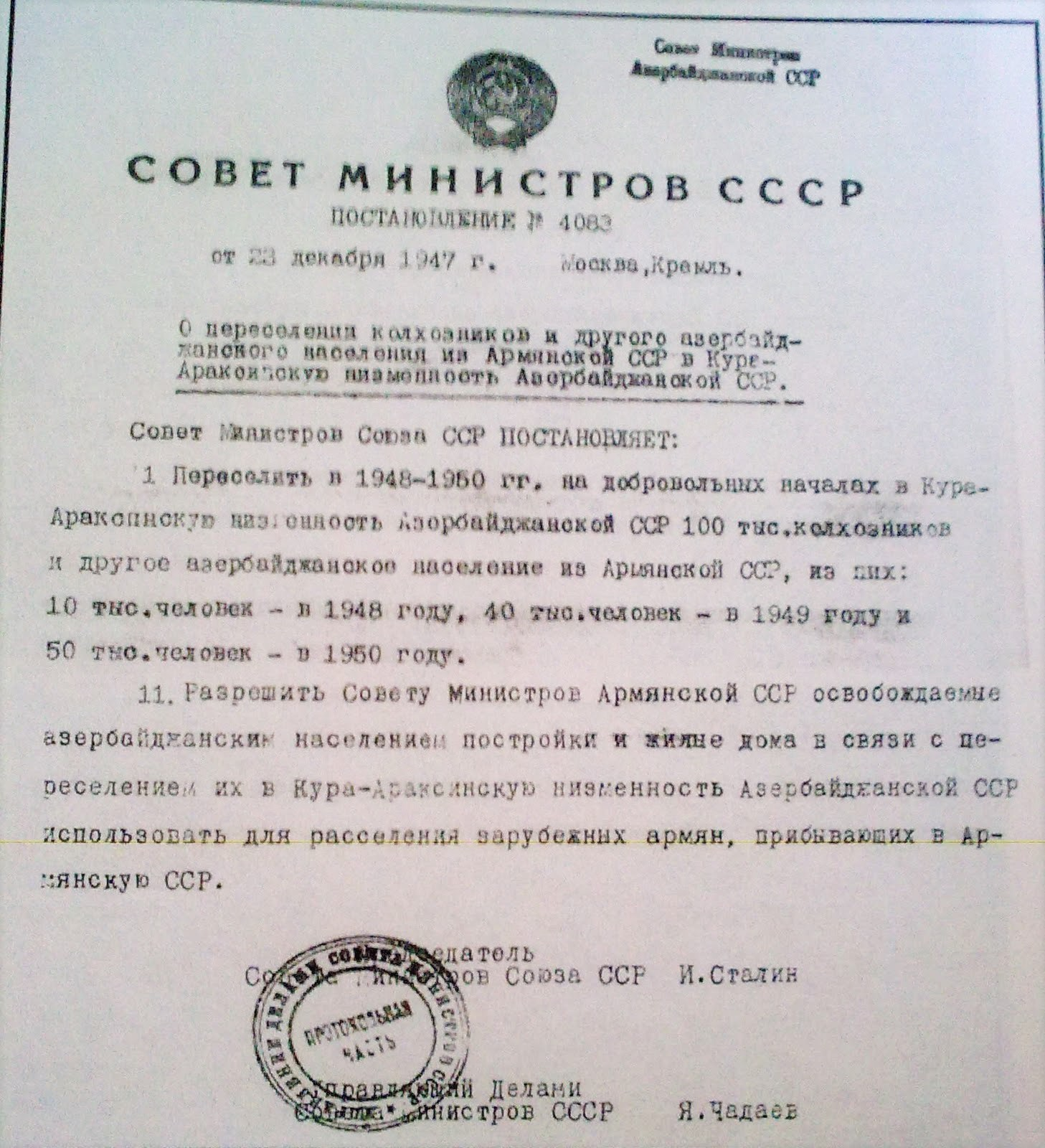
Stalin signed a decree ordering the deportation of Azerbaijanis from Armenian SSR and replacement of foreign Armenians in their houses on December 23, 1947

For Azerbaijanis of Armenia, the twentieth century was the period of marginalization, discrimination, mass and often forcible migrations resulting in significant changes in the country's ethnic composition, even though they had managed to stay its largest ethnic minority until the Nagorno-Karabakh conflict. In 1905–1907, the Erivan Governorate became an arena of clashes between Armenians and Azerbaijanis believed to have been instigated by the Russian government in order to draw public attention away from the Russian Revolution of 1905.

=== First Republic of Armenia ===
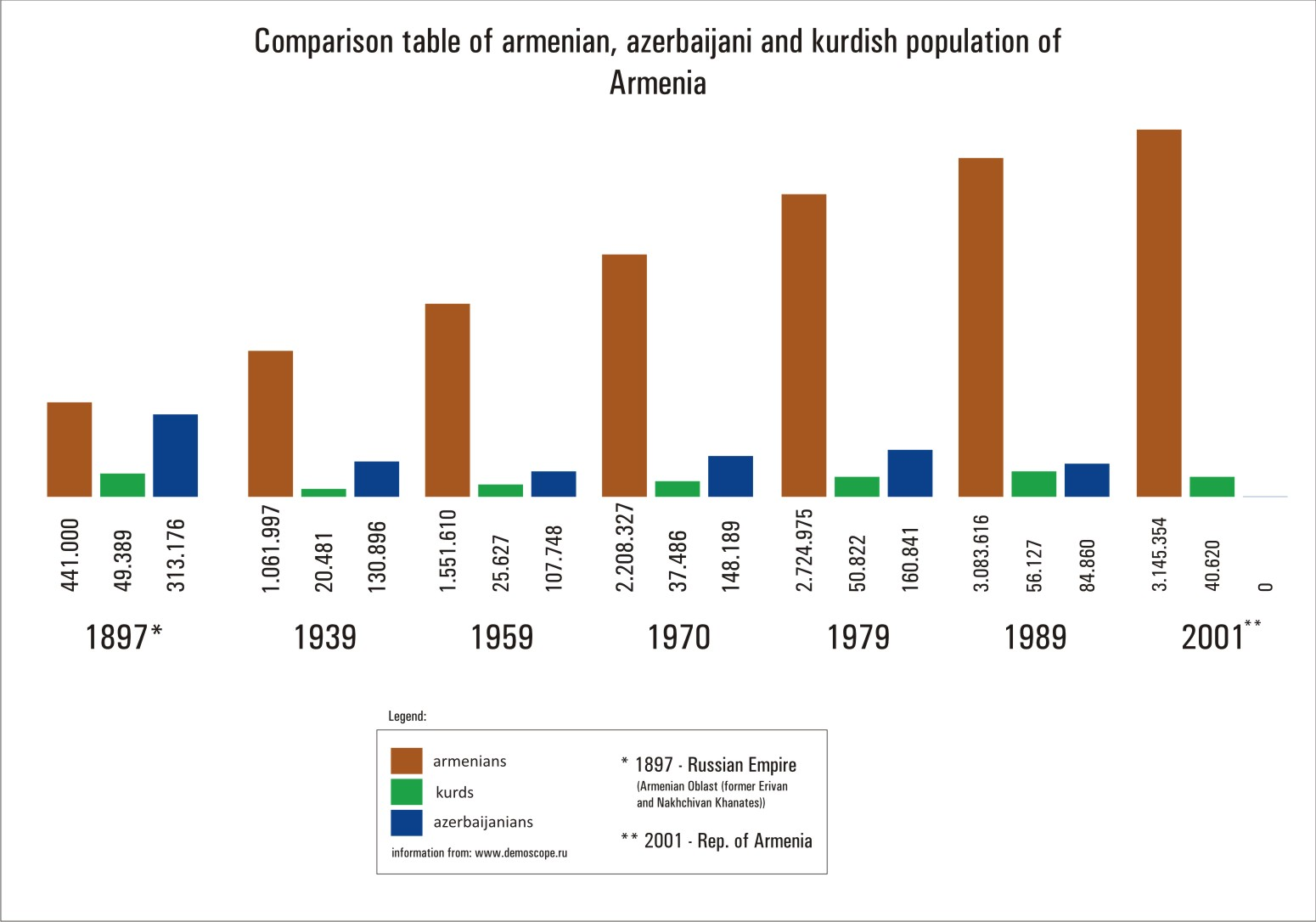
Comparison table of Armenian, Azerbaijani (blue) and Kurdish population of Armenia

Tensions rose again after both Armenia and Azerbaijan became briefly independent from the Russian Empire in 1918. Both quarrelled over where their common borders lay. Warfare coupled with the influx of Armenian refugees resulted in widespread massacres of Muslims in Armenia causing virtually all of them to flee to Azerbaijan. German historian Jörg Baberowski writes that until March 1918, 100,000 Muslims throughout Armenia, mainly Daralayaz (modern-day Vayots Dzor) and Nor Bayazet (modern-day Gegharkunik), escaped to Ottoman-controlled territory or were killed, and 199 of their villages were destroyed by withdrawing Cossacks and Armenian volunteers. Nearly a third of the 350,000 Muslims of the Erivan Governorate were displaced from their villages in 1918–1919 and living in the outskirts of Yerevan or along the former Russo-Turkish border in emptied Armenian homes. In 1919, the Armenian government declared the right of return of all refugees, however, this was not implemented in emptied Muslim settlements occupied by Western Armenian refugees.

Andranik Ozanian and Rouben Ter Minassian were particularly prominent in the destruction of Muslim settlements and in the planned ethnic homogenisation of regions with once mixed population through populating them with Armenian refugees from Turkey, such regions included Erivan and Daralayaz. Ter Minassian, displeased with the fact that Azerbaijanis in Armenia lived on fertile lands, waged at least three campaigns aimed at cleansing Azerbaijanis from 20 villages outside Erivan, as well as in the south of the country. According to French historian (and Ter Minassian's daughter-in-law) Anahide Ter Minassian, to achieve his goals, he used intimidation and negotiations, but above all, "fire and steel" and "the most violent methods to 'encourage' Muslims in Armenia" to leave. The destruction of Muslim settlements in Zangezur and the restriction on Muslim shepherds taking their flock into Zangezur served as the casus belli for Azerbaijan's unsuccessful assault on Zangezur in November 1919. During the existence of the 1921 anti-Soviet revolt known as the Republic of Mountainous Armenia, Nzhdeh expelled the remainder of the Azerbaijani population from Zangezur thus achieving a "re-Armenianization" of the region.

On 8 April 1920, Lord Curzon at the Paris Peace Conference warned the Armenian delegation that the actions of the "three chiefs", Dro, Hamazasp and Gyulkhandanyan, in destroying Tatar villages and staging massacres in Zangezur, Surmalu, Etchmiadzin, and Zangibasar was doing "great harm" to their cause—he also referred to an "official Tartar communique" from Wardrop attesting to the destruction of 300 villages. Curzon also spoke of the massacres of 4,000 Tatars, including women and children, near the Armenian–Turkish border, and the expulsion of 36,000 by cannon shots. The newspaper Le Temps also wrote that "several dozens of thousands Muslims had been killed in Armenia during the months of June and July 1920". In October 1919, Muslim authorities in Kars appealed to Azerbaijan for means to transport 25,000 refugees to them. Azerbaijan through the Armenian diplomatic representative in Baku transferred funds to assist the destitute 70,000–80,000 Muslim refugees living south of Yerevan—50,000 of this number were dependent on relief aid during the winter. It was later reported through Azerbaijani representatives that there were 13,000 Muslims in Yerevan and another 50,000 throughout Armenia. Conversely, in northern Armenia, Muslims lived "acceptably" with "generally cordial" interethnic relations. The 40,000 Muslims who had fled from Armenia to Azerbaijan were resettled through a 69 million ruble allocation by the Azerbaijani government.

Though Azerbaijanis were represented by three delegates in an 80-seat Armenian parliament (much more modestly than Armenians in the Azerbaijani parliament), they were universally targeted as "Turkish fifth columnists". In his June 1919 report, Anastas Mikoyan stated that "the organised extermination of the Muslim population in Armenia threatened to result in Azerbaijan declaring a war [against Armenia] any minute". According to data from Caucasian Ethnographical Collection of Academy of Sciences of the USSR, "the settlements of Azerbaijani population in Armenia had become empty." Nataliya Volkova writes that the ruling party of Armenia, the Dashnaktsutyun, followed a policy of "cleansing the country from outsiders" which "targeted the Muslim population", especially those who had been driven out from Nor Bayazet, Erivan, Etchmiadzin and Sharur-Daralayaz uezds. A Soviet Armenian source writes that at least 200,000 Turks and Kurds were driven from Armenia in 1919 as a result of the ARF government. Moreover, the author adds that by the time of the Sovietization of Armenia in 1920, some 10,000 Turks remained within Armenia. Another Soviet Armenian historian, Bagrat Boryan, charged that the ARF had not established state authority for the administrative needs of Armenia, but for the "extermination of the Muslim population and looting of their property". However, Turkish-German historian Taner Akçam posits that the massacres against the Muslim population of Armenia are exaggerated or even outright fabrications in order to "reinforce the image of the 'Armenian peril.'"

=== Soviet rule ===
The Soviet Armenian government facilitated the repatriation of some 60,000 refugees bringing the total of Azerbaijanis in Armenia up to 72,596 by 1922, forming 9.9% of the population; this number according to the 1926 All-Soviet population census grew to 84,705 whereby the Azerbaijani share of the population declined slightly to 9.6%. By 1939, their numbers had increased to 131,896 or 10.3% of the population.

In 1947, Grigory Arutinov, then First Secretary of the Communist Party of Armenia, managed to persuade the Council of Ministers of the USSR to issue a decree entitled Planned measures for the resettlement of collective farm workers and other Azerbaijanis from the Armenian SSR to the Kura-Arax lowlands of the Azerbaijani SSR. According to the decree, between 1948 and 1951, the Azerbaijani community in Armenia became partly subject to a "voluntary resettlement" (called by some sources a deportation) to central Azerbaijan to make way for Armenian immigrants from the Armenian diaspora. In those four years some 100,000 Azerbaijanis were deported from Armenia. This reduced the number of those in Armenia down to 107,748 in 1959. By 1979, Azerbaijanis numbered 160,841 and constituted 5.3% of Armenia's population. The Azerbaijani population of Yerevan, that once formed the majority, dropped to 0.7% by 1959 and further to 0.1% by 1989.

Soviet education policy ensured the availability of schools with Azerbaijani as the language of instruction in Armenia. In 1979, among the 160,841 Azers living in Armenia, Armenian was spoken as a second language by 16,164 (10%) and Russian by 15,879 (9.9%) (compared to Armenians in Azerbaijan, of whom 8% knew Azerbaijani and 43% knew Russian).

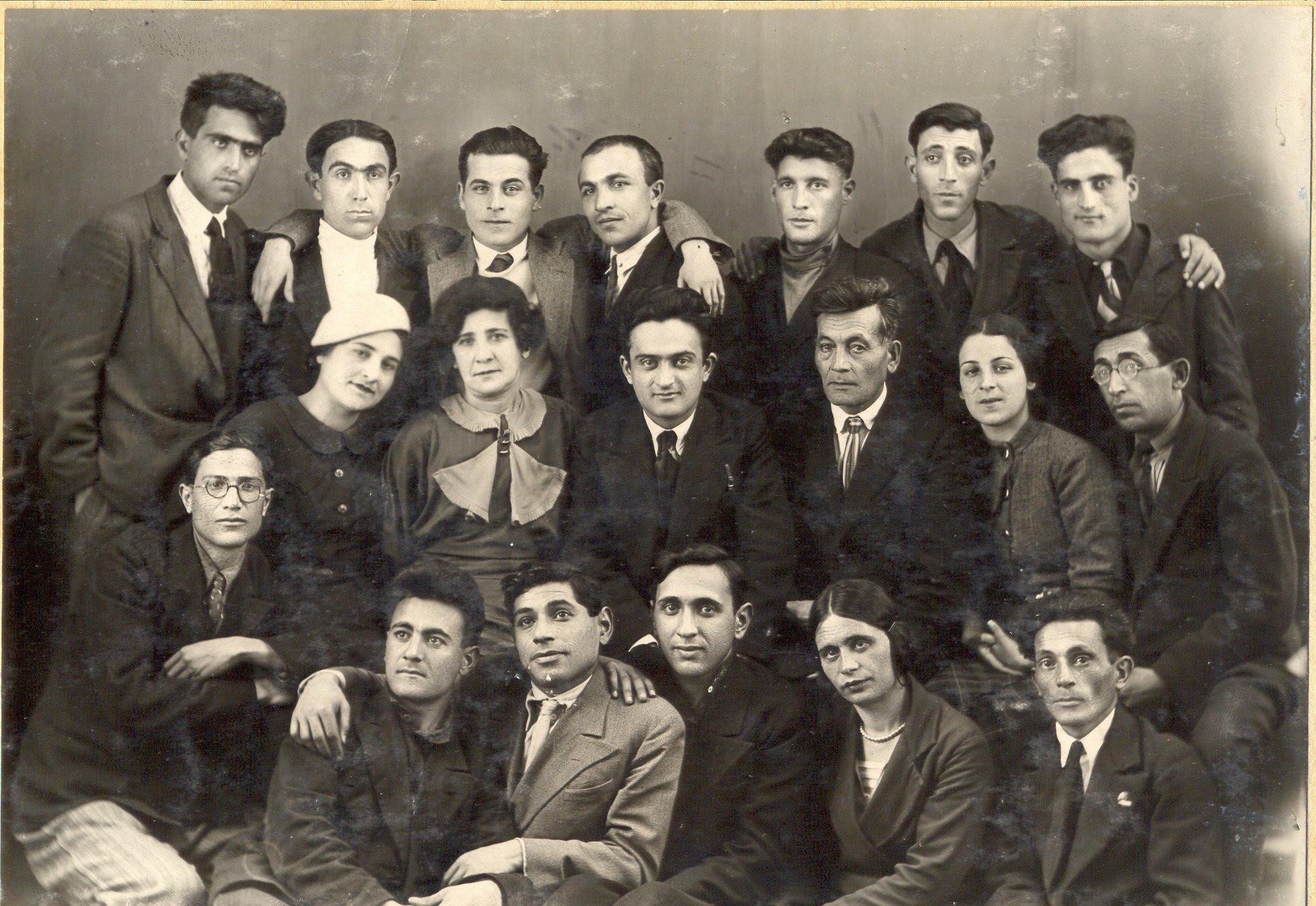
Performing troupe of the Yerevan state Azerbaijan dramatic theater in 1937

In 1934–1944, prior to rising to fame in Azerbaijan, prominent singer Rashid Behbudov was a soloist of the Yerevan Philharmonic and of the Armenian State Jazz Orchestra. Around the same time, he performed at the Armenian National Academic Theater of Opera and Ballet. Theatre and film critic Sabir Rzayev, an ethnic Azerbaijani native of Yerevan, was the founder of Armenian film studies and the author of the first and only film-related monograph in Soviet Armenia.

=== Nagorno-Karabakh conflict ===
When the Nagorno-Karabakh conflict broke out, as the order of the Soviet Union was falling apart, Armenia had a large population of Azerbaijani minorities. Civil unrest in Nagorno-Karabakh in 1987 led to harassment of Azerbaijanis, some of whom were forced to leave Armenia. What started off as peaceful demonstrations in support of the Nagorno-Karabakh Armenians, in the absence of a favourable solution, soon turned into a nationalist movement, manifesting in violence in Azerbaijan, Armenian, and Karabakh against the minority population.

On 25 January 1988 the first wave of Azerbaijani refugees from Armenia settled in the city of Sumgait. On 23 March, the presidium of the Supreme Soviet of the Soviet Union – that is the highest institution in the Union – rejected the demands of the Nagorno-Karabakh Council of People's Deputies to join Armenia without any possibility of appeal. Troops were deployed in Yerevan to prevent protests to the decision. In the following months, Azerbaijanis in Armenia were subject to further harassment and forced to flee. In the district of Ararat, four villages were burned on 25 March. On 11 May, intimidation by violence forced many Azerbaijanis to migrate in Azerbaijan from Ararat in large numbers. On 7 June, Azerbaijanis were evicted from the town of Masis near the Armenian–Turkish border, and on the 20 June of the same month five more Azerbaijani villages were cleansed in the Ararat region. Another major wave occurred in November 1988 as Azerbaijanis were either expelled by the nationalists and local or state authorities, or fled fearing for their lives. Many died in the process, either due to isolated Armenian attacks or adverse conditions. Due to violence that flared up in November 1988, 25 Azerbaijanis were killed, according to Armenian sources (of those 20 during Gugark pogrom); and 217 (including those who died of extreme weather conditions while fleeing), according to Azerbaijani sources.

In 1988–91, the remaining Azerbaijanis were forced to flee primarily to Azerbaijan. It is impossible to determine the exact population numbers for Azerbaijanis in Armenia at the time of the conflict's escalation since during the 1989 census, forced Azerbaijani migration from Armenia was already in progress. UNHCR's estimate is 200,000 persons.

== Current situation ==
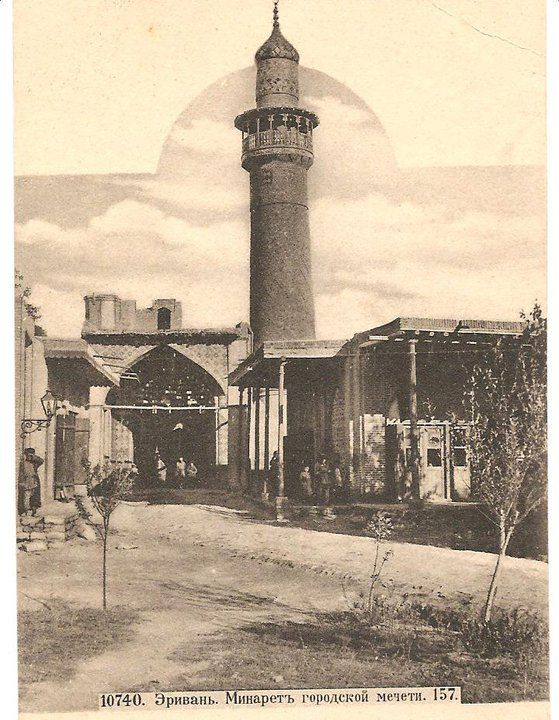
Minaret of the Urban Mosque in Erivan

According to journalist Thomas de Waal, a few residents of Vardanants Street recall a small mosque being demolished in 1990. Geographical names of Turkic origin were changed en masse into Armenian-sounding ones (in addition to those continuously changed from the 1930s on), a measure seen by some as a method to erase from popular memory the fact that Muslims had once formed a substantial portion of the local population. According to Husik Ghulyan's study, in the period 2006-2018, more than 7700 Turkic geographic names that existed in the country have been changed and replaced by Armenian names. Those Turkic names were mostly located in areas that previously were heavily populated by Azerbaijanis, namely in Gegharkunik, Kotayk and Vayots Dzor regions and some parts of Syunik and Ararat regions.

In 2001, historian Suren Hobosyan of the Armenian Institute of Archeology and Ethnography estimated that there were 300 to 500 people of Azerbaijani origin living in Armenia, mostly descendants of mixed marriages, with only 60 to 100 being of full Azerbaijani ancestry. In an anonymous case study of 15 people of Azerbaijani origin (13 of mixed Armenian–Azerbaijani and 2 of full Azerbaijani ancestry) carried out in 2001 by the International Organization for Migration with the help of the non-governmental Armenian Sociological Association in Yerevan, Meghri, Sotk and Avazan, 12 respondents said they concealed their Azerbaijani roots from the public, and only 3 said they identified as Azerbaijani. 13 out of 15 respondents reported being Christian and none reported being Muslim.

Some Azerbaijanis continue to live in Armenia to this day. Official statistics suggest there are 29 Azerbaijanis in Armenia as of 2001. Hranush Kharatyan, the then head of the Department on National Minorities and Religion Matters of Armenia, stated in February 2007:

Yes, ethnic Azerbaijanis are living in Armenia. I know many of them but I cannot give numbers. Armenia has signed a UN convention according to which the states take an obligation not to publish statistical data related to groups under threat or who consider themselves to be under threat if these groups are not numerous and might face problems. During the census, a number of people described their ethnicity as Azerbaijani. I know some Azerbaijanis who came here with their wives or husbands. Some prefer not to speak out about their ethnic affiliation; others take it more easily. We spoke with some known Azerbaijanis residing in Armenia but they have not manifested a will to form an ethnic community yet.

== Prominent Azerbaijanis from Armenia ==
- Ashig Alasgar, 19th-century Azerbaijani poet and folk singer
- Mirza Gadim Iravani, Azerbaijani painter of the mid-19th century
- Mammad agha Shahtakhtinski, Azerbaijani linguist and Member of the State Duma
- Akbar agha Sheykhulislamov, Minister of Agriculture of Azerbaijan in 1918–1920
- Abbasgulu bey Shadlinski, Soviet Azerbaijani military leader
- Heydar Huseynov, Azerbaijani philosopher
- Aziz Aliyev, Soviet politician
- Said Rustamov, Azerbaijani composer and conductor
- Mustafa Topchubashov, prominent Soviet surgeon and academician
- Ali Insanov, former Minister of Healthcare of Azerbaijan
- Huseyn Seyidzadeh, Azerbaijani film director
- Ahliman Amiraslanov, Azerbaijani physician
- Ismat Abbasov, Minister of Agriculture of Azerbaijan
- Avaz Alakbarov, Azerbaijani economist, ex-Minister of Finance of Azerbaijan
- Khagani Mammadov, Azerbaijani football player
- Khalaf Khalafov, Deputy Minister of the Foreign Affairs Ministry
- Ramazan Abbasov, Azerbaijani football player
- Rovshan Huseynov, Azerbaijani boxer
- Ismail Feyzullabeyli, Azerbaijani scholar
- Shahin Mustafayev, Minister of Economic Development of Azerbaijan
- Ogtay Asadov, Speaker of the National Assembly of Azerbaijan
- Mir Yusif Mirbabayev, linguistics scholar, director of the Institute of Linguistics at the Academy of Sciences of the Azerbaijan SSR. He was one of the authors and the scientific editor of the 4-volume Russian-Azerbaijani dictionary, and a recipient of the Stalin Prize in 1948.
- Hidayat Orujov, Azerbaijani writer and ambassador to Kyrgyzstan
- Garib Mammadov, Chairman of State Land and Cartography Committee of Azerbaijan Republic.
- Zulfi Hajiyev, Deputy Prime Minister of Azerbaijan, Member of Azerbaijani Parliament
- Yusif Yusifov, a prominent Azerbaijani historian, orientalist, linguist, specialist on ancient literature.
- Kerim Allahverdiyev, a Doctor of Physical and Mathematical Sciences (1981), a professor, and a full member of the European Academy of Sciences.

== See also ==
- Armenia–Azerbaijan relations
- Yeraz
- Western Azerbaijan (irredentist concept)
- Islam in Armenia
- Anti-Azerbaijani sentiment in Armenia
- Blue Mosque, Yerevan
- Demographics of Armenia
- Armenians in Azerbaijan

== Bibliography ==
- Baberovski, Yorg (2010). Враг есть везде. Сталинизм на Кавказе [The enemy is everywhere. Stalinism in the Caucasus] (in Russian). Moscow: Rossiyskaya politicheskaya entsiklopediya (ROSSPEN) Fond «Prezidentskiy tsentr B. N. Yeltsina». ISBN 978-5-8243-1435-9. Archived from the original on 8 October 2022.
- Bloxham, Donald (2005). The Great Game of Genocide: Imperialism, Nationalism, and the Destruction of the Ottoman Armenians. Oxford: Oxford University Press. ISBN 0-19-927356-1. OCLC 57483924.
- Bournoutian, George A. (1980). "The Population of Persian Armenia Prior to and Immediately Following its Annexation to the Russian Empire: 1826–1832". The Wilson Center, Kennan Institute for Advanced Russian Studies.
- Hovannisian, Richard G. (1971). The Republic of Armenia. Vol. 1. Berkeley: University of California Press. ISBN 0-520-01805-2.
- Hovannisian, Richard G. (1982). The Republic of Armenia. Vol. 2. Berkeley: University of California Press. ISBN 0-520-04186-0.
- Kettenhofen, Erich; Bournoutian, George A.; Hewsen, Robert H. (1998). "EREVAN". Encyclopaedia Iranica, Vol. VIII, Fasc. 5. pp. 542–551.
- Korkotyan, Zaven (1932). Խորհրդային Հայաստանի բնակչությունը վերջին հարյուրամյակում (1831-1931) [The population of Soviet Armenia in the last century (1831–1931)] (PDF) (in Armenian). Yerevan: Pethrat. p. 184. Archived from the original (PDF) on 2 February 2022.
- Mikaberidze, Alexander (2015). Historical Dictionary of Georgia (2 ed.). Rowman & Littlefield. ISBN 978-1442241466.
