= Mirbabayev =

Mirbabayev

- Mir Yusif Mirbabayev - Azerbaijani linguistics scholar, director of the Institute of Linguistics at the Academy of Sciences of the Azerbaijan SSR
- Seyid Mirbabayev - Azerbaijani singer, khanende, and oil industrialist of the late 19th and early 20th centuries
