= Balakend, Azerbaijan =

Balakend, Azerbaijan may refer to:

- Balakend, Gadabay
- Balakend, Saatly
