= List of Azerbaijani Armenians =

This is a list of notable Azerbaijani Armenians.

Azerbaijani Armenians are people born, raised, or who reside in Azerbaijan, with origins in the area known as Armenian, which ranges from the Caucasian mountain range to the Anatolian plateau.

To be included in this list, the person must have a Wikipedia article showing they are Azerbaijani Armenian or must have references showing they are Azerbaijani Armenian and are notable.

== List ==
=== Actors ===
- Hovhannes Abelian - actor
- Anatoliy Eiramdzhan - film director, producer, and writer
- Anna Melikian - film director
- Armen Ohanian - Armenian dancer, actress, writer and translator

=== Architects ===
- Boris Babaian - pioneering creator of supercomputers in the Soviet Union
- Karo Halabyan - architect

=== Business ===
- Yevgeny Petrosyan - comedian

=== Military ===
- Bekor Ashot
- Hovhannes Bagramyan - Army Commander, Marshal of the Soviet Union
- Hamazasp Babadzhanian - Soviet Chief marshal of the armored troops
- Rafael Ivanovich Kapreliants - Hero of the Soviet Union

=== Music ===
- Albert Asriyan - composer
- Artemi Ayvazyan - composer
- Alexey Ekimyan - composer and police general
- Andrey Kasparov - pianist, composer and professor
- Alexander Mirzayan - composer
- Avet Terterian - composer

=== Politicians ===
- Georgy Shakhnazarov - political scientist

=== Science ===
- Hovannes Adamian - one of the inventors of color television
- Abraham Alikhanov - physicist and academic

=== Sports ===
- Vladimir Akopian - chess player
- Arkady Andreasyan - football player
- Rudolf Atamalyan - football player
- Karina Aznavourian - épée fencer
- Vladimir Bagirov - chess player
- Elina Danielian - chess player
- Garry Kasparov - grandmaster and world champion
- Melikset Khachiyan - chess player
- Eduard Markarov - football player
- Alexander Mirzoyan - football player
- Yura Movsisyan - football player
- Ashot Nadanian - chess player
- Sergey Petrosyan - weightlifter

=== Writers ===
- Pertch Proshian - writer
- Alexander Shirvanzade - playwright and novelist, awarded by the "People's Writer of Armenia" and "People's Writer of Azerbaijan" titles

== See also ==
- Armenians in Azerbaijan
- List of Armenians
- List of Armenian Azerbaijanis
