= 1867 in Iran =

- Decades
- See also: Other events of 1867; Years in Iran

The following lists events that happened during 1867 in Qajar era.

== Incumbents ==
- Monarch: Naser al-Din Shah Qajar

== Births ==
- ? – Abu l-Hasan al-Isfahani, Iranian religious leader.
- ? – David Benjamin Keldani, Catholic convert to Islam.
- ? – Hassan Esfandiari, Iranian politician.
- ? – Seyid Mirbabayev, Azerbaijani singer.
