= Palace of Seyid Mirbabayev =

Palace in Azneft Square, Baku, Azerbaijan

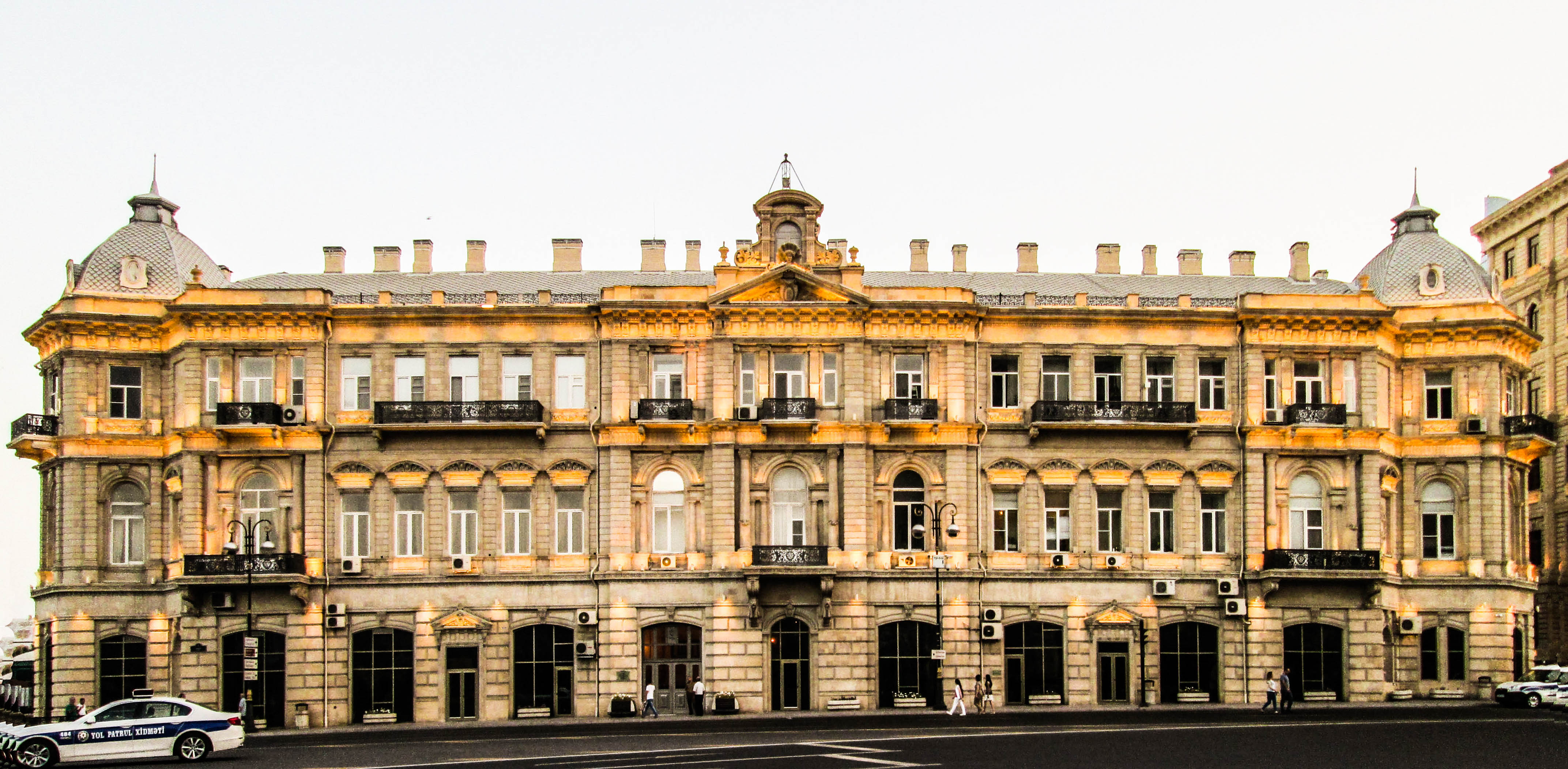

- Location within Azerbaijan
- 40.3619089°N 49.8311965°E
- Location: Azneft Square, Baku, Azerbaijan

History
- Founded: 1893—1895

Site notes
- Architect: Pavel Stern
- Architectural style: French Renaissance
- Current use: SOCAR
- Owner: Seyid Mirbabayev

The Palace of Seyid Mirbabayev is a palace in Azneft Square, Baku, Azerbaijan. It was owned by Seyid Mirbabayev, a singer who became one of the oil millionaires of Azerbaijan. The building was built in the style of French Renaissance architecture based on the architect Pavel Stern's project. The plasticity of the facade, the shape of the architectural detail, the individuality of the stone procession, the building culture have shaped the aesthetic environment in the image of the building.

== History ==
In 1893, the building attracted the attention of Seyid Mirbabayev, a newly-became rich Azerbaijani singer. Mirbabayev addressed Zeynalabdin Taghiyev for advice, and Taghiyev advised him to buy the palace and divide it into apartments for earning money. Then, Taghiyev wrote a letter of recommendation to Aramyan to help Mirbabayev buy the house. Aramyan sells the building at a cheaper price than previously planned. Since that time, the building is known among the local population as the house of Mirbabayev. The British Consulate was located on the first floor of the building during the Democratic Republic of Azerbaijan.

After the establishment of the Soviet power in Azerbaijan, Bolsheviks confiscated all the property of Seyid Mirbabayev. A millionaire himself must emigrate to France. After a while, the money that he brought with him ends, and Mirbabayev had to live on Paris streets for a while in a miserable way.

During the Soviet era, at the disposal of Azneft, after the independence of Azerbaijan (1991), the State Oil Company of Azerbaijan (SOCAR) was placed. In the 1990s, light reinstatement work was carried out in the building.

== Owner ==
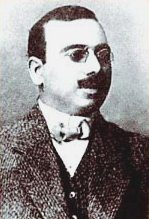
The owner of the building- Seyid Mirbabayev

Among people the palace is known as Seyid Mirbabayev's house. The singer was one of the stars of Baku weddings. The singing in a millionaire Shikhbalayev's only son's wedding changed the life of the singer. The groom's uncle gifted a land plot to the singer and after a while in this place the oil fountain appeared and Seyid Mirbabayev became a millionaire. Mirbabayev, who moved to Paris after the Baku operation, was in a miserable position in this city. Meanwhile, Teymur bey Ashurbeyov from the Ashurbeyovs' family met with the khanende and brought him to Tehran.Seyid Mirbabayev lived under the protection of Ashurbeyov in this city until his death.

== Location ==
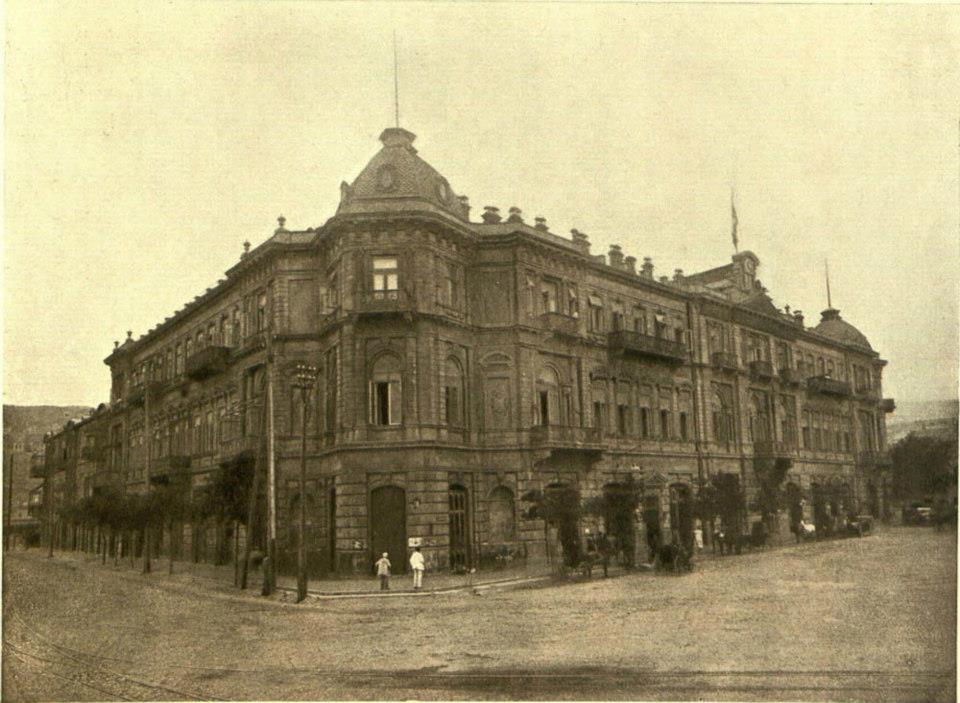
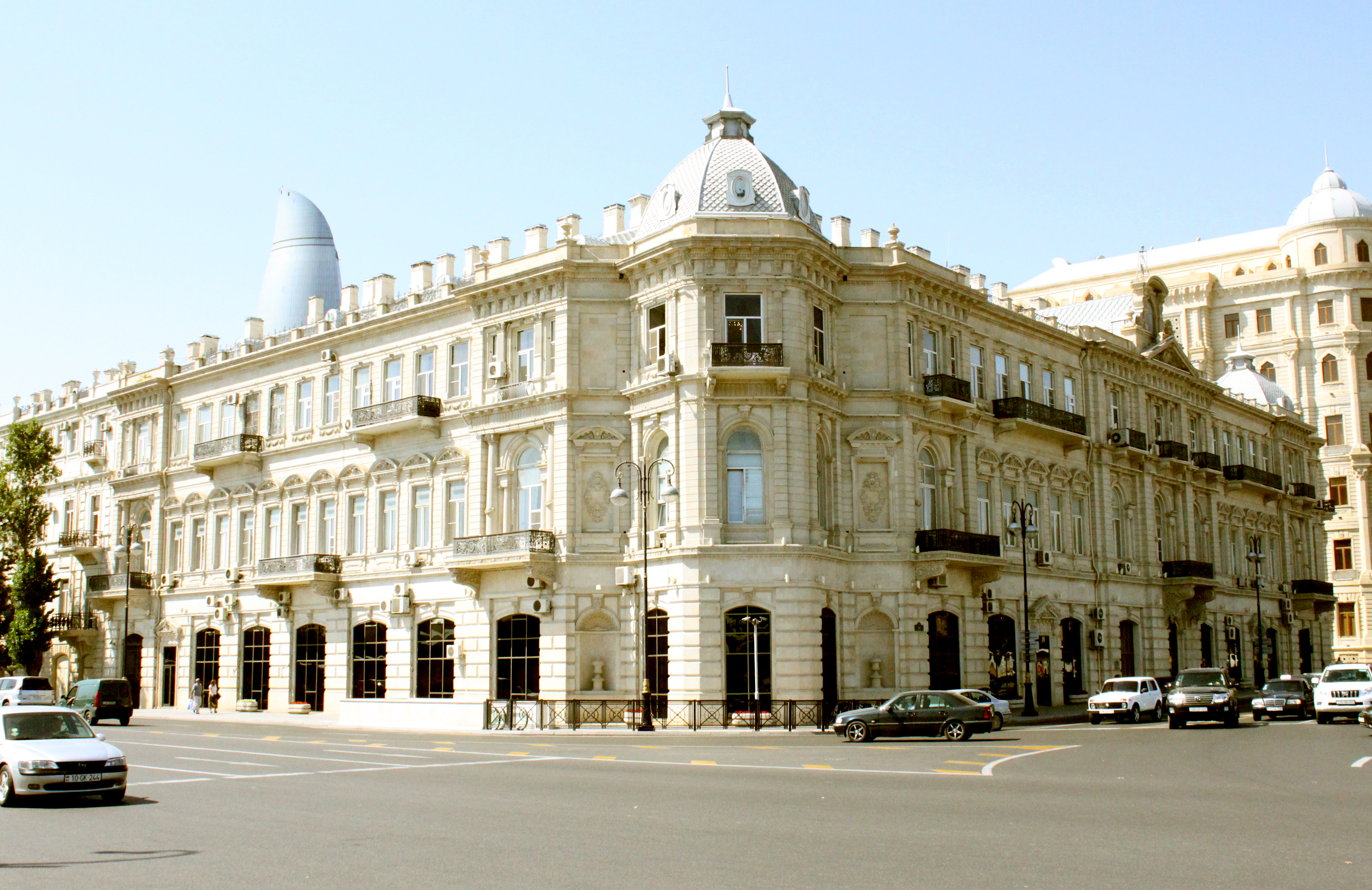
The Palace in years of 1905 and 2013.

The Niyazi (formerly Sadovaya) street, where the palace is located, was complementing the central part of the city, starting with Azneft Square. This street is also part of the circular highway around Icheri Sheher. The building were lying to the side of Bayil from this square. From the middle of the 19th century, the square was gradually changing. These changes accelerated after the construction of a three-storied palace on the basis of the architect Pavel Stern's project in the early 1890s, in the area called the Kokorevskiy area, one of the main parts of the square.

== Architectural features ==
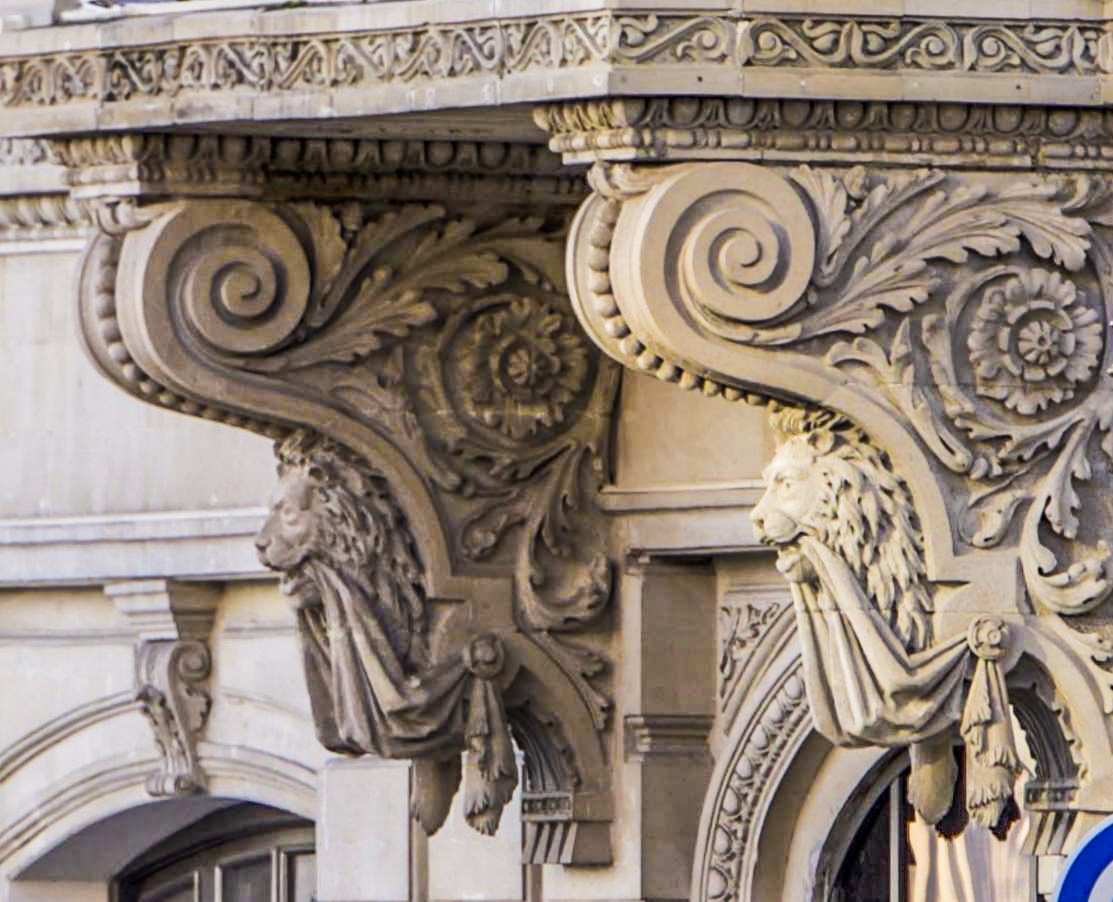
Facade details in the palace

The building was built in the style of French Renaissance architecture based on the architect Pavel Stern's project. The main facade of the building looks to the western side of the Caspian coast.
