= Mir Yusif Mirbabayev =

Azerbaijani linguistics scholar

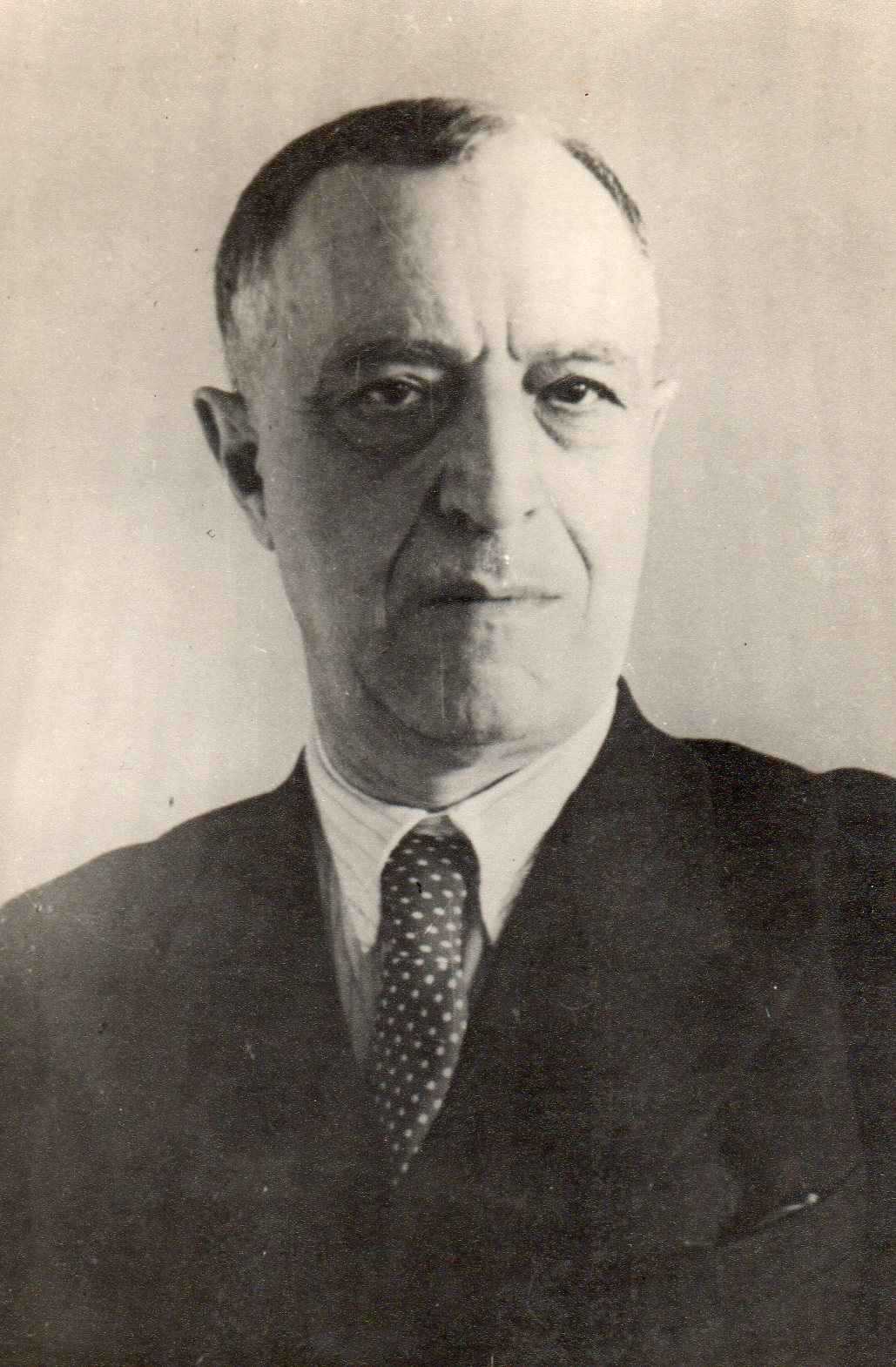
- Born: Mir Yusif Mir Abbas oglu Mirbabayev; 1889; Erivan, Russian Empire
- Died: 1951 (aged 61–62); Baku, Azerbaijan SSR, Soviet Union

Mir Yusif Mirbabayev (1889, in Erivan, Russian Empire – 1951, in Baku, Azerbaijan SSR, Soviet Union) was an Azerbaijani linguistics scholar director of the Institute of Linguistics at the Academy of Sciences of the Azerbaijan SSR. He was one of the authors and the scientific editor of the 4-volume Russian-Azerbaijani dictionary and a recipient of the Stalin Prize in 1948.

== Life ==
Mir Yusif Mirbabayev was born in 1889 in the city of Irevan. His father, Mirabbas Mirbabayev, was a prominent figure in Irevan and a member of the Irevan City Duma. Mir Yusif received his primary education at the Russian-Tatar and city gymnasiums in Irevan. In 1916, he graduated from the Law Faculty of Moscow University. He served as a clerk at the Azerbaijani People's Republic Embassy in the Republic of Armenia. He was also a member of the Irevan Muslim National Council and authored appeals to both Azerbaijan and Armenia, as well as to the representatives of the Entente powers in the South Caucasus, to cease the massacres against Azerbaijanis in Armenia.

After Armenia fell under Bolshevik influence, he worked at the Military Tribunal of the Armenian Revolutionary Committee and the People's Commissariat of Finance. He held positions as a department head and dean at the Irevan Pedagogical Technical School. He also worked as a research scholar at the History Institute of the Armenian Academy of Sciences and the State Museum. Mir Yusif was a member of the National Minorities Council and the New Turkic Alphabet Committee.

In 1933, he moved to Baku and began working in the field of linguistics. He worked as a scientific secretary at the Azerbaijan branch of the USSR Academy of Sciences and the branch's Dictionary Institute.

In 1944, he defended his doctoral thesis on the influence of the Azerbaijani language on the Armenian language. The research topic was titled "The Influence of the Turkic Language on the Armenian Language." In 1945, he was appointed as the first head of the Institute of Linguistics of the Azerbaijan National Academy of Sciences.

Mir Yusif Mirbabayev played a significant role in the preparation of the Soviet Azerbaijan Encyclopedia. He authored many articles on linguistics, drawing from sources in Arabic, Persian, Russian, English, French, Ottoman Turkish, and Armenian languages.

He was awarded the Stalin Prize in 1948 for his contribution to the preparation of a 4-volume Russian-Azerbaijani dictionary, prepared under the leadership of Academician Heydar Huseynov.

Mir Yusif Mirbabayev died in Baku on August 25, 1951.

== See also ==
- Heydar Huseynov
- Azerbaijanis in Armenia
