= Ismail Feyzullabeyli =

Azerbaijani writer (1925–2008)

- Born: 24 May 1925; Erivan, Armenia, TSFSR, Soviet Union
- Died: 2008 (aged 82–83); Baku, Azerbaijan
- Occupations: Writer and economist

Ismail Feyzullabeyli (born 24 May 1925, Erivan, Armenia, TSFSR, Soviet Union – d. 2008, Baku, Azerbaijan) was an Azerbaijani writer, scientist, and professor. He worked as a deputy secretary of the scientific council of the Ministry of Education of Azerbaijan.

== Life ==
Ismail Feyzullabeyli was born in Irevan on 24 May 1925. His father belonged to one of the famous bey families of Irevan, who were Azerbaijanis. The Feyzullabeyli family was forced to leave Irevan in 1926, and they migrated to Ganja. Ismail received his middle education in Ganja and was conscripted into the Soviet Army. In 1943, he graduated from the Moscow Infantry School. From 1943 to 1945, he fought against Nazi Germany in the Second World War. In the years 1947–1951, he studied at Azerbaijan State University of Economics. After graduating from university, he started working at the Azerbaijan National Academy of Sciences. However, due to his brother, who was killed by the Soviet NKVD during the Great Purge years, he was dismissed from this position. From 1961 to 1970, he worked at Azerbaijan State University, and in 1970, he was appointed as the dean of the Faculty of Trade Economy.

He is considered one of the most famous economists in Azerbaijan and has also had a significant influence among the Armenia Azerbaijanis in Azerbaijan. In addition to publishing numerous scientific works, he was also a writer. His most famous work is the novel titled Melahet.

Feyzullabeyli died in the city of Baku in 2008.
