= Khydyr Mustafayev =

Soviet Azerbaijani army colonel, Hero of the Soviet Union (1905–1975)

Khydyr Hasan oglu Mustafayev
- Xıdır Həsən oğlu Mustafayev
- Born: 27 March 1905; Gezaldara, Erivan Governorate, Russian Empire
- Died: 21 May 1975 (aged 70); Baku, Azerbaijan SSR, Soviet Union
- Military career
- Allegiance: Soviet Union
- Branch: Red Army
- Service years: 1927–1954
- Rank: Colonel
- Unit: 91st Separate Tank Brigade
- Conflicts: World War II; Battle of Stalingrad; Battle of Kursk; Battle of Kiev
- Awards: Hero of the Soviet Union

Khydyr Hasan oglu Mustafayev (Azerbaijani: Xıdır Həsən oğlu Mustafayev; 27 March 1905 – 21 May 1975) was an Azerbaijani Soviet Army Colonel and a Hero of the Soviet Union. Mustafayev was awarded the title on 10 January 1944 for his leadership of a battalion in the capture of Fastiv. Mustafayev retired from the army in 1954 and worked in senior positions in the party and government.

== Early life and military service ==
Mustafayev was born on 27 March 1905 in Gezaldara to a peasant family of eight children. In his childhood, he worked with his father on a farm. Later, Mustafayev worked in a copper mine. His father was imprisoned for participation in the Bolshevik movement. He attended the Likbez at age seventeen and graduated from ninth grade.

In 1927, Mustafayev was drafted into the Red Army. In 1930, he graduated from advanced training courses for commanders. In the same year, Mustafayev joined the Communist Party of the Soviet Union. He later became a platoon commander and then a company commander. For some time he also worked as a teacher in a military school.

== World War II ==
Mustafayev fought in combat from September 1942. He became a major and commander of the 91st Tank Brigade's motorized rifle and machine gun battalion, fighting on the outskirts of Stalingrad. In January 1943, he was reportedly wounded seriously in the chest, but continued to fight until completely exhausted due to blood loss. The battalion captured Orekhov, Alexandrovka, Novoalekseevka, reportedly inflicting losses to German troops. For his actions, Mustafayev was awarded the Order of the Red Star on 9 February 1942. Mustafayev was evacuated and received the award in June from Mikhail Kalinin in the Kremlin.

Mustafayev returned to his tank brigade in the Kursk Bulge and became commander of its motor rifle battalion. During the fight near Oryol he was awarded the Order of the Patriotic War 1st class for his actions on 30 July 1943. At the beginning of November, the brigade's 344th Tank Battalion and Mustafayev's motor rifle battalion, along with a company of anti-tank riflemen, carried out a 60-kilometer march to bypass Fastiv. At dawn on 7 November, tanks with infantry riding on them advanced into the city from the north. By the evening, Fastiv had been cleared of German troops. 60 guns, 16 trains, and five locomotives were reportedly captured. On 10 January, Mustafayev was awarded the title Hero of the Soviet Union and the Order of Lenin for his actions during the capture of Kiev, Fastiv, Berdychiv, and Zhytomyr. Mustafayev fought with the brigade until the end of the war. He participated in the captures of Proskurov and Ternopil. On 3 November 1944 he was awarded a second Order of the Red Star.

== Postwar ==
Mustafayev continued to serve in the army postwar. In 1947 he became military commandant of Baku. On 6 November 1947 he was awarded the Order of the Red Banner. Between 1949 and 1951 Mustafayev was commander of a tank regiment. He retired in 1954 with the rank of a colonel and then lived and worked in Baku. Later he graduated from university and worked in senior positions in the party and government. He was a deputy of the Supreme Soviet of the Azerbaijan SSR at its second and third convocations. Mustafayev was made an honorary citizen of Fastiv and Zhytomyr. In 1965, he published a memoir, "Шли танкисты", or "There were Tankers". Mustafayev died on 21 May 1975 and was buried in the Alley of Honor.

== Legacy ==
A street in Baku was named after Mustafayev. In 2005, a monument to Mustafayev was erected in Kiev.
