= Aznvadzor =

Aznvadzor Ազնվաձոր
- Location within Armenia
- Coordinates: 40°52′37″N 44°25′01″E
- Country: Armenia
- Province: Lori
- Elevation: 1,675 m (5,495 ft)

Population (2011)
  - Total: 380
- Time zone: UTC+4 (AMT)

Aznvadzor (Armenian: Ազնվաձոր) is a village in the Lori Province of Armenia.

== Geography ==
The village is located on the southern slopes of the Bazum ridge, 4 km from the city of Vanadzor. It occupies an area of 14.56 km^{2}. The area is partially covered with forests.

=== Climate ===
Yearly precipitation amounts to 600-700 mm.

== Demographics ==
Year	1831	1897	1926	1939	1959	1970	1979	1989	2001	2004	2005	2011	2012
Population	33	393	706	822	624	1041	1091	706	473	255	309	380	368

== Economy and culture ==
In 2016, the church of Surb Astvatsatsin (Armenian: Սուրբ Աստվածածին, lit. 'Holy Mother of God'), serving Aznvadzor and neighboring Bazum, was renovated and consecrated.

Near the village is a campsite called Aznvazor Eco Camp. The village has a school completed in 2003, a library and a medical point. The postal code for the village is 2025.
