= Bazum =

Bazum Բազում
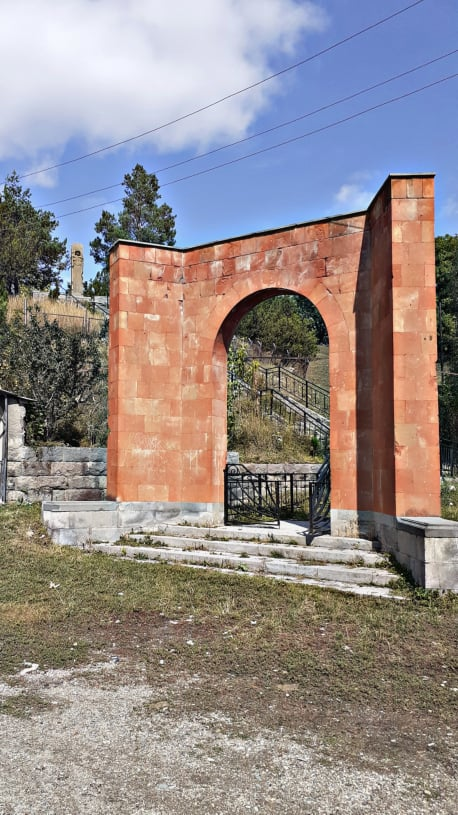

- Location within Armenia
- Coordinates: 40°52′05″N 44°26′44″E
- Country: Armenia
- Province: Lori
- Elevation: 1,615 m (5,299 ft)

Population (2011)
  - Total: 1,116
- Time zone: UTC+4 (AMT)

Bazum (Armenian: Բազում) is a village in the Lori Province of Armenia.
