= Balakənd, Sabirabad =

Balakənd
- Municipality
- Location within Azerbaijan
- Coordinates: 39°57′N 48°27′E
- Country: Azerbaijan
- Rayon: Sabirabad

Population (2010)
  - Total: 694
- Time zone: UTC+4 (AZT)
  - Summer (DST): UTC+5 (AZT)

Balakənd is a village and municipality in the Sabirabad Rayon of Azerbaijan. It has a population of 694.
