= Hasan Seyidov (scientist) =

Azerbaijani politician (1908–1999)

Hasan Ali oglu Seyidov
- Born: September 25, 1908; Erivan, Erivan Governorate, Russian Empire
- Died: June 8, 1999 (aged 90); Baku, Azerbaijan
- Education: Azerbaijan Agricultural Institute and Moscow All-Union Scientific-Research Fertilizer and Agro-Soil Science Institute
- Scientific career
- Fields: Chemistry
- Workplaces: Azerbaijan Agricultural Institute; Azerbaijan Communist Party

Hasan Ali oglu Seyidov (Azerbaijani: Həsən Əli oğlu Seyidov; 25 September 1908, Erivan, Erivan Governorate – 8 June 1999, Baku) was an Azerbaijani politician, scientist, chairman of the Baku Regional Executive Committee, Division chairman of the Society of Chemists named after D. I. Mendeleev and Azerbaijan SSR Minister of Agriculture.

== Life ==
Seyidov was born in 1908 in Erivan Governorate. In 1928, he graduated from the Azerbaijan Agricultural Institute, and in 1931-1934 he received doctoral studies at the Moscow All-Union Scientific-Research Fertilizer and Agro-Soil Science Institute. From 1937 to 1962, he worked as the director of the Azerbaijan Agricultural Research Institute, the Azerbaijan Agricultural Technology Institute. He also served as the head of the Ganja City Council Executive Committee. Hasan Seyidov, a member of the Communist Party had worked as a Head of the Agricultural Department of the Central Committee of the CP(B) of Azerbaijan, 3rd, 2nd Secretary of the Central Committee of the CP(B) of Azerbaijan, 1st Deputy Chairman of the Central Committee of the Azerbaijan SSR, Chairman of the Baku Regional Executive Committee, Chairman of the State Planning Commission (1953-1955). From 1955 to 1959, he became the minister of agriculture of the Azerbaijan SSR. He was elected a deputy of the Supreme Soviet of the Soviet Union of the 2nd, 3rd, 4th, and 5th convocations.

Seyidov died in 1999 and was buried in the II Alley of Honor in Baku.

== Awards ==
- Order of Lenin
- 2 Orders of the Red Banner of Labour
- Order of the Badge of Honour
