= Etibar Hajiyev =

Etibar Hajiyev (1971–1992) is a National Hero of Azerbaijan. He was born 5 Aprel 1971 in the Zod village of the Vardenis of the Armenian SSR. Etibar joined the National Army in 1992. He showed heroism during the liberation of the villages of Bolshoy Jabar, Maly Jan Bar, Buzlak, Erkey. He died on 13 June 1992 during the Shaumyan offensive in the battles for the liberation of the village of Agjakend.

Hajiyev was posthumously awarded National Hero of Azerbaijan by the President of Azerbaijan on 23 June 1992.
