= Kerim Allahverdiyev =

Soviet academic (born 1944)

- Born: 1 April 1944 (age 81); Yerevan, Soviet Union
- Citizenship: Soviet Union and Azerbaijani Republic
- Occupation: Physicist

Kerim Rehim oğlu Allahverdiyev (born April 1, 1944, Yerevan, Soviet Union) is a Doctor of Physical and Mathematical Sciences (1981), a professor, and a full member of the European Academy of Sciences.

== Life ==
Allahverdiyev was born in 1944 in the Armenian Soviet Socialist Republic, and after graduating from the Lebedev Physics Institute in Russia (now Moscow Power Engineering Institute), he began working at the Azerbaijan National Academy of Sciences in 1967. He pursued his doctoral studies from 1969 to 1972 and completed his Doctor of Sciences degree, the highest level of education in the Soviet academic system, in 1981. Allahverdiyev worked at Oxford University's Clarendon Laboratory from 1974 to 1975, and from 1991 to 1995, he served as a professor in the Physics Department at the Middle East Technical University in Ankara. In 1995, he became the department head at the TUBITAK Marmara Research Center, and since 2002, he has been the chief scientific researcher at the Physics Institute of the Azerbaijan National Academy of Sciences. Throughout his academic career, he collaborated with more than 40 academic institutions, including Moscow State University, Oxford University, Sheffield University, Imperial College London, MPI FKF, Stuttgart, RWTH Aachen, Bochum, Bayreuth, Tsukuba, Cincinnati, Madrid, Colorado, and Hamburg universities, as well as the United States Air Force Wright-Patterson Laboratory.

Allahverdiyev has authored 345 scientific articles, 3 book, 2 monographs, and holds 5 patents.

== Awards and honours ==
In 1988, he was honored with the Azerbaijan State Prize, one of the highest awards in Soviet Azerbaijan. In 1989, he received the "Window-on-Science" medal from Aachen Technical University. From 1987 to 1989, he was recognized with the Royal Society's award as a visiting professor at the European Space Research Center, earning him the honorary title of the Soviet Union's Scientist of the Year for this achievement.

== Selected works ==
- Аллахвердиев К. Р., Мустафаев Н. Б., Тагиев М. М. Пикосекундная спектроскопия свободных экситонов в "чистых" и легированных кристаллах селенида галлия. Bakı: Институт физики АН АзССР. 1988. 80.
- Аллахвердиев К. Р., Салаев Ф.М., Микаилов Ф.А., Мамедов Т.С. Слабое сегнетоэлектричество в слоистых сегнетоэлектриках-полупроводниках A3S3C62. 56. JETP Letters. 153.
- K. R. Allakhverdiev, Namık Mustafaev, Nisa Seid-Rzaeva. Vibrational Frequencies of the Impurity Atoms in Layered GaSe. 20. Turkish Journal of Physics. 1996. 1256–1265.
- K. R. Allakhverdiev, N. Ismailov, Z. Salaeva, F. Mikailov, A. Gulubayov, T. Mamedov, and S. Babaev. Reflective Light Modulator Based on ε-GaSe Crystal. 41. Applied Optics. 2002. 148–153.
- K. R. Allakhverdiev, U. A. Aleshenko, N. A. Bakhyshov, L. K. Vodopyanov, F. M. Gashimzade, R. M. Sardarly, V. Ya. Shteinshraiber. Vibrational Spectrum of TlSxSe1–x Solid Solutions. 127. Physica status solidi. 1985. 459–464.
- K. R. Allakhverdiev, M. A. Nizametdinova, N. Yu. Safarov, L. K. Vodopyanov, L. V. Golubev. Raman Scattering. Raman Scattering in TlSexS1−x Crystals. 102. Physica status solidi. 1980.
- K. R. Allakhverdiev, T. G. Mamedov, E. Yu. Salaev, I. K. Efendieva. The Fundamental Absorption Spectra of Tiinse2 Crystals Under Pressure. 117. 1983.
- E. Yu. Salayev, K. R. Allahverdiyev. Dinamicheskie i Staticheskie Helinejnije Effekti v SloistixKristallax Tipa Selenida Gallija. Bakı: Elm. 1993. 293.
- K. R. Allahverdiyev, M. O. Yetish, T. K. Baykar, S. M. T. Near IR Laser Light Visualizators Using Gase and Other Layered Crystals. Laser Physics. 2011. 1–3.
- K. R. Allkahverdiev, T. Baykara. Past, Present and Future of GaSe and Related Crystals- Layered Materials with Outstanding Non-linear Optical Properties. Optics and Precision Engineering. 2011. 68–80.
- K. R. Allahverdiyev; və b. Size-induced Effects in Gallium Selenide Electronic Structure: The Influence of Interlayer Interaction. B84. Phys. Rev. 2011.
- S. Zahner, L. Kador, K. R. Allahverdiyev, E. Yu. Salayev, M. F. Huseyinoglu. Fluorescence Life Time Imaging Microscopy and Polar-plot Analysis of Gallium Selenide Crystals. J. Appl. Phys. 2014.
