= Balakend, Saatly =

Balakend
- Location within Azerbaijan
- Coordinates: 39°57′N 48°27′E
- Country: Azerbaijan
- Rayon: Saatly
- Time zone: UTC+4 (AZT)
  - Summer (DST): UTC+5 (AZT)

Balakend is a village in the Saatly Rayon of Azerbaijan.
