= Rafael Kaprelyan =

Soviet Armenian test pilot (1909–1984)

- Born: Rafael Ivanovich Kaprelyan; 5 May [O.S. 22 April] 1909; Baku, Russian Empire
- Died: 12 July 1984 (aged 75); Moscow, Soviet Union
- Military career
- Allegiance: Soviet Union
- Branch: Soviet Air Force
- Service years: 1941–1945
- Rank: podpolkovnik (1975)
- Conflicts: World War II
- Awards: Hero of the Soviet Union

Rafael Ivanovich Kaprelyan (Armenian: Ռաֆաել Իվանի Կապրելյան; 5 May [O.S. 22 April] 1909 in Baku – 12 July 1984 in Moscow) was a decorated Armenian-Soviet test pilot who received the title Hero of the Soviet Union in 1975.

== Early life ==
Kaprelyan was born on 5 May 1909 in Baku to the family of Armenian doctor Hovnan Kaprelyan. He graduated from Leningrad Institute of Civil Air Fleet Engineers in 1932, and Bataysk Military Aviation School of Pilots in 1934. He worked as an airline pilot before World War II, mastering various Soviet transport aircraft of that era. During the war, he was the second-in-command of a special forces airgroup, fulfilling tasks of the General Staff. During one such flight, he landed poorly as a result of acute icing and was taken as a POW by the Nazis, but he managed to escape and found himself among partisans. He was later appointed commander of the 89th bomber regiment.

== Test pilot career ==
Starting in 1947 he worked as a test pilot at the Flight Research Institute, where he flew various weather condition tests on the Tu-4 and conducted various other tests on B-25, Li-2, and Tu-2 aircraft. From 1950 to 1952 he worked as a test pilot at an aircraft factory in Tushino, but switched to test-driving buses after that aircraft factory converted to a bus factory in 1952. The next year he transferred to the Mil Helicopter Design Bureau, where he worked as a senior test pilot. There, he carried out the maiden flights of the Mi-6, Mi-10, and Mi-10K helicopters. He also set several aviation records, including payload records on the Mi-6 in 1956 and again in 1962. He also participated in tests of the Mi-2, Mi-4, and Mi-8.

== Awards ==
- Hero of the Soviet Union (15 May 1975)
- Two Orders of Lenin (6 December 1949 and 15 May 1975)
- Order of the Red Banner (2 April 1943)
- Order of the Patriotic War 1st class (22 September 1944)
- Two Orders of the Red Banner of Labour (31 July 1948 and 12 July 1957)
- Two Orders of the Red Star (26 November 1941, 1 December 1943)
- Order of the Badge of Honour (31 July 1961)
- Medal "For Battle Merit" (3 November 1944)
- campaign and jubilee medals
