= Garib Mammadov =

Azerbaijani politician

Garib Shamil оgli Mammadov
- Born: 6 January 1947; Yeni Yol, Amasy district of the Armenian Soviet Socialist Republic
- Education: Azerbaijan Pedagogic Institute
- Known for: Doctor of biological sciences, academician-secretary of Department of Agrarian Sciences of Azerbaijan National Academy of Sciences, professor
- Awards: "Qizil Kure"
- Scientific career
- Workplaces: Azerbaijan National Academy of Sciences

Garib Mammadov (Azerbaijani: Qərib Məmmədov Şamil oğlu) is an Azerbaijani politician. He served on the National Assembly of Azerbaijan.

Mammadov has also been secretary of Department of Agrarian Sciences of Azerbaijan National Academy of Sciences (2011) and Chairman of State Land and Cartography Committee of Azerbaijan Republic.

== General information ==
Mammadov Garib Shamil was born in the village of Yeniyol, Amasia, Ağbaba region of the Armenian Republic. Father is Mammadov Shamil Mamoy, mother is Mammadova Masma Rajab. In 1965 Mammadov Garib successfully left secondary school in Amasia, in 1966 he entered geography-biological faculty of the Azerbaijan State Teachers Training Institute named after V.I.Lenin, where was a secretary of the "Komsomol" organization and a member of scientific and student's society. In 1970 year after graduating from the Institute with honors, began his labor activity as the laboratory assistant in Scientific Research Sector of Erosion, then worked at Institute of Soil science and Agrochemistry of ANAS consistently in positions: junior scientist (1972–1980), senior scientist (1980–1984), head of the laboratory (1984–1994), director of the Institute (1994–2000). In 1979 HAC USSR gave him with an academic degree of the doctor of philosophy on agrarian sciences, and in 1992 – Dr.Sci.Biol. on ecology, and also professor's rank.

Garib Mammadov was elected a deputy of Milli Majlis (Parliament) of the Azerbaijan Republic (1996) in the I convocation. From 1997 to 2001 was a chairman of the State Land Committee of the Azerbaijan Republic, and from 2001 to 2015 – State Committee on land and Cartography. Since 2004 a head of the department of Soil science in the faculty of Ecology and Soil science of Baku State University. From in 2011 to 2016 worked as an academician – secretary of the Department of Agrarian sciences in ANAS. Since 2016 – the Adviser of ANAS for agrarian problems. He is married, has two children.

== Political career ==
- In 1978 defends the PhD dissertation "Agroecological characteristic and bonitation of pasturable soils of the Western part of the Mill steppe".
- 1979-2013-Opposed the dissertation of authors of dissertation from Moldova, Bashkiria, Dagestan and Azerbaijan on soilscience, ecology, biology, melioration, geography specialties on Council for protection of doctoral dissertations of Institute of Soilscience and Agrochemistry of Azerbaijan National Academy of Sciences.
- In 1979 the Highest Attestation Commission of the USSR awards to Mammadov Garib Shamil ogli by scientific degree of the candidate of agricultural sciences.
- In 1980 gave lectures at Geographical Faculty of the Azerbaijani Teacher Institute of V.I.Lenin.
- In 1980–1984 works as the senior research assistant of Institute of Soilscience and Agrochemistry of AS of Azerbaijan.
- In 1984–1994 works as the head of laboratory at Institute of Soilscience and Agrochemistry of AS of Azerbaijan.
- In 1991 defends the doctoral dissertation "Ecological assessment of agricultural and postwood soils of Azerbaijan."
- In 1992 Highest Attestation Commission of USSR awards G.Sh.Mammadov by scientific degree of the Dr.Sci.Biol. in "Ecology". The same year the Highest Attestation Commission at the President of the Azerbaijan Republic awards him as to the unique and first professor in "Ecology" field of the Republic.
- Since 1993 till now acts with scientific The reports on the congresses "Energy, Ecology, Economy".
- In 1994 the Presidium of AS of Azerbaijan appoints him the director of Institute of Soilscience and Agrochemistry of AS of Azerbaijan. Being the director, at the same time he was the Chairman of the Academic Council and Specialized Council for protection of doctoral dissertations.
- 1994-The full member and the academician-secretary of the International Academy of Ecoenergetic.
- In 1994 the Presidium of AS of Azerbaijan appoints him the director of Institute of Soilscience and Agrochemistry of AS of Azerbaijan. Being the director, at the same time he was the Chairman of the Academic Council and Specialized Council for protection of doctoral dissertations.
- In 1994–1996, Mammadov was an expert on agriculture and member of High Attestation Commission of the President of the Republic of Azerbaijan.
- In 1995, he was elected member to National Assembly of Azerbaijan from Khatai district of Baku.
- In 1996-elected deputy of Milli Mejlis (Parliament) of Azerbaijan (I Convocation). Being the deputy, he was the member of the constant Commission of Milli Majlis on an ecology question, and also the member of Inter-parliamentary Group-Azerbaijan-China.
- In 1996 makes The report: "Agroecological bases of reproduction of the degraded lands and ecological model of soil fertility of Azerbaijan" in Adana, Turkey.
- 1997-By the Decree (No.627) of the National Leader, Mr. President Heydar Aliyev is appointed to the post of Chairman of the State Land Committee of the Azerbaijan Republic.
- In 1997-business trip in the National Republic of China as a participants of group of members of the Azerbaijanian Parliament.
- Since 1998-The member of the State Commission on questions of frontiers.
- Since 1998-The chairman at Ecology foundation of H.Aliyev.
- In 1998 takes part in work of the XVI International Congress of Society of the Soilscientists passing in the Montpeller (France) where he made the reports: "Influence of anthropogenous factors on soils under agricultural and other plants" and "Maps of an ecological assessment and their practical value".
- In 1998 on the XVI International Congress of Society of Soilscientists is selected the life member of the International Society of Soilscientist.
- In 1999 in the Dushanbe (Tajikistan) speaks at the International Conference on "Problems of diagnostics of a food of agricultural plants" by subject: "Influence of ecological factors on accumulation of food elements in a lucerne in the conditions of Azerbaijan".
- From 1999 to 2006 -gave lectures on a subject: "Ecology and land reforms" in State Academy of Public Administration under the President of the Azerbaijan Republic.
- In 2000 in the Suzdal city (Russia) makes The report at the III Congress of Society of Soilscientists of V.Dokuchayev on a subject: "Ecological condition of mining areas and prospect of their improvement"
- Since 2000-The report on the International Congress "Energy, Ecology, Economy" on a subject "An assessment of influence of the petropolluted soils on environment" Baku.
- Since 2001-The full member of the International Academy "Noosphere".
- Since 2001-The full member of the Russian Academy of Ecology.
- Since 2001-The member of Advisory Council of Highest Attestation Commission at the President of Azerbaijan Republic. At the same year he is selected the President of Society of Soilscientists of Azerbaijan.
- In 2001 He is chosen the correspondent member of Azerbaijan National Academy of Sciences, the foreign member of the Russian Academy of Natural Sciences.
- 2002-2005-chairman of State Examination Commission at Geography and Biology Faculty of the Baku State University.
- 2003– The report: "Geodesy in Azerbaijan and a current state, problems and prospects of development of cartography" at the II scientific-practical conference "Prospects of development of cartography and geodesy in Azerbaijan", Baku.
- 2003– The report: "Methodical aspects of a bioecological assessment of soils fertility of Azerbaijan" at the International scientific-practical conference "Achievements and modern problems of an agrarian science in the field of animal husbandry and plant growing", Barnaul, Russia.
- 2003– The report: "Modern level of development of national system of cartography in the Azerbaijan Republic" at scientific-practical conference "National cartography", Kyiv, Ukraine.
- Since 2004 is appointed the member of council of the National Encyclopedia by the President of the President of the Azerbaijan Republic, Mr. I.Aliyev.
- 2004– The report: "A modern level of development of digital soil maps in Azerbaijan" at the IV Congress of Dokuchayev Society of soilscientists "Land-national property of Russia", Moscow.
- 2004-Performance at Interstate Council on XXI Session of geodesy, cartography, cadastre and distance research of Earth. Baku.
- From 2004 year to 2015– By the Decree (No.474) of the Mr.President Ilham Aliyev is appointed to the post of Chairmen of State Land and Cartography Committee of Azerbaijan Republic.
- Since 2005 till now- head of Soilscience Department of Biology Faculty to Baku State University.
- Since 2007 Full member of Azerbaijan National Academy of Sciences.
- Since 2010 is appointed the Member of Republican Council for the Organization and Coordination of Scientific Researches (RCOCSR), and also the Chairman of Problem Council for Ecological Sciences at RCOCSR.
- Since 2011 at the Decree of the President of the Azerbaijan Republic, Mister Ilham Aliyev he is appointed the responsible secretary of the State Commission on formation of the "National Atlas of Azerbaijan".
- Since 2011 Co-chairman of Federation of Eurasian Soilscience Societies.
- From 2012 Honourable member of Soilscientist Society of Moldova.
- In 2012 on the basis of results of poll conducted among the respondents organized by the Eurasian Center for Opinion Research was awarded by the national Award "Kizil Kure" ("Golden Ball") for the implementation of land reforms and rational use land resources in Republic.
- In 2012 participated on International cartographic conference organized by UN Asia and the Pacific Ocean and Selected is one of 11 members Regional Committee of the Executive Council of the UN for management of Geospactial Information for Asia and the Pacific Ocean.
- In 2012 participated "The Caspian: Technologies for the environment" at the III International environmental exhibition.
- In 2012 organized XXXIV session of the CIS Interstate Council for coordination issues, geodesy, cartography, cadastre and promote of land on a remote spent in Baku, Azerbaijan.
- In 2013 participated on Second High-Level Forum of Management of Geospatial Information UN.
- In 2013 participated in the Extraordinary General Assembly of "EuroGeographics" Yevle and Stockholm, Sweden.
- In 2013 participated in 20th International Steering Committee for Global Mapping.
- In 2013 participated in meetings of the Twinning Project, Cambridge, England.

== Works ==
Mammadov is the author of over 400 scientific works, 21 monographs and books, 20 methodical recommendations and booklets, maps of lands and ecological assessment of lands of Azerbaijan, as well as the author of numerous scientific studies on land cadastre, ecological fruitfulness model of lands, ecological assessment of lands, land valuation, monitoring of ecological quality of lands, founder of the concept on study of ecological problems of the Republic of Azerbaijan. Scientific solution of issues on economic (monetary) assessment of lands that is of big importance in implementation of land reforms belongs to Mammadov.

Since 1994, he's held the position of the Director of Soil Science and Agrochemistry Institute of Academy of Sciences of Azerbaijan. He is also the President of Azerbaijan Soil Scientists Society. Since 2001, Mammadov is an associate member of National Academy of Sciences of Azerbaijan, academician of International Ecology and Energy Academy, member of Russia Ecology Academy, full member of International Noosfer Academy, full member of Russian Academy of Sciences, from 10 May 2002 academician of International Academy of Sciences.

== Awards ==
- Mammadov has been awarded with V.V. Dokuchaev Medal in 1983;
- "Silver Medal" of Ministry of Agriculture and Food of USSR in 1987;
- Azerbaijani American Cultural Center Award in 1999;
- Heydar Aliyev Medal, Russian Academy of Sciences Medal in 2001.

== See also ==
- Cabinet of Azerbaijan
- Agriculture in Azerbaijan
