= State Land and Cartography Committee (Azerbaijan) =

Mapping agency in Azerbaijan

State Land & Cartography Committee of Azerbaijan Republic
- Azərbaycan Respublikası Dövlət Torpaq və Xəritəçəkmə Komitəsi
- Coat of Arms of Azerbaijan

Agency overview
- Formed: April 18, 2001
- Headquarters: 93a Sh. Mehdiyev Street, Baku, Azerbaijan Republic AZ1001
- Agency executives: Garib Mammadov, chairman; Azad Nagiyev, deputy chairman
- Website: www.dtxk.gov.az

The State Land and Cartography Committee of Azerbaijan Republic (Azerbaijani: Azərbaycan Respublikası Dövlət Torpaq və Xəritəçəkmə Komitəsi) is a governmental agency within the Cabinet of Azerbaijan in charge of implementing land cadastre, monitoring and reforms; restoration and increasing of land productivity, setting territorial units in Azerbaijan Republic. The ministry is headed by Garib Mammadov.

== History ==
On July 17, 1992, the Azerbaijani government established State Land Committee according to Presidential Decree No. 54. of the Republic of Azerbaijan. In 2001, both the State Land Committee and State Geodesy and Mapping Committee were abolished and according to Presidential Decree No. 460 dated April 18, 2001, the new State Land and Cartography Committee was established in their place.

== Structure ==
The committee is headed by its chairman and deputy chairman. Main functions of the committee include implementation of land cadastre, land monitoring, topography, mapping, land reform, restoration and increase of land productivity, carrying out delimitation and demarcation of state frontiers of the Republic of Azerbaijan, frontier waters and sector of Caspian Sea (lake) belonging to the Republic of Azerbaijan; creating a land information bank, control over observance of legislation on land, geodesy and cartography; making proposals to the Cabinet of the Republic of Azerbaijan; taking actions to forecast geodynamic (quake, slip etc.) and other emergencies, informing other executive power bodies and the Cabinet of the Republic of Azerbaijan on this.

State Land Structure Project Institute, State Land Cadastre and Monitoring Science Production Center, State Aerogeodesy Institution, Baku Mapping Factory are all state institutions subordinate to the committee.

The committee cooperates with respective state bodies of Ukraine, Russia, Belarus, Kazakhstan, Dagestan, Tajikistan etc.

== See also ==
- Cabinet of Azerbaijan
- Administrative divisions of Azerbaijan
