= Seyid Mirbabayev =

Azerbaijani singer

Seyid Mirbabayev Azerbaijani: Seyid Mirtağı oğlu Mirbabayev
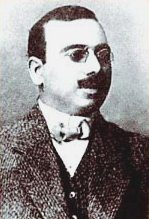

Background information
- Born: 1867; Baku
- Died: 1953 (aged 85–86) Tehran
- Genres: Mugham
- Occupation: Singer-Khanende
- Instrument: Gramophone

Seyid Mirbababev (Azerbaijani: Seyid Mirtağı oğlu Mirbabayev) was an Azerbaijani singer, khanende, and oil industrialist of the late 19th and early 20th centuries.

The prototype of Seyid Mirbabayev was created by the composer Jahangir Jahangirov in his opera "The Fate of the Singer".

== Life ==
Seyid Mirbabayev was born in 1867 in Baku. He lived and worked in Baku.

Mirbabayev took an active part in the work of the Baku mugham meetings. A number of mugham performed by Seyid Mirbababev were recorded on gramophone records.

In 1906 Mirbabayev received an invitation to Riga to record his performance by gramophone. The singer was one of the stars of Baku weddings. Singing in a millionaire Shikhbalayev's only son's wedding changed the life of the singer, as the groom's uncle gifted a plot of land to the singer. An oil fountain was discovered on his plot and Mirbabayev became a millionaire. Having become one of the representatives of the oil industry and a wealthy man, Mirbababev moved away from music.

He began to feel embarrassed about his former profession, and even bought up his records and smashed them into smithereens so that nothing reminisced about his past .In Baku Mirbababev bought a building called "Governor's House" (built in 1865-1867), where the Azerbaijan State Conservatory was located since 1920 and Mirbababev rented it to the governors of Baku. The current building of Azneft (Built in 1896), which was acquired from Aramyan and in which Mirbabayev lived until the establishment of Soviet power in Azerbaijan in 1920. After 1920, Mirbababev emigrated to Paris.

Mirbabayev, who moved to Paris after the Baku operation, was in a miserable position in this city. Meanwhile, Teymur bey Ashurbeyov from the Ashurbeyovs' family met with the khanende and brought him to Tehran. Seyid Mirbabayev lived under the protection of Ashurbeyov in this city until his death.

Seyid Mirbabayev died in 1953 in Tehran.
