= Heydar Huseynov =

Azerbaijani philosopher (1908–1950)

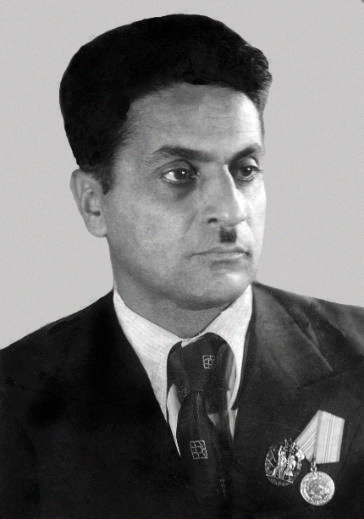
Image of Heydar Huseynov

Dr. Heydar Najaf oglu Huseynov (Azeri: Heydər Hüseynov) (3 April 1908, Yerevan – 15 August 1950, Baku) was an Azerbaijani philosopher and academician.

== Life ==
Huseynov was born in Erivan (present-day Yerevan, Armenia) into the petty bourgeois family of Haji Najaf Karbalai Huseynoglu and his wife Mashadi Gulsum, being the youngest of their six children. His father died shortly after Heydar's birth. After their eldest son Yusif was killed in an ethnic conflict in 1918, the family moved first to Batumi, then to Stavropol, until they finally settled in Baku where he received secondary education, graduated from the Azerbaijan State Pedagocical Institute with a degree in linguistics in 1931 and a Candidate of Sciences degree in philosophy. He was fluent in Persian. Beginning in 1932, Huseynov taught philosophy at various postsecondary institutions and published his works Dialectical Materialism (1935) and Dialects and metaphysics (1939) in Azeri. From 1936 on, he was involved in the publishing of the Azerbaijani Soviet Encyclopædia and in 1940 he became head of the project. He was the editor of the four-volume Russian-Azeri Dictionary, for which he was awarded Stalin Prize, the highest ranking award in the Soviet Union at the time. In 1944, he was appointed Chairman of the Presidium of the Azerbaijan National Academy of Sciences. Almost simultaneously Huseynov wrote his fundamental 733-page work entitled On the history of Azerbaijani phisolophical and sociopolitical thought in the nineteenth century (it was published in 1948). His work was recognised with him being granted a doctoral degree along with being promoted to Professor of Marxism–Leninism. In addition, he was awarded with his second Stalin Prize in March 1950. Overall Huseynov wrote around 100 scientific works, mostly having to do with Azerbaijani literary thought.

== Criticism and death ==
Despite immediate positive recognition of his prize-winning work, Huseynov's work was met with criticism by the Communist Party organs in May 1950. Huseynov was accused of presenting muridism, a philosophical Sufi movement in the Caucasus in the mid-19th century, and specifically its propagator Imam Shamil, in the preface to his book as a "progressive democratic national liberation phenomenon (...) contrary to Marxist ideas and (...) the movement's reactionist and nationalist nature that served the interests of the English capitalism and the Turkish sultan." Upon reviewing the monograph, the Committee for Stalin Prize in the field of literature and arts forwarded its observations to the Council of Ministers of the Soviet Union and as a result, Huseynov was stripped of his award. Huseynov was excluded from the Communist Party and laid off from the Academy of Sciences. Unable to deal with criticism from the state organs and his own colleagues and foreseeing his arrest, Huseynov committed suicide by slicing his veins on 15 August 1950.
