= Geydere =

Geydere may refer to:

- Gëydere, Kalbajar, Azerbaijan
- Goydərə, Gobustan, Azerbaijan
- Göydərə, Azerbaijan
