= Goydərə =

Goydərə may refer to:

- Gëydere, Azerbaijan
- Goydərə, Gobustan, Azerbaijan
- Göydərə, Azerbaijan
