= Jugha Bridge =

Bridge in Azerbaijan

The Jugha Bridge is an Azerbaijani architectural monument from the 12th-13th centuries.

This bridge was built over the Araz River along a caravan route, and the nearby city of Jugha became a major trading hub due to its location. Today, the ruins of the ancient city of Jugha can be found in a narrow valley near modern Julfa city. With the construction of Jugha Bridge over the Araz River, the city gained importance as a major center on an international trade route. Only the ruins of the bridge have survived to this day. Currently, only 5 piers of the Jugha Bridge remain. Except for the first pier, the others are in poor condition. These are remnants of stone masonry whose outer layer has fallen off. On the surface of the intact riverside pier, you can still see the base of the bridge arch, with rows of circular holes.

== Jugha city ==
Jugha — an archaeological monument, a medieval settlement located northwest of Gülüstan, in the Julfa District. Historical sources mention Jugha as one of the major trading hubs on the Silk Road, predominantly inhabited by Armenians, as suggested by the graves found in the city's cemetery. The cross-stones in the Jugha necropolis represent a special group of Armenian cross-stones, of great historical importance.

The city is bordered by a mountain range in the north, the Araz River in the south, and the cemetery in the west. The remains of many buildings, particularly baked brick structures, are scattered throughout the area. Archaeological finds, including glazed and unglazed pottery and coins, indicate that the city flourished from the 11th to the 17th centuries.

== History ==
The bridge gained fame for its beauty soon after it was built. Hamdu'llah Mustawfi in his work "Nuzhat al-Qulub" briefly mentions a beautiful bridge built by Ziyaul-Mulk Nakhchivani over the Araz River, which is believed to be Jugha Bridge. The city of Gargar mentioned in the text is now located in Southern Azerbaijan, near Julfa city, on the Marand-Julfa road.

=== Construction technique ===
Built with red sandstone and lime mortar, the bridge's riverside pier reflects a high level of construction expertise. Sharaf ad-Din Ali Yazdi, a historian of Amir Timur, described the bridge in detail, praising its sturdy stone construction and beautiful, high arches. The bridge’s ruins still show traces of a caravanserai, believed to have been located along the road leading up to the bridge.

=== Caravanserais ===
Near Julfa, on both sides of the river, two caravanserais dating back to the 14th century were built near another bridge. These caravanserais are considered integral parts of the trading complex and point to the strategic importance of the site.

The Jugha caravanserai, one of the finest examples in Azerbaijan, was discovered in 1974 during field research. Further studies in 1978 revealed the full plan of the building. Although part of it was destroyed during the construction of the Baku-Julfa railway in 1939-1940, much of the caravanserai remains intact, with rooms and other structures demonstrating advanced architectural techniques.
