= Armenians of Julfa =

Julfa, also called Jugha or Djulfa, a historic town located in modern-day Azerbaijan, was once home to a thriving Armenian community known for their art, culture, and trade. The Armenians who lived in Julfa were primarily members of the Armenian Apostolic Church.

== History ==
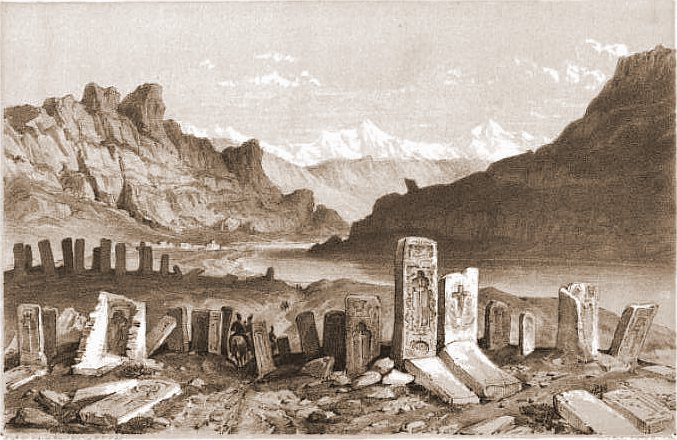
Armenian Cemetery in Julfa (1830, Francis Rawdon Chesney)

The history of Julfa's Armenian community dates back to the 6th century, when Armenians first settled in the region. Over the centuries, the community grew and prospered, establishing trade connections with neighboring cities and towns and becoming known for their expertise in craftsmanship.

Approximately 250,000 to 300,000 Armenians were forcibly displaced from the area between 1604 and 1605, with many dying while attempting to cross the Arax River. Most of the Armenians were eventually relocated to Iranian Azerbaijan, where they joined the Armenians who had already established themselves there. Additionally, a number of individuals were transported to areas such as Mazandaran, and urban centers like Sultanieh, Qazvin, Mashhad, Hamadan, Arak, and Shiraz. Those who were affluent and hailed from Julfa were particularly sent to Esfahan, the Safavid capital, where they were provided with preferential treatment and endured less difficulty during their relocation. The Julfa population established their settlement along the shores of the Zayandeh Rud river. They were provided with a new town, known as New Julfa (Nor Jugha), which was constructed exclusively for them in the year 1605.

== Armenian cemetery in Julfa ==
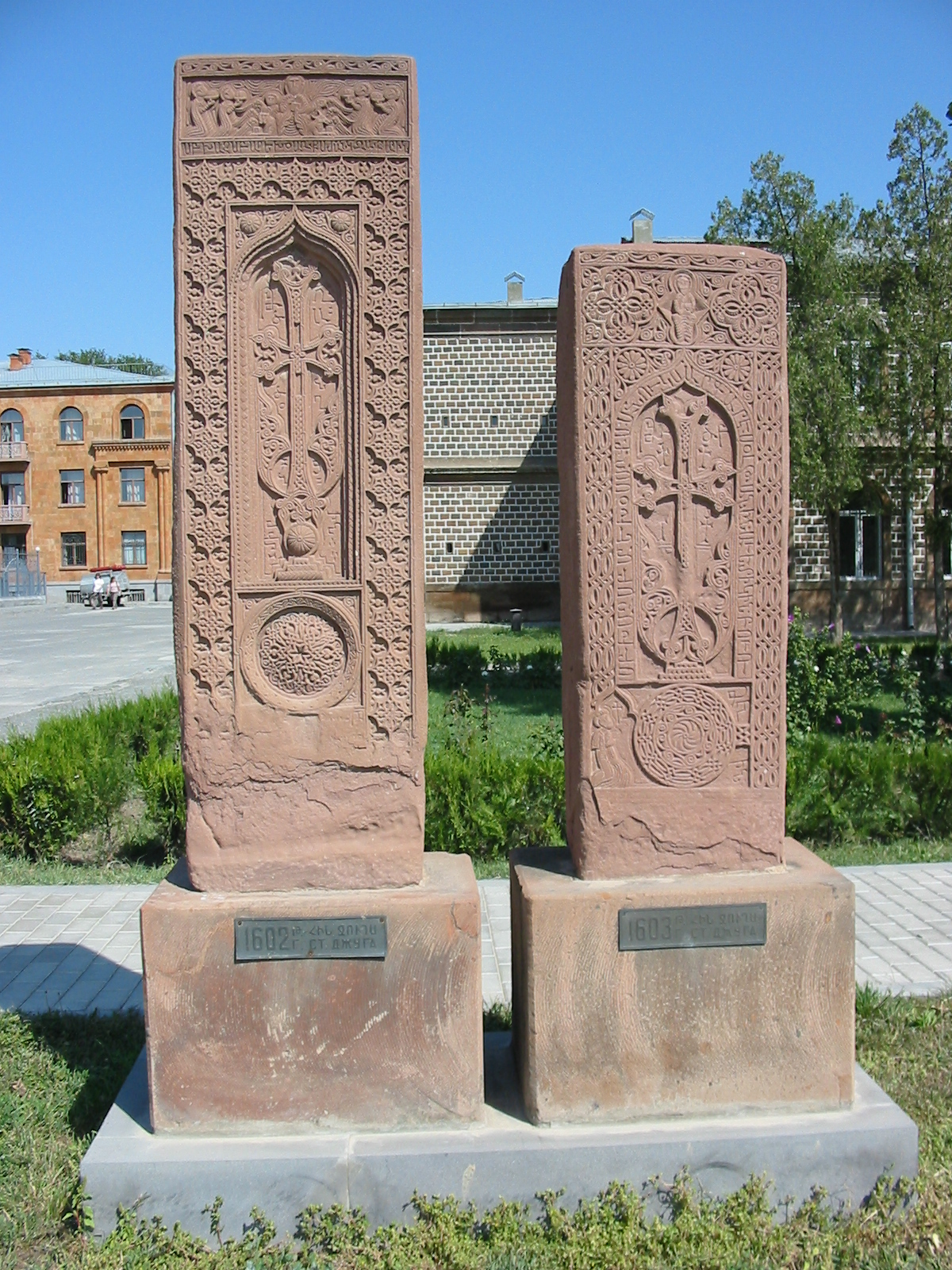
Two Julfa khachkars, dated 1602 and 1603, removed from the graveyard before its destruction and now on display at Echmiadzin, Armenia.

One of the most famous landmarks in Julfa was the Khachkar Cemetery, which featured thousands of intricately carved stone crosses, or khachkars, that marked the graves of Armenian residents. The cemetery was established in the 17th century and continued to be used until the deportation of the Armenian population of Julfa in 1604 by the Persian Safavid dynasty.

In 2006, reports emerged that the Azerbaijani government was deliberately destroying the cemetery, sparking outrage from the Armenian diaspora and international community. In response, UNESCO designated the site as a World Heritage site in 2008, recognizing its cultural significance and calling for its protection. Vazken S. Ghougassian, writing in Encyclopædia Iranica, described the cemetery as the "until the end of the 20th century the most visible material evidence for Julfa’s glorious Armenian past."

== See also ==
- Armenian cemetery in Julfa
