= Deportation of Armenians =

Deportation of Armenians may refer to:

- The Great Surgun, which involved the deportation of Armenians from Iranian Armenia to New Julfa in the early 17th century
- The Armenian genocide, from 1915 to 1918
  - Deportation of Armenian intellectuals on 24 April 1915
  - Deportation of Armenians from Crimea
  - Death marches of Armenians from Western Armenia to the Syrian deserts.
- The deportation of Armenians from Nagorno-Karabakh and Azerbaijan as part of the Nagorno-Karabakh conflict
  - Baku pogrom (1990)
  - Operation Ring (1991)
  - Expulsion of Nagorno-Karabakh Armenians (2023)
