= Pomploz Church (Julfa) =

Armenian church in Nakhchivan, Azerbaijan

- Պոմբլոզի ժամ; Հովվի եկեղեցի
- Pomploz Church
- Location: Gülüstan, Nakhchivan
- Country: Azerbaijan
- Denomination: Armenian Apostolic Church

History
- Founded: 12-13th centuries

Architecture
- Demolished: 1997–2003

Pomploz Church was an Armenian church located near the village of Gulustan (Julfa District) of the Nakhchivan Autonomous Republic of Azerbaijan. The church was located on a hill near the banks of the Araxes river, approximately 300m northwest of the main caravanserai in Old Julfa.

== History ==
The church was founded in 12th or 13th century and was restored in the 15th or 16th century. The church was still standing monument in the 1980s.

== Architecture ==
Pomploz Church was a single-naved domed structure with a semi-circular apse and entrance in the west. There were Armenian inscriptions on its western and northern facades.

== Destruction ==
The church was still extant in the 1980s and it was destroyed at some point between 1997 and September 23, 2003, as documented by Caucasus Heritage Watch.
