= Gülüstan, Nakhchivan =

Gülüstan
- Village
- Location within Azerbaijan
- Coordinates: 38°59′00″N 45°35′22″E
- Country: Azerbaijan
- Autonomous republic: Nakhchivan

Population (2005)
  - Total: 482
- Time zone: UTC+4 (AZT)

Gülüstan (Armenian: Ջուղա, romanized: Jugha) is a village and municipality in the Julfa District of Nakhchivan, Azerbaijan. It is located 5 km in the north-west from the district center, on the right bank of the Aras River.

The modern site of Gülüstan was originally the location of a district of the city of Julfa. The village was called Cuğa until 1999, derived from the Armenian name of the city. During the First Nagorno-Karabakh War, the Armenian population of the village was ethnically cleansed.

Its current population is busy with farming and animal husbandry. There is a secondary school, a cultural house, two libraries, a communication center, and a medical center in the village. It has a population of 482.

== Armenian presence ==
Primary sources indicate that between 1604 and 1605, around 250,000 to 300,000 Armenians were involuntarily relocated from the region, and a significant number lost their lives while making an attempt to cross the Arax River. The majority of these Armenians were ultimately resettled in Iranian Azerbaijan, alongside Armenians who had already settled there. Some were also relocated to the Mazandaran region, as well as the cities of Sultanieh, Qazvin, Mashhad, Hamadan, Arak, and Shiraz. Wealthy Armenians from Julfa were specifically transported to the Safavid capital of Esfahan, where they were given special treatment and experienced less hardship during their migration. The Julfa community was settled on the banks of the Zayandeh Rud, and a new town called New Julfa (Nor Jugha) was built for them in 1605. The city was a center of Armenian culture, housing a fortress, a massive bridge, and the largest medieval Armenian cemetery. After the population removals, the site was degraded to the status of a small village, with a population of a few hundred, mostly Armenian residents. The Armenian cemetery, the only significant vestige of the greater city of Julfa left in the village, was destroyed between 1998 and 2006 in what was characterised as an act of cultural genocide, akin to the destruction of the Buddhas of Bamiyan.

== Culture and sights ==
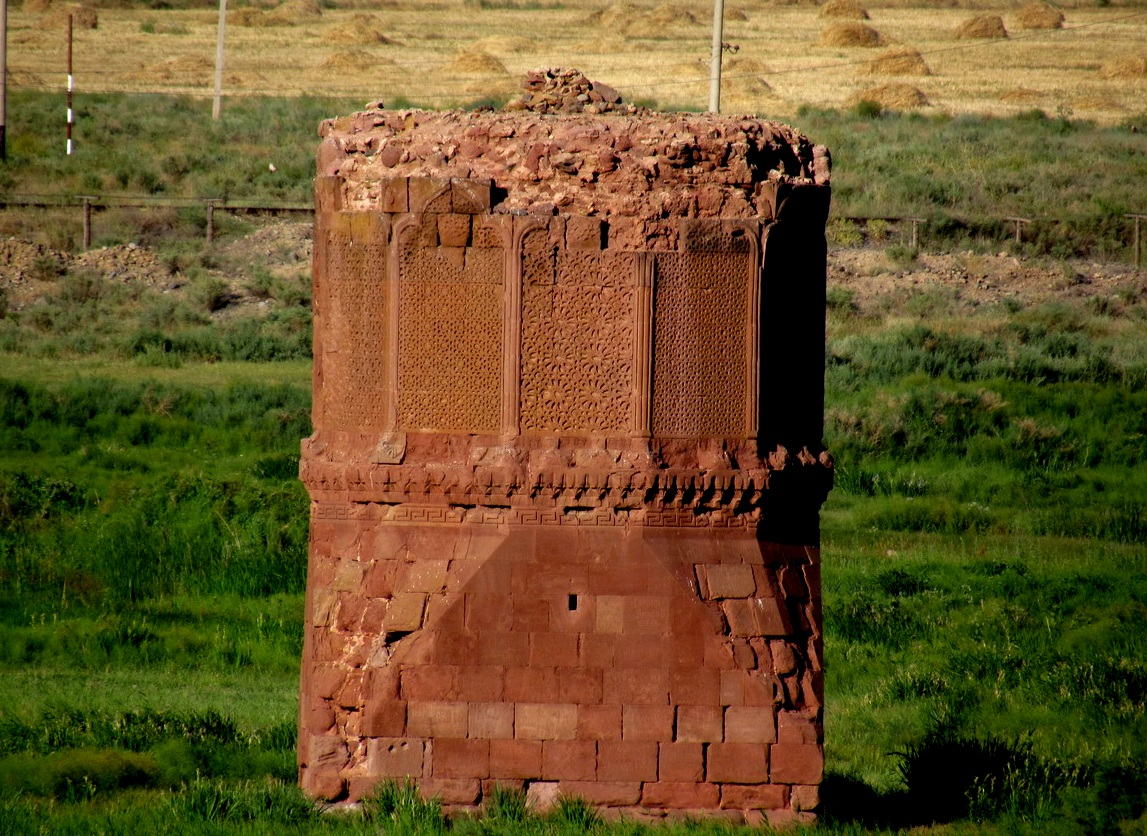
Medieval Gulustan tomb close to the village

=== Gulustan Tomb ===
The architectural monument of the Middle Ages near the village of Gulustan, Julfa region. The Gulustan tomb which was built under the influence of the Momuna Khatun Tomb at the beginning of the 13th century belongs to the tower shaped tombs group of Azerbaijan. The twelve-faced body of the tomb was built of red sandstone, but the pedestal with the original structure (the corners are in form of the projected cubic) was built of the hewed stone. Unlike other tombs of Azerbaijan the vault of the Gulustan tomb is situated on the land surface (in the pedestal). The pedestal looks like the projected pyramid outside but inside is cylindrical. The projected pyramid which is square in plan (6.6 x 6.6 cm) turns to the right twelve-faced in the upper part outside and twelve-faced upper chamber is situated on it. The upper tent cover of the tomb was completely destroyed. In accordance with this to identify if the cover looked like a pyramid or conic form is very difficult. The tomb surfaces were decorated with the carving geometric ornaments and were framed with the decorative arches. Each face of the tower is completed with the arches, by means of salient forking. Inside the recesses were covered with the neat designs as it exists in the tombs of Ajami Nakhchivani. When glanced at the designs in all twelve faces, it becomes clear that the succession existing here is completed by means of three kinds of geometric designs repeatedly. The joined part of the body with the stand, also the place passing to the dome, were encircled with the carved enforcement of stalactite shape. The assembling of the ornaments with other decorative elements and their connection give a rather more vivid and elastic image to the monument. The space structure of the Gulustan tomb is the unexampled specimen on the basis of a square from the circle, from cubic capacity to conic and thus the artistic – technical solution of the symmetric systems pass to one another. As the widespread area of these kinds of tombs is Anadolu, it is possible to regard the Gulustan tomb as the key indicator of the background unity of the central Azerbaijan and the tombs of the Anadolu Saljug. According to the symmetry between the architectural forms, cut and neatness of the designs the Gulustan tomb is differed from these stone tombs for its advantage.

=== Jugha ===
Jugha is the settlement of the Middle Ages in the north-west from the Gulustan village. It is limited by the high mountain range in the north, by the Araz River in the south, and by the ancient cemetery in the west. The settlement in the form of narrow stripe on the left bank of the Araz River is lies towards from west to east. The residential buildings were completely destroyed in the area, remains of the building (especially burned bricks) were scattered in the around. From here were discovered the products of the glazed and unglazed ceramic in the pink colored decorated with the ornaments of various compositions, the copper coins and other examples of the material culture. There exist the archaeological monument of the Middle Ages in the west end of the place of residence. Its area is about 10 hectares. The grave monuments were from different periods, consists of the ram stones, stone graves, the chest and head stones made in the form of a rectangular prism. On the gravestones meets images of various subjects (especially the image of a winged dragon). According to the findings and grave monuments, it is assumed that the main activity period of the Cuğa belongs to the 11-17 centuries. There are also the grave monuments of the last period in the area.

=== Mineral water ===
The Gulustan mineral water is in the bed of the Alinjachay (Alinja River), at 2.5 km distance from the village of Gulustan, in the territory of Julfa region. The mineral water is extracted from the well of 135 m in depth which was drilled in 1962. The water is carbonic aerated, less mineralized, hyrocarbonated with natrium-calcium-magnezium. It is of the same type of “Kislovodsk” (Russia) and “Sirab” (Babak) waters. It is used in treatment of the gastroenteric diseases.

== See also ==
- Armenians of Julfa
