= St. Astvatsatsin Monastery (Norashen) =

Armenian monastery in Nakhchivan, Azerbaijan

- Սուրբ Աստվածածին վանք
- St. Astvatsatsin Monastery
- Location: Göydərə
- Country: Azerbaijan
- Denomination: Armenian Apostolic Church

History
- Status: Destroyed
- Founded: 951

Architecture
- Style: Basilica
- Demolished: 1997–2001

St. Astvatsatsin Monastery was an Armenian monastery in Goydere (formerly Norashen) village (Julfa District) of the Nakhchivan Autonomous Republic of Azerbaijan. The monastery was located in the northwestern district of the village.

== History ==
The monastery was founded 951 and renovated in the 17th century.

== Architecture ==
St. Astvatsatsin was a basilica structure with nave and two aisles, spacious apse, two vestries, and small bell tower. There were traces of wall paintings, and reliefs depicting the four evangelists and the Mother of God, as well as Armenian inscriptions on the western, southern, and eastern facades.

== Destruction ==
The monastery was still standing in the later Soviet period. However, it had been razed to its foundations by October 7, 2001, as documented by investigation of the Caucasus Heritage Watch. By August 11, 2016, the foundations had also been cleared from the site.
