= Gulustan Mausoleum =

Heritage site in Julfa, Afghanistan

Coordinates: 38.9714°N 45.5875°E

- Gülüstan türbəsi
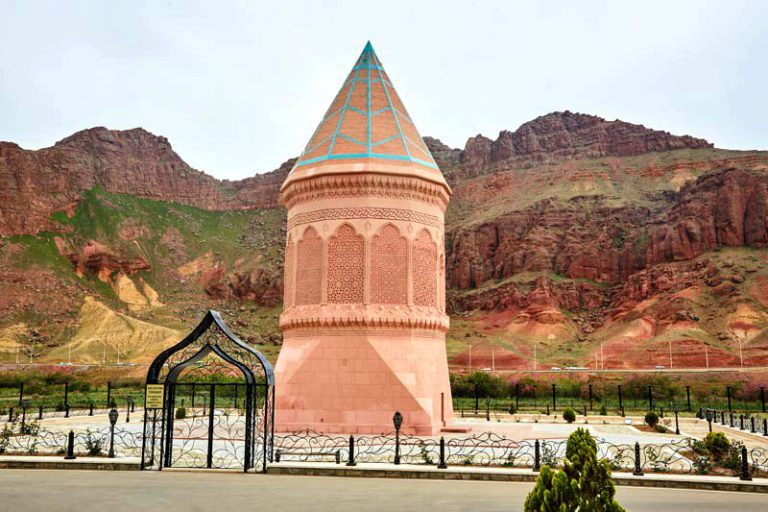
- Interactive map of Gulustan Mausoleum
- Location: Julfa, Azerbaijan
- Type: Mausoleum
- Beginning date: 13th century

The Gulustan Mausoleum (Azerbaijani: Gülüstan türbəsi), also known as the Dasht ("fields") Mausoleum, and the Vardut (Armenian for "roses") Mausoleum after the site's original name, is a medieval sepulchral monument in Azerbaijan's Nakhchivan region. The settlement of Vardut was destroyed when its Armenian population, like that of nearby Jugha, was forcefully deported to Isfahan in 1605.

The mausoleums of Nakhichevan were nominated for List of World Heritage Sites, UNESCO in 1998 — president of Azerbaijan Committee of ICOMOS—International Council on Monuments and Sites.

== Architecture ==
The mausoleum was built in the 12th-13th centuries. Gulustan means "heavenly garden" because the mausoleum is located in a green hollow, not far from the Aras River and this place is called rose garden.

The mausoleum was built of red sandstone. This construction has 12 facets and was covered with rich and complex, but immensely fine, geometric ornaments.

The mausoleum stands on a great pedestal which looks like dressed triangle feathers. Once, the mausoleum was crowned with a pyramid-cupola. It hasn't remained up to this day, but all remaining parts are preserved perfectly.

All sides of the mausoleum were decorated with ornaments and inscriptions. Upper part of the mausoleum was decorated with ornamental nettings. There is an aperture leading to the mausoleum in the northern part. It leads to the underground part of the mausoleum. It is poorly illuminated by small windows like loopholes. Inner part of the mausoleum hasn't any ornamentation.
