= Göydərə =

Village and municipality in Nakhchivan, Azerbaijan

- Municipality
- Location within Azerbaijan
- Coordinates: 39°10′13″N 45°40′30″E
- Country: Azerbaijan
- Autonomous republic: Nakhchivan
- District: Julfa

Population (2005)
  - Total: 1,332
- Time zone: UTC+4 (AZT)

Göydərə (also Goydere and Goydara), formerly Norashen (Armenian: Նորաշեն, romanized: Norašen), is a village and municipality in the Julfa District of Nakhchivan, Azerbaijan. It is located 32 km in the north from the district center, on the right bank of the Alinjachay River, on the slope of the Zangezur ridge. Its population is busy with vine-growing, farming and animal husbandry.

There are a secondary school, a cultural house, a library, a communication center, a pensioners' club and a medical center in the village. It has a population of 1,332.

== History ==
Based on surviving manuscripts, Norashen ("New village" in Armenian), was an important center for scriptorium production from the 14th to the 18th century. In the village was an Armenian church, named Surp Astvatsatsin, a domeless basilica that dated back to the 9th or 10th century. It survived at least into the 1990s but is presumed to have been demolished sometime after that. In 1992 the name of the village was changed to Goydara ("Green valley").

== Historical and archaeological monuments ==
=== Goydara Necropolis ===
Goydara Necropolis - an Armenian cemetery from the Middle Ages, is located to the north-west of Goydara village, on the slope of a mountain. It is surrounded in the west with the valley, in the north with the mountain range, and in the east and south with the Goydara village. The gravestones include khatchkars, ram-shaped stones like those at the Julfa cemetery, and simpler rectangular chest-shaped stones. Exploration research works were carried out in 1990–91. All of the graves are in the east and west direction. The gravestones were kept. Stones for the chest on the graves are in a square prismatic shape. On the sides of some of the graves are relief carvings, including rifles and swords. There is the sign of an arrow on one of the ram stones. It is supposed that the monument belongs to the 13–17 centuries.

=== St. Astvatsatsin Monastery ===
St. Astvatsatsin Monastery was a 10th-century Armenian monastery located in the center of the village and was destroyed at some point between 1997 and 2001.

== See also ==
- St. Astvatsatsin Monastery (Norashen)
