= Göydərə, Gobustan =

Göydərə
- Municipality
- Location within Azerbaijan
- Coordinates: 40°25′06″N 48°56′36″E
- Country: Azerbaijan
- Rayon: Gobustan

Population
  - Total: 452
- Time zone: UTC+4 (AZT)
  - Summer (DST): UTC+5 (AZT)

Göydərə (also Goydere and Goydara) is a village and municipality in the Gobustan Rayon of Azerbaijan. It has a population of 452.
