= Julfa, Azerbaijan (city) =

City in Nakhchivan Autonomous Republic of Azerbaijan

Julfa Culfa Ջուղա Jugha
- City and Municipality
- Culfa
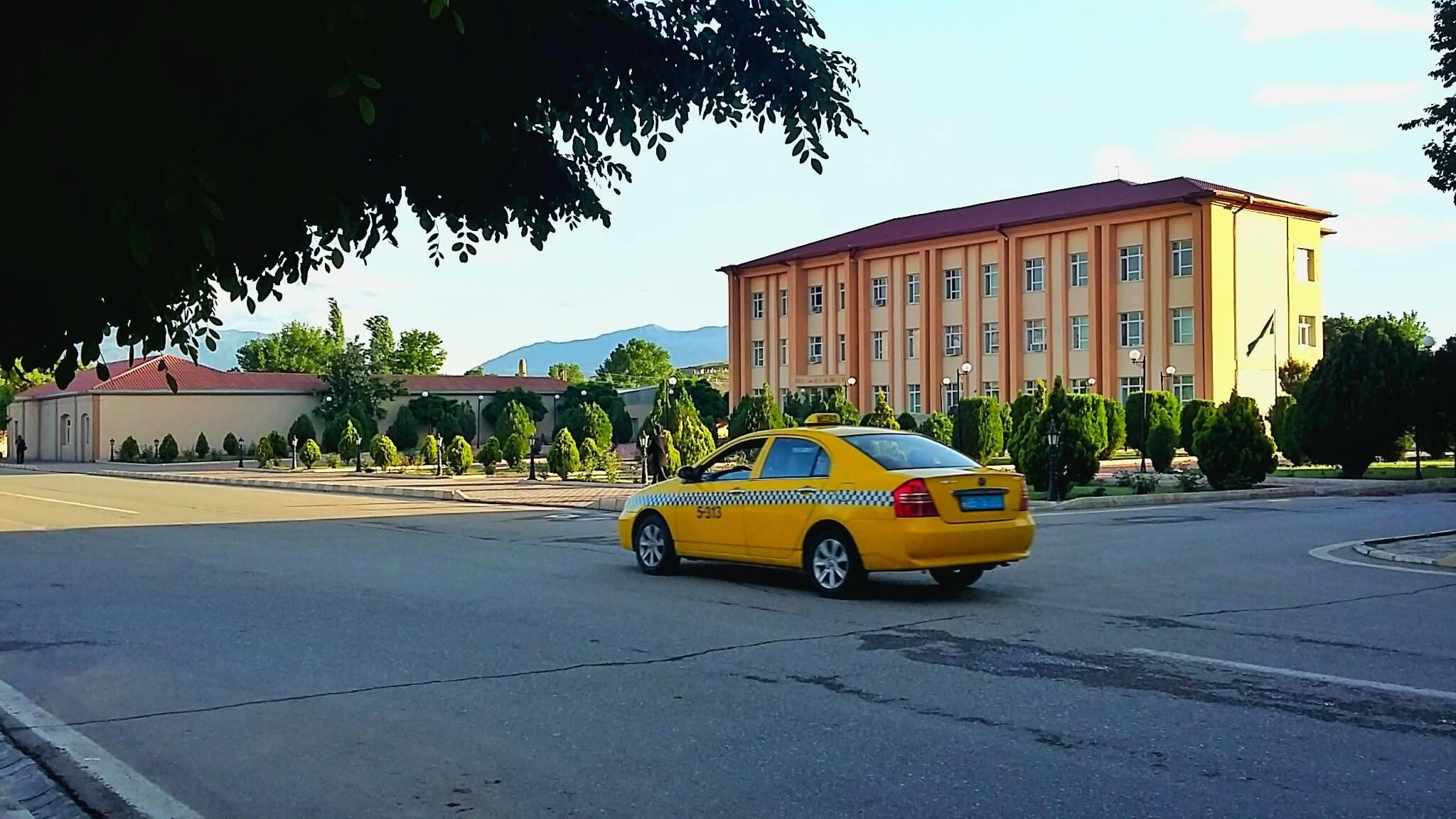
- Julfa City

- Location within Azerbaijan
- Coordinates: 38°57′21″N 45°37′51″E
- Country: Azerbaijan
- Autonomous republic: Nakhchivan
- District: Julfa
- Elevation: 715 m (2,346 ft)

Population (2011)
  - Total: 12,500
- Time zone: UTC+4 (AZT)

Julfa (Azerbaijani: Culfa), (Note: Also referred to as Djulfa, Dzhul’fa, Jolfa, Dzhulfa, Džulfa, Jolfā, Jolfā-ye Nakhjavān (Persian: جلفای نخجوان)) formerly Jugha (Armenian: Ջուղա, also transliterated as Djugha), is a city and the capital of the Julfa District of the Nakhchivan Autonomous Republic of Azerbaijan.

Julfa, an old Azerbaijan city, is separated by the Aras River from its namesake, the town of Jolfa on the Iranian side of the border. The two towns are linked by a road bridge and a railway bridge.

Both Azerbaijan's absolute minimum temperature (−33 °C or −27.4 °F) and the absolute maximum temperature (46 °C or 114.8 °F) were observed in Julfa (and also in Ordubad).

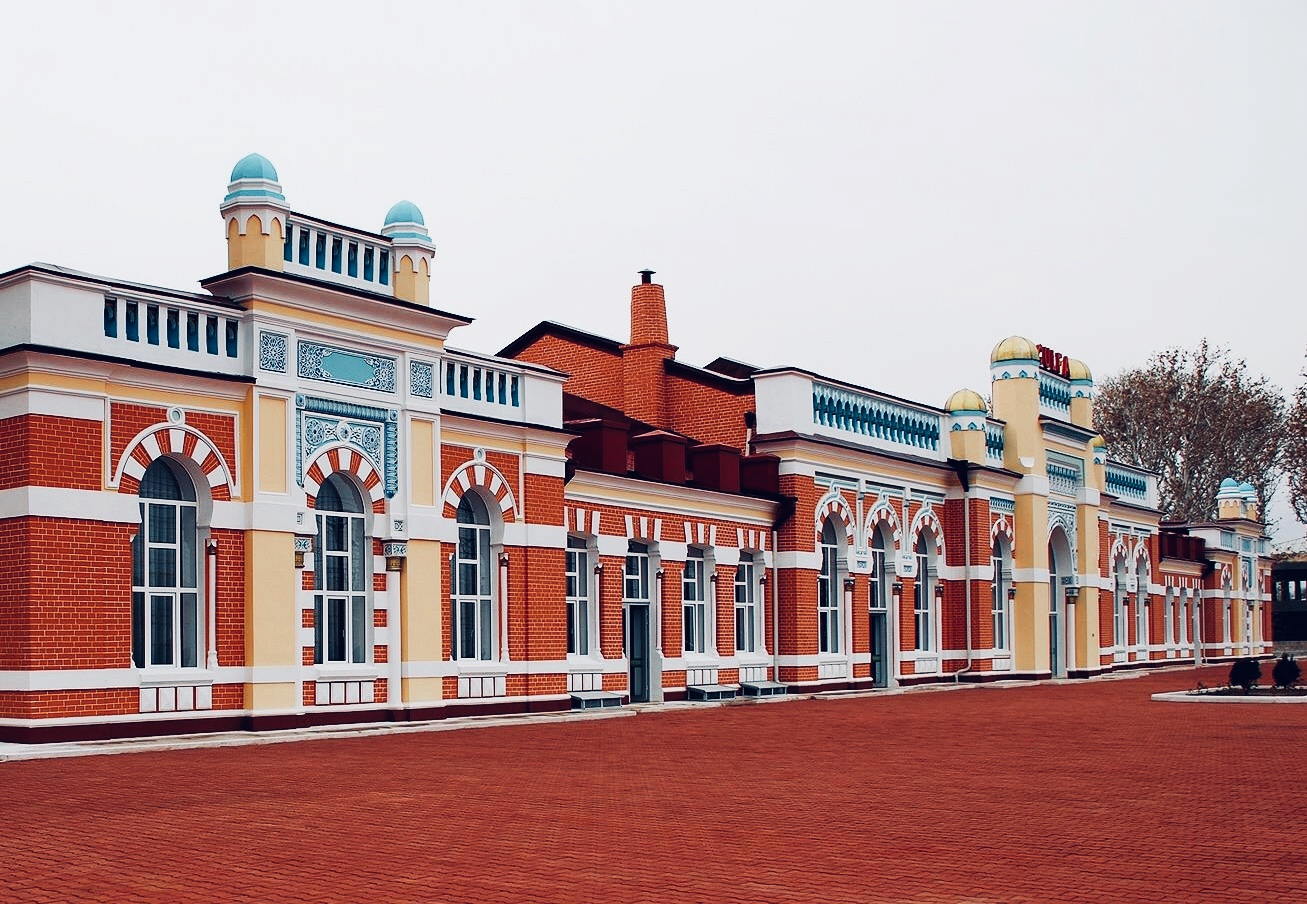
Julfa Rail Station

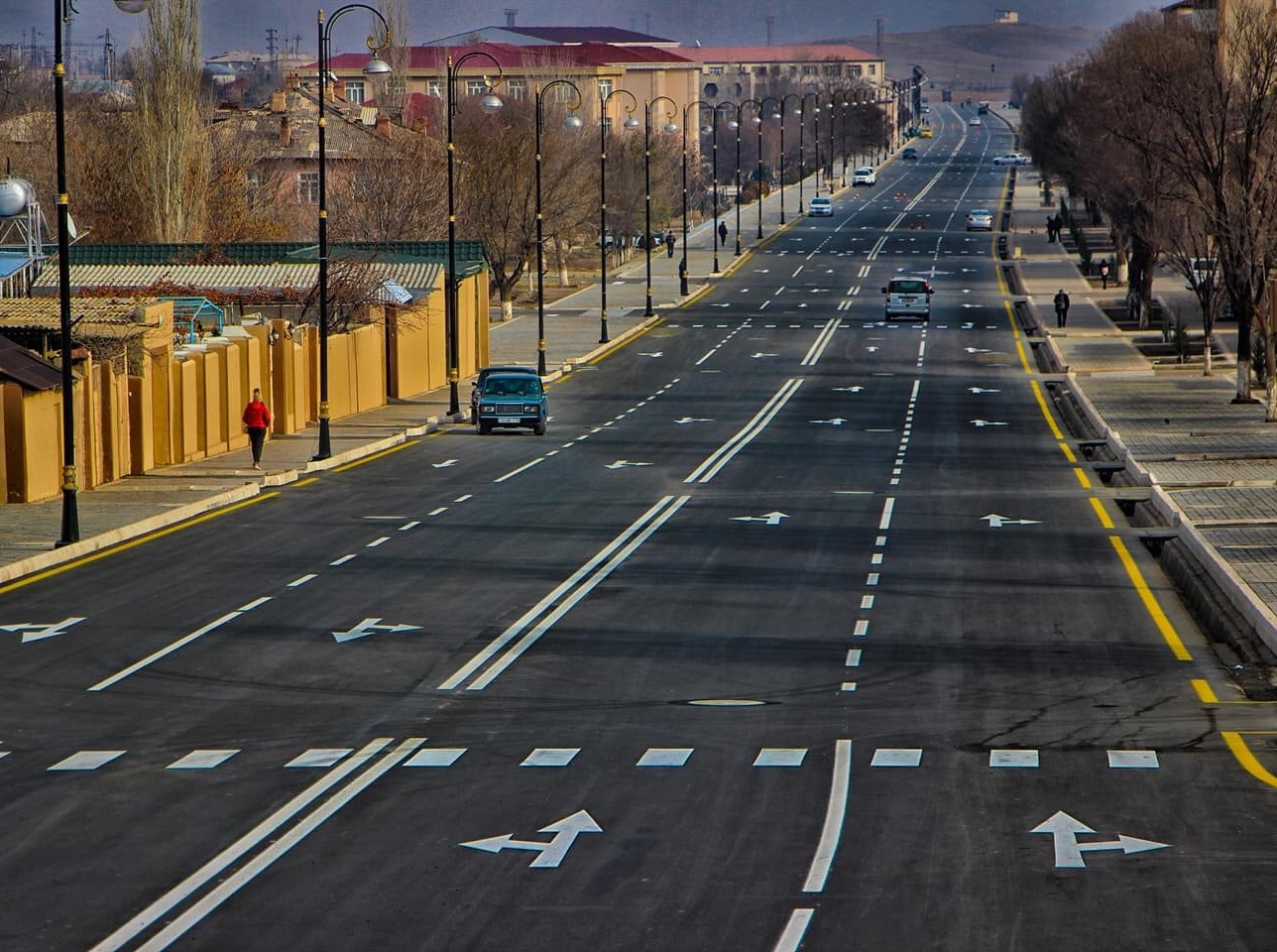
Julfa Road

== History ==
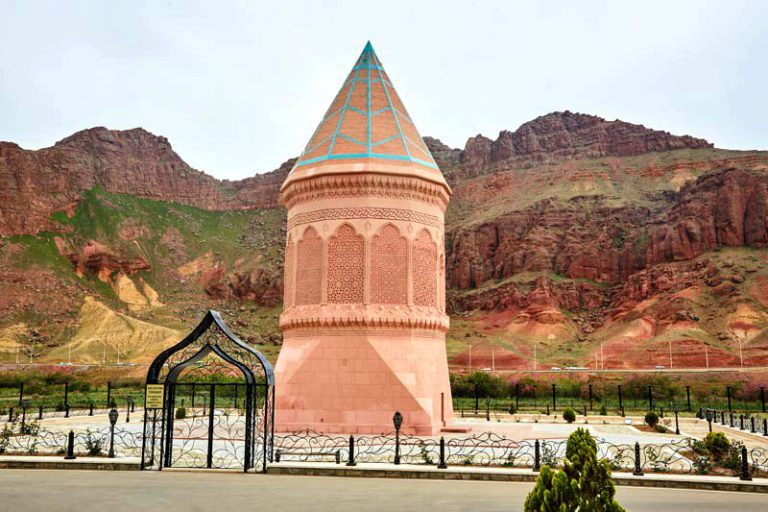
View of Gulustan Mausoleum

The city is known as Jugha (Armenian: Ջուղա) (Note: Ջուղայ using pre-reform spelling. Sometimes transliterated as Djugha) in Armenian. The modern-day town of Julfa is located a few kilometers east of the ruins of the historical settlement of Julfa/Jugha, which are situated on a rocky strip of land in between the left bank of the Aras and a steep mountain range. The medieval Armenian historian Movses Khorenatsi wrote that Julfa was founded by the king of Armenia, Tigranes, (Note: Likely a combination of actual kings of Armenia Tigranes I and/or Tigranes II with elements of legend) using prisoners he took after defeating the Median king Astyages (Azhdahak in the Armenian tradition). The 18th-century Armenian Catholicos Lazar I wrote that some of the inhabitants of the medieval Armenian capital of Ani migrated to Julfa after the former's destruction, leading to the misconception that Julfa was founded after the destruction of Ani.

Existing as a village in the early Middle Ages, it grew into a town between the 10th and 13th centuries, with a population that was almost entirely Armenian. For a time, Julfa was one of the most important settlements in medieval Armenia. It became prosperous in the 15th and 16th centuries due to the role it played in international trade, as it was located along the ancient trade routes from Persia, the Middle East, South-East Asia, India, to Russia, the Mediterranean, and North-West Europe. An English preacher who passed through the town in 1600 estimated its population to be about 10,000 people. Unlike other Armenian cities, Julfa does not seem to have experienced significant hardship before its destruction and the deportation of its population in 1605.

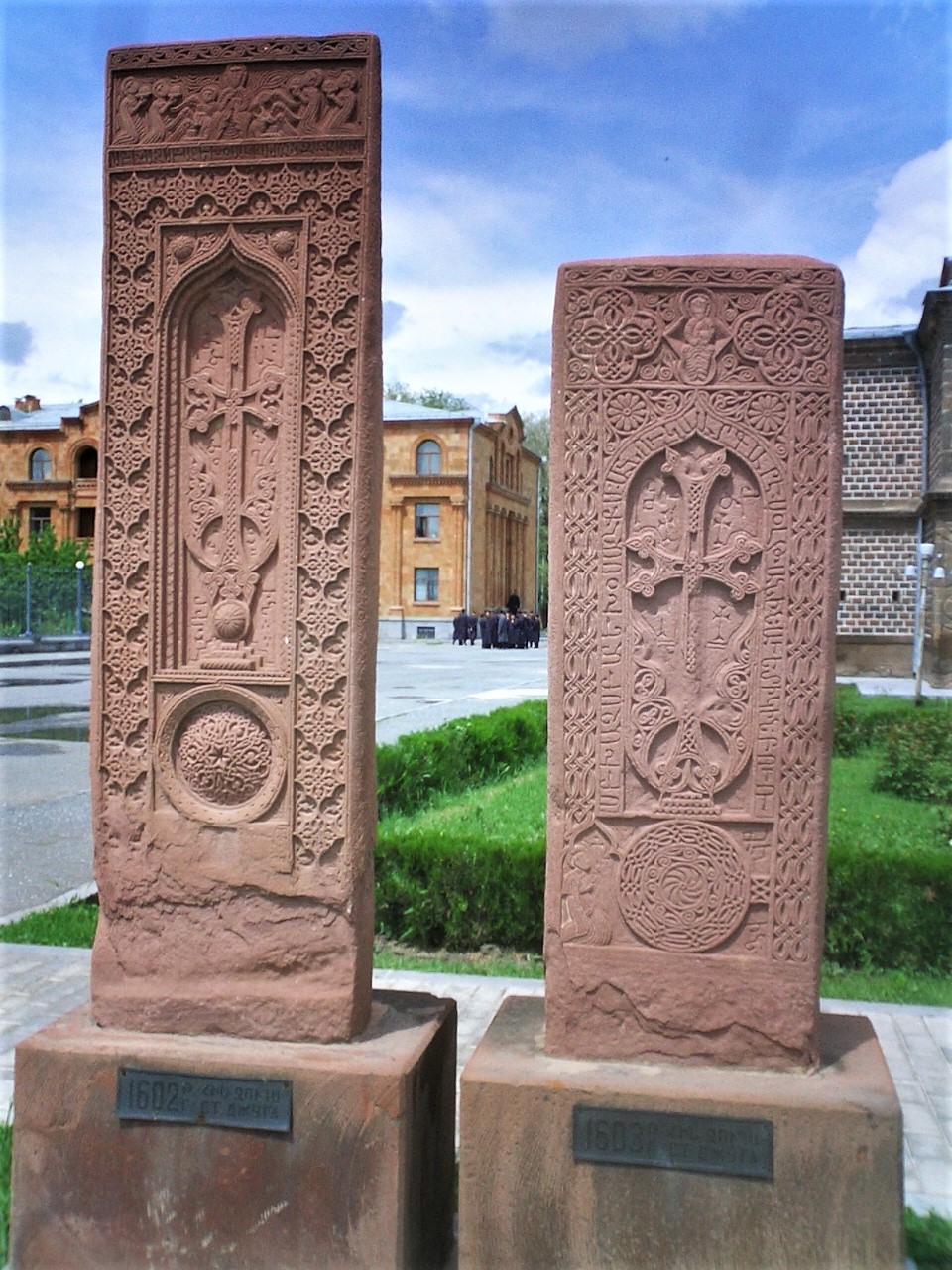
Two Julfa khachkars c. 1602 and 1503, removed from the Julfa graveyard before its destruction and now on display within the precincts of Etchmiadzin, Armenia.

In 1603, during the Ottoman–Safavid war (1603–1612), Abbas the Great, the emperor of Safavid Iran, retook Julfa from the Ottoman Empire and was seen as a liberator by its Armenian population. However, Abbas realized he could not defend the territory along the Aras from incursions by the Ottomans. His solution was to evacuate the region, undertaking a scorched earth policy to prevent its wealth and population from falling into Ottoman hands. In October 1605, the Shah issued a proclamation declaring that the entire population of Julfa must leave their homes and move deep into the Empire.

According to 17th-century chronicler Arakel of Tabriz, the proclamation stated that they had three days to leave or face being massacred. Another eyewitness, Augustus Badjetsi, Bishop of Nakhijevan, wrote:

[The Persians entered the Armenian villages] like thunder from the sky... We left houses full of goods, the herds in the fields ... the entire population was turned out of their land ... how many were pushed out at the point of swords and spears ... their moans and groans reaching the skies.

About three thousand families were deported from Julfa, and many drowned while attempting to cross the Aras. After the deportation was completed, the town was destroyed by fire to prevent the inhabitants from returning. The deportees were taken to an area near Esfahan, where a new town, New Julfa, was established. New Julfa is now a district of Esfahan and is the modern-day centre of the Iranian Armenian population in Iran.

In 1606, the second deportation was made of inhabitants that had escaped the first deportation.

In the 17th century, a small settlement was founded amid the ruins of the destroyed town, which, in 1747, became part of the Nakhichevan Khanate within Qajar Iran. At the start of the 19th century, this settlement moved to a new location three kilometres to the east of the historic town, at the point where the Alinja River flows into the Aras. Following the Russo-Persian War of 1826–28 and the resulting Treaty of Turkmenchay in 1828, the village of Julfa became the official border crossing between Persia and Russia as the former was forced to cede its last remaining Caucasian territories, containing state customs services, a garrison and post office.

The town became part of the Armenian Oblast from 1840 to 1847 and then part of the Erivan Governorate of the Russian Empire between 1847 and 1917. According to the Russian Empire census in 1897 Julfa was a village with a population of 763, of which 751 were Armenians. Following the Russian Revolution, between 1918 and 1920, Julfa was the subject of a territorial dispute between the First Republic of Armenia and the Azerbaijan Democratic Republic. As a result of the Treaty of Kars, it became part of the Nakhichevan Autonomous Soviet Socialist Republic under the Azerbaijan Soviet Socialist Republic.

The Persian Corridor ran through Julfa during World War II, bringing supplies from other Allied nations into the Soviet Union.

During the conflict between Azerbaijan and Armenia over the status of Nagorno-Karabakh from 1988 to 1994, the remaining Armenian population (which had been slowly declining due to emigration during the Soviet era) was either evacuated or was forcibly deported to Armenia.

== Old Julfa and Julfa cemetery ==
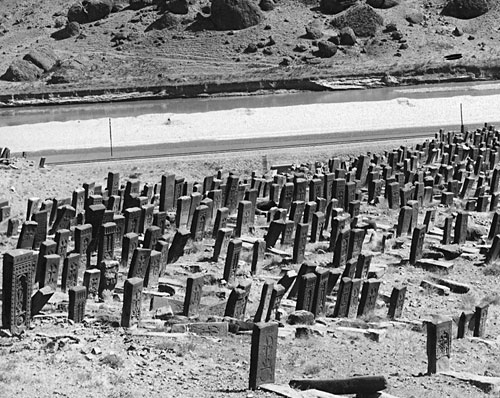
A photograph taken in 1915 by Aram Vruyr showing part of the medieval Armenian cemetery of Julfa.

At the beginning of the 20th century, the remains of the medieval settlement included a massive ruined bridge, two large caravanserais (one on the Iranian side of the border), the walls of a fortress, and several Armenian churches. The most notable remnant from old Julfa was the town's huge Armenian cemetery, located to the west of the ruined city, on three low hills divided by small valleys. It contained the largest surviving collection of Armenian khachkar tombstones, most dating to the 15th and 16th centuries. One of the earliest references to the site is that of the French Jesuit missionary Alexander de Rhodes, who wrote that during his visit in 1648 he saw over ten thousand tombstones. However, a large number of the stones were destroyed during the construction of the railway line to Julfa early in the 20th century.

In the 1970s, according to Argam Aivazian's investigations at the cemetery from 1971 to 1973, there were, either upright or fallen, 462 khachkars on the first cemetery hill, 1,672 khachkars on the second, and 573 on the third. In addition to these khachkars, there were in the same cemetery more than a thousand ram-shaped, gabled, or flat tombstones. An additional 250 khachkars were counted in the cemetery of the nearby Amenaprkich monastery and in other parts of the city site. The number of khachkars and ram-shaped tombstones buried in the earth or in fragments, in the main cemetery and elsewhere, was estimated to be more than 1,400.

=== Destruction ===
Between 1998 and 2006 the entire cemetery was destroyed. The various stages of the destruction process were documented by photographic and video evidence taken from the Iranian side of the border. However, the government and state officials of Azerbaijan have denied that any destruction has taken place, stating that "an Armenian cemetery never existed on the site and that Armenians have never lived in Julfa". Azerbaijan has, to date, refused to allow investigators access to the site. The European Parliament formally called on Azerbaijan to stop the demolition as a breach of the UNESCO World Heritage Convention. According to its resolution regarding cultural monuments in the South Caucasus, the European Parliament "condemns strongly the destruction of the Julfa cemetery as well as the destruction of all sites of historical importance that has taken place on Armenian or Azerbaijani territory, and condemns any such action that seeks to destroy cultural heritage." In 2006, Azerbaijan barred the European Parliament from inspecting and examining the ancient site, stating that by passing the previously mentioned resolution the Parliament had committed a hostile act against Azerbaijan. The Institute for War and Peace Reporting reported on April 19, 2006, that "there is nothing left of the celebrated stone crosses of Jugha."

After several more postponed visits, a renewed attempt was planned by Parliamentary Assembly of the Council of Europe (PACE) inspectors for August 29 - September 6, 2007, led by British MP Edward O'Hara. As well as Nakhchivan, the delegation would visit Baku, Yerevan, Tbilisi, and Nagorno Karabakh. The inspectors planned to visit Nagorno Karabakh via Armenia, and had arranged transport to facilitate this. However, on August 28, the head of the Azerbaijani delegation to PACE released a demand that the inspectors must enter Nagorno Karabakh via Azerbaijan. On August 29, PACE Secretary General Mateo Sorinas announced that the visit had to be cancelled because of the difficulty in accessing Nagorno Karabagh using the route required by Azerbaijan. The Ministry of Foreign Affairs in Armenia issued a statement saying that Azerbaijan had stopped the visit "due solely to their intent to veil the demolition of Armenian monuments in Nakhijevan".

== In culture ==
The sudden and dramatic downfall of Old Julfa in the 17th century made a deep and lasting impression on Armenian society and culture. During the 19th century, poets such Hovhannes Tumanyan and historians such as Ghevond Alishan produced works based on the event. The emotions raised as a result of the destruction of the graveyard in 2006 indicates that the fate of Julfa still resonates within contemporary Armenian society.. Indigenous Armenians were forcibly deported from Julfa to modern-day Iran during Shah Abbas' time. Many settled in Esfahan, forming the new neighbourhood, Nor Julfa or Nor Jugha. Families include the Ohanian family.

== Notable people ==
- Aramais Aghamalian was an Armenian-Iranian film director and screenwriter.
