= Great Surgun =

Mass forced deportation of Armenians in 17th century

The Great Surgun (Armenian: Մեծ սուրգուն, the Great Exile) was the forced deportation of the population (mainly Armenians) from Eastern Armenia to the territory of the central and northern parts of Safavid Iran, which was carried out in 1604–1605 by the order of Shah Abbas the Great during the Ottoman–Safavid War (1603–1618).

Among the deported population (about 350,000 people), the largest number were Armenians. According to various estimates, the number of expelled Armenians ranged from 250,000 to 300,000 people.

During this time Armenian cities and villages were plundered and destroyed. Many Armenians were brutally killed, subjected to violence or died on the way, less than half survived during the march.

The deportation changed the ethnic demographic picture of the Armenian Highlands radically, greatly decreasing the percentage of Armenian population of the region. Mass deportation of Armenians made them a minority in Nakhichevan (part of the present-day Nakhchivan Autonomous Republic of Azerbaijan), and also led to significant increase in the percentage of Muslims (Turks and Kurds) in other historical regions, including the Artsakh region (currently better known as Nagorno-Karabakh).

== Background ==
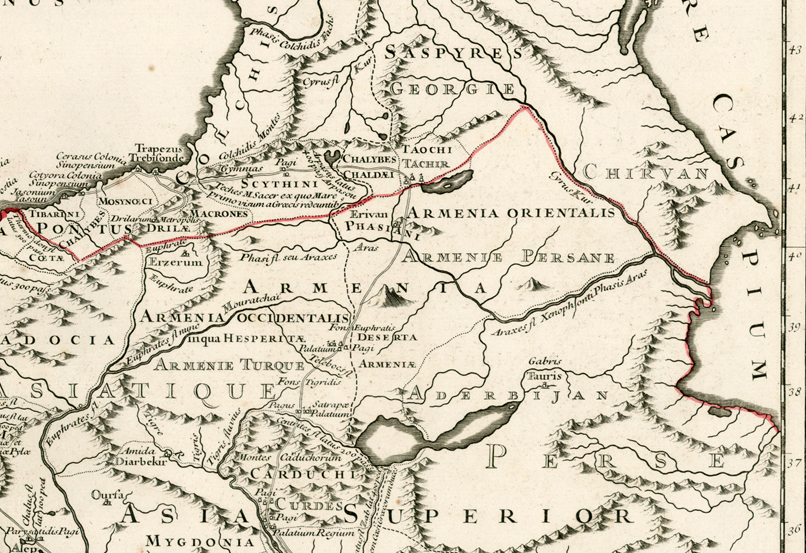
Armenia on a 1740 map

For centuries, Armenia was subjected to continuous military invasions and devastating raids. The first Arab conquests in the region began in the 40s of the 7th century. Later, at the beginning of the 11th century, Oguz-Turkmen tribes from Central Asia started their raids. At the same time, as a result of regular attacks by Byzantium on the one hand, and the Seljuks on the other, the Armenian Vaspurakan and Ani kingdoms were liquidated, and by the 70s of the 11th century (Battle of Manzikert), the Seljuks extended their influence to almost the entire territory of Armenia, which over time dealt a strong blow to the Armenian ethnos in the region. By the 13th century, the territory of Armenia was subjected to numerous invasions of Muslim nomadic tribes.

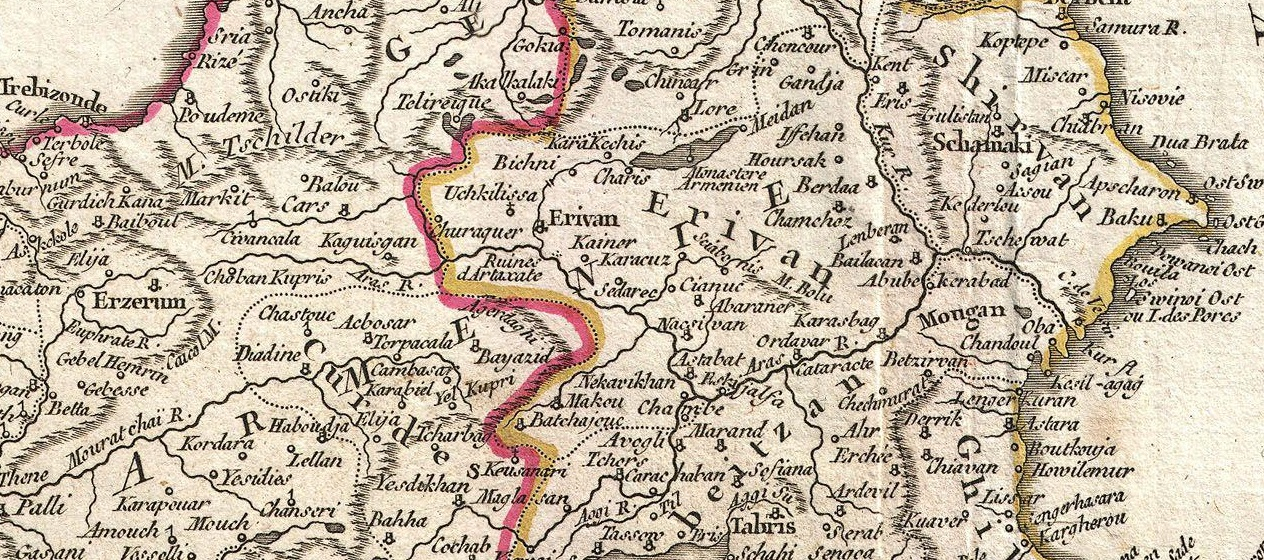
Robert de Vaugondy, 1753 map - Persian and Ottoman empires: Armenia is shown divided between them as Persian (Eastern) and Ottoman (Western) Armenia.

Already in the Seljuk era, the centuries-old process of marginalisation of the Armenian population by alien Turkic nomads in the region had begun, which intensified especially after the invasions of Tamerlane. During the period of Mongol rule, Armenia was plundered and ravaged, and starting from the end of the 13th century, Ghazan Khan subjected the Armenian population, especially from Nakhichevan and nearby territories, to harsh persecution. In 1385, Tokhtamysh Khan took tens of thousands of Armenians from Artsakh, Syunik and Parskahayk into captivity. The Mongol rule also intensified the demographic changes that had begun under the Seljuk rule - the Muslim population increased, while the Armenian population decreased. Numerous nomadic tribes for a number of centuries moved in and settled in fertile areas with extensive pastures, and their tribal rulers gradually appropriated the property of Armenian landowners, oppressing them. This led to the forced mass emigration of Armenians to safer places.

William of Rubruck, who visited Nakhichevan after the Mongol invasion, writes:

[the city] was firstly erected and adorned as a most beautiful city of a certain great kingdom; but the Tatars turned it almost into a desert. Before, there were eight hundred Armenian churches, and now only two small ones, and the rest were destroyed by the Saracens.

Since the 16th century, continuous Turkish-Persian wars, which were fought for control over its territory, caused great damage to Armenia. Being divided between two warring empires, for most of the 16th century the country served as their battlefield and was devastated by the scorched earth policy pursued by both the Ottomans and the Safavids. According to the peace treaty that ended the first Turkish-Persian war (1514–1555), the Ottoman Empire expanded its possessions, annexing territories from Sivas to Erzerum, Alashkert, Diyarbekir, Van, Kahramanmarash and Mosul, and Safavid Persia - at the expense of the territory of the Caucasus and Transcaucasia.

In 1578, a new Turkish-Persian war (1578–1590) began. The Ottoman army and the 100,000-strong army of the Crimean Khan raided Eastern Armenia. Devastating campaigns in Transcaucasia continued until the beginning of 1590. A significant part of the local population was killed, driven into slavery or fled (60,000 people were driven into slavery from Erivan alone).

Armenian historian of the 16th century Yovanisik Caretsi writes about these events:

... a certain commander, named Lala, set out with many soldiers, reached the Ararat region and filled the Armenians and Muslims, numbering 60 thousand, and drove them forward to the land of the Romans [Eastern Roman Empire].

As a result of the war, according to the Treaty of Constantinople, Persia was forced to cede Tabriz, Shirvan and some parts of Eastern Armenia, Azerbaijan and Georgia (Kartli and Kakheti kingdoms).

== The mass deportation and its reasons ==
The Shah of Persia, Abbas the Great, who did not accept defeat, wanted to return the territories ceded to the Turks in 1590. He began to reform his army, trained it in the European manner by English experts, and in 1603 started a new war with the Ottoman Empire.

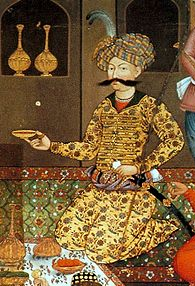
Shah Abbas I the Great

In 1603–1605, the Shah's troops, having defeated the Turks at Sufiyan, captured and once again plundered the cities of Nakhichevan, Tabriz, Julfa and Erivan. Most of the residents of Erivan were forcibly relocated. Since the summer of 1604, the territory of Eastern Armenia was systematically subjected to devastating raids. With regard to the regions of the Ararat Valley bordering the Ottoman Empire, the Shah resorted to the tactics of "scorched earth", the essence of which was the forcible resettlement (devastation of the territory) of all local residents deep into the territory of Persia, along with all their property.

The Shah pursued the goal of depopulating these areas and settling the Armenian population throughout Persia, thereby wishing, on the one hand, to secure his western borders from a potential Ottoman-Armenian conspiracy, and on the other hand, he was guided by the desire to use Armenian artisans and merchants for his commercial purposes.

At the first stage, by the order of the Shah, the gathering of the Armenian population (from Nakhichevan, Julfa, Syunik, Sevan, Lori, Abaran, Shirakavan, Kars, Van, Alashkert and Bayazet) was organized in specially designated places. The Armenians were loyal subjects of their shah and carried out his orders, and having learned about his intentions, they pleaded with him in every possible way to postpone their move because of the imminent onset of winter. However, their requests were ignored by the Shah.

This was followed by destruction of all the remaining property of the Armenian population, so that it could not be taken by the Ottoman troops. Thousands of people perished while crossing the Araks river alone.

Arakel Davrizhetsi, 17th-century Armenian historian, reports:

Shah Abbas did not heed to the pleas of the Armenians. He summoned his nakharars and from among them appointed overseers and guides for the inhabitants of the country, so that each prince with his army would evict and expel the population of one gavar[province]. [The population] of the city of Erivan itself, the Ararat region and individual nearby gavars [was entrusted] to Amirgun Khan.

…

But with the approach of autumn, the Turkish commander ... gathered a large army and launched a fierce attack on King Abbas in the province of Ararat (gavar). When he (Abbas) saw that he could not resist him in battle, he fled from one place to another, and set the country on fire so that there would be no shelter for the Turkish troops, no food, nor food for their cattle. He also ordered his wicked troops to drive the Armenian people to Persia.

…

With fierce blows and with furious haste, they began to devastate from the inhabitants the entire region between the provinces of Shirakuan [Shirakavan] and Kars and the province of Goghtn. On winter days, they dragged vardapets and bishops, priests and parishioners, nobles and commoners from their cloisters and dwellings in villages, cities, monasteries and sketes and drove them at full speed in front of their horses, brandishing their swords, hurrying them, for the enemy, the Turkish army stepped on their heels. Woe and woe to this disaster! Oh suffering, poverty and bitterness! For when people were driven out of their houses, they burned the houses with all their possessions, and the owners, looking back, saw the flames rise up. Then they wept, uttering piercing cries, wailing loudly and throwing dust on their heads. It was not possible to find help, because the Shah's decree was adamant. Then, along the way, they (soldiers) killed some and maimed others, took babies from their mothers' hands and threw them against stones, so that [women] would be easier on the march.

According to Davrizhetsi, the deportation began in August 1604 and culminated in the autumn. The number of the expelled population covered the territory from the mountains of Garni to the mouth of the Araks.

== Consequences and assessments ==
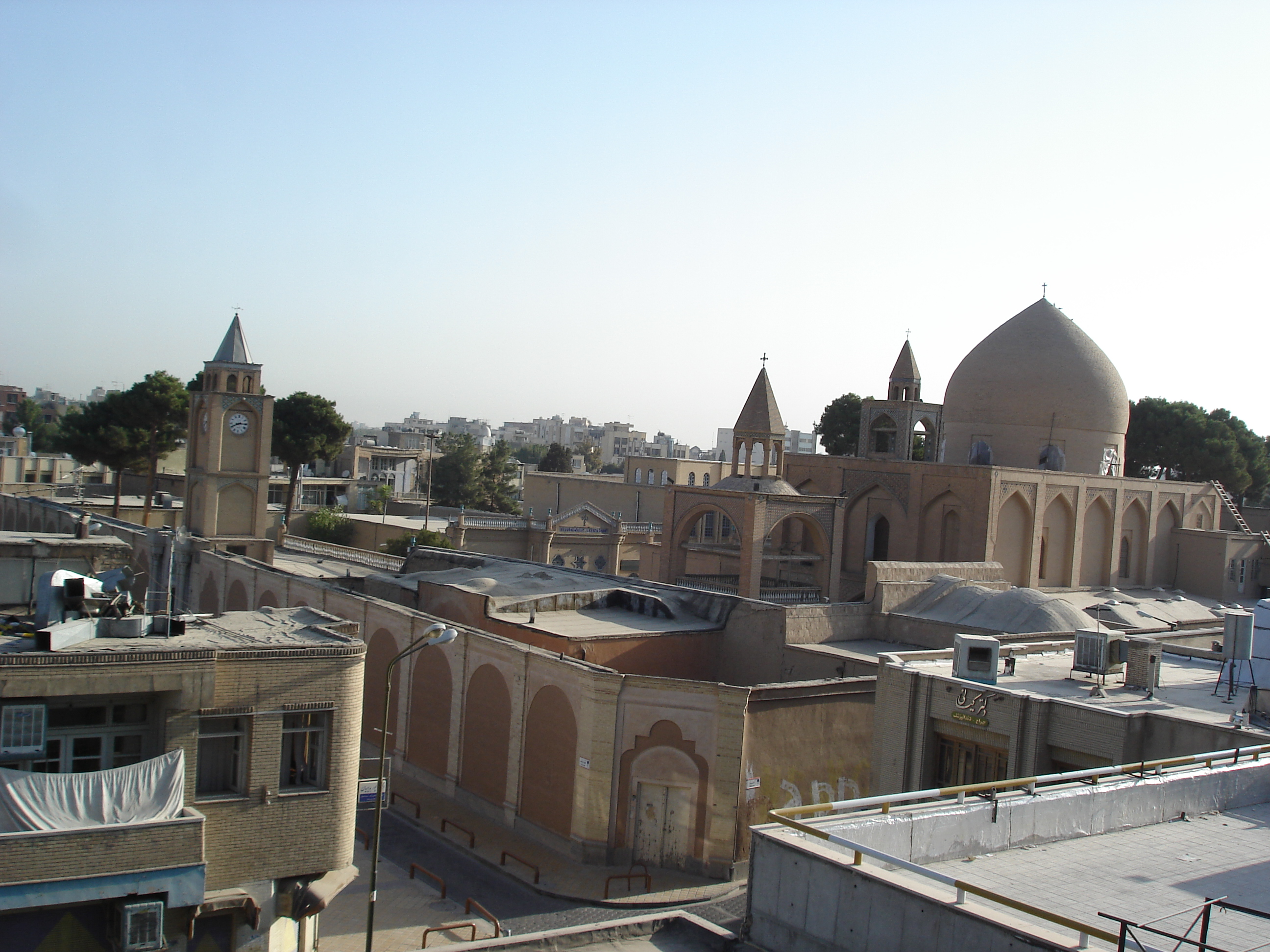
View of the modern Armenian quarter of New Jugha in Isfahan

Until the 17th century, despite wars, invasions and migrations, Armenians still made up the majority of the population of Eastern Armenia. A significant blow to the Armenian ethnos of the region was caused by its mass resettlement deep into the territory of Persia.

Polish historian, Dariusz Kołodziejczyk, notes:

After a brilliant anti-Ottoman campaign of 1603-5, Shah Abbas regained control over the provinces of Yerevan and Nakhichevan, which were the main settlements of the Eastern Armenians. As a result, the main center of Armenian religious and cultural life, the Holy See of Etchmiadzin, was once again within the borders of the Safavid Empire. Feeling that his hold on the newly conquered territories was still precarious, Abbas implemented a scorched-earth policy and undertook the massive and forcible resettlement of the local population, mainly Armenians, to central Iran.

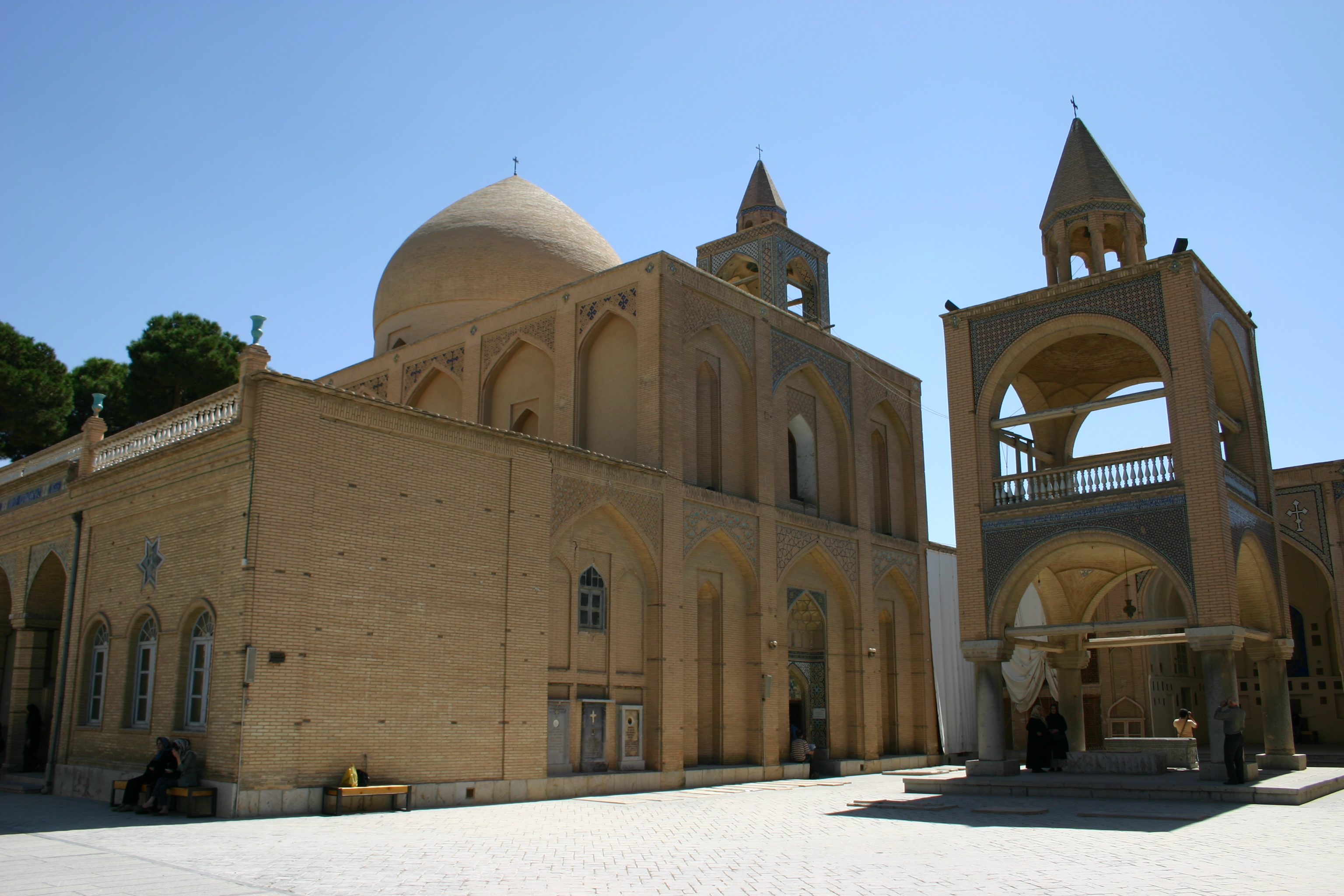
Cathedral of the Holy Christ the Savior, XVII century in Isfahan

The number of Armenians resettled from Eastern Armenia to Persia is estimated, according to various sources, from 250 thousand to 300 thousand people. According to the Azerbaijani Soviet Encyclopedia, “in 1604, the troops of Shah Abbas captured Er. and forcibly took the majority of the Armenian population to Iran". During the deportation, in particular, to get rid of the competition of Armenian merchants, a large center of merchants in the Transcaucasus was ruined - the Armenian city of Dzhuga (now Julfa, NAR), and its inhabitants (according to various estimates, from 20 thousand people to 12 thousand families) were resettled in Isfahan, where in 1605 they formed “New Julfa” (in memory of the once prosperous Armenian city) on the land allocated to them south of the Zayanderud River, the other part of the resettled scattered throughout Persia. About 500 Armenian families were forced to move to Shiraz alone. At the same time, the emigration of Armenians to the countries of Southeast Asia, in particular, India and Burma, increased. Later, in the mid-1650s, the Armenians were expelled also from regions of Isfahan, leaving them in compact residence only in New Julfa. Armenian communities also appeared in the cities of Mazandaran, Qazvin, Hamadan, Mashhad, Shiraz and others.

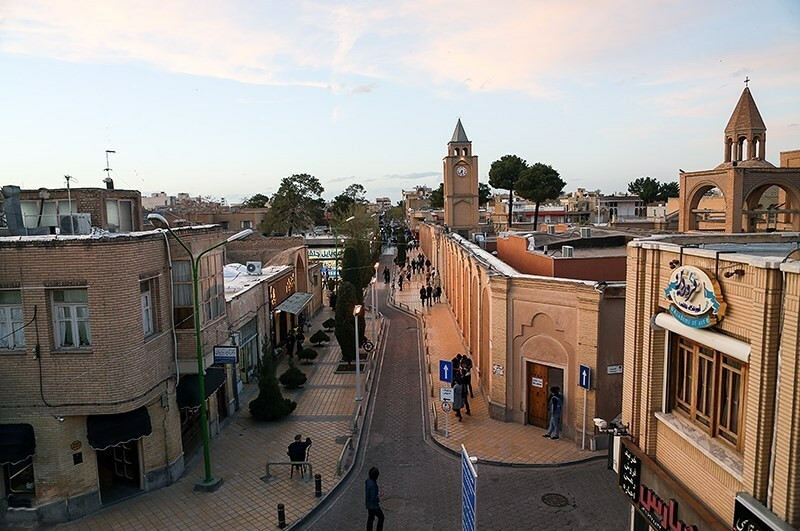
Armenian Quarter, Isfahan

Initially, Abbas's attitude towards the resettled Armenians was supportive. In the Isfahan region, Armenian settlers were granted freedom of religion and trade. The area gradually developed and flourished. Armenians were able to create a major center of international trade, including with the Russian state, Europe and India. They got a monopoly on the silk trade. However, later, pursuing a policy of forced Islamization, the Shah began to force the Armenian population to accept Islam. Those Armenians who had settled in other parts of the empire were often subjected to various forms of discrimination.

After the deportation of Armenians, nomadic tribes (mainly Turks, as well as Kurds) began to massively populate the territories they had left behind, while cities of Ararat, Alashkert and Bayazet became completely empty.

According to Encyclopædia Iranica: “In the course of its history of many centuries, the Armenian people had not yet been subjected to such a major disaster”. American historian George Bournoutian notes that by the 17th century, Armenians had become a minority in some parts of their historical lands. The American historian Richard Hovannisian points out that the forced deportation carried out by Shah Abbas and other forced mass migrations of the Armenian people led to the fact that by the 19th century Armenians retained a significant majority only in the mountainous regions of Karabakh and Zangezur. As for the Erivan and Nakhichevan khanates, the number of Armenians in them decreased to 20% by the beginning of the 1830s. Armenians also became a minority in Ganja.

== Reflections in art ==
The event was reflected in the Armenian "vokhber" (Armenian: ողբեր) literary genre - medieval Armenian historical lamentations.

In his poem "The Shah and the Peddler", the Armenian poet Hovhannes Tumanyan tells the story against the backdrop of the deportation.

== See also ==
- Deportation of the Armenian population of Nakhichevan (hy)

== Bibliography ==
=== Books ===
In English

- Bournoutian, George (2021). "The Role of the Armenians in the Russian Move into the South Caucasus". From the Kur to the Aras. A Military History of Russia's Move into the South Caucasus and the First Russo-Iranian War, 1801–1813. Iran Studies, vol. 22. Brill. pp. 237–248. ISBN 978-90-04-44516-1.
- Bournoutian, George (2003). A Concise History of the Armenian People: (from Ancient Times to the Present). Mazda Publishers. ISBN 978-1568591414.
- Bournoutian, George (2016). The 1829-1832 Russian Surveys of the Khanate of Nakhichevan (Nakhjavan). Mazda Publisher. ISBN 978-1568593333.
- Hovannisian, Richard G. (1997a). The Armenian People from Ancient to Modern Times. Vol. I. The Dynastic Periods: From Antiquity to the Fourteenth Century. Basingstoke: Palgrave Macmillan. ISBN 978-0-312-10169-5.
- Hovannisian, Richard G. (1997b). The Armenian People from Ancient to Modern Times. Vol. II. Foreign Dominion to Statehood: The Fifteenth Century to the Twentieth Century. Basingstoke: Palgrave Macmillan. ISBN 9780312101688.
- Kouymjian, Dickran (1997). "Armenia from the Fall of the Cilician Kingdom (1375) to the Forced Emigration under Shah Abbas (1604)". In Richard G. Hovannisian (ed.). The Armenian People from Ancient to Modern Times. Vol. II. Foreign Dominion to Statehood: The Fifteenth Century to the Twentieth Century. NY: Palgrave Macmillan. pp. 1–50. ISBN 0312101686.
- Bournoutian, George (1997). "Eastern Armenia from the 17th Century to the Russian Annexation". In Richard G. Hovannisian (ed.). The Armenian People from Ancient to Modern Times. Vol. II. Foreign Dominion to Statehood: The Fifteenth Century to the Twentieth Century. NY: Palgrave Macmillan. pp. 81–107. ISBN 0312101686.
- Payaslian, Simon (2008). The History of Armenia: From the Origins to the Present. NY: Palgrave Macmillan US. ISBN 9780230608580.
- Lea, David; Rowe, Annamarie; Miller, Dr. Isabel (2001). "Armenia". A Political Chronology of the Middle East (First ed.). UK: Psychology Press. ISBN 9781857431155.
- Shakeri, Zand (1998). The Armenians of Iran: The Paradoxical Role of a Minority in a Dominant Culture, Articles and Documents. Harvard Middle Eastern Monographs. Cambridge: Harvard University Press. ISBN 9780932885166.
- Barry, James (2019). Armenian Christians in Iran: Ethnicity, Religion, and Identity in the Islamic Republic. Cambridge: Cambridge University Press. ISBN 9781108429047.
- Braudel, Fernand (1992). Civilization and Capitalism, 15th-18th Century. Berkeley, LA: University of California Press. ISBN 9780520081154.
- Price, Massoume (2005). Iran's Diverse Peoples: A Reference Sourcebook. ABC-CLIO. ISBN 9781576079935.
- Kołodziejczyk, Dariusz (2017). "Christians in the Safavid Empire". In David Thomas; John A. Chesworth (eds.). Christian-Muslim Relations. A Bibliographical History. Volume 10 Ottoman and Safavid Empires (1600-1700). Vol. 10. Leiden, Boston: Brill. ISBN 9789004346048.
- Kennedy, Hugh N; Brice, William Charles (1981). Historical Atlas of Islam. Brill. ISBN 9789004061163.
- Bournoutian, George A. (1994). "Armenian". In James Stuart Olson, Lee Brigance Pappas, Nicholas Charles Pappas (ed.). An Ethnohistorical Dictionary of the Russian and Soviet Empires. Westport, Conn.: Greenwood press. ISBN 9780313274978.
- von Haxthausen, August Freiherr (1854). Transcaucasia: Sketches of the Nations and Races Between the Black Sea and the Caspian. London: Chapman.
- Hewsen, Robert H. (2001). Armenia: A Historical Atlas. University Of Chicago Press. ISBN 0-226-33228-4.
- Seth, Mesrovb Jacob (1897). History of the Armenians in India from the Earliest Times to the Present Day. Luzac & co.
- Walker, Christopher J. (1980). Armenia: The Survival of a Nation. London: Croom Helm.
- Bournoutian, George A. (1999). "The Politics of Demography: Misuse of Sources on the Armenian Population of Mountainous Karabakh". Journal of the Society for Armenian Studies. 9. New York.
- Aslanian, Sebouh David (2011). From the Indian Ocean to the Mediterranean. The Global Trade Networks of Armenian Merchants from New Julfa. University of California Press. ISBN 9780520947573.

In other languages

- Акопян, Т.Х. (1977). Очерк истории Еревана (in Russian). Ер.: Издательство Ереванского университета.
- Аракел Даврижеци (1978). "4". Книга историй. Перевод с армянского. М.: Главная редакция восточной литературы издательства «Наука».
- Новосельцев, Пашуто, Черепнин, А.П., В. Т., Л. В. (1972). Пути развития феодализма: (Закавказье, Сред. Азия, Русь, Прибалтика) (PDF). М.: Наука.
- Рыбаков, Алаев, Ашфарян и др. (2000). История Востока. В 6 т. (PDF). Vol. 2. Восток в средние века. М.: Восточная литература. ISBN 5-02-017711-3.
- Рыбаков, Алаев, Ашфарян и др., Р.Б., Л.Б., К.З. (2002). История Востока. В 6 т. (PDF). Vol. 3. Восток на рубеже средневековья и нового времени XVI-XVIII вв. М.: Восточная литература РАН. ISBN 5-02-017913-2.
- Петрушевский, И. П. (1949). Очерки по истории феодальных отношений в Азербайджане и Армении в XVI — начале XIX вв (PDF). Ленинград: Ленинградский университет.
- Смирин, М. М. (1958). Всемирная история в 10 томах. Т. 4. Соцэкгиз.
- Рыбаков, Белявский и др., Б. А. Рыбаков, М. Т. Белявский, Г. А. Новицкий, А. М. Сахаров (1983). История СССР с древнейших времён до конца XVIII в. (2-е изд., перераб. и доп. ed.). М.: Высшая школа.
- де Рубрук, Гильом (1997). "Продолжение путешествия по Араксу. О городе Наксуа, о земле Сагенсы и о других местах". Джованни дель Плано Карпини. История монгалов. Гильом де Рубрук. Путешествие в восточные страны. Книга Марко Поло. Вступ. ст. и комментарии М. Б. Горнунга. М.: Мысль. ISBN 5-244-00851-X.
- Армянские предания. М.: Litres. 2018. ISBN 9785040624874.
- Malkhasyan, Mikayel (2020). DEMOGRAPHIC PROCESSES IN ARMENIA IN THE 16TH CENTURY AND IN THE FIRST HALF OF THE 17TH CENTURY (PDF) (in Armenian). Yerevan: YSU PRESS.

=== Articles ===
- Мкртчян, Тер-Мкртичян, Л. К.; Л. X. (1961). "Из истории армянской общины в Бирме. (по материалам XIX в.)". Народы Азии и Африки. Наука.
- Bournoutian, George (1980). "The Population of Persian Armenia Prior to and Immediately Following its Annexation to the Russian Empire, 1826-32" (PDF). Nationalism and Social Change in Transcaucasin. "24-25"
- Moreen, Vera B. (1981). "The Status of Religious Minorities in Safavid Iran 1617-61". Journal of Near Eastern Studies. 40 (2). The University of Chicago Press: 119–134. doi:10.1086/372866. JSTOR 545037. S2CID 162267702.

=== Encyclopedias ===
- Encyclopædia Iranica. ARMENIA AND IRAN VI. "ARMENIA AND IRAN VI. Armeno-Iranian relations in the Islamic period". Encyclopædia Iranica.
- Stokes, Jamie; consultants: Gorman, Anthony (2009). "Armenians". Encyclopedia of the Peoples of Africa and the Middle East. New York: Facts on File. pp. 52–66. ISBN 9781438126760.
