= Armenians in Shamakhi =

Շամախցի • Shamakhtsi
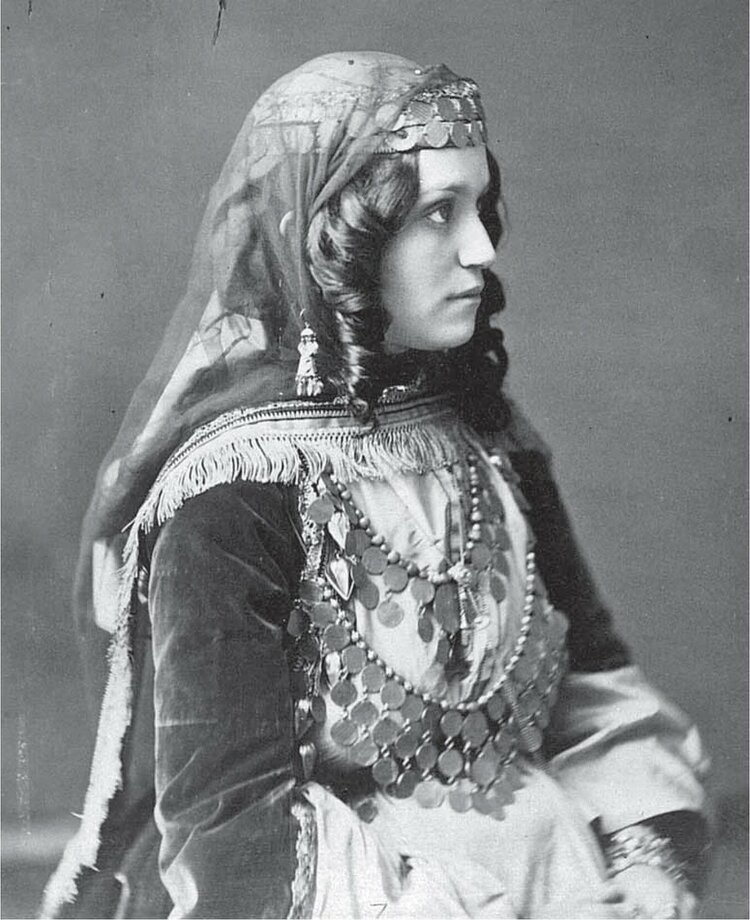
- Armenian woman from Shamakhi in the 19th century

Regions with significant populations
- Shamakhi, Mədrəsə, Şirvan

Languages
- Armenian, Tat Persian, Azerbaijani

Religion
- Christianity (mostly Armenian Apostolic and Protestant) and Islam (mostly Shia)

Related ethnic groups
- Armenians in Azerbaijan

Armenians have had a longstanding historical presence in the Shamakhi District (Armenian: Շամախի). From the 16th century up until the 18th century, Armenians formed the majority population of the capital, Shamakhi. Armenians retained a significant presence in the Shamakhi district until the First Nagorno-Karabakh war, which resulted in the forced displacement of the remaining unassimilated Shamakhi Armenians to Armenia.

== History ==
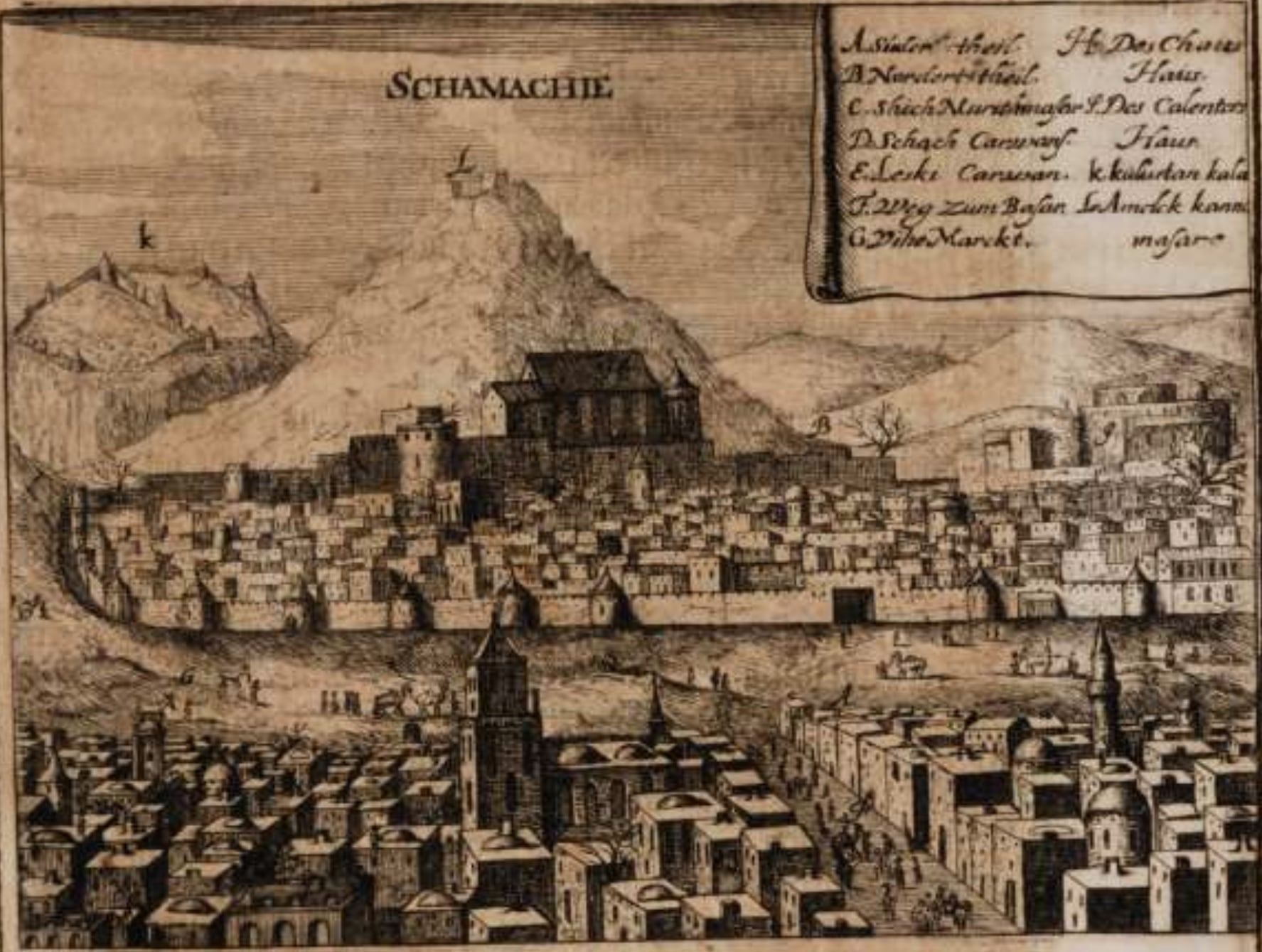
Image of Shamakhi in the 16th century from Adam Olearius’ book where he cited Armenians as the majority population

On the origins of the Shamakhi Armenians, Miller quotes bishop Mesrop Smbatian in stating that at least some groups of them were eighteenth-century migrants from Karabakh. Armenians of Kilvar claimed descent from mediaeval migrants from Edessa (present-day Şanlıurfa, Turkey). Miller concluded that Armenians of Madrasa may have been early migrants from the Absheron Peninsula where the presence of a Christian community was historically attested. Archaeologist Vladimir Sysoyev, who visited Shamakhi in 1925 and described ruins of a mediaeval Armenian church, held interviews with local residents who dated the first settlement of Armenians in Shamakhi and its vicinities to the late sixteenth or early seventeenth century.

In 1562 Englishman Anthony Jenkinson described the city of Shamakhi in the following terms: "This city is five days' walk on camels from the sea, now it has fallen a lot; it is predominantly populated by Armenians..." Adam Olearius, who visited Shamakhi in 1637, wrote: "Its inhabitants are in part Armenians and Georgians, who have their particular language; they would not understand each other if they did not use Turkish, which is common to all and very familiar, not only in Shirvan, but also everywhere in Persia". In the mid-1700s, the population of Shamakhi was about 60,000, most of whom were Armenians.

The British Penny Cyclopaedia stated in 1833 that "The bulk of the population of Shirvan consists of the Tahtar, or, to speak more correctly, Turkish race, with some admixture of Arabs and Persians. . . . Besides the Mohammedans, who form the mass of the population, there are many Armenians, some Jews, and a few Gipsies. According to the official returns of 1831, the number of males belonging to the Mohammedan population was 62,934; Armenians, 6,375; Jews, 332; total males 69,641. The prevalent language of Shirvan is what is there called Toorkee or Turkish, which is also used in Azerbijan". The same source also states that according to the official returns of 1832, the city of Shamakhi was inhabited by only 2,233 families, as a result of devastation from the sack of the city "in the most barbarous manner by the highlanders of Daghestan" in 1717. The Encyclopædia Britannica stated that in 1873 the city had 25,087 inhabitants, "of which 18,680 were Tartars (later known as Azerbaijanis), and Shachsevans, 5,177 were Armenians, and 1,230 Russians".

In 1918, there were 15 villages with a homogeneous Armenian population in the area surrounding Shamakhi: Matrasa, Meisari, Qarqanj, Qalakhan, Arpavut, Khanishen, Dara-Qarqanj, Mirishen, Zarkhu, Saghian, Pakhraqush, Giurjilar, Ghajar, Tvarishen and Balishen.

In the beginnings of the First Nagorno-Karabakh war, the Armenians of Shamakhi found themselves in a hostile situation. During the late 1980s and early 1990s, the Armenian populated villages of the Shamakhi district underwent a forced village exchange with Azerbaijani populated villages of Armenia. The remaining Armenians of Shamakhi were forcefully displaced from their homes.

== Culture ==
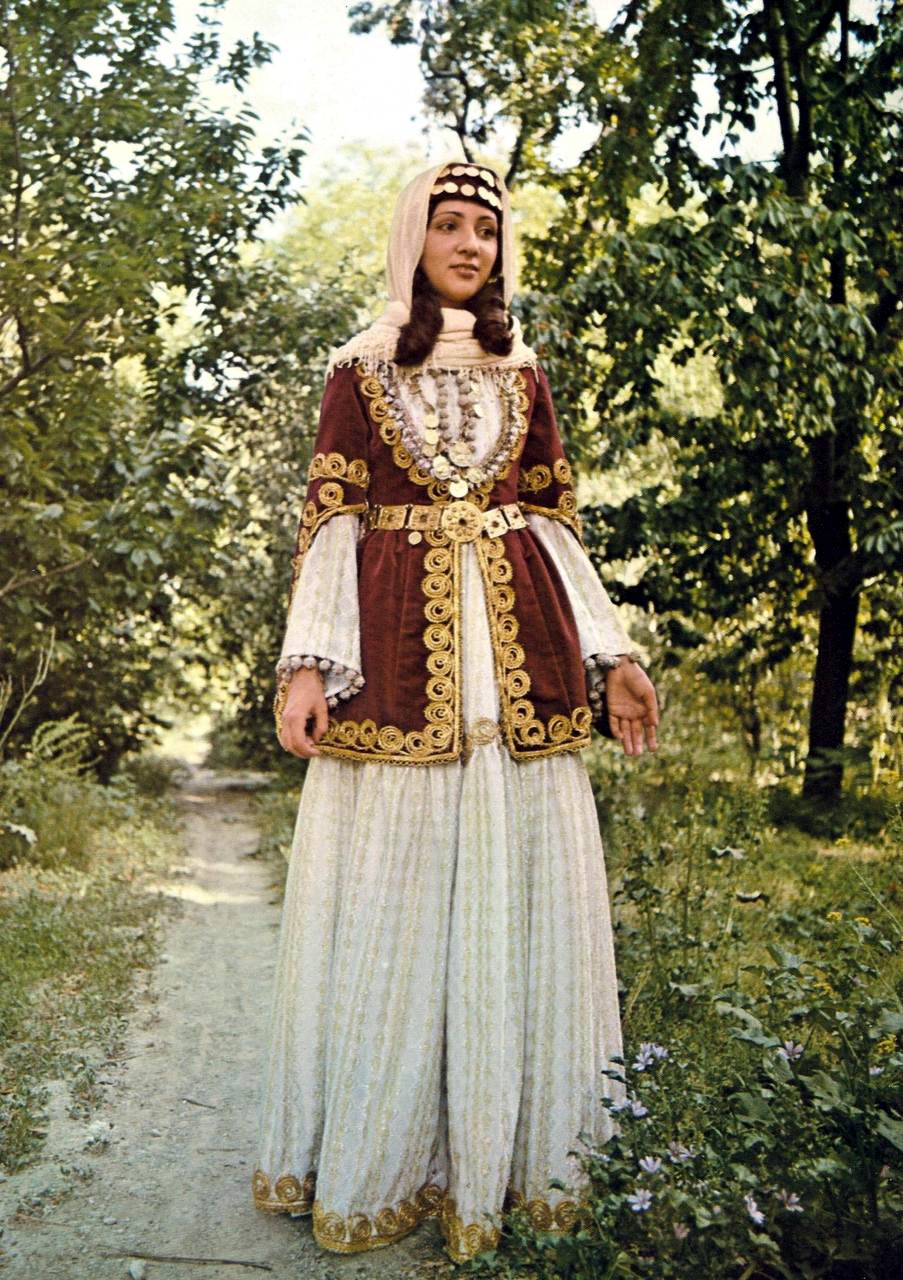
Traditional Armenian dress from Shamakhi, 19th century

=== Textiles ===
Silk production was the main output of Shamakhi and a significant part of the cultural heritage of Armenians with 130 silk-winding establishments, owned mostly by Armenians, although the industry considerably declined since 1864.

Shamakhi was also one of the centers of Armenian carpet making. The Shamakhi carpet style was known for its unique dragon motifs. The Armenian dragon carpet, known natively as the vishapagorg, was one of the most popular carpet styles throughout the caucasus and an important representation of Armenian cultural heritage.

=== Shamakhi dancers ===
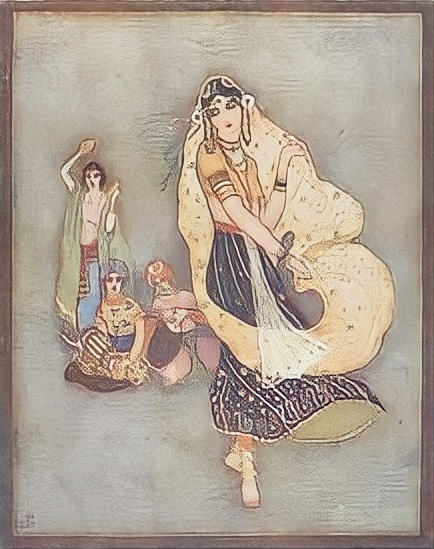
Depiction of Armen Ohanian on the Latin edition of the book Dancers of Shamakha, 1921

Shamakhi was known for its unique Shamakhi dancers. This art form was enjoyed by Armenians and Azerbaijanis alike. Armenian dancers like Armen Ohanian had great contributions to the art form. The Dancer of Shamakha recounts the life of Armenian dancer Armen Ohanian, her education as a dancer, her childhood in Russia, and her travels in Iran and Egypt. It was published in French as La Danseuse de Shamakha in 1918 and translated into English in 1923 by Rose Wilder. After moving to Europe, Ohanian danced traditional dances for audiences, gave lectures on poetry, and was an active member in intellectual and political circles.

== Religion ==
According to the Brockhaus and Efron Encyclopedic Dictionary (vol. 77, p. 460, published in 1903), Shamakhi had 20,008 inhabitants (10,450 males and 9,558 females), of which 79% of the population was Muslim, of which 22% was Sunni and the rest Shiite; the remaining 21% was "Armeno-Gregorian" (members of the Armenian Apostolic Church) and "Pravoslav" (Orthodox). Shamakhi also had a significant Armenian Protestant community that was often in conflict with the Armenian Apostolic Church.

Olearius, Bakikhanov and Miller noted a high rate of assimilation among Shirvan Armenians, with some adopting Muslim faith and diffusing in the majority (this went on well into the eighteenth century) and others shifting to the Tat language, while remaining Christian.

== Armeno-Tats ==
Armeno-Tats are a distinct group of Tat-speaking Armenians that historically populated eastern parts of the South Caucasus especially in the Shamakhi district. Most scholars researching the Tat language, such as Boris Miller and Igrar Aliyev, agree that Armeno-Tats are ethnic Armenians who underwent a language shift and adopted Tat as their first language. This is explained on one hand by the self-identification of Armeno-Tats who stated during Miller's research that they consider themselves Armenian as well as by some linguistic features of their dialect.

== Language ==
Adam Olearius travelled through the historical region of Shirvan (present-day central Azerbaijan) in 1637 and mentioned the existence of a community of Armenians in the city of Shamakhi, who "had its own language" but also "spoke Turkic, as did all people in Shirvan".

=== Shamakhi dialect ===
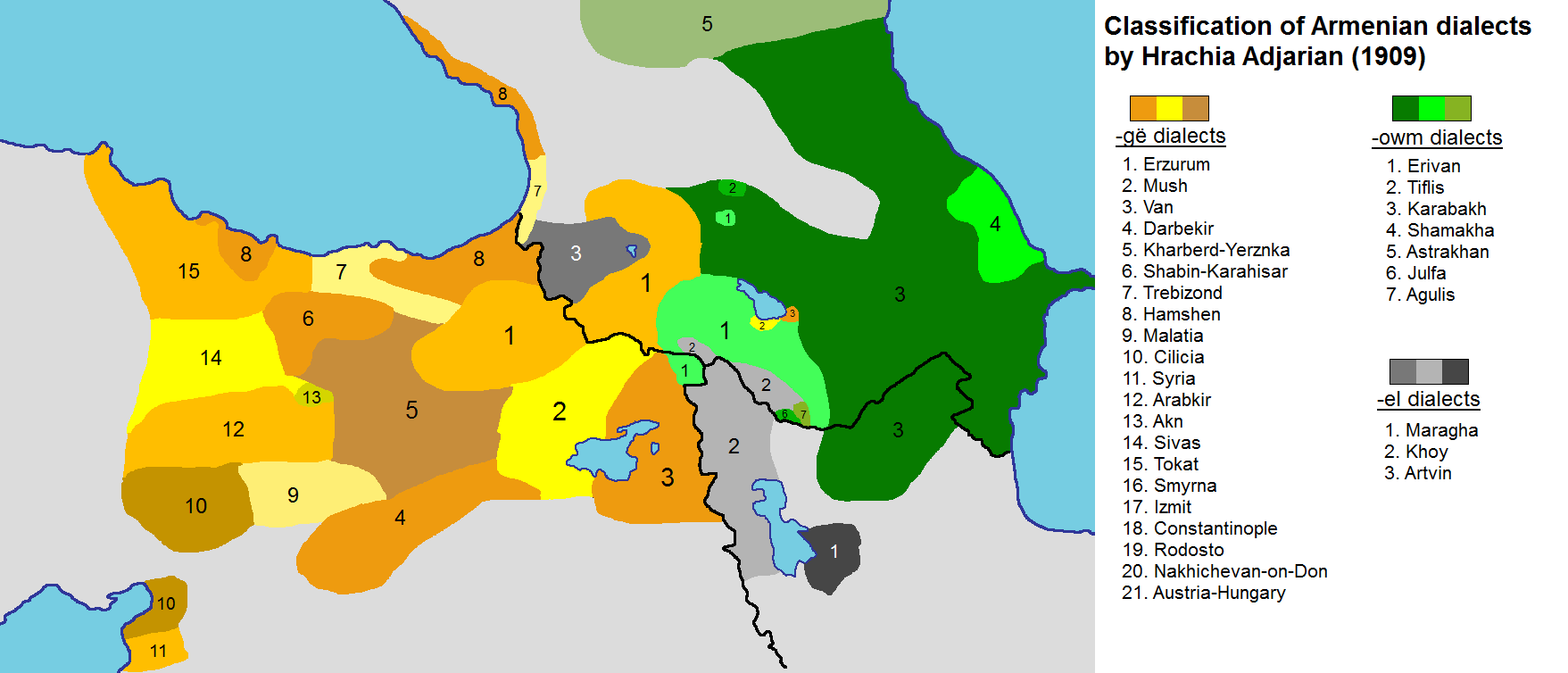
Armenian dialects in 1909 with the Shamakhi dialect being highlighted as number 4 in light green

The Shamakhi dialect of Armenian, similar to the Karabakh dialect, was a significant part of the cultural heritage of Shamakhi Armenians. It was well-preserved when Armenians lived in Shamakhi due to their minority status, but fell out of use following the forced relocation of Armenians in 1988.

== Notable natives ==
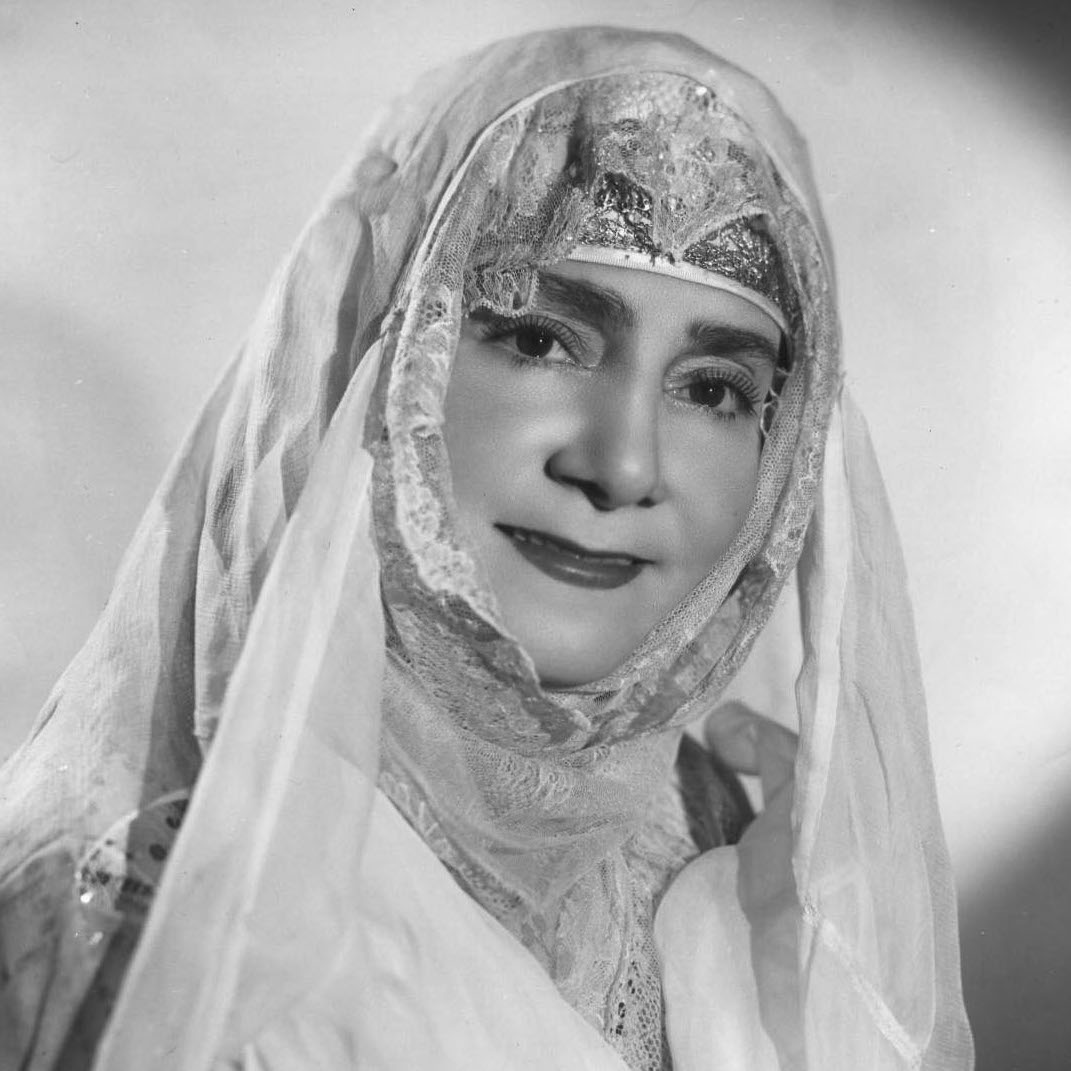
Armen Ohanian

- Armen Ohanian - Armenian dancer, actress, writer and translator
- Hovhannes Abelian - actor
- Alexander Shirvanzade - playwright and novelist, awarded by the "People's Writer of Armenia" and "People's Writer of Azerbaijan" titles
- Gostan Zarian - Armenian writer and poet

== Gallery ==
Armenian woman from Shamakhi, by D. E. Yermakov, 1870s

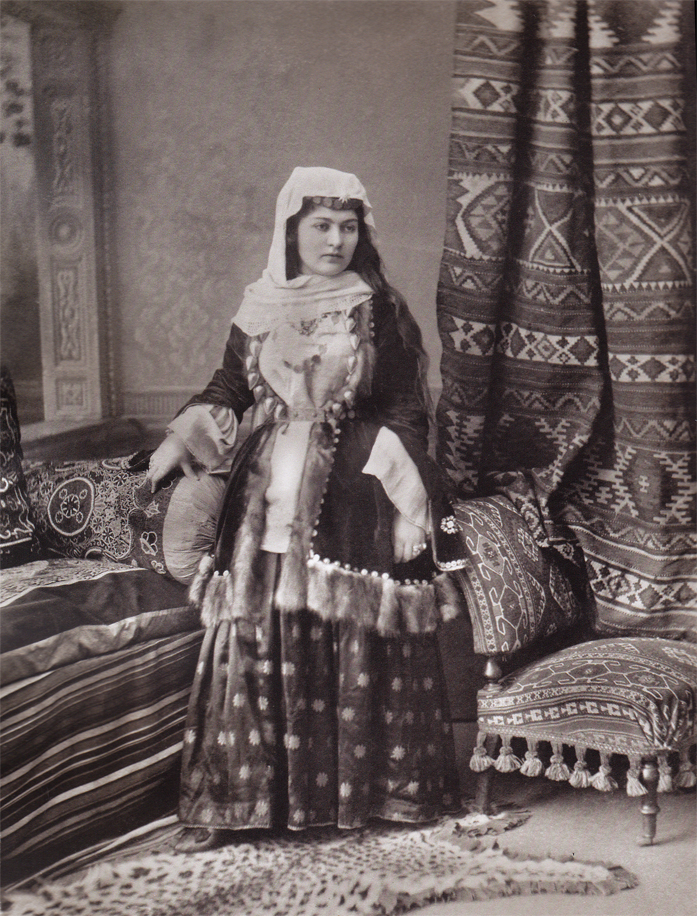
Noble Armenian woman from Shamakhi in the 19th century

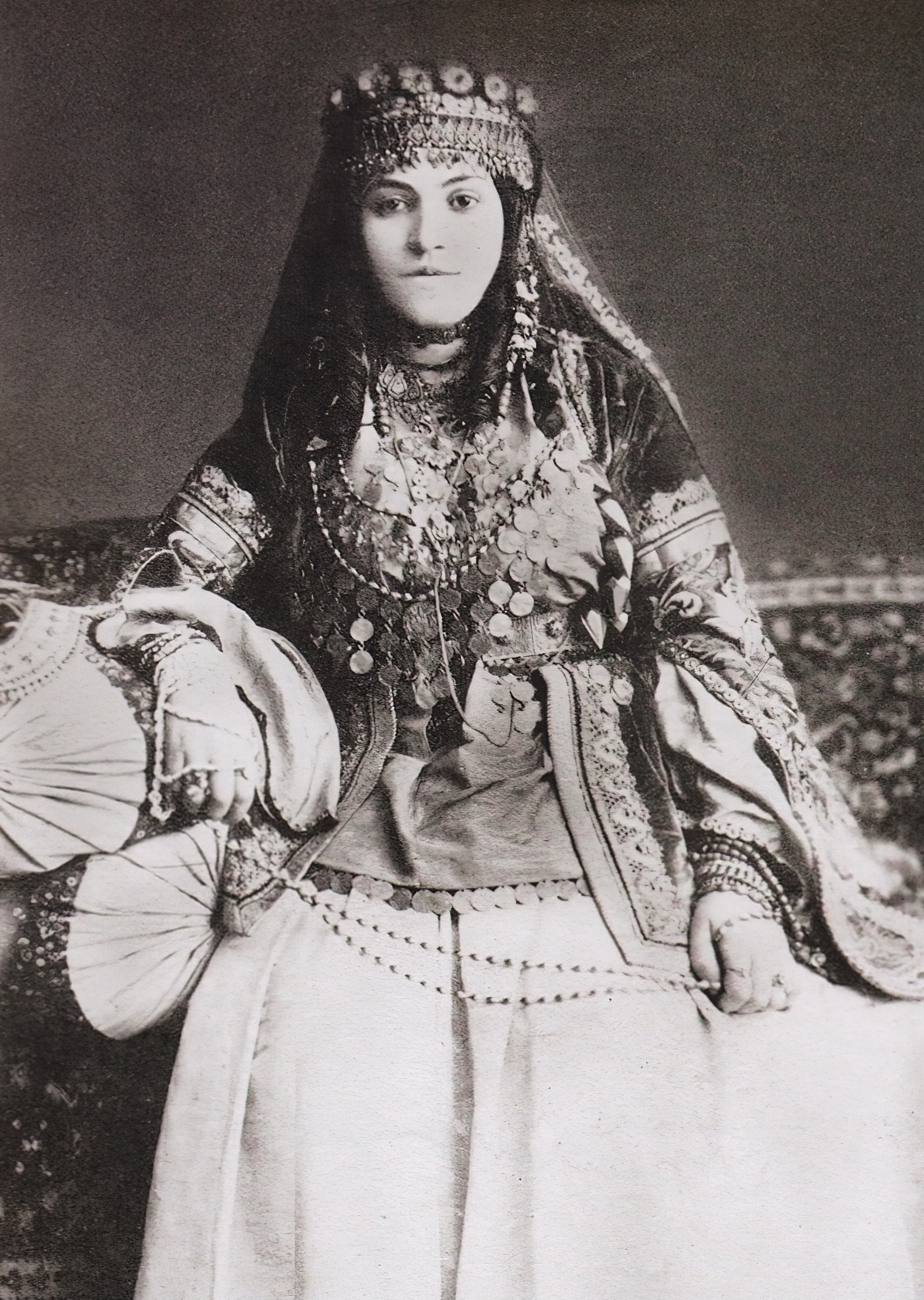
Photo of the traditional dress of Armenian girl in Shamakhi in the late 19th century by F. Orden

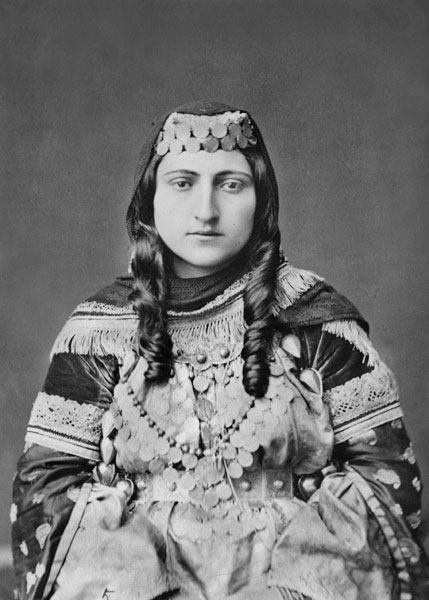
Armenian woman from Shamakhi, 1883

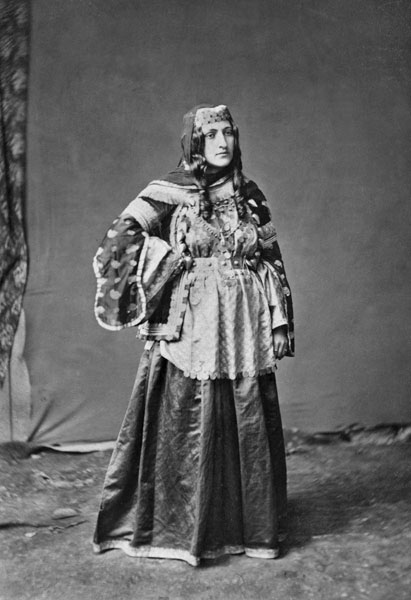
Armenian woman from Shamakha (nowadays in Azerbaijan). 1883

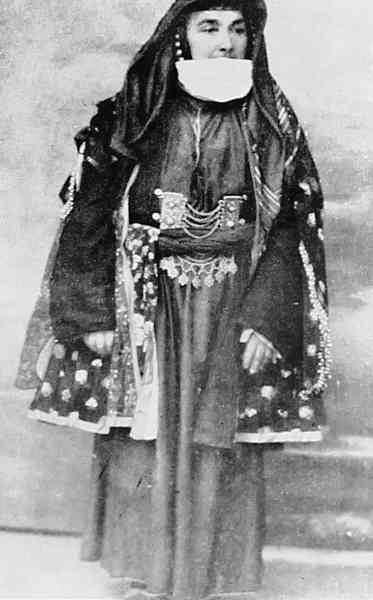
Armenian lady from Shamakhi

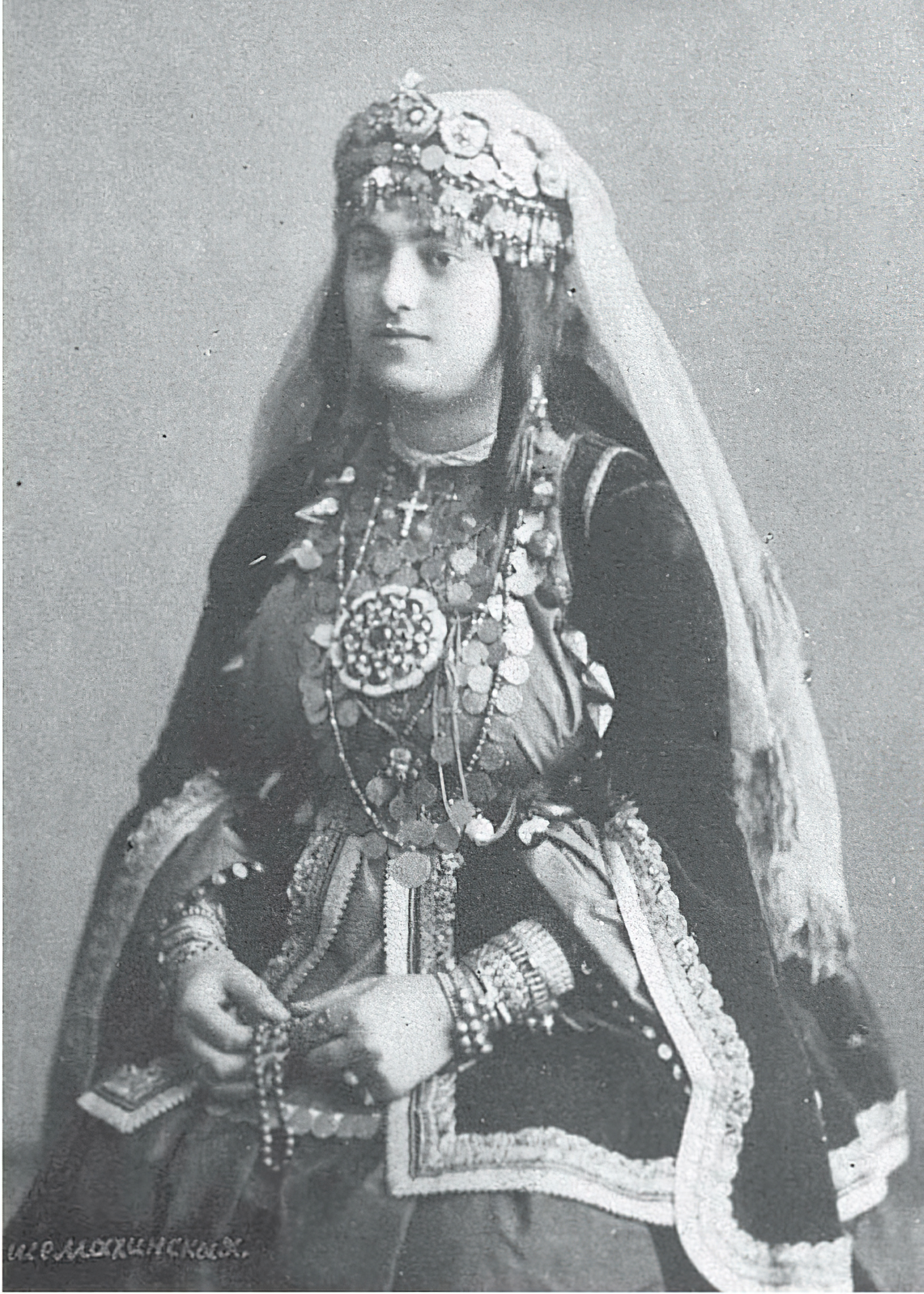
Armenian woman from Shamakhi

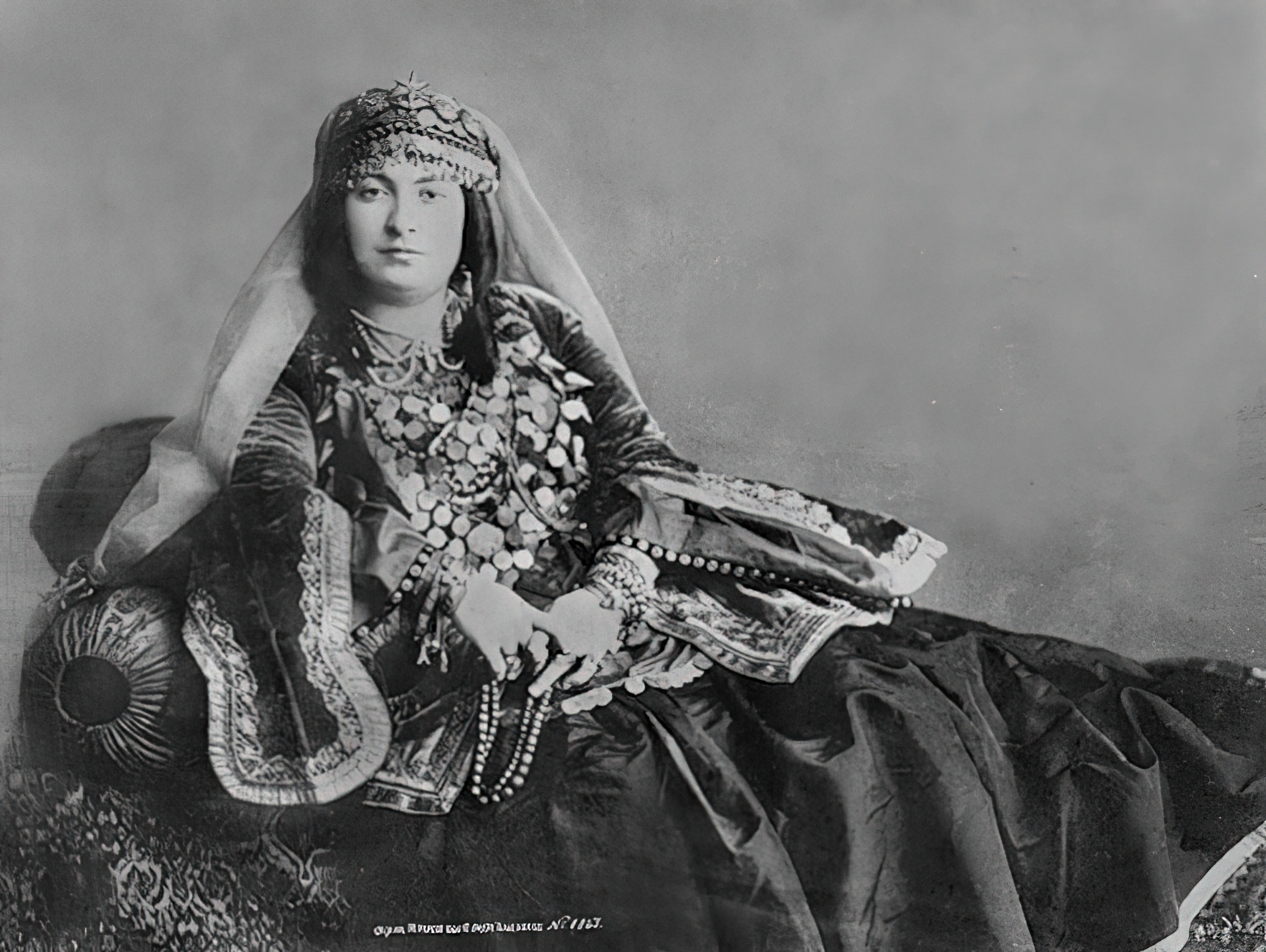
Armenian woman from Shamakhi, Photo by F. Orden 1897

== See also ==
- Armenians in Azerbaijan
- Armenians in Baku
- Armenians in Nakhchivan
