= Shirvanzade =

Shirvanzade may refer to:

- Alexander Shirvanzade, pen name of Alexander Movsesyan (1858-1935), Armenian playwright and novelist
- Xoylu, Shamakhi, village in Azerbaijan
