= Shamakhi =

Shamakhi Şamaxı
- City
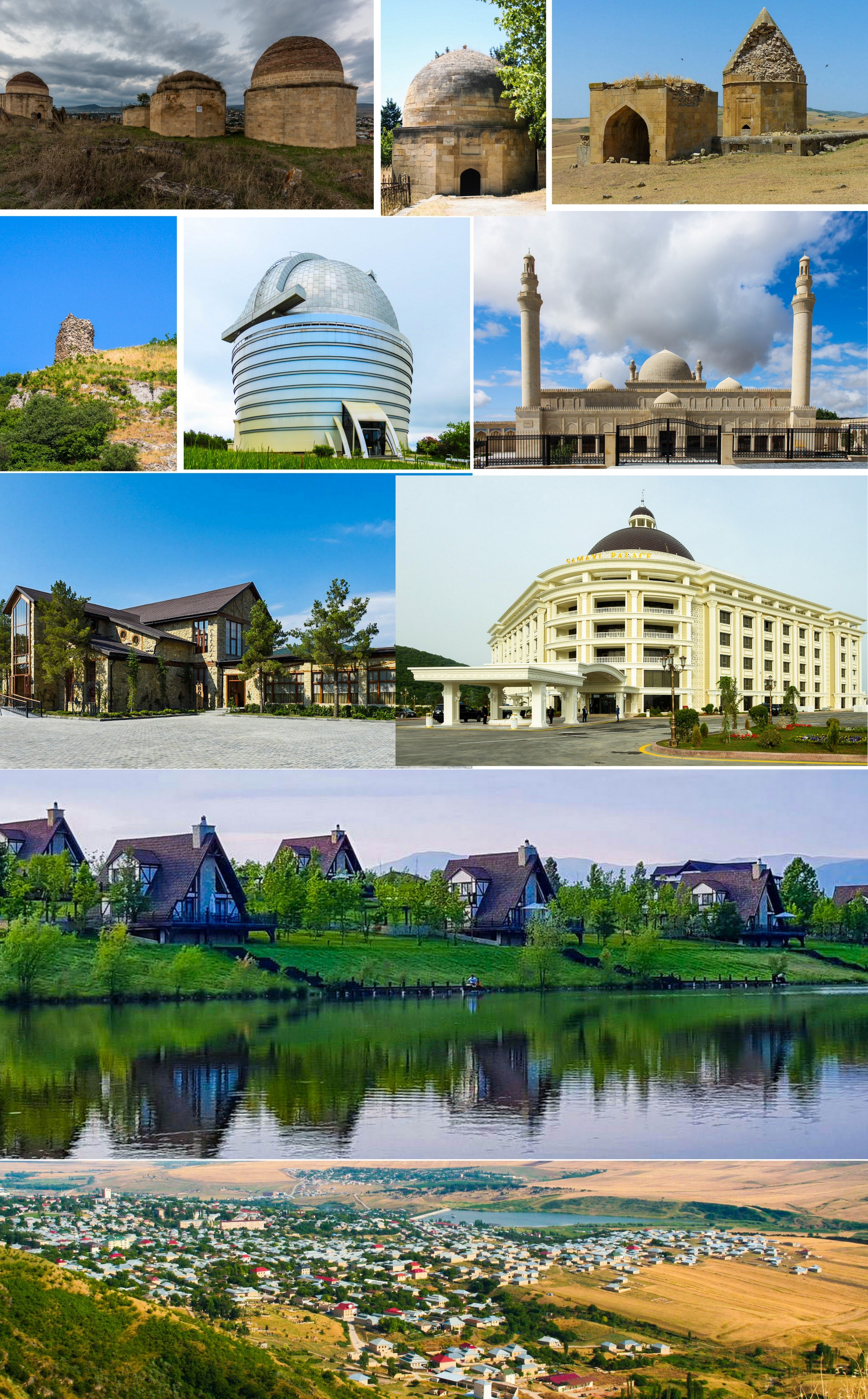

- Location within Azerbaijan
- Coordinates: 40°37′49″N 48°38′29″E
- Country: Azerbaijan
- District: Shamakhi

Area
  - Total: 6 km^{2} (2.3 sq mi)
- Elevation: 709 m (2,326 ft)

Population (2010)
  - Total: 31,704
  - Density: 5,300/km^{2} (14,000/sq mi)
- Time zone: UTC+4 (AZT)
- Area code: +994 2026

Shamakhi (Azerbaijani: Şamaxı, pronounced [ʃɑmɑˈxɯ]) is a city in Azerbaijan and the administrative centre of the Shamakhi District. The city's estimated population as of 2010 was 31,704. It is famous for its traditional dancers, and also for perhaps giving its name to the Soumak rugs.

Eleven major earthquakes have rocked Shamakhi, but through multiple reconstructions, it maintained its role as the economic and administrative capital of Shirvan and one of the key towns on the Silk Road. The only building to have survived eight of the eleven earthquakes is the landmark Juma Mosque of Shamakhi, built in the 8th century.

== History ==
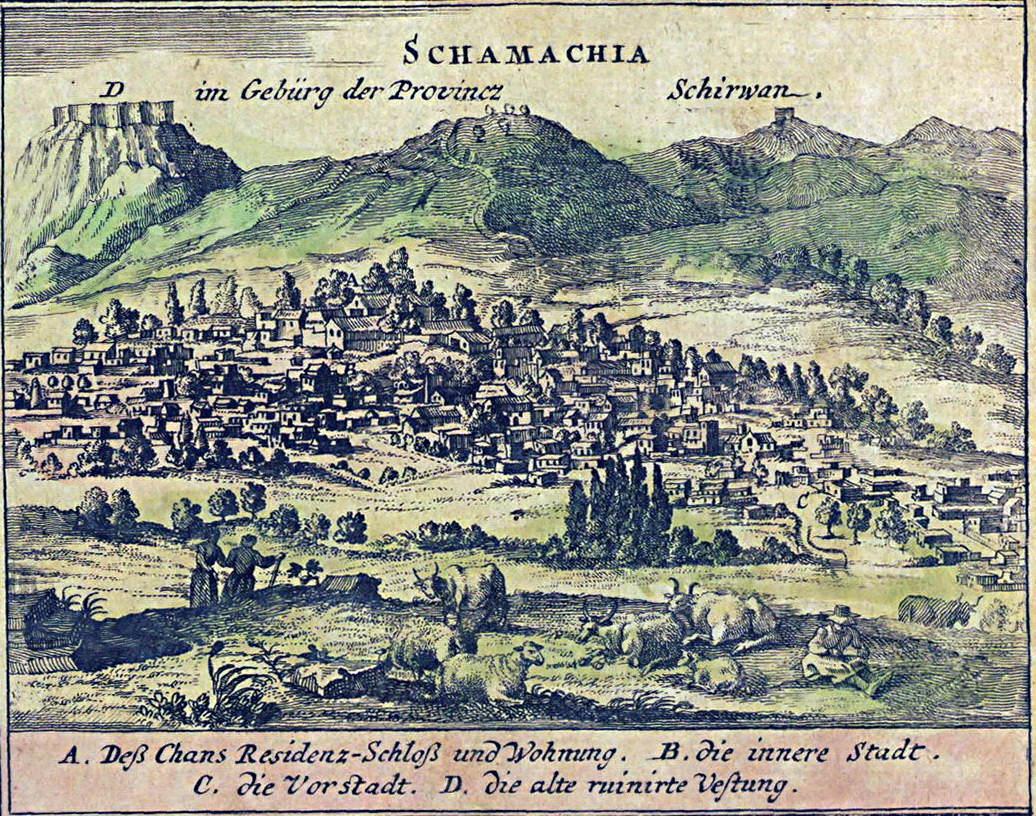
1683 illustration of Shamakhi by Engelbert Kaempfer (published 1734)

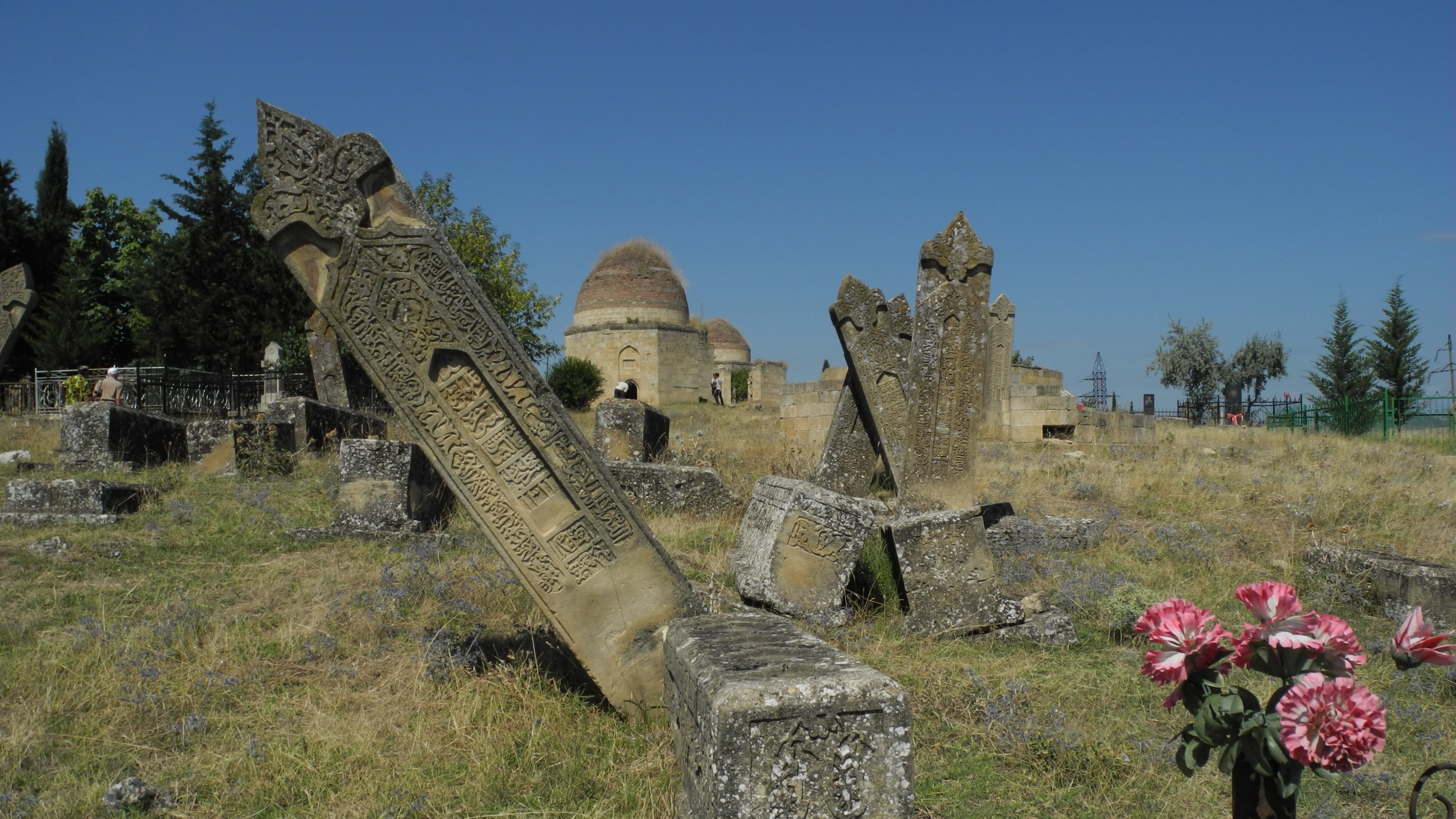
Yeddi Gumbez Mausoleum

Shamakhi was in antiquity part of successive Persian empires and was first mentioned as Kamachia by the ancient Greco-Roman Egyptian geographer Claudius Ptolemaeus in the 1st to 2nd century AD. Shamakhi was an important town during the Middle Ages and served as a capital of the Shirvanshah realm from the 8th to 15th centuries.

Shamakhi maintained economic and cultural relations with India and China in the 12th century, and the excavation of pottery containers proves that Shamakhi also had relations with the Central Asian cities at around the same time. Copper coins found in Shamakhi during archaeological excavations, porcelain containers produced in China, caravanserais serving international trade, prove the role of ancient Shamakhi in the Silk Road.

The Catholic friar, missionary, and explorer William of Rubruck passed through it on his return journey from the Mongol Great Khan's court. In 1476 Venetian diplomat Giosafat Barbaro, while describing the city, stated: "This [Sammachi] is a good city; it has from four to five thousand houses, it produces silk, cotton as well as other things according to its tradition.".

In 1500–1501, it was taken by the Safavid dynasty. Following the conquest of the area by the first Safavid ruler Ismail I, he allowed the descendants of Farrukh Yassar to rule Shamakhi and the rest of Shirvan under Safavid suzerainty. This lasted until 1538, when his son and successor, Shah Tahmasp I (r. 1524–1576), turned the territory into a full Safavid province and appointed its first Safavid governor. From then on, Shamakhi functioned as the capital of the Shirvan province. In 1562, Englishman Anthony Jenkinson described the city in the following terms: "This city is five days' walk on camels from the sea; now it has fallen a lot; it is predominantly populated by Armenians..."

According to Carmelite monks who visited the city in 1607, its population was made up of Persians and Armenians. Armenians were actively engaged in trade. In addition to ordinary taxes, the Armenian people paid tribute to other religions. Adam Olearius, who visited Shamakhi in 1637, wrote: "Its inhabitants are in part Armenians and Georgians, who have their particular language; they would not understand each other if they did not use Turkish, which is common to all and very familiar, not only in Shirvan, but also everywhere in Persia". The Ottoman traveler Evliya Çelebi visited the town in 1647 and described it as having

about 7,000 well built houses...26 quarters... seventy mosques...forty schools for boys, seven pleasant baths...forty caravanserais...the greatest part of the inhabitants are Sunnis of the Hanefirites, who perform their prayers secretly.

In the 1670s, the Spanish traveler Pedro Cobro Sebastian wrote that the inhabitants of Shamakhi were Persians, Armenians, and Georgians. According to John Bell, an English tourist, Turkish was the common language of the people of 1715, but the city's elites spoke Persian and there were many Georgians and Armenians in the city. The locals were mainly engaged in winemaking, animal husbandry, and carpet weaving. In 1721, the Lezgins of the Safavid provinces of Shirvan and Dagestan, aided by the (rest of the) Sunni inhabitants of the area, sacked the city. They massacred thousands of its Shia inhabitants, apart from looting the city and robbing the property of its Christian inhabitants and foreign nationals, the latter of which were mostly the city's many Russian merchants.

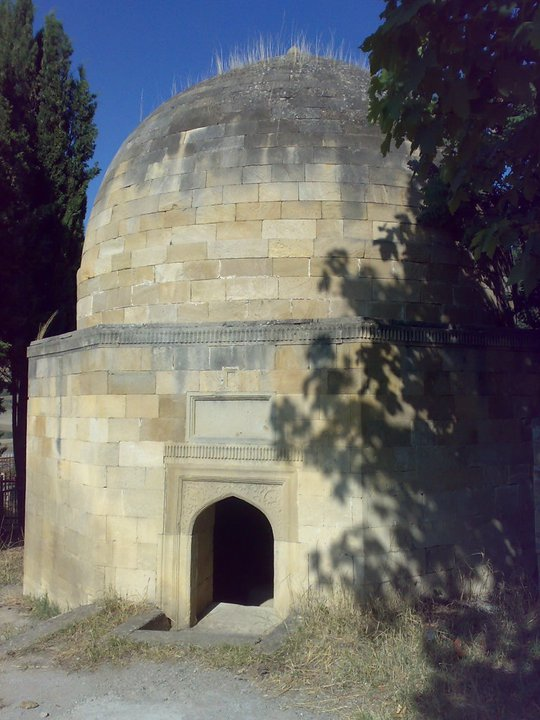
Mausoleum of Shakhandan, brother of famous Azeri poet Nasimi. Built in the 17th century.

The Russian forces first entered Shirvan in 1723, as they invaded the Safavid Iranian territories in the North Caucasus and Transcaucasia during the Russo-Persian War (1722–1723), using the attack on their subjects in Shamakhi shortly before by the rebellious Lezgins as one of the pretexts. They however soon retired from the city, leaving it to Ottomans, who possessed it from 1723 to '35 until Nader Shahs rise. In 1742, Shamakhi was taken and destroyed by Nader Shah, reincorporating it back to Iran, and he, to punish the inhabitants for their Sunnite creed, built a new town under the same name about 26 kilometres (16 mi) to the west, at the foot of the main chain of the Caucasus Mountains. The new Shamakhi was at different times a residence of the Shirvan Khanate, ruled by semi-independent khans, but it was finally abandoned, and the old town rebuilt. In the mid-1700s, the population of Shamakhi was about 60,000, most of whom were Armenians. At this time it was one of the best and most populous cities of Iran, before it was destroyed by an earthquake. The Shirvan Khanate was finally annexed by Russia in 1805 during the Russo-Persian War (1804–1813) and Qajar Iran was forced to irrevocably cede the sovereignty over the town to Russia, under the Treaty of Gulistan of 1813.

The British Penny Cyclopaedia stated in 1833 that "The bulk of the population of Shirvan consists of the Tahtar, or, to speak more correctly, Turkish race, with some admixture of Arabs and Persians. . . . Besides the Mohammedans, who form the mass of the population, there are many Armenians, some Jews, and a few Gipsies. According to the official returns of 1831, the number of males belonging to the Mohammedan population was 62,934; Armenians, 6,375; Jews, 332; total males, 69,641. The prevalent language of Shirvan is what is there called Toorkee or Turkish, which is also used in Azerbijan". The same source also states that according to the official returns of 1832, the city of Shamakhi was inhabited by only 2,233 families, as a result of devastation from the sack of the city "in the most barbarous manner by the highlanders of Daghestan" in 1717. The Encyclopædia Britannica stated that in 1873 the city had 25,087 inhabitants, "of which 18,680 were Tartars and Shachsevans, 5,177 were Armenians, and 1,230 Russians". Silk production continued to be the main output, with 130 silk-winding establishments, owned mostly by Armenians, although the industry had considerably declined since 1864.

Shamakhi was the capital of the Shemakha uezd of the Shemakha Governorate of the Russian Empire until the devastating earthquake of 1859, when the capital of the province was transferred to Baku. The importance of the city declined sharply afterwards. According to the Brockhaus and Efron Encyclopedic Dictionary (vol. 77, p. 460, published in 1903), Shamakhi had 20,008 inhabitants (10,450 males and 9,558 females), of which 3% were Russians, 18% were Armenians, and 79% "Azerbaijani Tatars" (later known as Azerbaijanis). With regard to religion, 79% of the population was Muslim, of which 22% was Sunni and the rest Shia; the remaining 21% was Armenian Apostolic and Eastern Orthodox.

=== Weaving and rug making in Shamakhi ===
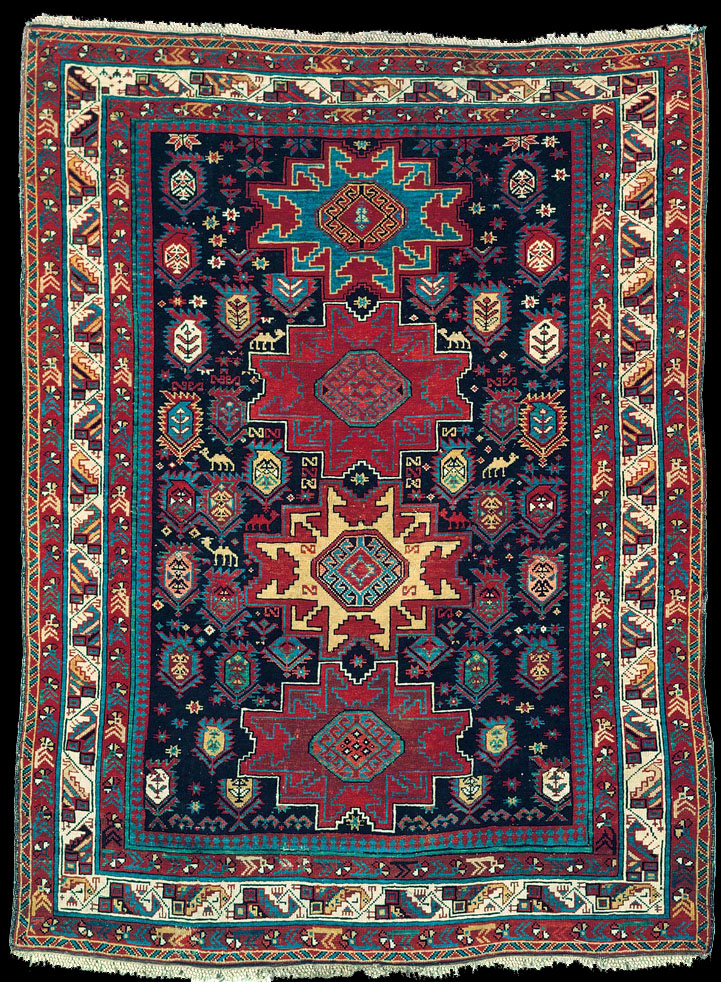
Antique Shirvan rug, Jamjamli village, Shamakhi-Maraza District, Azerbaijan. Late 19th century. State Museum of Azerbaijan Carpet and Applied Art

Historically, Shamakhi was famous for its carpets, whose decoration using the buta motif dominates as with other Shirvan carpets. Shirvan carpets are on display at some of the world's most famous museums. Examples of these are Shirvan (13th century) kept in Istanbul's Turkish and Islamic museum; Shirvan (15th century), kept in the East Region of the Berlin Art Museum; and Shamakhi (17th century) carpets kept in the Pennsylvania Museum of America.

Other artistic products include copper craft, pottery, tailoring, jewelry, woodworking, sculpture, and blacksmithery (blacksmiths were very popular in Alsahab). Also developed in Shamakhi.

== Geography ==
=== Seismicity ===
The city is located in the most seismic area of the Caucasus and was hit by powerful earthquakes in 1191 and 1859, which was so destructive that the capital of Shirvan was transferred to Baku twice. In 1872, the earthquake triggered emigration to Baku, where oil production had started in industrial proportions.

The 1667 earthquake is considered to have been the worst with a death toll of 80,000, with one-third of the city collapsed, according to the Persian merchants' reports. The last catastrophic earthquake was recorded in 1902, which destroyed the 10th-century Juma Mosque. Shamakhi is near the boundary of three plates.

=== Rivers ===
Shamakhi is located in the central part of Shirvan, at an altitude of about 749 m (2,457 ft) above sea level, in a favorable geographical position. In the south, Shamakhi flows to Zongalavay, and in the east, Pirsaatchay. The city is surrounded by Binasli, Gushhan from the north, Pirdiraki, and Maiden Tower-Georgia from the northwest; and the Meysari Mountains from the west. These mountains can be considered as the city's natural defense fortifications. There are many springs that provide the urban population and people of surrounding villages with drinking water because of located at the slopes of the Caucasus Mountains.

=== Climate ===
Shamakhi is a relatively humid city to its area, and has a Mediterranean climate (Csa). With a nice amount of precipitation throughout most of the year, and two relatively dry summer months.

Climate data for Shamakhi
Month	Jan	Feb	Mar	Apr	May	Jun	Jul	Aug	Sep	Oct	Nov	Dec	Year
Mean daily maximum °C (°F)	3.7 (38.7)	4.1 (39.4)	8.2 (46.8)	16.4 (61.5)	21.2 (70.2)	25.8 (78.4)	29.8 (85.6)	28.8 (83.8)	24.2 (75.6)	16.7 (62.1)	10.7 (51.3)	6.4 (43.5)	16.3 (61.3)
Daily mean °C (°F)	−0.1 (31.8)	0.6 (33.1)	3.9 (39.0)	10.8 (51.4)	15.6 (60.1)	19.9 (67.8)	23.7 (74.7)	22.8 (73.0)	18.3 (64.9)	11.1 (52.0)	6.0 (42.8)	2.6 (36.7)	11.3 (52.3)
Mean daily minimum °C (°F)	−3.0 (26.6)	−2.5 (27.5)	0.8 (33.4)	6.7 (44.1)	11.2 (52.2)	15.4 (59.7)	18.4 (65.1)	17.6 (63.7)	13.7 (56.7)	8.1 (46.6)	3.9 (39.0)	−0.8 (30.6)	7.5 (45.5)
Average precipitation mm (inches)	42 (1.7)	45 (1.8)	73 (2.9)	69 (2.7)	74 (2.9)	54 (2.1)	21 (0.8)	19 (0.7)	36 (1.4)	73 (2.9)	49 (1.9)	40 (1.6)	595 (23.4)
Average rainy days	8	10	12	8	9	6	3	3	5	9	8	7	88
Mean monthly sunshine hours	103.1	92.5	112.8	179.7	211.8	258.7	279.4	252.8	211.8	152.3	110.7	113.7	2,079.3
Source: NOAA

== Demographics ==
=== Ethnic groups ===
From the 16th century up until the 18th century, Armenians in Shamakhi formed the majority of the population. According to the 1917 publication of Kavkazskiy kalendar, Shamakhi—then known as Shemakha—had a population of 27,732 in 1916, including 14,811 men and 12,941 women, 27,259 of whom were the permanent population and 493 were temporary residents. Its ethnoreligious composition was as follows:

Nationality	Number	%
Shia Muslims	12,522	45.12
Sunni Muslims	8,605	31.01
Armenians	4,534	16.34
Russians	1,737	6.26
North Caucasians	214	0.77
Jews	136	0.49
Other Europeans	4	0.01
TOTAL	27,752	100.00

The majority of the population is Azerbaijani, while Russians, Lezgins and Tats constitute other minorities. They speak the Azerbaijani language, Russian language, Lezgian language and Tat language respectively.

=== Religion ===
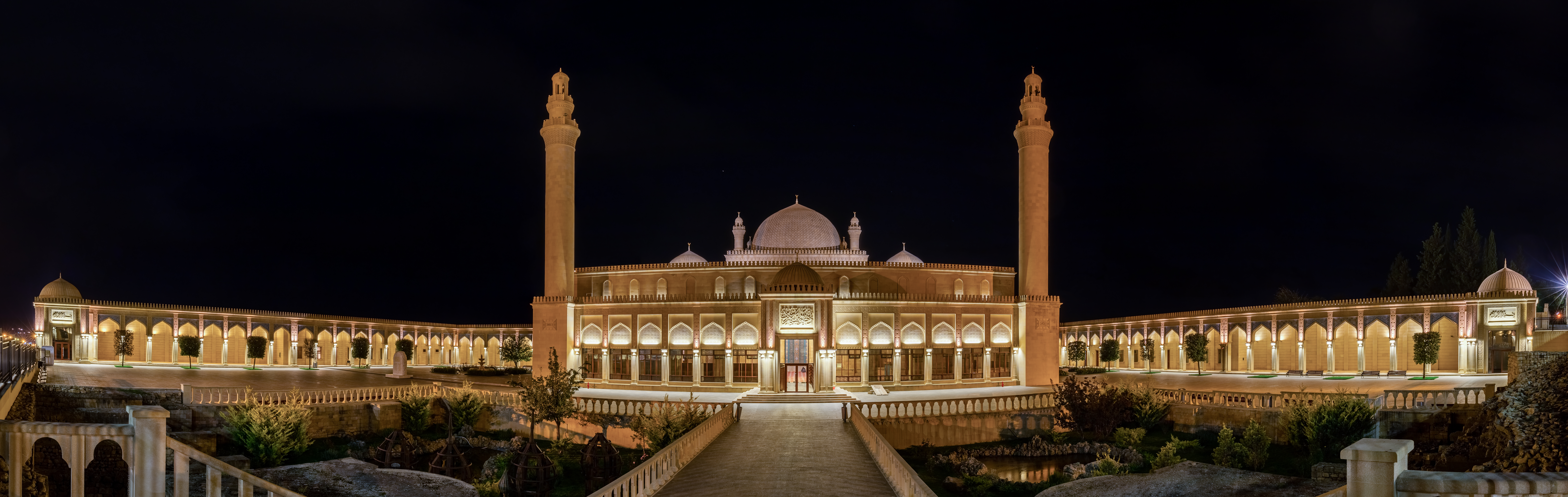
Panoramic night view

The Juma Mosque of Shamakhi is the biggest religious building in the city. Through its history the mosque has been demolished or destroyed a few times, but each time it has been rebuilt, most recently in 2009. It is the oldest mosque in the territory of Azerbaijan, and was built in 743–744. It is second in age in the South Caucasus after the Derbent Juma mosque (built in 734). The mosque was registered by the Ministry of Culture and Tourism of the Republic of Azerbaijan as a historical and cultural monument of the country.

The mosque was restored several times in the Middle Ages. Century, during the Shamakhi earthquakes in 1856 and 1902, was destroyed. The first reconstruction was done by Gasim Hajibababayov and later by Iosif Ploško. The last restoration work at the mosque was carried out in 2010–2013.

== Economy ==
After the Decree "On measures to accelerate socio-economic development in the Republic of Azerbaijan", signed by Ilham Aliyev on 24 November 2003 and the "State Program on Socio-Economic Development of the Regions of the Republic of Azerbaijan" approved by the head of state, began to increase living standards in Shamakhi along with other regions.

Thus, at Shamakhi carpet shop where were installed 40 pieces of machine tools, which belongs to "Star" LTD, weave carpets such as "Guba-Shirvan", "Nakhchivan", "Garabagh" and "Tabriz". In 2005, at the Shamakhi TV Production Plant built by "Star" LTD, "Star" branded 37, 54, 72, 74 "LCD", "Plasma", "CV" and digital "Receivers" are produced based on spare parts of Toshiba "VCD"."Star" LTD has invested $10 million in the construction of the AzSamand mini-car production plant.

The building of the Historical-Ethnographic Museum named S.Shirvani was renovated and the bust of 12 great figures from the Shamakhi region was laid in the yard of the museum.

== Culture ==
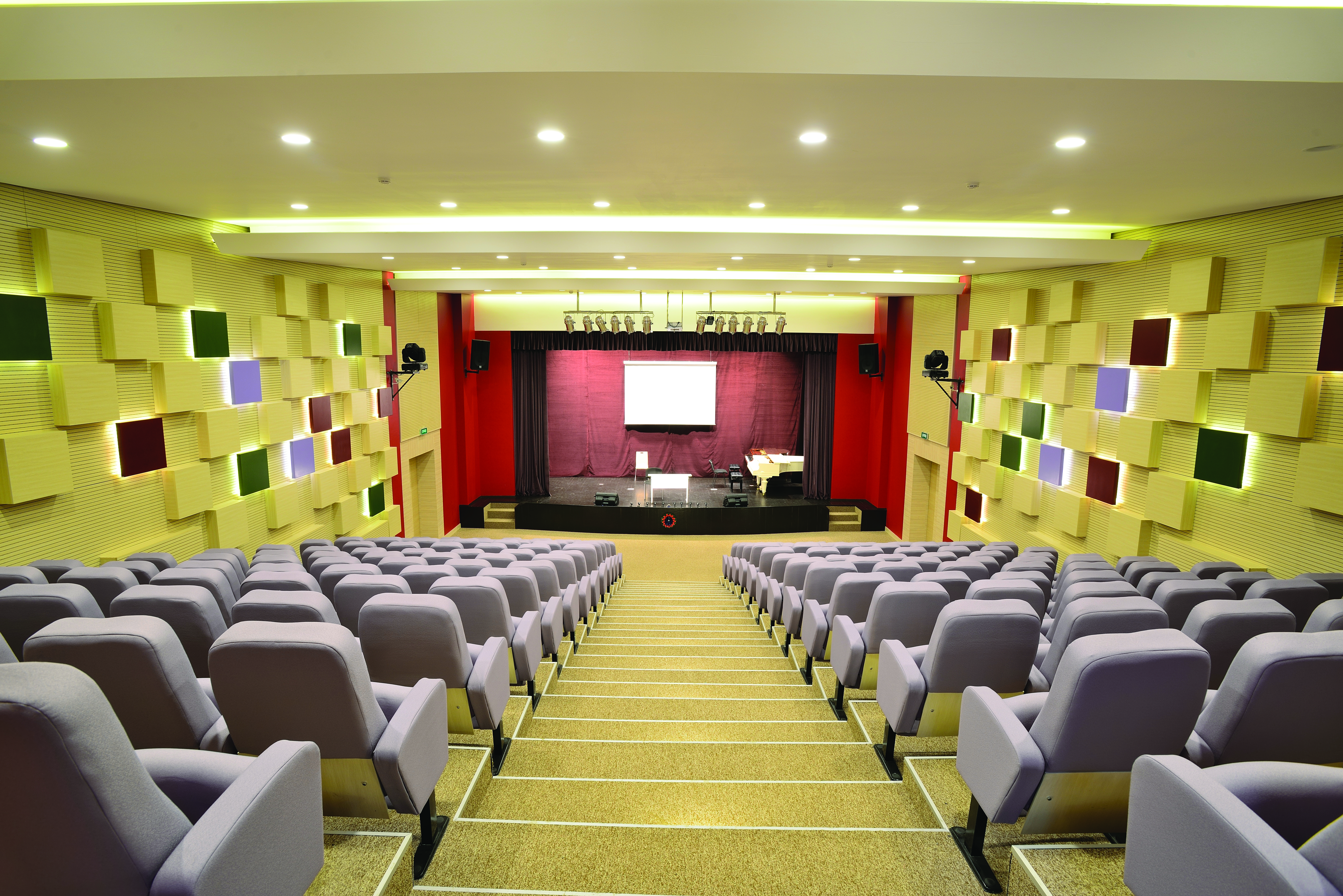
Shamakhi Children's Creative Centre

In the 19th century the town became famous due Shamakhi dancers, the principal dancers of the entertainment groups, similarly to tawaifs. The city is home to Shirvan Domes, a 15th-century mausoleum and graveyard located at the foot of Gulustan Fortress.

=== Music and media ===
One can trace the music scene in Shamakhi back to ancient times and to the villages of Baku, generally revered as the fountainhead of mugham in Azerbaijan.

== Education ==
Shamakhi Humanitarian College and Shamakhi State Industrial and Economics College were merged into Shamakhi State Regional College in 2016.

== International relations ==
=== Twin towns and sister cities ===
Shamakhi is twinned with the following cities:

- Iğdır, Turkey, (since 2006)
- Amasya, Turkey,
- Tirat Carmel, Israel, (since 2017)

== Notable residents ==
The city's notable residents include: philosopher Seyid Yahya Bakuvi, poets Seyid Azim Shirvani, Khaqani and Mirza Alakbar Sabir, mugham singers Alim Qasimov, Yaver Kelenterli and Farghana Qasimova, actors Aghasadyg Garaybeyli and Abbas Mirza Sharifzadeh, architect Gasim bey Hajibababeyov, Armenian playwright and novelist Alexander Shirvanzade, Armenian actor Hovhannes Abelian and others.

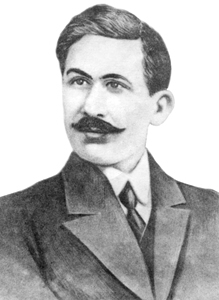
Abbas Sahhat, one of prominent poets in Azerbaijani literature.

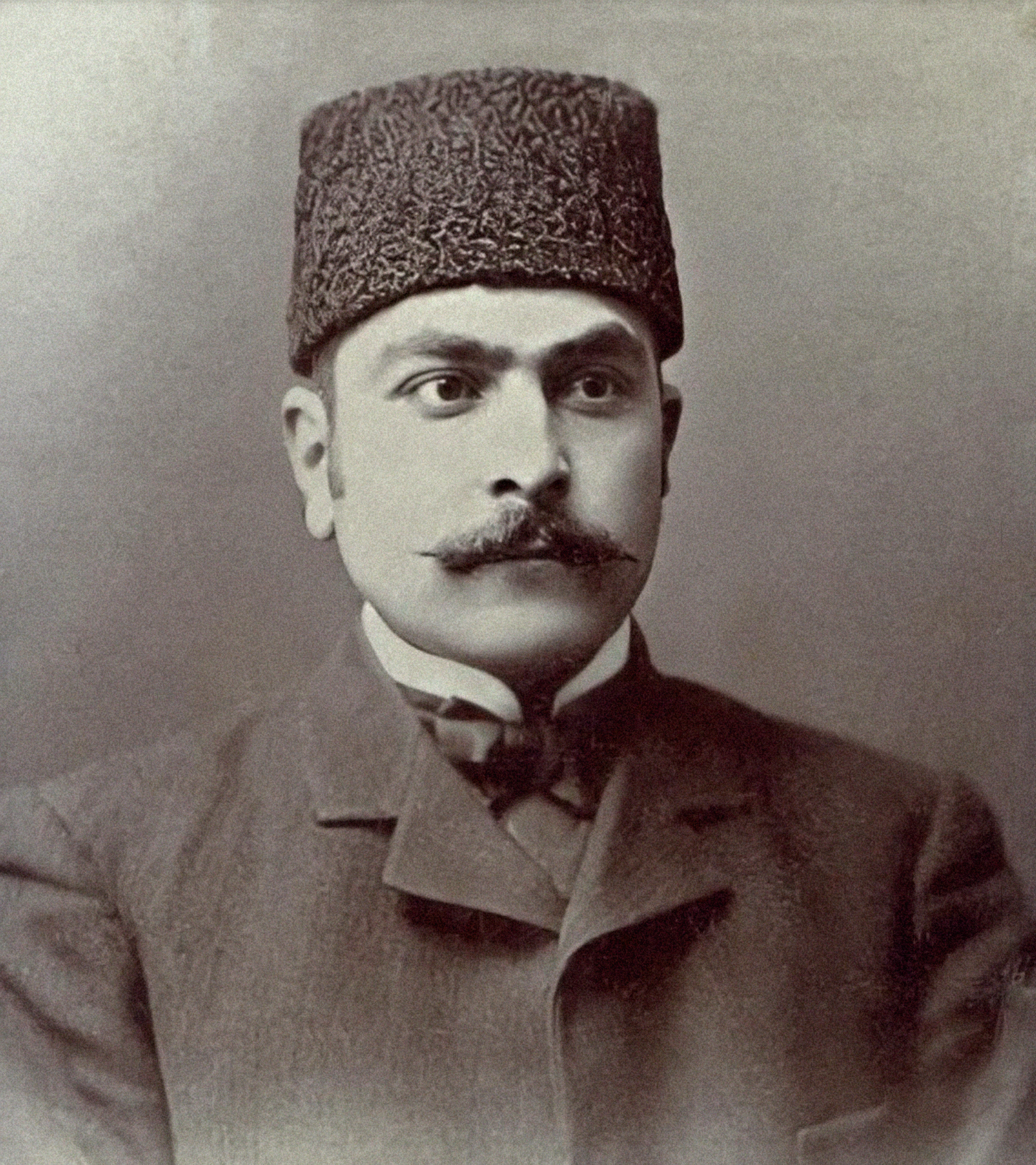
Mahammad Hadi, was an Azerbaijani romanticist poet.

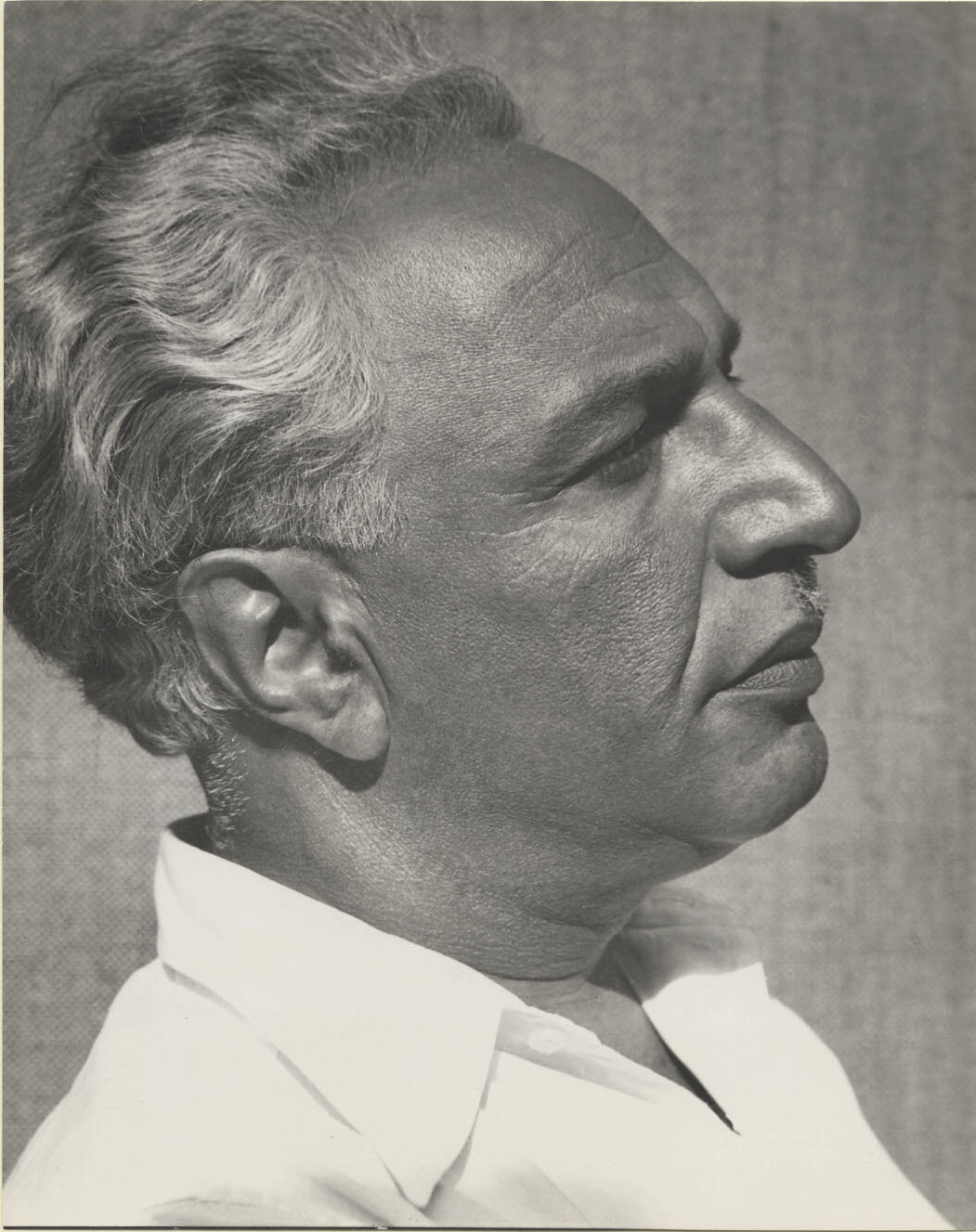
Gostan Zarian, an Armenian writer and poet.

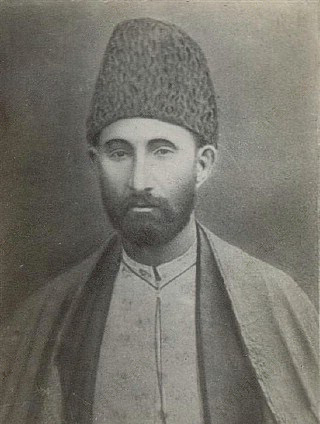
Seyid Azim Shirvani, continued Fuzûlî's traditions in his love-lyrical poems.

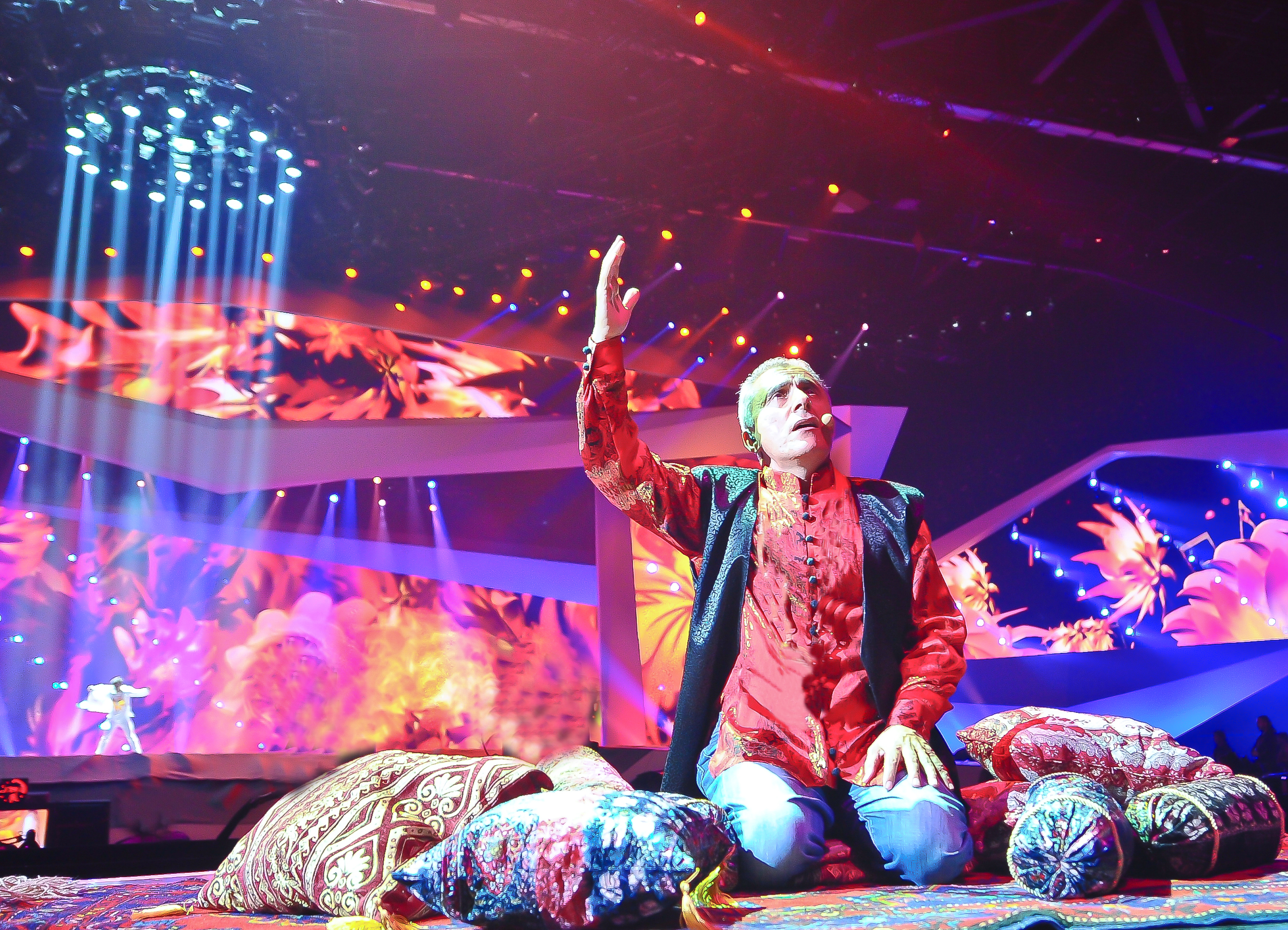
Alim Qasimov, UNESCO Music Prize winning mugham singer.

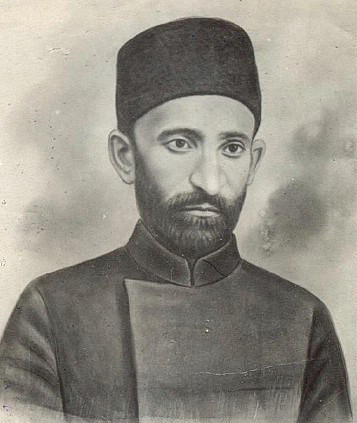
Mirza Alakbar Sabir, one of the founders of the satirical trend in Azerbaijani literature.

== Gallery ==
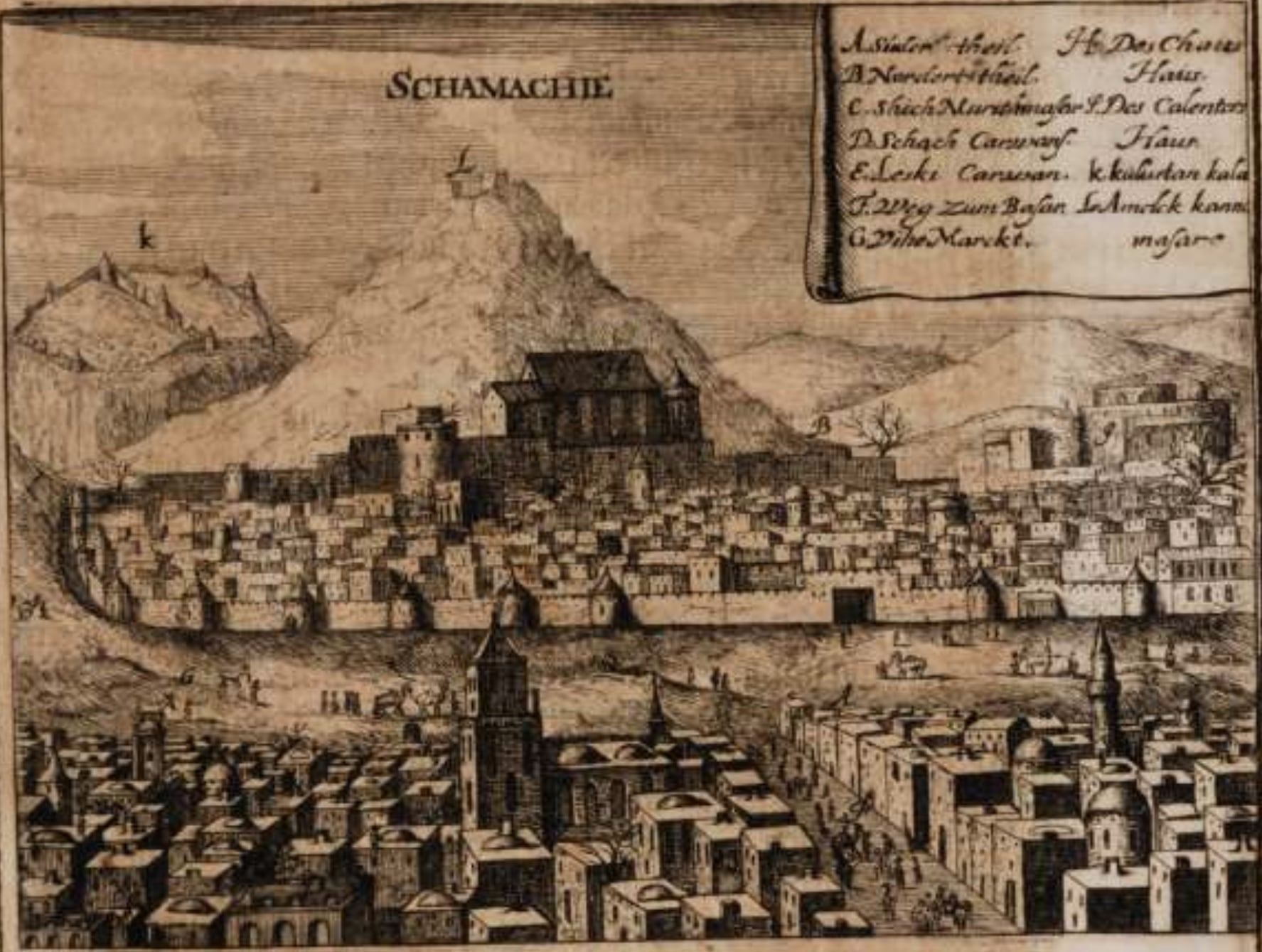
Şamaxı in 1656. From Adam Olearius book

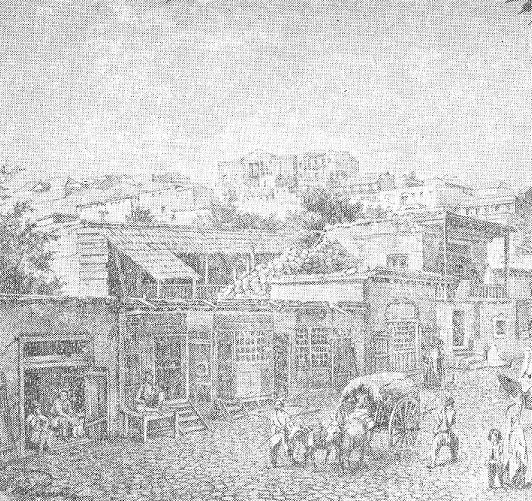
Şamaxı in 1849

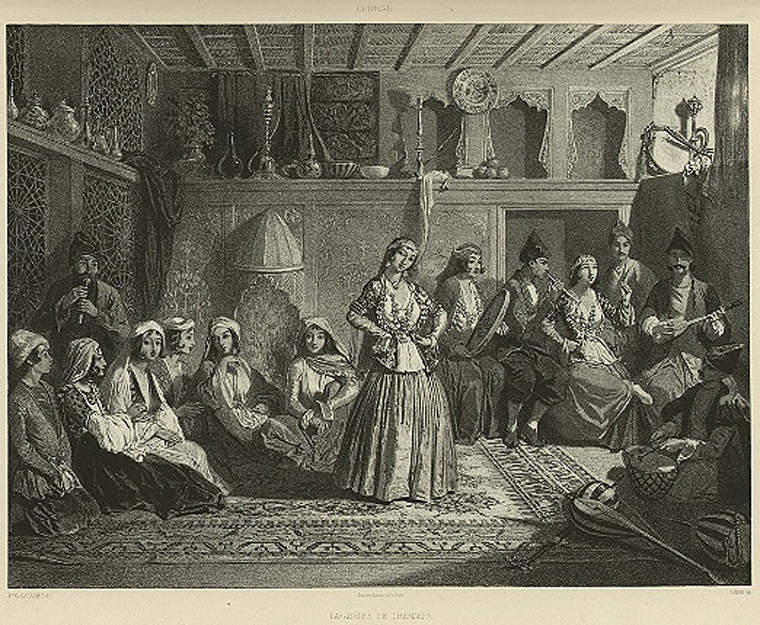
Şamaxı female dancers by Grigory Gagarin, 1847

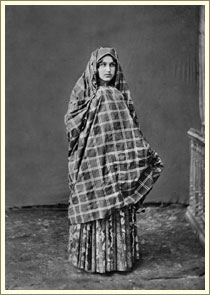
Young Azeri girl from Şamaxı, 1883

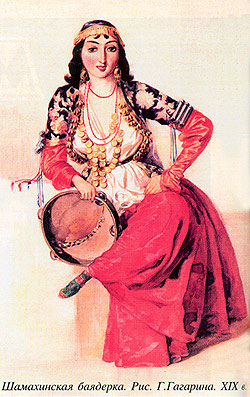
Azerbaijani woman from Şamaxı in the 19th century

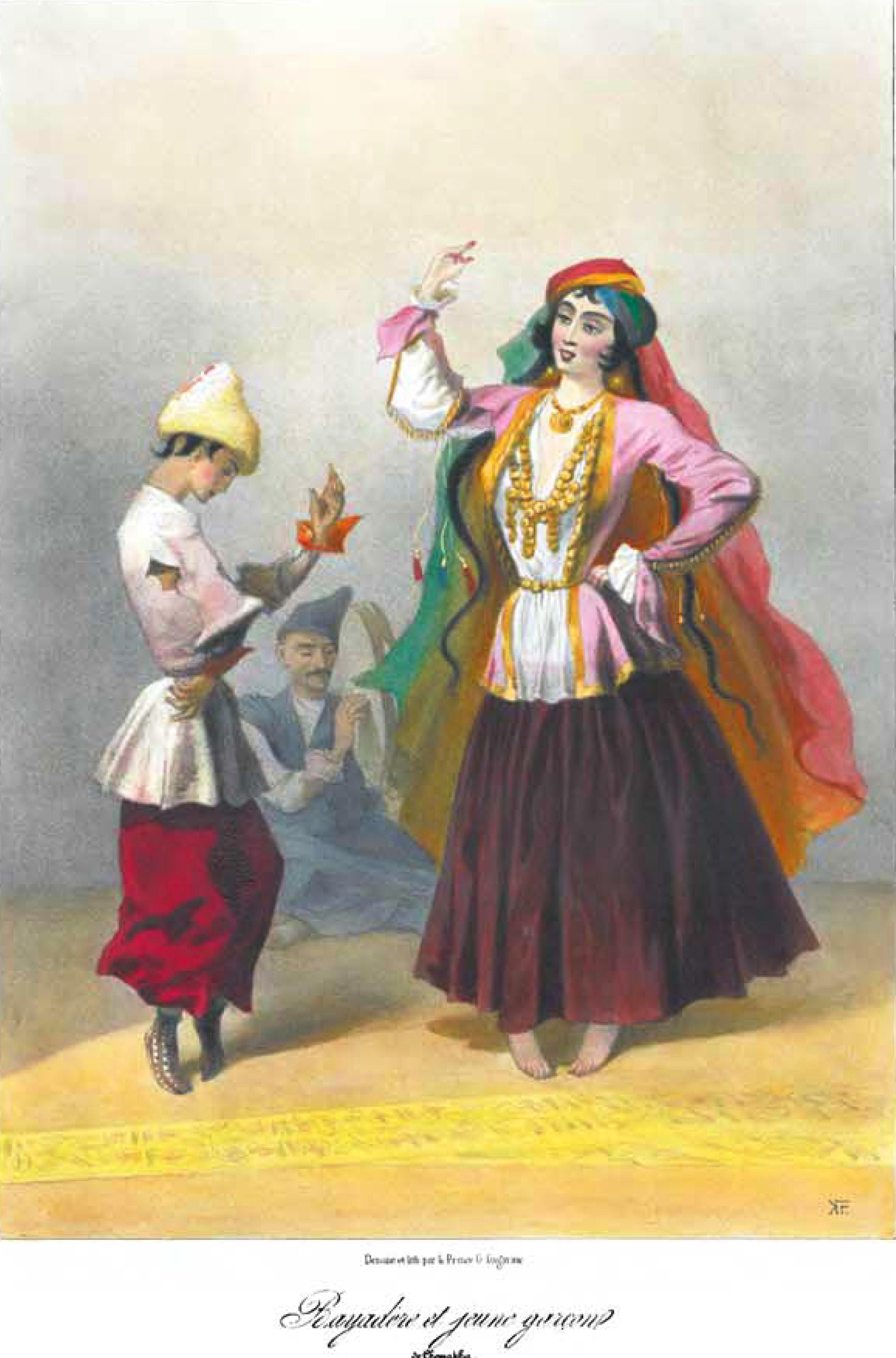
Dancing in Şamaxı by Grigory Gagarin, 1840

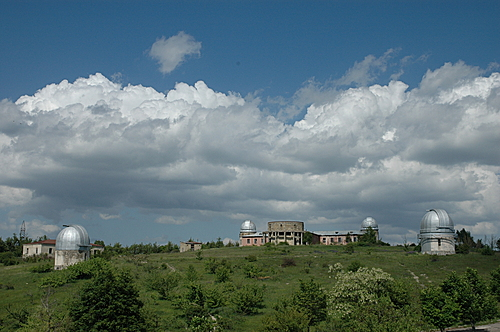
Shamakhi Astrophysical Observatory

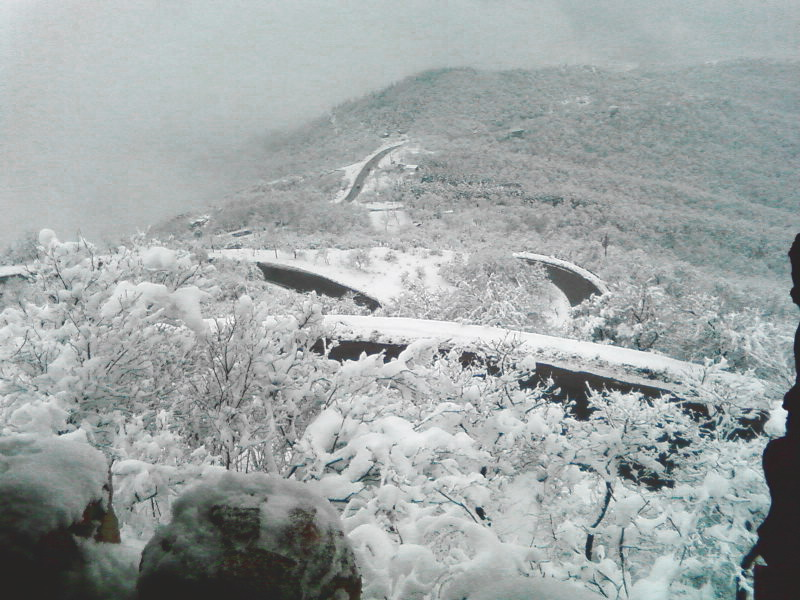
Şamaxı pass in winter

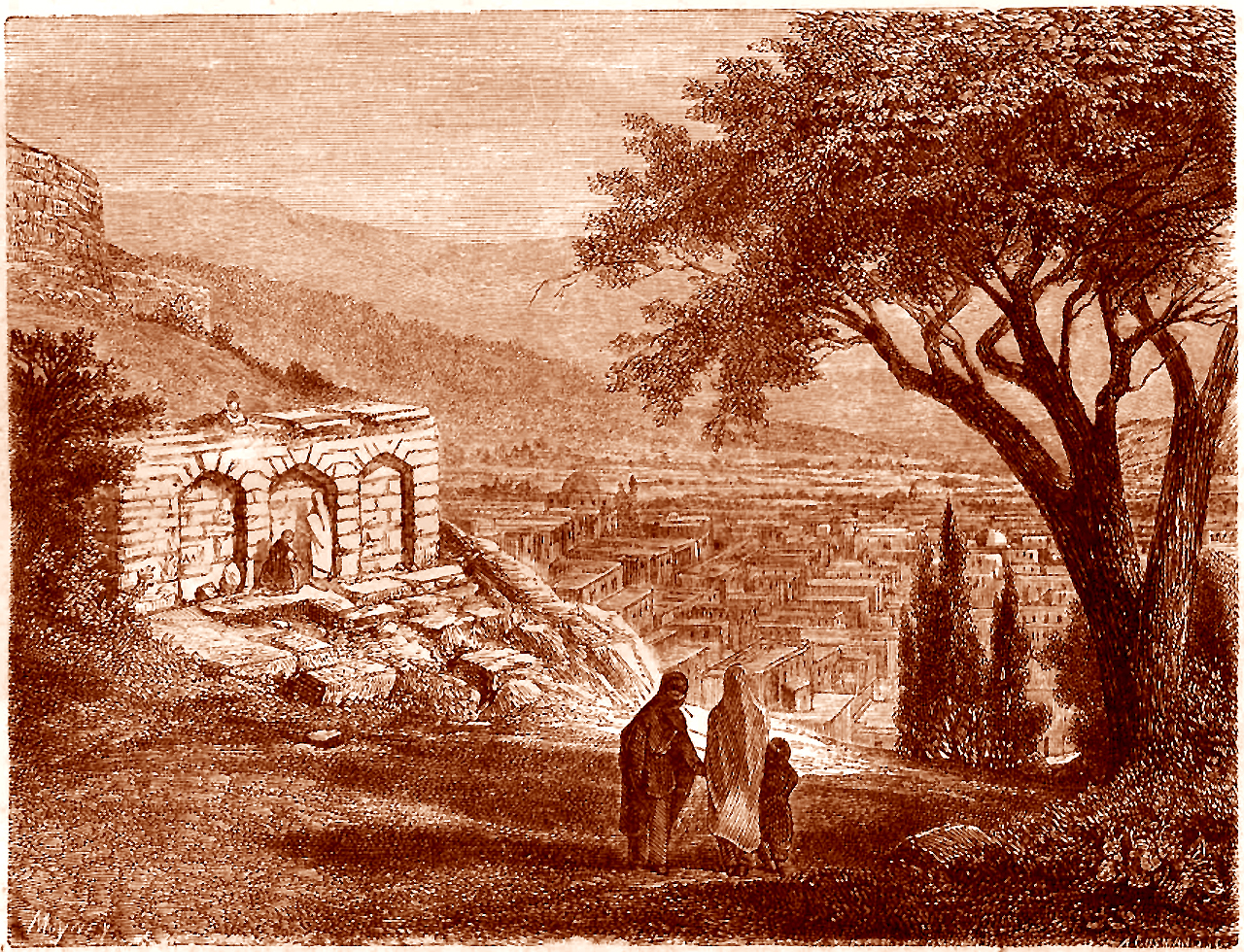
Shamakhi in 19th century

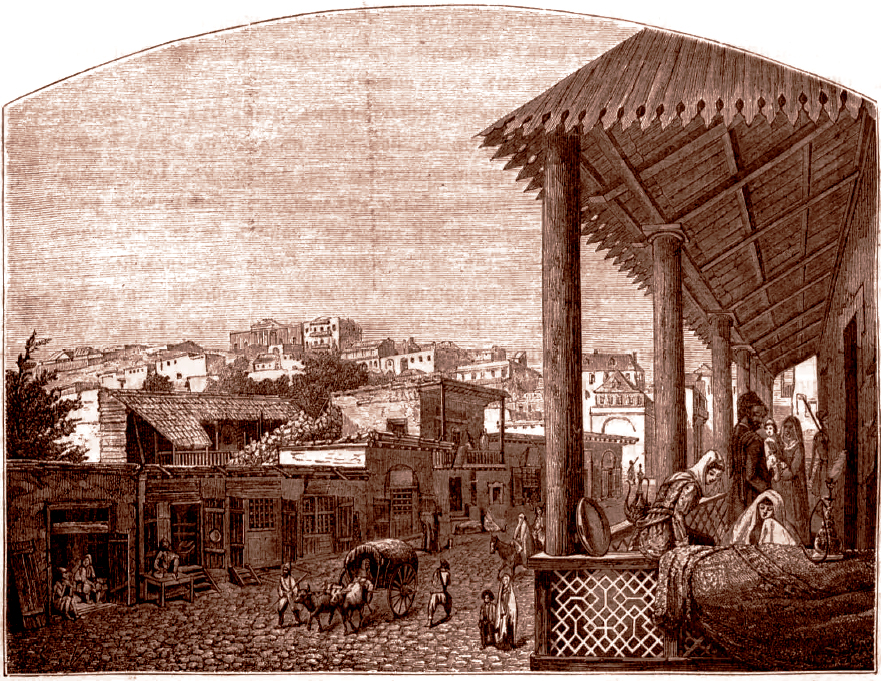
Shamakhi in 19th century

Multi-apartment buildings

Kindergarten

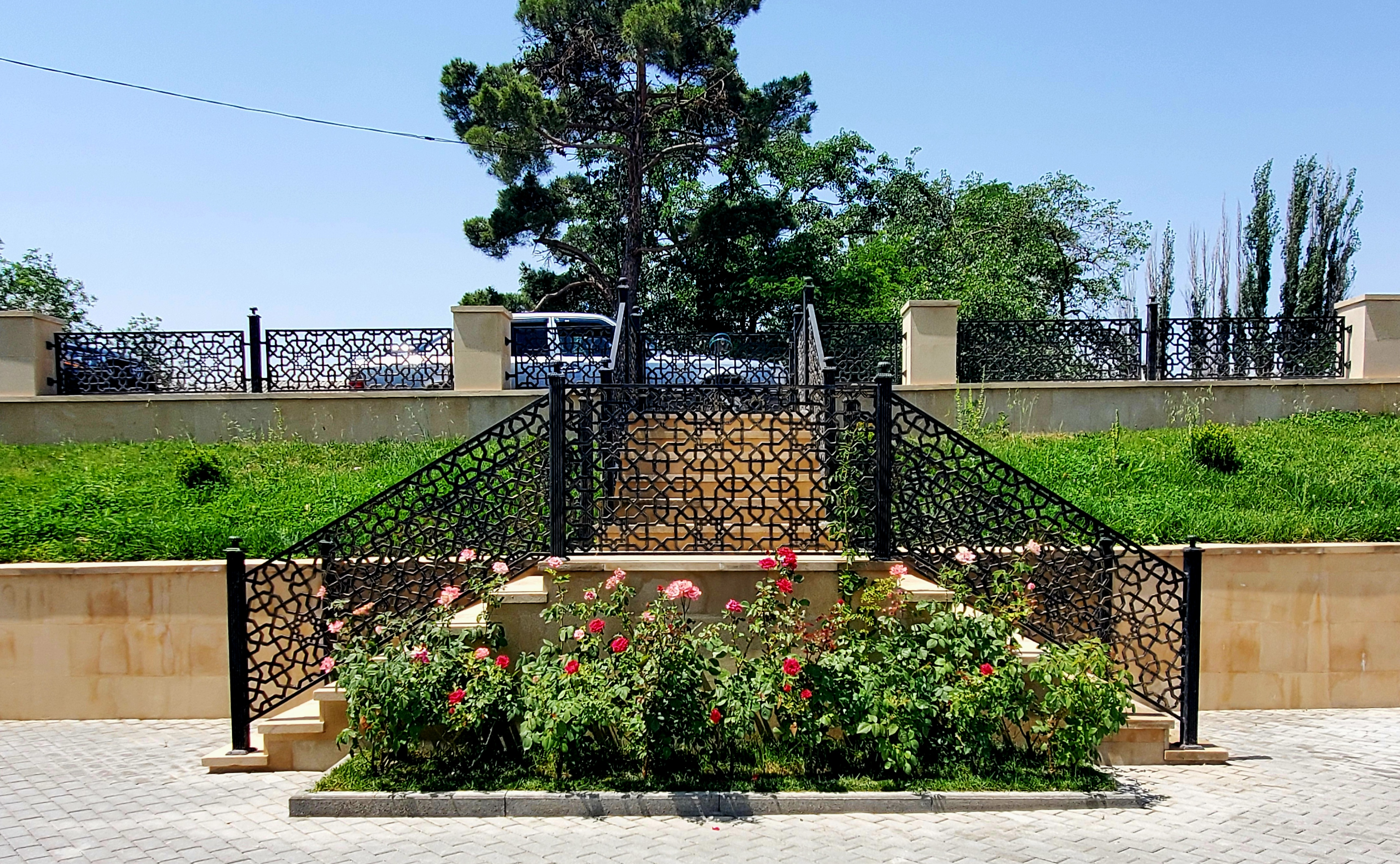
Pirsaat Baba

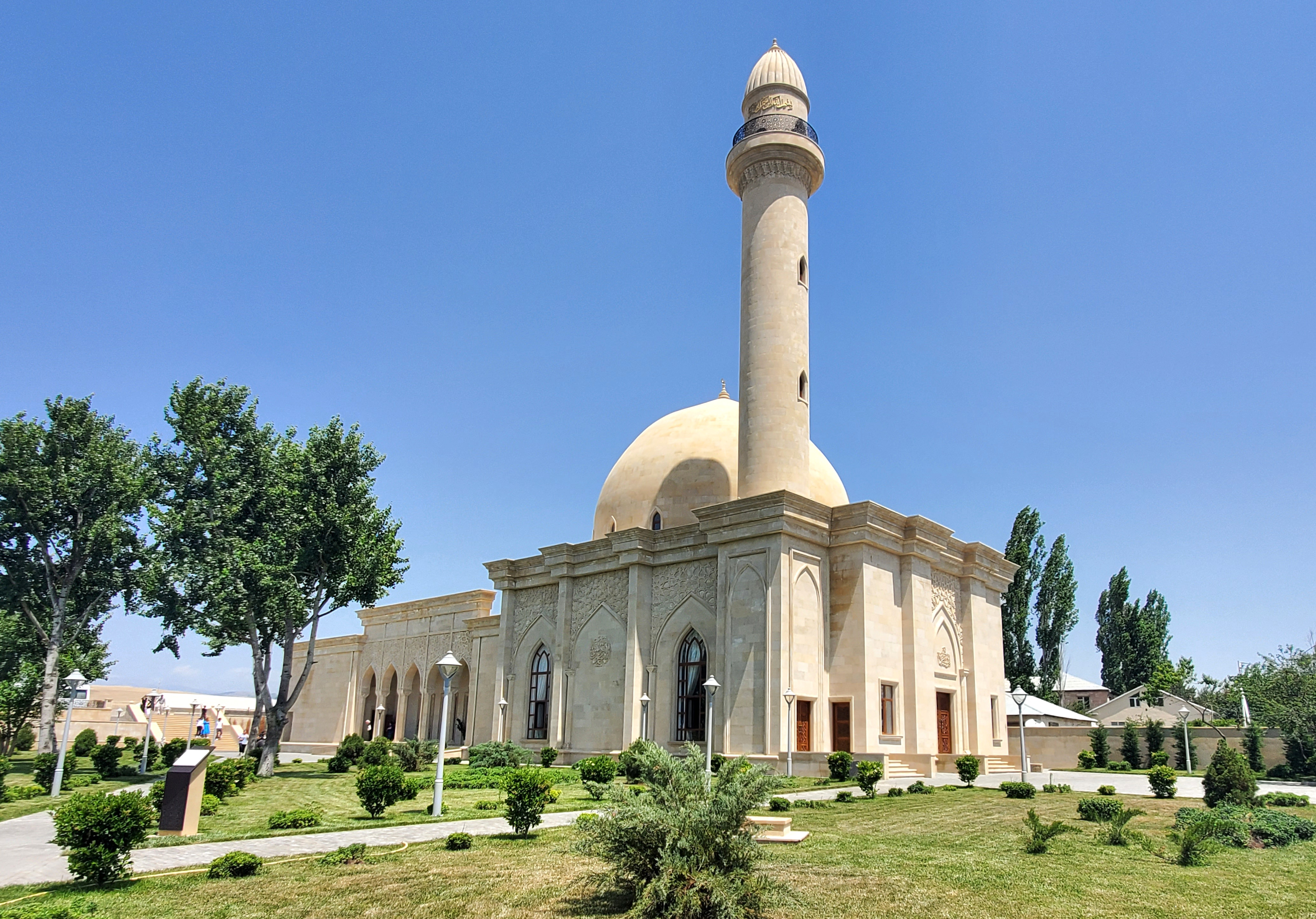
Pirsaat Baba Mosque

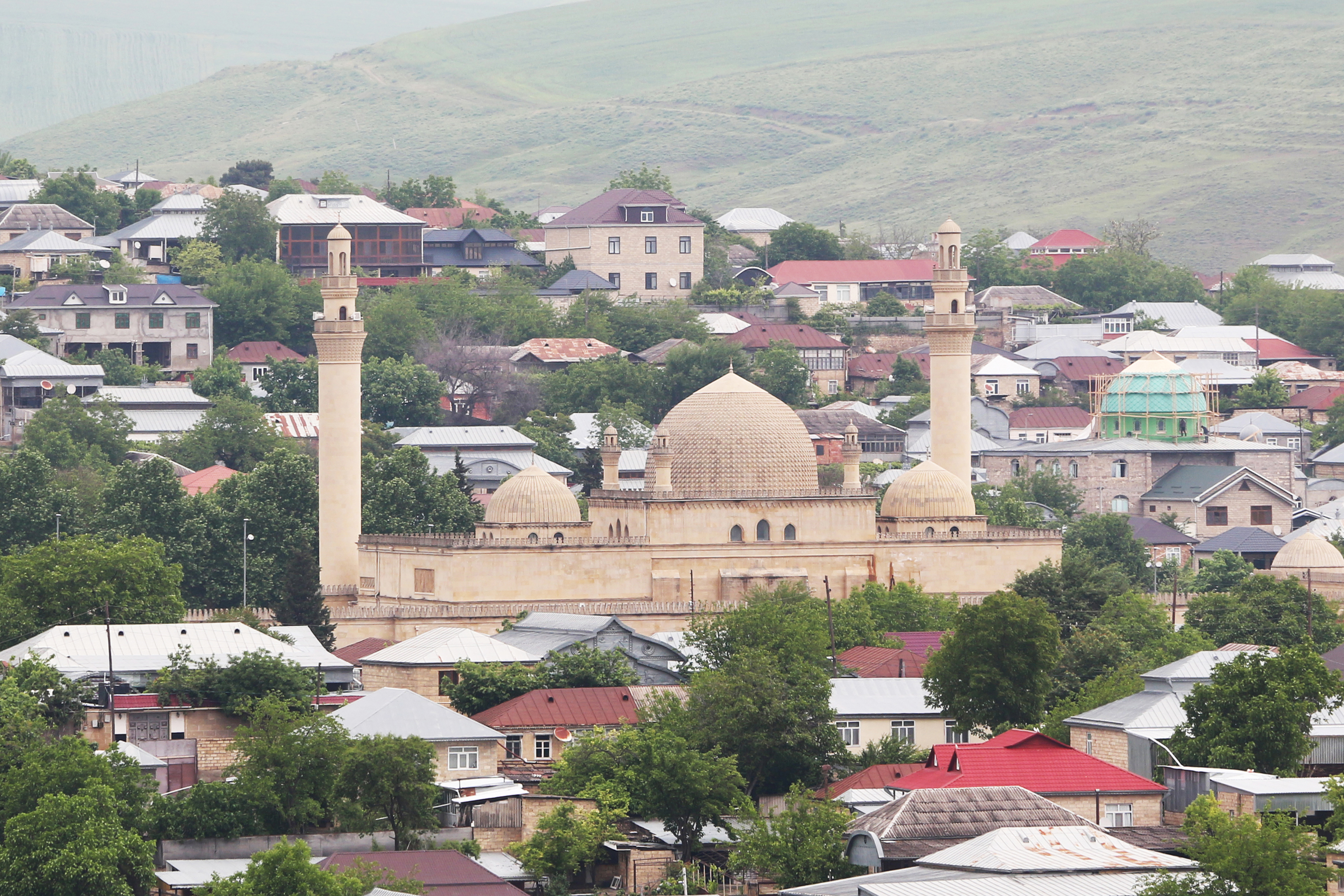
Friday Mosque of Şamaxı

== See also ==
- Lankaran
- Qabala
- Ganja, Azerbaijan
- Shamakhi Astrophysical Observatory
- Armenians in Shamakhi
- Shamakhi Fortress

== Sources ==
- Axworthy, Michael (2010). The Sword of Persia: Nader Shah, from Tribal Warrior to Conquering Tyrant. I.B.Tauris. ISBN 978-0857721938.
- Fisher, William Bayne; Avery, P.; Hambly, G. R. G; Melville, C. (1986). The Cambridge History of Iran. Vol. 6. Cambridge: Cambridge University Press. ISBN 978-0521200943.
- Fisher, William Bayne; Avery, P.; Hambly, G. R. G; Melville, C. (1991). The Cambridge History of Iran. Vol. 7. Cambridge: Cambridge University Press. ISBN 978-0521200950.
- Matthee, Rudolph P. (2005). The Pursuit of Pleasure: Drugs and Stimulants in Iranian History, 1500–1900. Princeton University Press. ISBN 978-0691118550.
