= Armen Ohanian =

Armenian dancer, actor and writer

- Սոֆյա Էմանուելի Փիրբուդաղյան
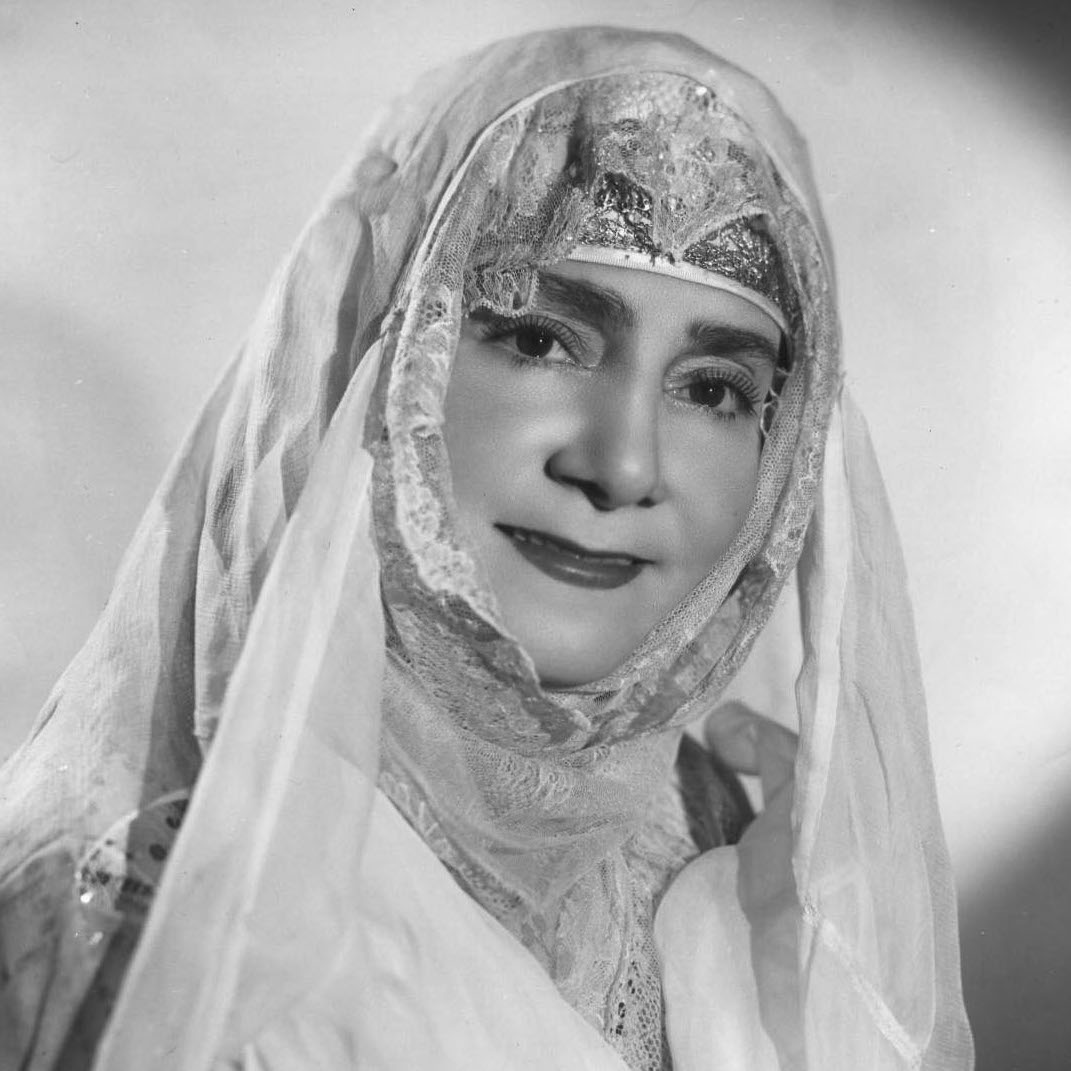
- Ohanian in 1910
- Born: Sophia Pirboudaghian; 1888; Shamakha, Russian Empire (now in Azerbaijan)
- Died: 1976; Mexico City, Mexico
- Occupations: Dancer, actress, writer, and translator
- Years active: 1906–1969
- Spouse(s): Haik Ter-Ohanian (m. 1905; div. 1906); Makedonio Garza (m. 1922)

Armen Ohanian (Armenian: Արմեն Օհանյան), born Sophia Pirboudaghian (Armenian: Սոֆյա Էմանուելի Փիրբուդաղյան, 1888–1976) was an Armenian dancer, actress, writer, and translator. Described as a "woman of the world," she bridged multiple cultures through her work in the Caucasus, Persia, France, and Mexico.

== Biography ==
=== Early life in the Caucasus ===
Armen Ohanian was born in Shamakha, then part of the Russian Empire (now in Azerbaijan) to an upper-class Armenian family, in 1888. Her father, Emanuel Pirboudaghian, was a prosperous man whose family traditions were deeply rooted in the mountains. In her autobiography, The Dancer of Shamahka, she describes her earliest years in the village of Zergueran, where she was raised under the strict, silent gaze of her elders. She noted that in her culture, children were taught that "silence is the ornament of the young," and she grew up surrounded by sisters—Khatoun, Helen, and Anitchka—in a world where religious disputes between the "Old" and "New" Armenian churches were a primary topic of adult conversation.

A devastating earthquake in 1902 destroyed her home and forced her family to move to Baku. Ohanian found the transition from the "flowering" Shamakha to the "black, oily" Baku difficult. She was enrolled in a Russian school, an institution she described as a "nightmare" that sought to strip Armenian children of their native identity and language.

=== The 1905 pogroms and first marriage ===
In 1905, Ohanian witnessed the anti-Armenian pogroms in Baku. She recounted the horror of hiding in cellars while hearing the cries of the dying outside, an experience that claimed the life of her father and left her family in a state of terror. To provide her with security in the wake of this tragedy, she was hurriedly married at a young age to Haik Ter-Ohanian, an Armenian doctor with connections in Iran. The marriage was unsuccessful; Ohanian struggled with the restrictive role of a "little housewife" and the expectations of her mother-in-law. The union ended in separation within a year, an act that led to her being socially ostracized by her community.

=== Artistic awakening in Persia ===
Following her separation, she moved to Persia (modern-day Iran), settling first in Resht and then Tehran. She began her acting career as Sophia Ter-Ohanian in 1906, but it was in Persia that she fully developed her identity as a dancer. She found refuge among a group of Muslim women who taught her the traditional "Oriental" dances of the region. During the Iranian Constitutional Revolution, she became a cultural pioneer, founding the Persian National Theater and organizing galas where Iranian women were permitted to attend public performances for the first time. In May 1910, she produced and directed Nikolai Gogol's The Government Inspector in Persian, playing the role of Maria Antonovna.

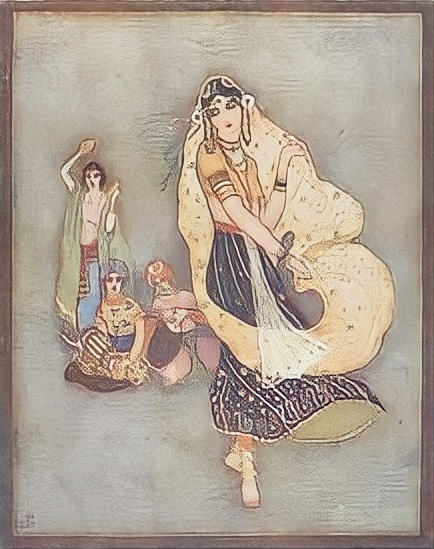
Depiction of Armen Ohanian on the Spanish edition of the book Dancers of Shamakha, 1921

Ohanian's autobiography provides extensive detail on the lives of Persian women during this era. She described the "anderoon" (women's quarters) as a place of both immense beauty and stifling boredom, where women lived in a state of perpetual "waiting." Her performances for the Royal Court and the Shah allowed her a unique vantage point into the shifting political landscape of Persia as it moved toward a constitutional government.

=== International success as a dancer ===
In 1911, Ohanian traveled to London, a move she described with deep nostalgia and "soul-sickness," as she felt she was leaving the "soul of Asia" for the "ugly, colorless" West. From then to the late 1920s, she became a sensation in the Western cultural scene, fueled by the era's craze for exoticism. Utilizing "free dance" methods similar to those of Isadora Duncan, she choreographed routines based on Armenian and Iranian music. Regarding her persona, Ohanian remarked: "I understood that a dancer is more than a woman; she is a dream, and to preserve that, she must show the world only her unreal self."

Her repertoire included "Salome," "At the Temple of Anahit," and "The Great Khan of Shamakha." She performed "wonderful Persian Dances" in a production of Lakmé at the London Opera House in 1915. She performed extensively in London, Paris, Brussels, Milan, and the United States. While she was hailed as a "great artist" by contemporaries like Anatole France, modern critics often note that her work navigated a complex line between cultural innovation and catering to orientalist fetishes.

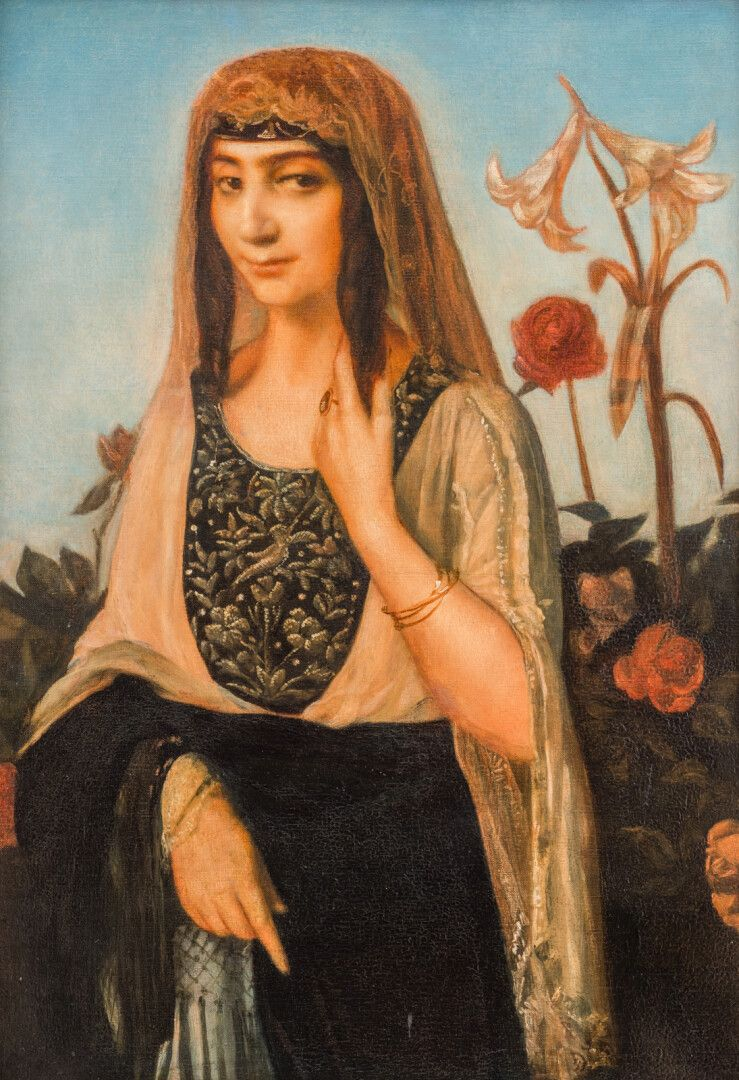
Portrait of Armen Ohanian by Émile Bernard, 1913

=== Personal life in Paris and Mexico ===
Settling in Paris in 1912, Ohanian turned toward literature. Her first book, The Dancer of Shamahka, was published in 1918 in French. She was known to be bisexual and engaged in relationships with several prominent figures of the Belle Époque, including painter Émile Bernard, writer Maurice Barrès, and American author Natalie Barney.

She married her second husband, Mexican economist Makedonio Garza, in 1922. The couple eventually settled in Mexico in 1934. In modern scholarship, Ohanian's adoption of a masculine-gendered name and her public subversion of traditional Armenian gender roles have led researchers to describe her as genderqueer.

=== Later life and political activism ===
In Mexico, Ohanian founded a dance school in 1936 and became an active member of the Mexican Communist Party. She translated numerous Russian works into Spanish and published Happy Armenia in 1946. She remained a prolific author until 1969 and made a final visit to the Soviet Union in 1958, where she donated part of her private archives to the Charents Museum of Literature and Arts. She died in Mexico City in 1976 at the age of 89.

== See also ==
- Shamakhi dancers
