= Shamakhi dancers =

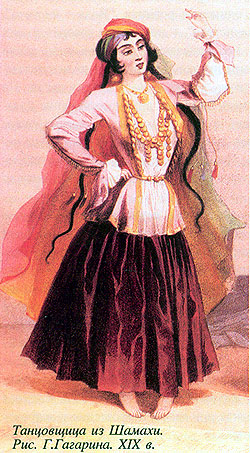
A dancer from Shamakhi. G.Gagarin, mid-19th century

The Shamakhi dancers (Azerbaijani: Şamaxı rəqqasələri; Armenian: Շամախի պարողներ) were the principal dancers of the entertainment groups that existed in Shamakhi (in modern Azerbaijan) up to the late 19th century. These groups worked similarly to tawaifs.

== Depictions ==
Russian painter Grigory Gagarin who lived in the Caucasus in 1840–1855 depicted the Shamakhi dancers in a series of paintings, in which he referred to them as bayaderki (баядерки; sg. bayaderka – баядерка; originally the Portuguese term balliadera borrowed into Russian and other European languages via French (bayadère) and initially used to refer to the devadasi.)

The extant documents regarding the Shamakhi dancers, and dances, are very limited. In literature, Shamakhi dancers are referred to in Comte de Gobineau's novel The dancing girl of Shamakha and other Asiatic tales.

The Dancer of Shamakha recounts the life of Armenian dancer Armen Ohanian, her education as a dancer, her childhood in Russia, and her travels in Iran and Egypt. It was published in French as La Danseuse de Shamakha in 1918 and translated into English in 1923 by Rose Wilder. After moving to Europe, Ohanian danced traditional dances for audiences, gave lectures on poetry, and was an active member in intellectual and political circles. She eventually moved to Mexico. She is the author of some 15 publications including autobiographical volumes and books on culture and politics.

== See also ==
- Azerbaijani dances
- Armenian dances
- Azerbaijani ballet

== Sources ==
- Joseph Arthur Comte de Gobineau, The dancing girl of Shamakha and other Asiatic tales, authorized translation by Helen Morgenthau Fox, 340 p. (Harcourt, Brace and Company, New York, 1926), OCLC 220571590; 368 p. (Kessinger Publishing, Montana, 2007), ISBN 1-4325-7982-7
- Ohanian, Armen. La Danseuse de Shamakha. Foreword by Anatole France. Paris: Bernard Grasset, 1918
