= Şirvan, Shamakhi =

Shirvan Զարխու • Zarkhu
- Azerbaijani: Şirvan
- Location within Azerbaijan
- Coordinates: 40°39′18″N 48°30′55″E
- Country: Azerbaijan
- District: Shamakhi
- Time zone: UTC+4 (AZT)

Shirvan (Azerbaijani: Şirvan, Armenian: Զարխու, romanized: Zarkhu or Շիրվանզադե, Shirvanzade) and until 1994 as Khoylu (Azerbaijani: Xoylu), is a village in the Shamakhi District of Azerbaijan. This village had a generally homogeneous Armenian population in 1918 and maintained an Armenian majority up until the forced exodus of Armenians from Azerbaijan in 1988.
