= Mirasgar Seyidov =

- Mirəsgər Seyidov
- Mirasgar Seyidov - National Hero of Azerbaijan
- Born: February 6, 1970; Garakhanbeyli, Nakhchivan, Nakhchivan AR, Azerbaijan SSR, Soviet Union
- Died: June 14, 1992 (aged 22); Yuxarı Buzqov, Babek District, Nakhchivan AR, Azerbaijan
- Burial place: Nakhchivan, Azerbaijan
- Occupation: Military
- Awards: National Hero of Azerbaijan; 1992

Mirasgar Mirabdulla oghlu Seyidov (Azerbaijani: Mirəsgər Mirabdulla oğlu Seyidov) (6 February 1970 – 14 June 1992) - National Hero of Azerbaijan was born on February 6, 1970, in the Garakhanbeyli village of the Nakhchivan city of Nakhchivan Autonomous Republic of Azerbaijan.

== Life ==
Mirasgar Seyidov worked in his own village after finishing secondary school in 1987. He returned to Nakhchivan after being dismissed from the Soviet Army in 1990.

== In Battles ==
The First Nagorno-Karabakh War did not pass by Nakhchivan either. Armenian forces started attacking villages of Nakhchivan constantly. But all the attacks were prevented by the voluntary self-defense groups and Mirasgar Seyidov was one of them who voluntarily enlisted in the self-defense battalion of Yuxarı Buzqov village. He was fighting within this battalion. He showed extreme courage in all the battles. His last battle took place on 14 June 1992. He was severely wounded and died while saving one of the wounded soldiers.

== Family ==
He was single.

== Awards ==
He was posthumously awarded the title of National Hero of Azerbaijan by decree 367 of the president of Azerbaijan Republic on 18 December 1992.

School #15 in Nakhchivan city where he once studied was renamed after him.

He is buried in the Alley of Martyrs in Nakhchivan city.
