= Cəhriçay =

River in the Caucasus region

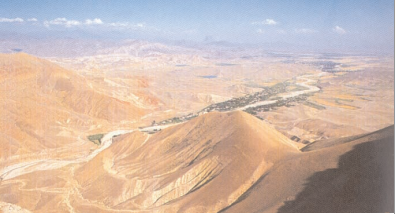

Location
- Country: Azerbaijan

Physical characteristics
- Mouth: Naxçıvançay
  - coordinates: 39.2901°N 45.4515°E
- Length: 45 km (28 mi)
- Basin size: 442 km^{2} (171 sq mi)

Basin features
- Progression: Naxçıvançay→ Aras→ Kura→ Caspian Sea

The Cəhriçay (Russian: Джагричай Dzhagrichay) is a river in the Babek District (Nakhchivan Autonomous Republic) in Azerbaijan. The river is 45 kilometres (28 mi) long and has a basin area of 442 square kilometres (171 mi^{2}). Its source is in the Daralayaz mountains at an elevation of 2,320 metres (7,610 ft). It is a right tributary of the Naxçıvançay, itself a tributary of the Aras. The water sources of the Cəhriçay are snow, rain and groundwater. The river is mostly used for irrigation. It flows through the village Cəhri.
