= Yuxarı Leninabad =

Yukhary Leninabad
- Location within Azerbaijan
- Coordinates: 39°16′N 45°29′E
- Country: Azerbaijan
- Autonomous republic: Nakhchivan
- District: Babek
- Time zone: UTC+4 (AZT)
  - Summer (DST): UTC+5 (AZT)

Yukhary Leninabad is a village in the Babek District of the Nakhchivan Autonomous Republic of Azerbaijan.
