= Kalbaoruc Dizə =

- Municipality
- Location within Azerbaijan
- Coordinates: 39°17′40″N 45°28′16″E
- Country: Azerbaijan
- Autonomous republic: Nakhchivan
- District: Babek

Population (2005)
  - Total: 501
- Time zone: UTC+4 (AZT)

Kalbaoruc Dizə (until 2003, Oruc Dizə, Oruj Diza, and Orudzhdiza) is a village and municipality in the Babek District of Nakhchivan, Azerbaijan. It is located 16 km in the north-east from the district center, on the foothill area. Its population is busy with grain-growing, poultry and animal husbandry. There is a medical center in the village. It has a population of 501.

== Etymology ==
Its previous name was Kalbaoruc Dizə (Kalbaoruj Diza). The name was made up from the components of Kalbaoruj (Karbalayi Oruj has been the name of person which was distorted during the pronunciation) and diza (the old term of Iranian origin, means as "village", "castle", "fortified") means "a village belonging to Karbalayi Oruj". Later the word of Kalba (Karbalayi) was dropped from the name. Since 2003, the name of the village again was officially registered as Kalbaoruc Dizə.
