= Hacıvar =

- Municipality
- Location within Azerbaijan
- Coordinates: 39°12′21″N 45°26′33″E
- Country: Azerbaijan
- Autonomous republic: Nakhchivan
- District: Babek

Population (2005)
  - Total: 721
- Time zone: UTC+4 (AZT)

Hacıvar (also, Hajivar and Hajyvar) is a village and municipality in the Babek District of Nakhchivan, Azerbaijan. It is located in the near of the Nakhchivan-Sirab highway, 6 km in the north-east from the district center, on the foothill area. Its population is busy with grain growing, vine-growing and animal husbandry. There is a secondary school, club and a mosque in the village.

== Etymology ==
Hajıvar - is located on the bank of the Nakhchivan River, on the plain. The name was made up with components of Haji (person name) and Iranian origin word of var (place, village) and means "Haji's village".

== Population ==
Hacıvar has a population of 721.
