= Nakhchivan (city) =

City in Azerbaijan

Nakhchivan Naxçıvan
- City
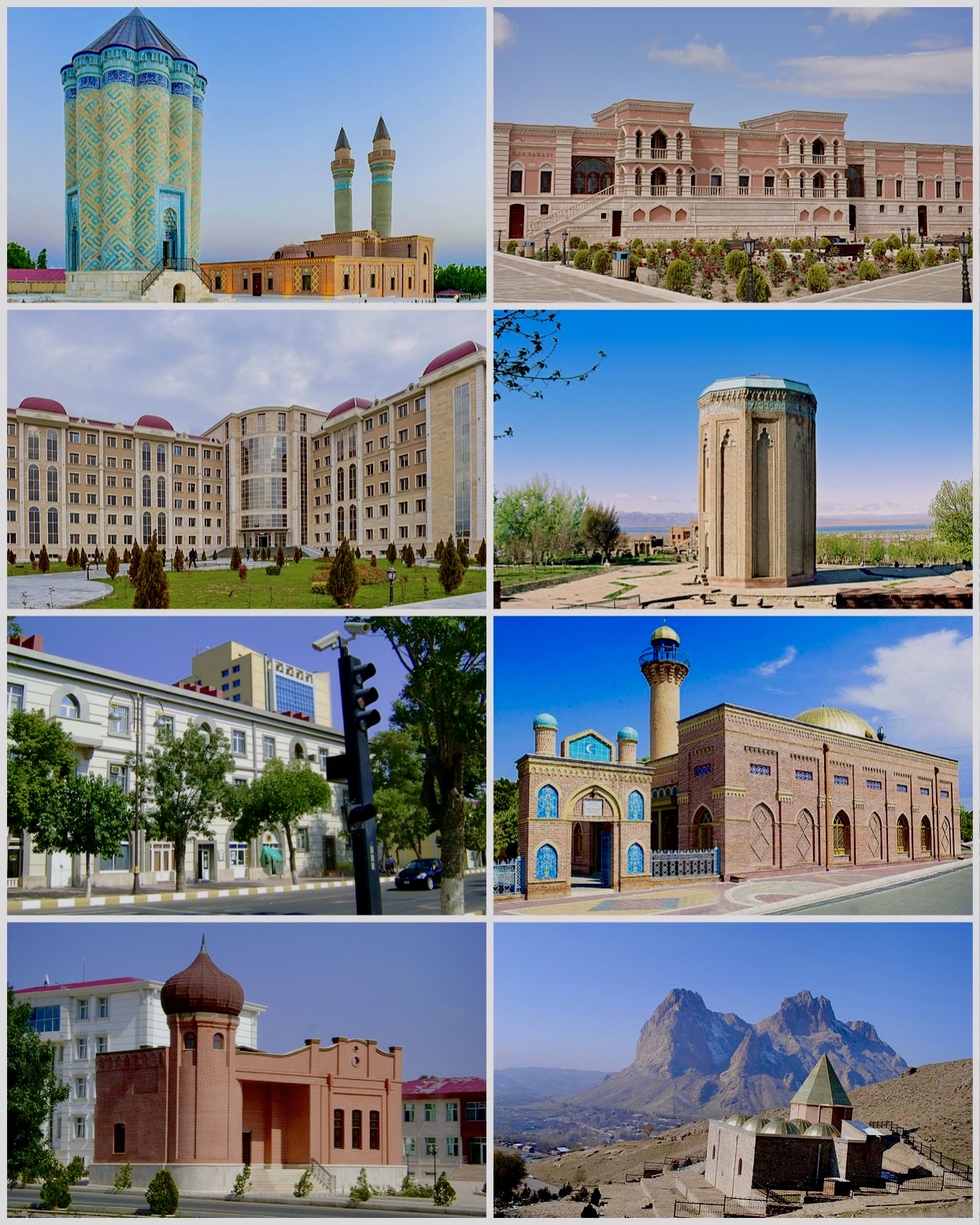
- Landmarks of Nakhchivan, from top left: Garabaghlar Mausoleum • Khan Palace; Nakhcivan Hospital • Momine Khatun; City Centre • Juma Mosque; Feminine Centre • Khanegah tomb

- Coordinates: 39°12′58″N 45°24′38″E
- Country: Azerbaijan
- Autonomous Republic: Nakhchivan

Area
  - Total: 190 km^{2} (73 sq mi)
- Elevation: 873 m (2,864 ft)

Population (2020)
  - Total: 94,500
- Demonym: Nakhchivanly
- Time zone: UTC+4 (AZT)
- Website: ih.nakhchivan.az

Nakhchivan (Azerbaijani: Naxçıvan Azerbaijani pronunciation: [nɑxtʃɯˈvɑn]; Armenian: Նախիջևան, romanized: Naxijevan Armenian pronunciation: [naχidʒevˈan]) is the capital and largest city of the eponymous Nakhchivan Autonomous Republic, a true exclave of Azerbaijan, located 450 km (280 mi) west of Baku. The municipality of Nakhchivan consists of the city of Nakhchivan, the settlement of Əliabad and the villages of Başbaşı, Bulqan, Haciniyyət, Qaraçuq, Qaraxanbəyli, Tumbul, Qarağalıq, and Daşduz. It is spread over the foothills of Zangezur Mountains, on the right bank of the Nakhchivan River at an altitude of 873 m (2,864 ft) above sea level.

== Toponymy ==
The city's official Azerbaijani spelling is "Nakhchivan" (Azerbaijani: Naxçıvan). The name is transliterated from Persian as Nakhjavan (Persian: نخجوان). The city's name is transliterated from Russian as Nakhichevan' (Russian: Нахичевань) and from Armenian as Nakhijevan (Armenian: Նախիջևան, romanized: Naxijevan).

The city is mentioned in Ptolemy's Geography (2nd century AD) as Naxouána (Ancient Greek: Ναξουάνα). The older form of the name is Nakhchavan (Armenian: Նախճաւան). According to philologist Heinrich Hübschmann, the name was originally borne by the city and later given to the surrounding region. Hübschmann believed the name to be composed of Nakhich or Nakhuch (probably a personal name) and avan, an Armenian word (ultimately of Iranian origin) meaning "place, town".

In the Armenian tradition, the name of the city is connected with the Biblical narrative of Noah's Ark and interpreted as meaning "place of the first descent" or "first resting place" (as if deriving from նախ, nakh, 'first' and իջեւան, ijevan, 'abode, resting place') due to it being regarded as the site where Noah descended and settled after the landing of the Ark on nearby Mount Ararat. It was probably under the influence of this tradition that the name changed in Armenian from the older Nakhchavan to Nakhijevan. Although this is a folk etymology, Nakhchivan is referred to as Apobatērion ("place of descent") by the first-century Jewish historian Flavius Josephus in connection with Noah's Ark, which would make the tradition connecting the name with the Biblical figure Noah very old, predating Armenia's conversion to Christianity in the early fourth century.

Early Islamic sources knew the city as Nashawā; but starting from the Buyid and Seljuk periods, forms like Nakhjavān, Nakhchevān, and Naqchevan were used.

== History ==
=== Classical period ===
According to the Armenian historian Movses Khorenatsi, King Tigranes I of Armenia settled Median prisoners of war at Nakhchivan in the second century BC. Nakhchivan is first mentioned in Ptolemy's Geographia as Naxuana (Greek: Ναξουὰνα).

Nakhchivan was destroyed by Shahanshah Shapur II in 363 and its Armenian and Jewish population was deported to Iran. Emperor Heraclius travelled through the city en route to Atropatene in 623 during the Byzantine–Sasanian War of 602–628.

=== Medieval period ===
The Arab siege of Nakhchivan in 650 AD led Theodore Rshtuni to conclude a truce. After the rebellion of 703 AD Muhammad ibn Marwan had the rebel nobles burnt alive in churches in Nakhchivan and Goghtn in 705. Nakhchivan temporarily came under the control of the Bagratid Kingdom of Armenia in c. 900, but was swiftly taken by Muhammad ibn Abi'l-Saj. The city was the temporary refuge of Atabeg Nusrat al-Din Abu Bakr after his defeat at the Battle of Shamkor in 1195, and Nakhchivan was conquered by the Kingdom of Georgia in 1197.

The city and its surroundings were ruled either directly or indirectly by Zakarid Armenia from 1201 to 1350, but more often than not they only had partial independence and often were vassals of other empires. In 1225, Nakhchivan was occupied by al-Maleka al-Jalāliya, daughter of Atabeg Muhammad Jahan Pahlavan. In 1236 Nakhchivan was occupied by the Mongol Empire and later the Ilkhanate forcing Zakarid Armenia to pay taxes to the Mongol lords as well as owing them loyalty and troops. Genoese merchants were known to trade in the city by 1280. The city was conquered by Timur in 1401, but was taken by King George VII of Georgia in 1405.

=== Modern period ===
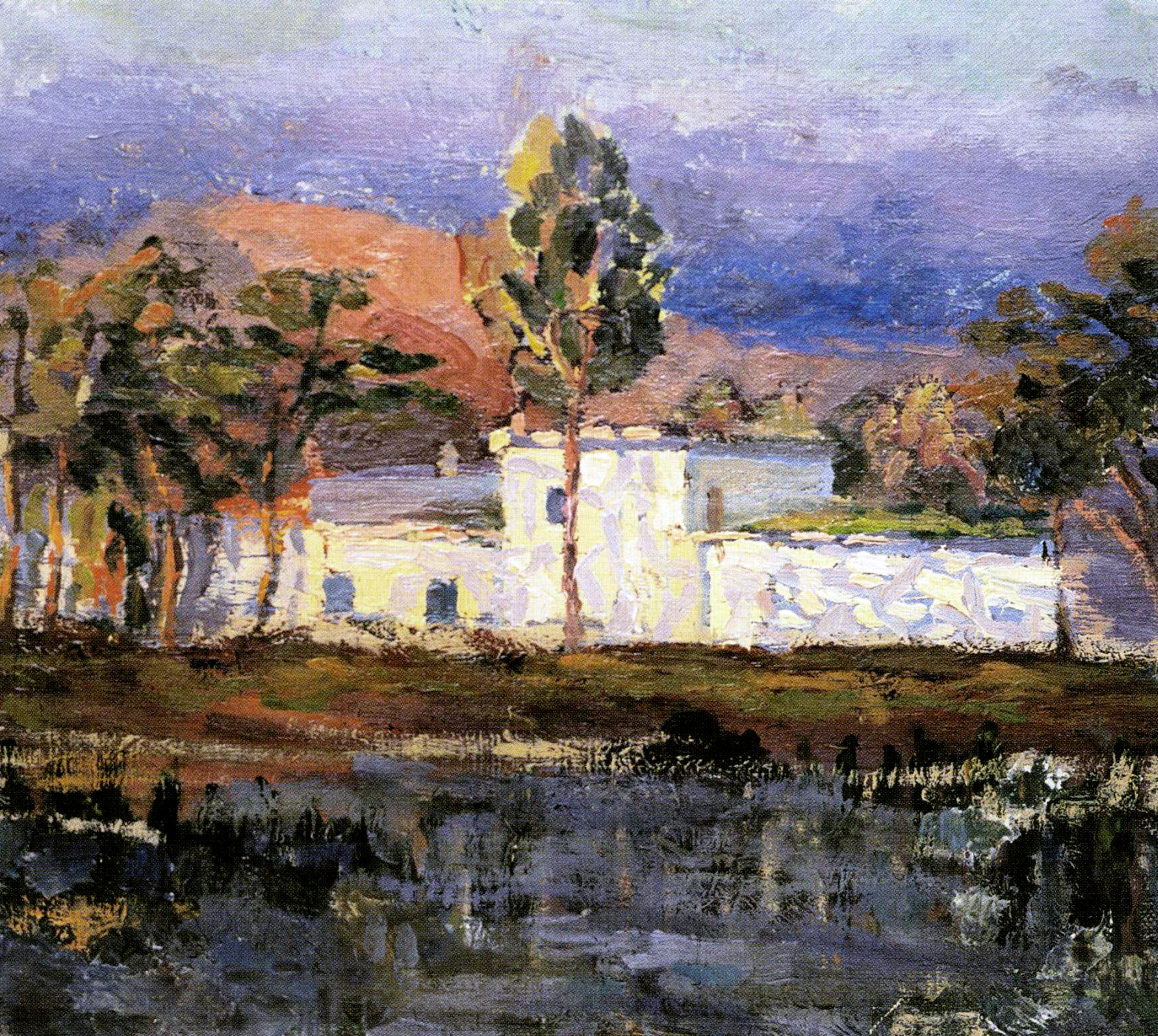
Bahruz Kangarli: Landscape with a house

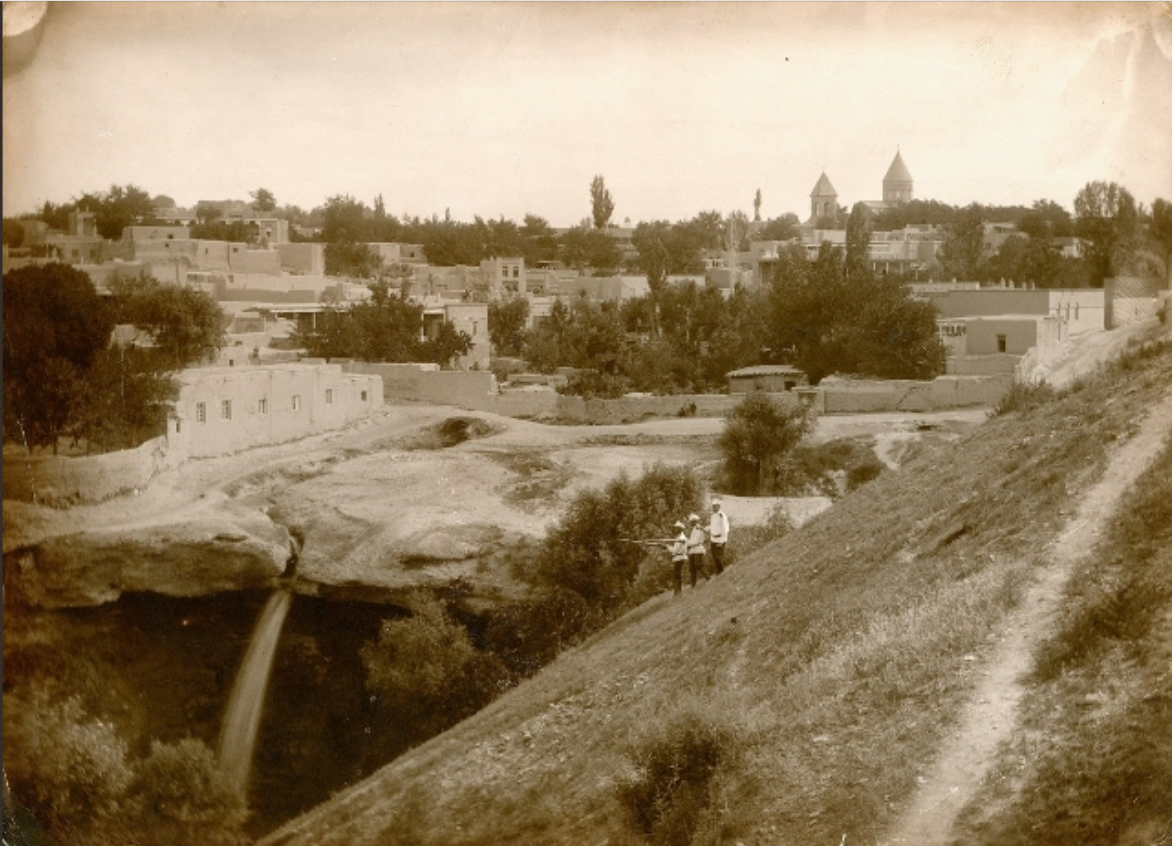
View of the Armenian quarter of the city, 1910s

Nakhchivan was conquered by Shahanshah Ismail I in 1503. Shahanshah Abbas I of Persia reconquered Nakhchivan from the Ottoman Empire in 1603–1604. Later the city served as the capital of the Nakhichevan Khanate.

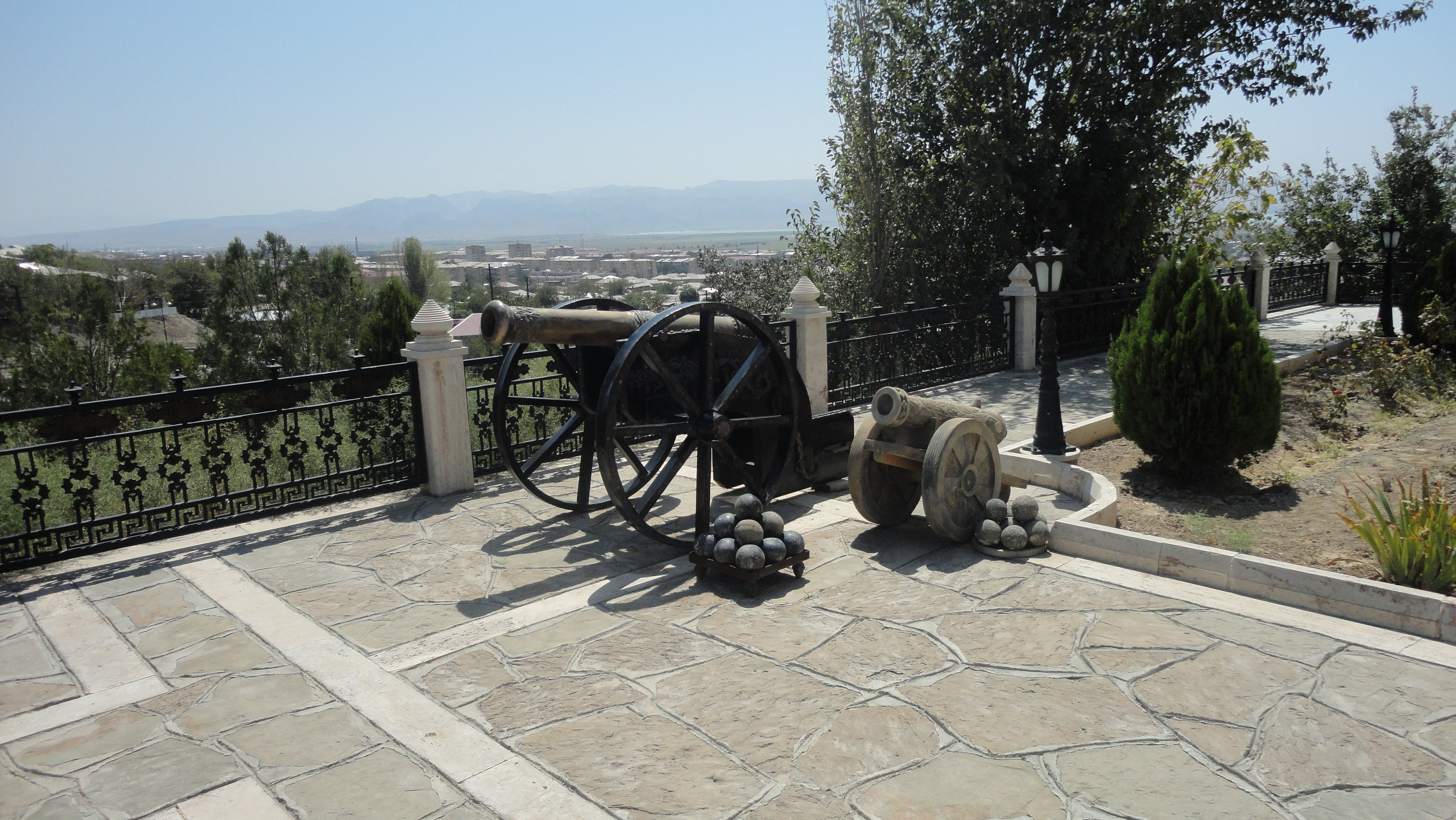
Khan Palace yard

Nakhchivan Khanate was annexed to the Russian Empire per the Treaty of Turkmenchay in 1828. The city became the centre of the Nakhichevan uezd of the Erivan Governorate in 1849. In 1896, Nakhchivan had a population of 7,433, roughly two-thirds of which were Azeri-speaking Muslims and one-third Armenian Christians. According to the 1897 census, Nakhchivan had the status of a county town (Russian: у. г. / уездный город, romanized: u. g. / uyezdny gorod).

Nakhchivan City coat of arms under Imperial Russia (designed in 1843)

After the February Revolution of 1917, a soviet was formed in Nakhchivan, but the city was under the control of the Special Transcaucasian Committee from March to November 1917, and its successor the Transcaucasian Commissariat from November 1917 to March 1918. Turkey occupied Nakhchivan from June until November, after which the city was occupied by British soldiers in January 1919, and a military governor was appointed to administer Nakhchivan.

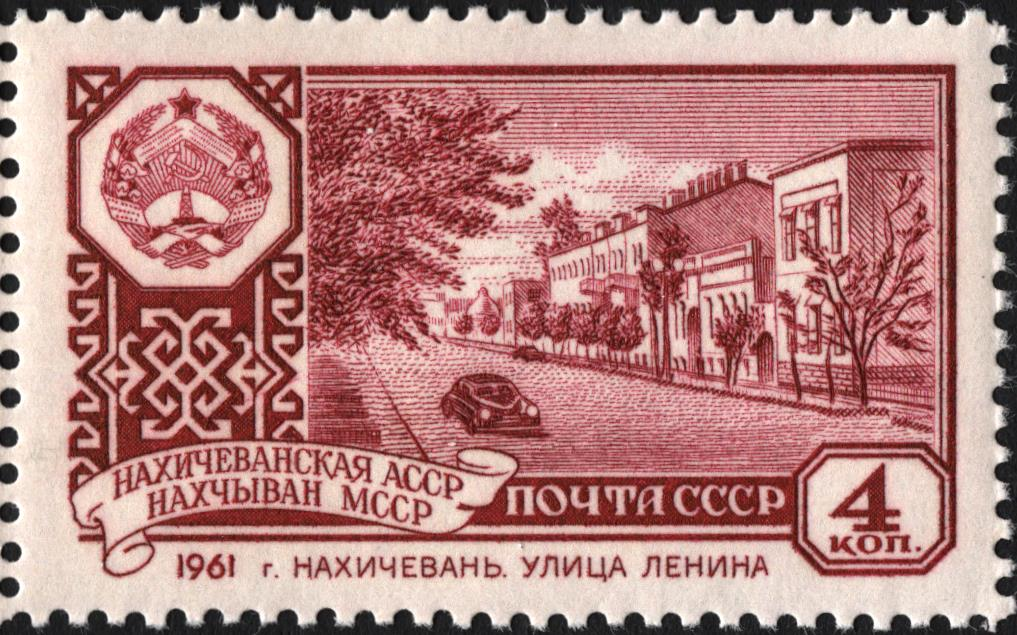
Nakhchivan on a 1961 stamp

It was decided that Nakhchivan would be granted to Armenia on 6 April 1919, and the city was annexed on 6 June 1919, however, some months later the city became the center of a regional Muslim uprising and pogrom against its Armenian inhabitants. Britain, France, Italy, and the US, with approval from Armenia and Azerbaijan, agreed on 25 October 1919 to appoint American Colonel Edmond D. Daily as General-Governor of Nakhchivan, elections would be held, and both Armenia and Azerbaijan would withdraw its forces from the territory. However, in March 1920, Turkish forces led by Kâzım Karabekir occupied Nakhchivan.

Soviet Russia took control of Nakhchivan on 28 July 1920, and the city became part of the newly formed Nakhchivan Autonomous Soviet Socialist Republic. The Treaty of Moscow of 16 March 1921, and later the Treaty of Kars of 21 October 1921, between Soviet Union and Turkey agreed that Nakhicheva would be an autonomous territory under the protection of Azerbaijan and delimited its borders with Turkey. In February 1923, the city formed part of the Nakhchivan Autonomous Krai within the Azerbaijan Soviet Socialist Republic (ASSR), but later became the capital of the Nakhchivan Autonomous Soviet Socialist Republic within the ASSR in March 1924.

When Azerbaijan declared independence from the Soviet Union, Nakhchivan remained part of the Republic of Azerbaijan. Following the 2020 Nagorno-Karabakh war, a trilateral ceasefire was signed between Armenia, Azerbaijan and Russia. According to the agreement, Azerbaijan will gain a road access to Nakhchivan through Armenia which will be secured by Russian peacekeepers.

Since 9 June 2009, the Bulqan, Qaraçuq, Qaraxanbəyli, Tumbul and Haciniyyət villages of the Babek District are included in the scope of the administrative-territorial unit of the Nakhchivan city.

=== Ecclesiastical history ===
The bishop of Mardpetakan resided at Nakhchivan, and the Armenian historian Tovma Artsruni records Sahak Vahevuni as bishop of Nakhchivan and Mardpetakan and brother of Apusahak Vahevuni.

== Geography ==
The city is spread over the foothills of Zangezur chain, on the right bank of the Nakhchivan River at an altitude of almost 1,000 metres (3,300 feet). The floods and soil erosion spiked because of the decreased forest cover along riverbanks. As a result, reforestation projects implemented in the city to encourage tree planting.

=== Climate ===
Nakhchivan has a continental semi-arid climate (Köppen BSk) with short but cold, snowy winters and long, dry, very hot summers.

Climate data for Nakhchivan (1991–2020 normals)
Month	Jan	Feb	Mar	Apr	May	Jun	Jul	Aug	Sep	Oct	Nov	Dec	Year
Mean daily maximum °C (°F)	3.5 (38.3)	6.1 (43.0)	13.4 (56.1)	20.4 (68.7)	25.6 (78.1)	31.0 (87.8)	34.7 (94.5)	34.7 (94.5)	29.8 (85.6)	22.3 (72.1)	12.8 (55.0)	5.2 (41.4)	20.0 (67.9)
Daily mean °C (°F)	−0.9 (30.4)	0.9 (33.6)	6.8 (44.2)	13.5 (56.3)	18.2 (64.8)	22.9 (73.2)	26.5 (79.7)	26.6 (79.9)	21.8 (71.2)	15.0 (59.0)	7.2 (45.0)	1.0 (33.8)	13.3 (55.9)
Mean daily minimum °C (°F)	−5.3 (22.5)	−4.4 (24.1)	0.2 (32.4)	6.6 (43.9)	10.7 (51.3)	14.8 (58.6)	18.3 (64.9)	18.4 (65.1)	13.7 (56.7)	7.7 (45.9)	1.5 (34.7)	−3.2 (26.2)	6.6 (43.9)
Average precipitation mm (inches)	19 (0.7)	18 (0.7)	29 (1.1)	38 (1.5)	36 (1.4)	30 (1.2)	17 (0.7)	8 (0.3)	11 (0.4)	26 (1.0)	20 (0.8)	15 (0.6)	267 (10.5)
Average precipitation days	5	4	6	7	9	5	2	2	2	5	4	4	55
Mean monthly sunshine hours	82.9	117.3	188.3	202.6	254.5	324.0	364.4	338.7	302.5	215.6	148.1	121.1	2,660
Mean daily sunshine hours	2.7	4.2	6.1	6.8	8.2	10.8	11.8	10.9	10.1	7	4.9	3.9	7.3
Source 1: NOAA (precipitation 1971–1990) Meteostat
Source 2: Deutscher Wetterdienst (Daily sunshine 1971–1990)

== Population ==
Nakhchivan is believed to have been populated by Armenians from ancient times. The 5th-century Armenian history Buzandaran Patmuiwnkʻ reports that the Armenian king Tigranes the Great (r. 95–55 BC) resettled Jews from Palestine to Nakhchivan, and that in the 4th century AD the Sasanian king Shapur II (r. 309––379) resettled 2,000 Armenian and 16,000 Jewish families from Nakhchivan to Iran. These numbers, though exaggerated, attest to Nakhchivan's status as a populous city at the time. According to Nina Garsoïan, the population of Nakhchivan appears to have remained predominantly Armenian in the early medieval period, as the Arab geographer Ibn Hawqal records Armenian as the language of the city in the tenth century; although Vladimir Minorsky and Clifford Edmund Bosworth write that the town "acquired a Muslim character" after the massacre of the Armenian nobles there in 705.

In the thirteenth century, the town's inhabitants were massacred by the Mongols, and William of Rubruck described it as "almost a wilderness" in 1253. It must have recovered quickly, as in 1339–1340 Hamdallah Mustawfi considered it "an attractive, flourishing place". According to Veronika Tsibenko, the Armenian population of Nakhchivan declined rapidly in the Seljuk period and especially after Timur's (r. 1370–1405) destructive conquest. In about 1500, the Kangarlu, a Turkic nomadic tribe of four to five thousand people, settled in Persian Armenia. The city suffered during the Ottoman-Safavid wars of the late sixteenth and early seventeenth centuries; it was in ruins when visited by the travelers Jean-Baptiste Tavernier (in 1664) and Jean Chardin (in 1673). Most of the Armenian population died or was forcibly resettled during this period. The Safavid shah Abbas the Great (r. 1587–1629) deported 250,000 to 300,000 Armenians, as well as Muslims, from the Nakhchivan region deep into Persia in 1604. Later, under Shah Abbas II (r. 1642–1666), the Kangarlu returned to Nakhchivan.

Armenians returned to Nakhchivan under the terms of the Treaty of Turkmenchay of 1828, by which the city and the region came under Russian rule. At that time, per Russian estimates, there were 114 Armenian families, 392 Muslim families, and 285 Armenian immigrant families living in the city. By the end of the nineteenth century, Armenians made up about one-third of the population while Muslims made up two-thirds. The Nakhchivan region was a site of interethnic conflict between Armenians and Azerbaijanis from 1918 to 1920. As result, the proportion of the Armenian population decreased to 11–15 percent in 1926. By 1979, Armenians made up only 1.4 percent of the city's population. The remaining Armenian population of Nakhchivan departed as a result of the Nagorno-Karabakh conflict and the forcible population exchange between Armenia and Azerbaijan.

Nakhchivan experienced significant emigration in the 1990s and 2000s to Turkey and the main part of Azerbaijan. According to the State Statistics Committee of Azerbaijan, the number of population of city was 63,800 in 2000. Per the latest Azerbaijani census in 2019, the population of Nakhchivan is 94,368, consisting of an urban population of 83,792 and a population of 10,576 in the rural settlements administered together with the city.

Ethnic composition of Nakhchivan
Nationality	1829–1832 census		1897 census		1916 almanac		1926 census		1939 census	
Nationality	Number	%	Number	%	Number	%	Number	%	Number	%
Azerbaijanis (Note: Mentioned as "Tatars" in the 1897 census, mentioned as "Shia Muslims" in the 1916 almanac, and as "Turks" or "Turko-Tatars" in the 1926 census. In the 1939 census, they are referred to as "Azerbaijanis".)	2,624	47.97	6,161	70.09	6,026	67.45	7,567	73.49	11,901	75.83
Armenians	2,825	51.65	2,263	25.75	2,665	29.83	1,065	10.34	2,033	12.95
Russians	0	0.00	216	2.46	147	1.65	1,376	13.36	1,420	9.05
Kurds	0	0.00	2	0.02	0	0.00	6	0.06	32	0.20
Georgians	17	0.31	24	0.27	72	0.81	24	0.23	19	0.12
Others	4	0.07	124	1.41	24	0.27	258	2.51	289	1.84
TOTAL	5,470	100.00	8,790	100.00	8,934	100.00	10,296	100.00	15,694	100.00

The population of Nakhchivan (at the beginning of the year, thsd. persons)
Population	2000	2001	2002	2003	2004	2005	2006	2007	2008	2009	2010	2011	2012	2013	2014	2015	2016	2017	2018	2019
Nakhchivan town	63,8	64,2	64,7	65,1	70,7	71,0	71,3	71,7	72,7	82,4	83,4	84,7	86,4	88,0	89,5	90,3	91,1	92,1	92,9	93,7
Urban population	63,8	64,2	64,7	65,1	70,7	71,0	71,3	71,7	72,7	73,7	73,8	75,4	76,8	78,3	79,5	80,2	80,9	81,8	82,6	83,2
Rural population	–	–	–	–	–	–	–	–	–	8,7	9,6	9,3	9,6	9,7	10,0	10,1	10,2	10,3	10,3	10,5

== Economy ==
Traditionally, Nakhchivan was home to trade industry, handicraft, shoemaking and hatmaking by Azerbaijanis. These industries have been largely replaced. The restoration enterprises and development industry, liberalization of foreign trade and the extension of the customs infrastructure, which has been largely responsible for Nakchivan's growth in the last two decades, are now major parts of Nakchivan's economy.

== Culture ==
The city has a wide range of cultural activities, amenities and museums. Heydar Aliyev Palace, which has a permanent local painting exhibition and a theatre hall for an audience of 1000 people, and a recently restored Soviet-time Opera Theatre where the Nakhchivan State Musical Drama Theatre realises theatre plays, concerts, musicals and opera.

Many of the city's cultural sites were celebrated in 2018 when Nakhchivan was designated an Islamic Culture Capital.

=== Architecture ===
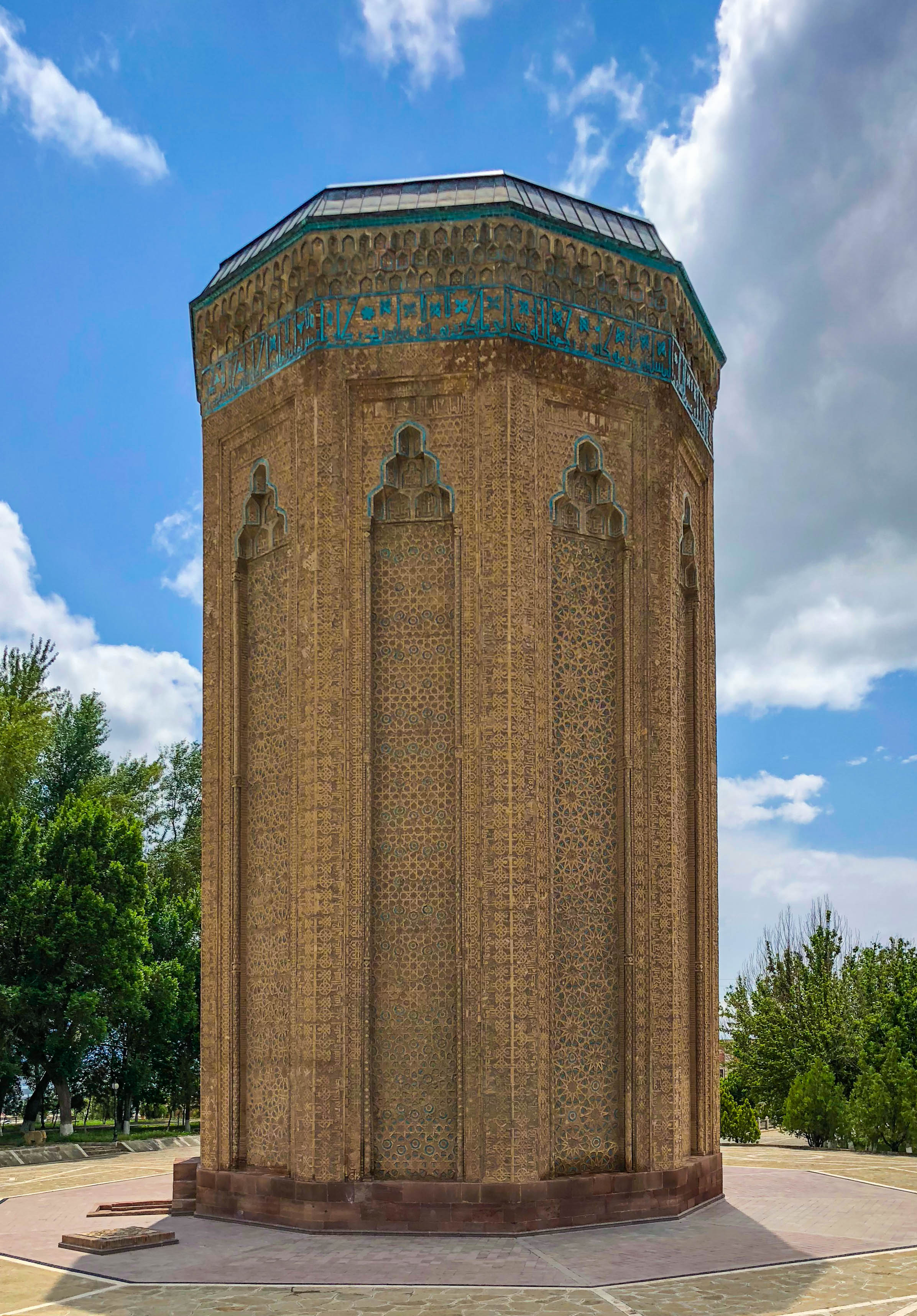
Momine Khatun Mausoleum is one of the most recognisable landmarks in Azerbaijan.

The city is home Momine Khatun Mausoleum, Gulustan Mausoleum, Noah's Mausoleum, Garabaghlar Mausoleum, Yusif ibn Kuseyir Mausoleum, Imamzadeh mausoleum and Mausoleum of Huseyn Javid mausoleums.

The main sight in the city is the heavily restored 12th-century Momine Khatun Mausoleum, also known as Atabek Gumbezi. Momine Khatun was the wife of Eldegizid Atabek Jahan Pahlivan, ruler of the Atabek Eldegiz emirate. The 10-sided monument is decorated with intricate geometrical motives and Kufic script, it uses turquoise glazed bricks. It shares the neighbourhood with a statue of its architect – Ajami Nakhchivani – and a bust of Heydar Aliyev. Also from the 12th century and by the same architect, is the octagonal Yusuf Ibn Kuseir tomb, known as Atababa, half abandoned near the main cemetery.

In 1993, the white marble mausoleum of Hussein Javid was built. The Azerbaijani writer died in the Gulag during Joseph Stalin's Great Purge. Both the mausoleum and his house museum are located east of the theatre. Although being a recent construction, Huseyn Javid's mausoleum is of great iconic importance, representing the ability of the exclave to live despite the Armenian embargo and becoming a symbol of Nakhchivan itself.

The mausoleums of Nakhchivan were entered for possible inclusion in the List of World Heritage Sites, UNESCO in 1998 by Gulnara Mehmandarova – president of Azerbaijan Committee of ICOMOS—International Council on Monuments and Sites.

=== Cuisine ===
Nakchivan’s signature cuisine includes shirin plov (sweet rice with gravy; made with mutton, hazelnuts, almonds and dried fruits), dastana, komba, tendir lavash and galin.

Lavash is made with flour, water, and salt. The thickness of the bread varies depending on how thin it was rolled out. Toasted sesame seeds and/or poppy seeds are sometimes sprinkled on before baking. It is impossible to imagine any table without bread in Azerbaijan and also in Nakhchivan. In connection with this, the assortment of bread in Nakhchivan is different; the tendir lavash as thin as paper, galin (thick), dastana, and komba (ash cake). If prepared to saj it was called lavash, "Juha salmag" – spread Juha, lavash bread on saj, and if prepared in the tandir, the "llavash yapmag" lavash bread stick. The fact is that it was necessary to stick lavash bread on the hot inner walls of the tandir. it is impossible to fight with lavash bread, as the proverb reads "Gyaldi lavash – Bitdili Savas" – "Came lavash – the end of the war". There are many people’s ideological expressions about lavash "Yavash-yavash -pendir- lavash " "Quietly (slow) – cheese lavash " or "Khamrali hash – bagryna bass", "Khamraliev" (kind of bread) push to the chest, i.e. . lavash bread – eat slowly. "Of lavash folk sandwiches are made in a roll shape – durmek. In the village where children ran out to play or school they were supplied with these sandwiches. Inside durmeks – rolls was put butter and jam, cheese, cottage cheese and butter, cheese with herbs, potatoes, boiled eggs, etc."

=== Sacrificial monument Ashabi-Kahf ===
Ashabi-Kahf is a sanctuary in a natural cave which is located in the eastern part of the city of Nakhchivan, between the mountains of Ilandag and Nahajir in Azerbaijan.Since ancient times Ashabi-Kahf is considered as a sacred place. It is known not only in Nakhchivan, but also in other regions of Azerbaijan and countries of the Middle East.Each year ten thousands of people make a pilgrimage to this place.

=== Museums and galleries ===
The city also has many historical museums, the literature museum of Nakhchivan Autonomous Republic, Nakhchivan State History Museum, The Nakhchivan State Carpet Museum, and the house museums of Jamshid Nakhchivanski and Bahruz Kangarli. There is also an archaeological museum found on Istiqlal street. The city has a few interesting mosques, particularly the Juma mosque, with its large dome.

Modern museums in Nakchivan include the Museum under Open Air, Heydar Aliyev Museum and the Memorial Museum (Xatıra Muzeyi), dedicated to the national strife between Armenia and Azerbaijan.

=== Music and media ===
The regional channels Nakhchivan TV and now-defunct Kanal 35, and newspaper Sharg Gapisi are headquartered in the city.

=== Sports ===
Araz Naxçivan one of the top futsal clubs in the European futsal arena and regularly participates in UEFA Futsal Cup.

Nakhchivan has one professional football team, Araz-Naxçıvan, which currently competes in the top-flight of Azerbaijani football, the Azerbaijan Premier League.

In 2014, the city hosted Masters Weightlifting World Cup.

=== Festivals ===
Nakhchivan is known for its "Goyja" fruit, sort of a cherry-plum, and hosts a traditional Goyja festival at the Nakhchivangala Historical-Architectural Museum Complex. Products made from goyja—jam, compote (drink), pickles, dried, lavasha (bread) – are shown at the festival.

Another festival organized annually in Nakhchivan is associated with kata (Azerbaijani: kətə) – flat pie with greens, which is made with shomu (wild spinach), mixed greens, desert candle, pumpkin, asphodel, nettle, bean or lentil in a dough wrapped in the shape of an envelope and cooked in a tandir. Kata festival is aimed to show and promote the preparation manner of various types of the kata specific to different regions of NAR. The festival is held at the Historical-Architectural Museum Complex "Nakhchivangala" in April.

== Education ==
There are 3 professional, 6 musical, 22 secondary schools and a military cadet school in Nakhchivan administered by the city council.

=== Universities and colleges ===
Nakhchivan is home to numerous universities:

- Nakhchivan State University
- Nakhchivan Private University
- Nakhchivan Teachers Institute

== Transport ==
=== Public transport ===
Nakhchivan's trolleybus system consisted of three lines at its height and existed until 2004.

=== Air ===
Nakhchivan International Airport

Nakhchivan International Airport is the only commercial airport serving Nakhchivan. The airport is connected by bus to the city center. There are domestic flights to Baku and international service to Russia and Turkey.

=== Rail ===
Currently, a light rail line operates from Nakhchivan southeast to Ordubad and northwest to Sharur.

There is also Julfa railroad which is connected to Iran.

The Nakhchivan-Yeraskh railroad is a Soviet-era railway linking Armenia and Azerbaijan, closed since the 1990s.

Turkey is constructing a new 224-kilometer railway from its Kars province to the Dilucu border, connecting to Azerbaijan's Nakhchivan exclave, a crucial part of the proposed Zangezur Corridor, aiming to create a direct rail link for trade between Azerbaijan and Turkey.

=== Road ===
The M7 (European route E002) is a 89 km (55 mi) long highway in Nakhchivan. The route runs northwest from the city of Nakhchivan to the border with Turkey in the northwestern end of the exclave.

== Notable residents ==
The city's notable residents include: president of Azerbaijan Heydar Aliyev; Huseyn Javid, poet and playwright, founder of progressive romanticism in Azerbaijani literature; writer Jalil Mammadguluzadeh; opera singer Azer Zeynalov; film director Rza Tahmasib; generals Huseyn Khan Nakhchivanski and Jamshid Nakhchivanski; artist Bahruz Kangarli; architect Ajami Nakhchivani; and the Armenian actress Hasmik.

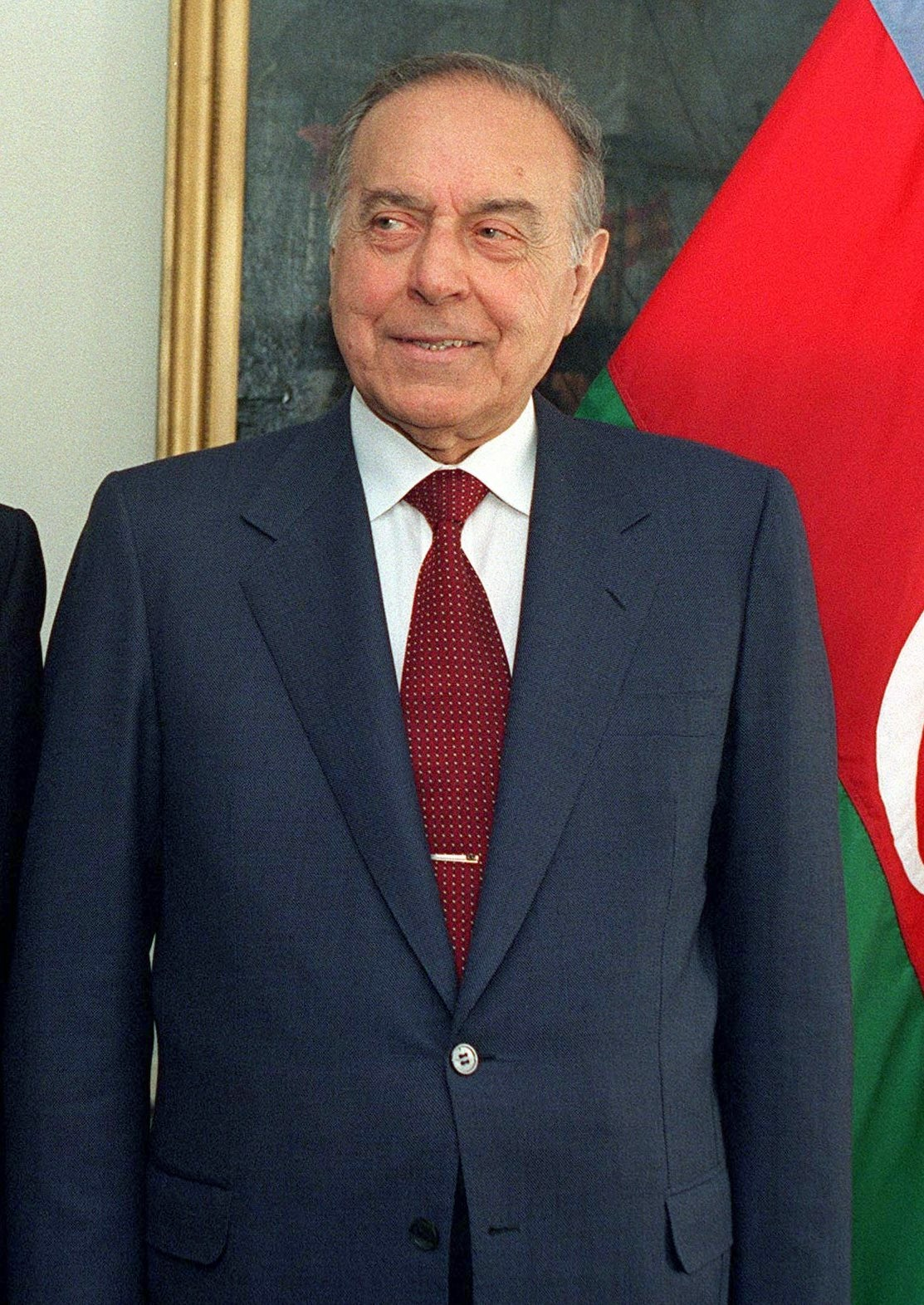
Heydar Aliyev, the longest serving political leader of Azerbaijan.

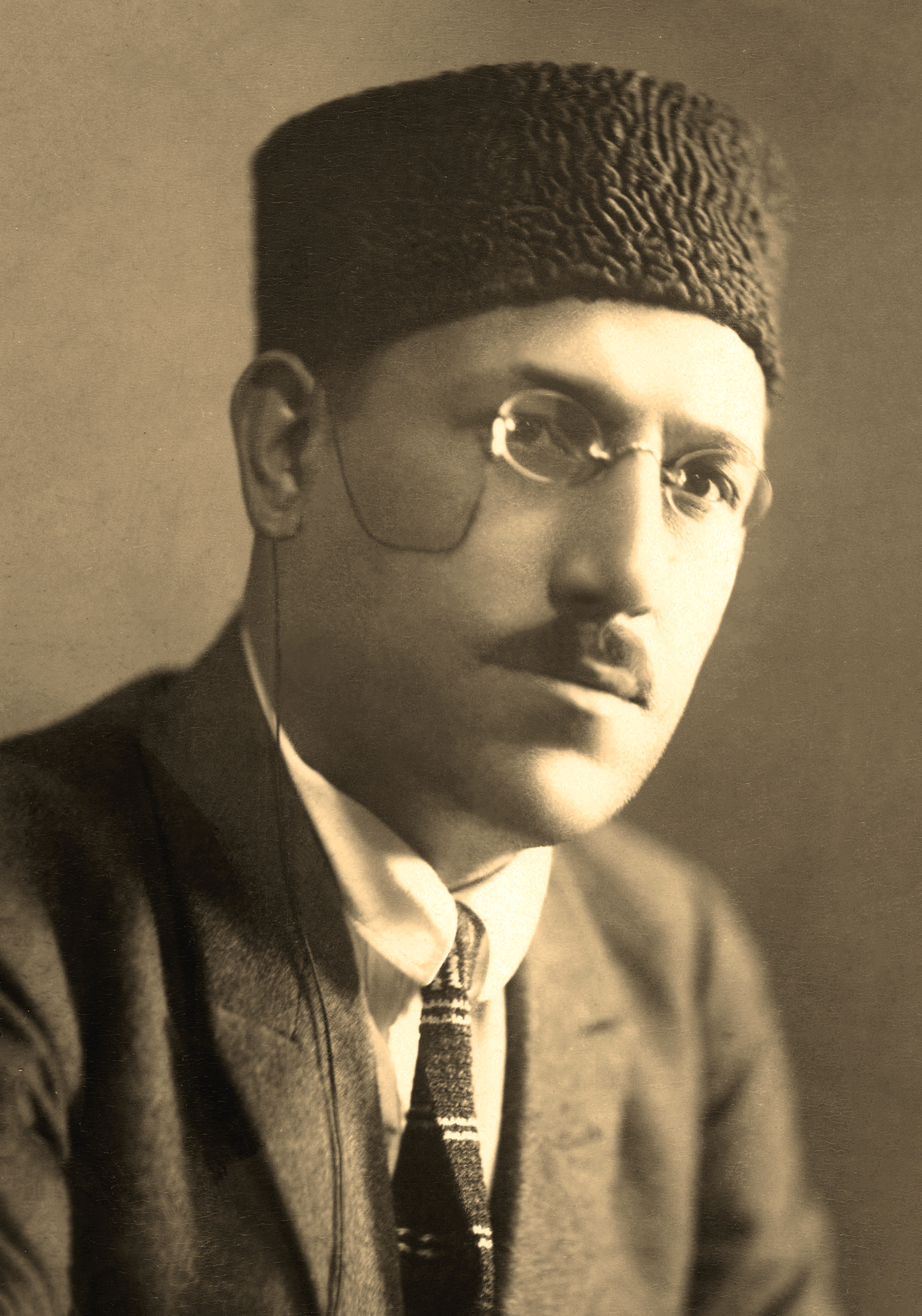
Huseyn Javid, the founder of progressive romanticism in Azerbaijani literature.

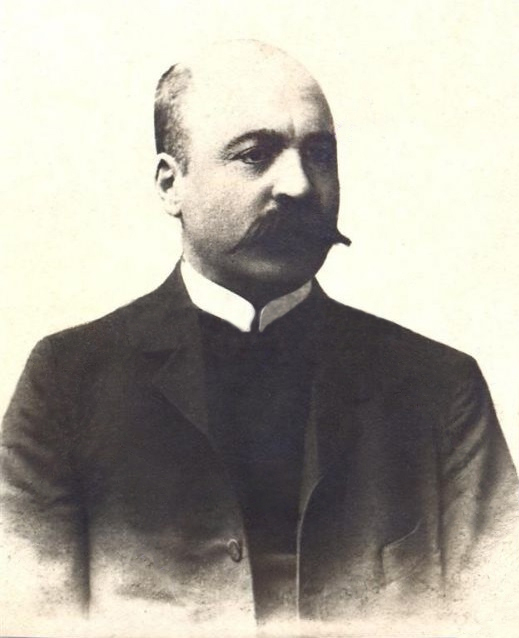
Jalil Mammadguluzadeh, Azerbaijani satirist and writer.

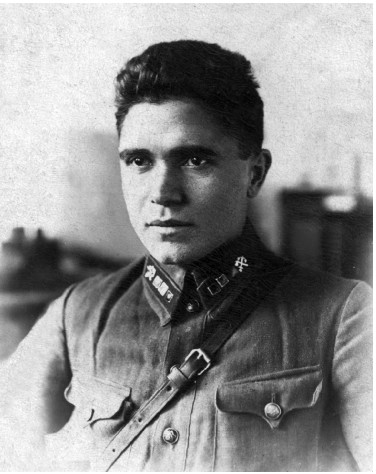
Abdurrahman Fatalibeyli, major of the Soviet army who defected to the German side during World War II.

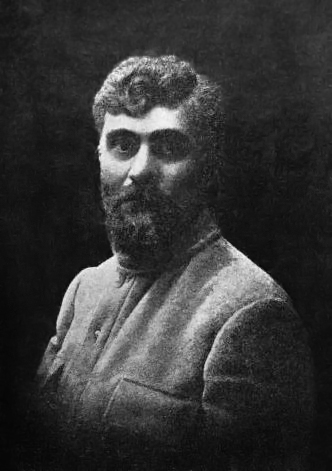
Khetcho, Armenian activist, combatant and key participant in the Iranian Constitutional Revolution

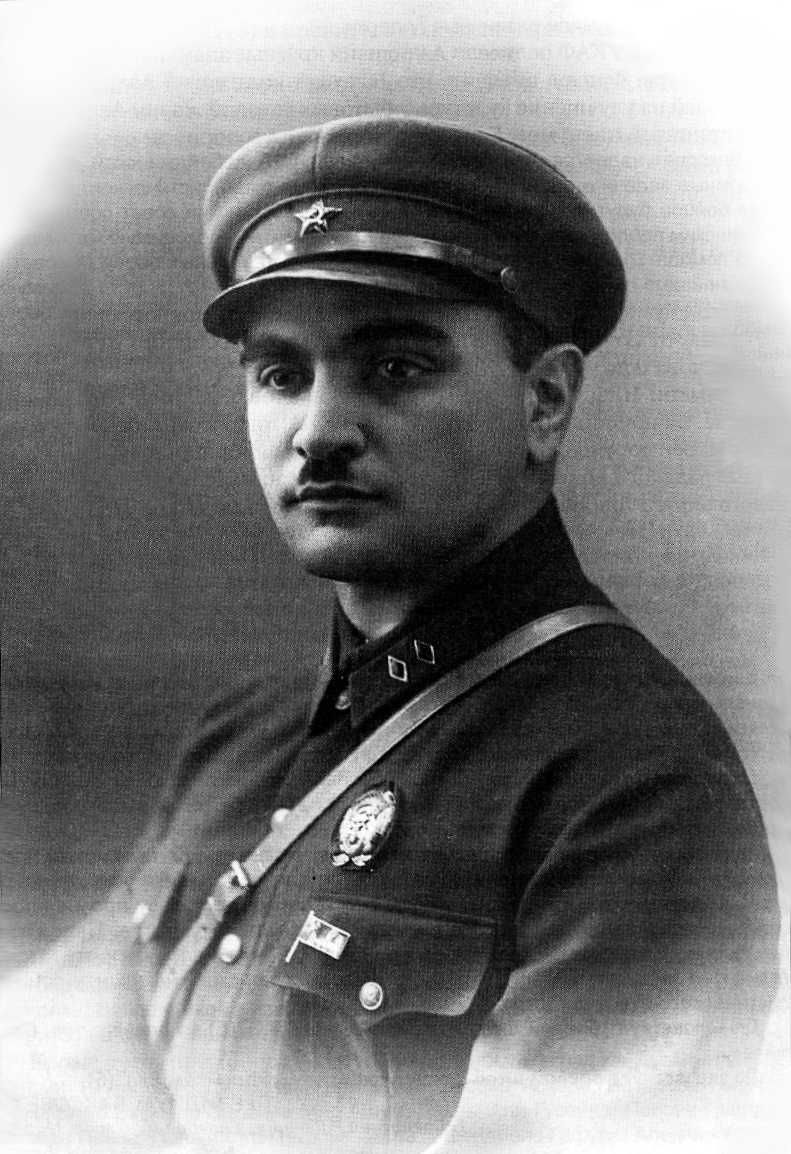
Jamshid Nakhchivanski, Russian Imperial, Azerbaijani and Soviet military commander.

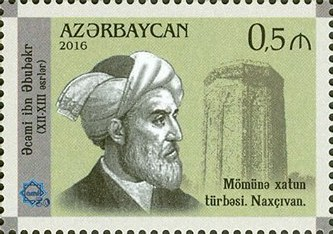
Memar Ajami, the founder of the Nakhchivan school of architecture

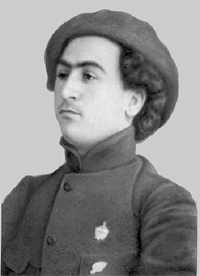
Bahruz Kangarli, the founder of realistic easel painting in Azerbaijan.

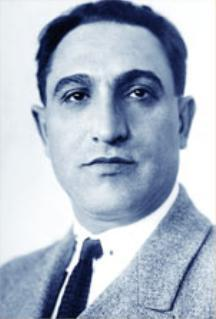
Rza Tahmasib, film director and actor.

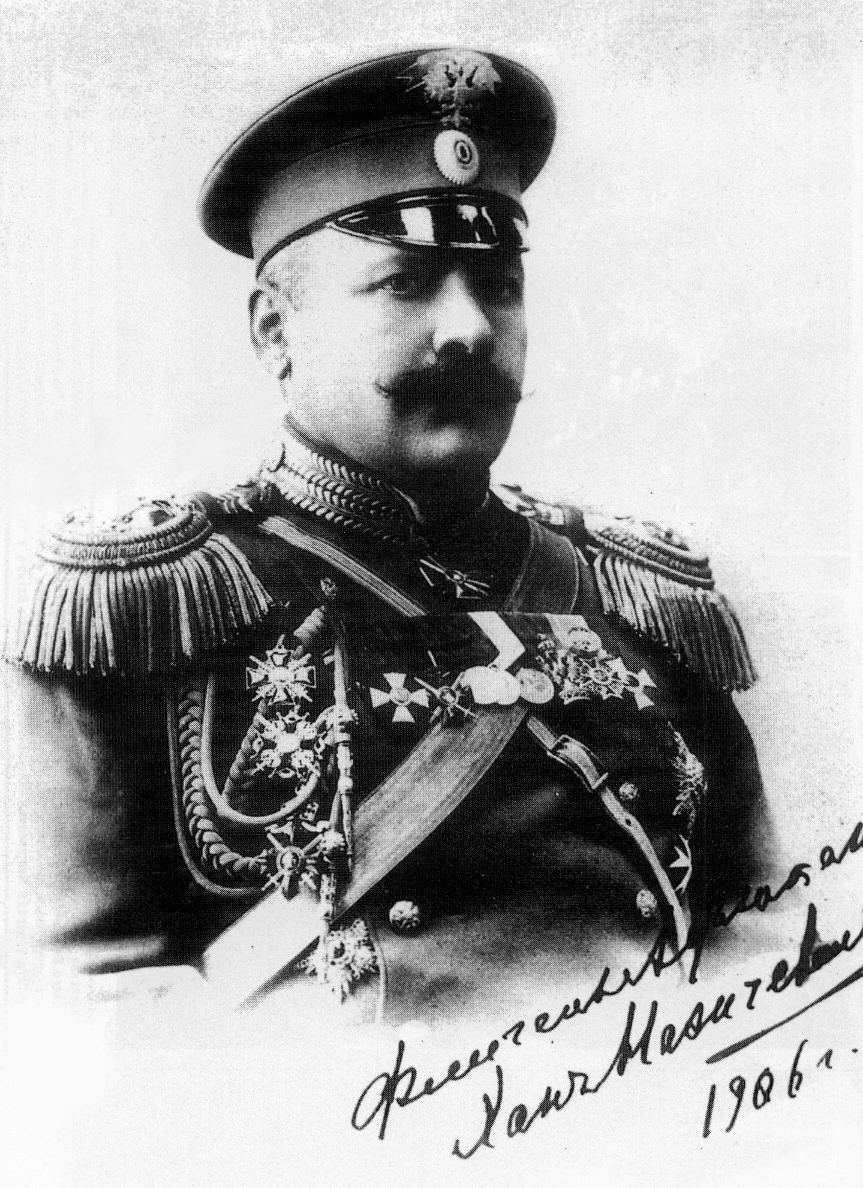
Huseyn Khan Nakhchivanski, the only Muslim to serve as General-Adjutant of the Russian Emperor.

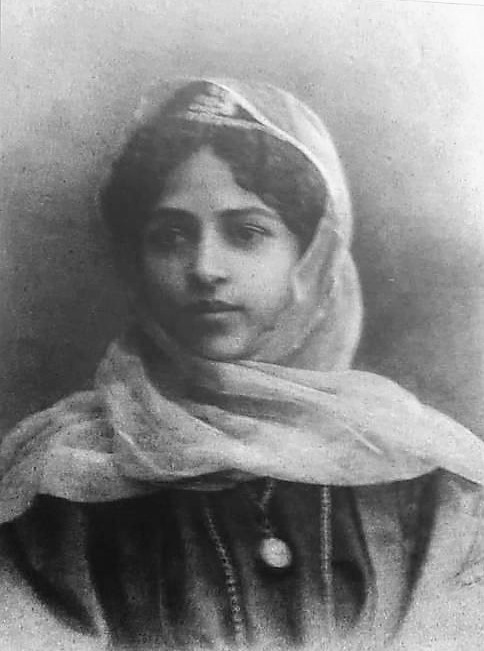
Nazli Najafova, pioneering educator of women and girls.

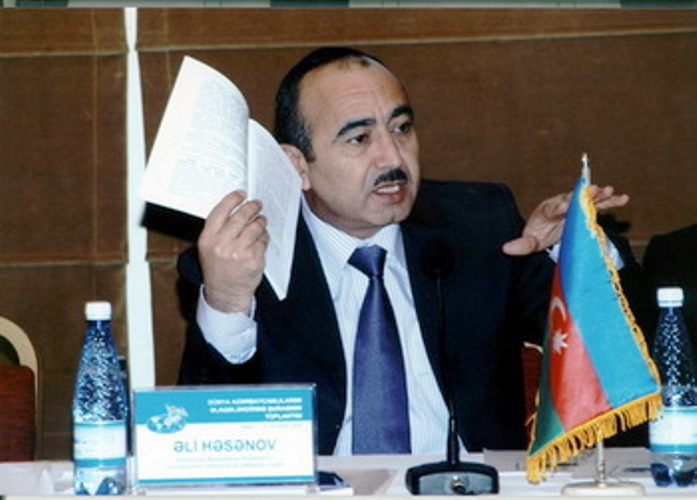
Ali M. Hasanov, former National Adviser to the President of Azerbaijan.

== International relations ==
=== Twin towns ===
Nakhchivan is twinned with various cities.

- (Georgia (country)) Batumi, Georgia, (since 2012)
- Brest, Belarus
- Tarnovo, Bulgaria
- Ürümqi, China (since 2025)

== Gallery ==
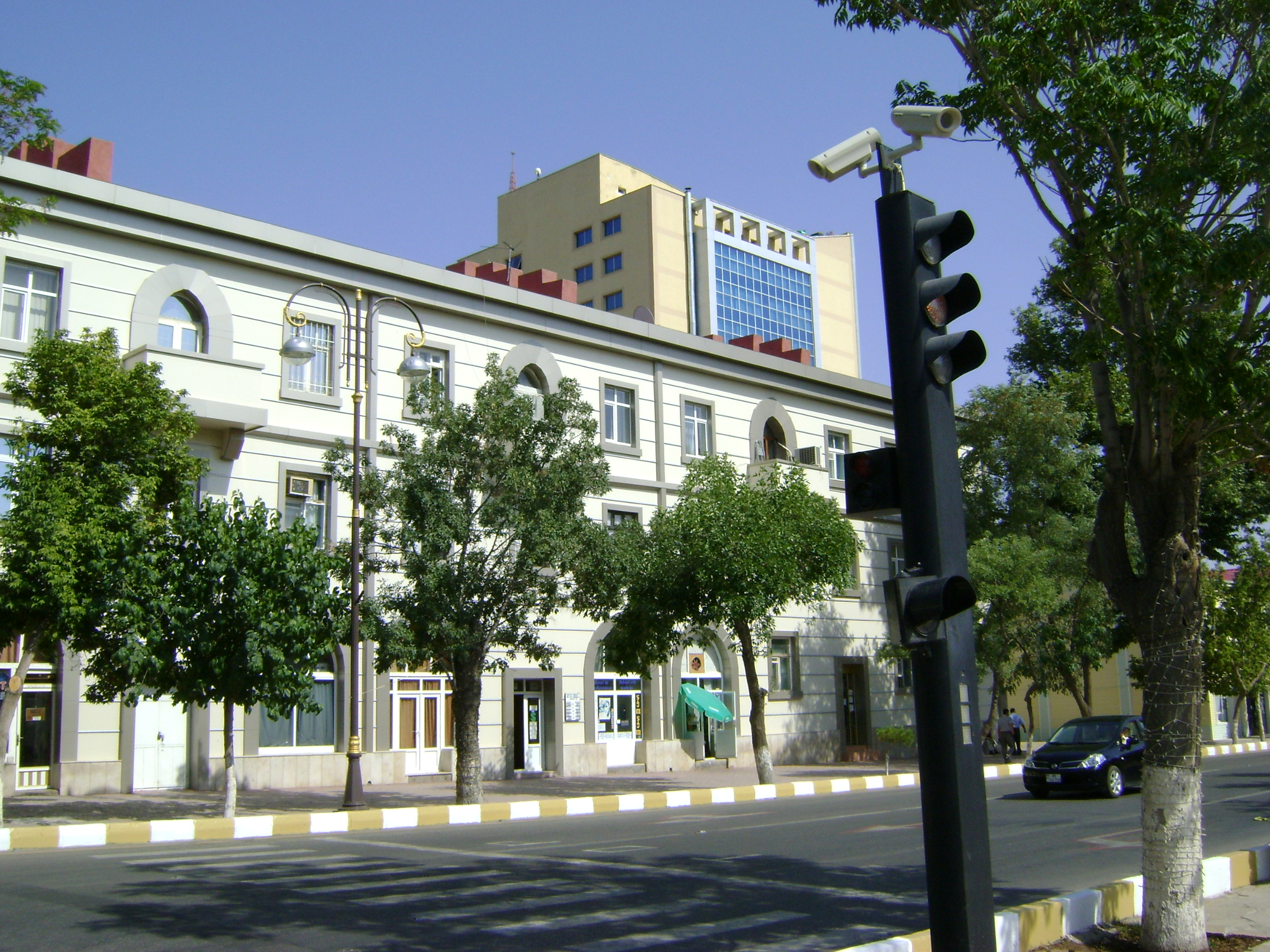
Nakhchivan city

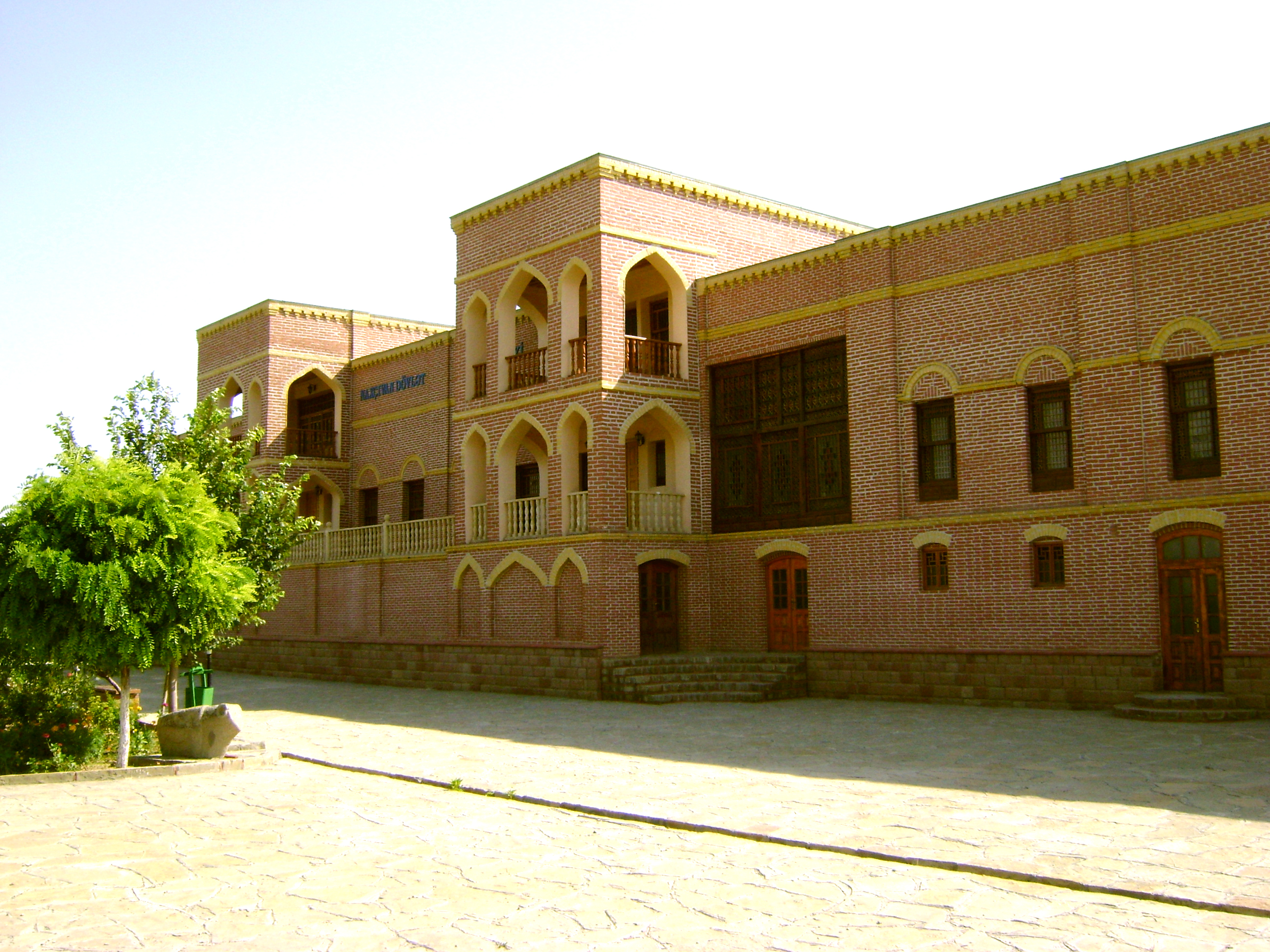
Palace of Nakhchivan Khans

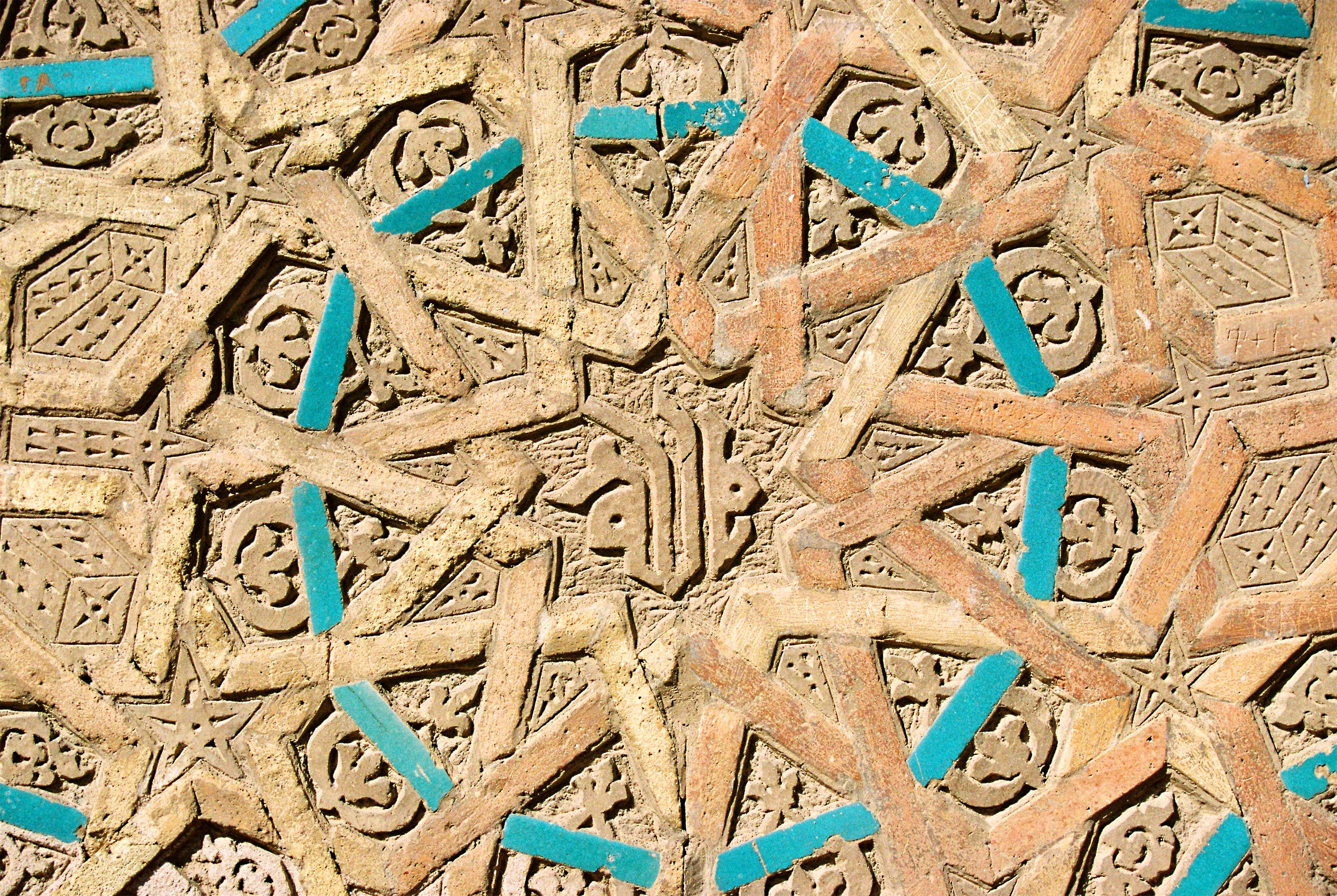
Face Pattern of the Momine Khatun Mausoleum

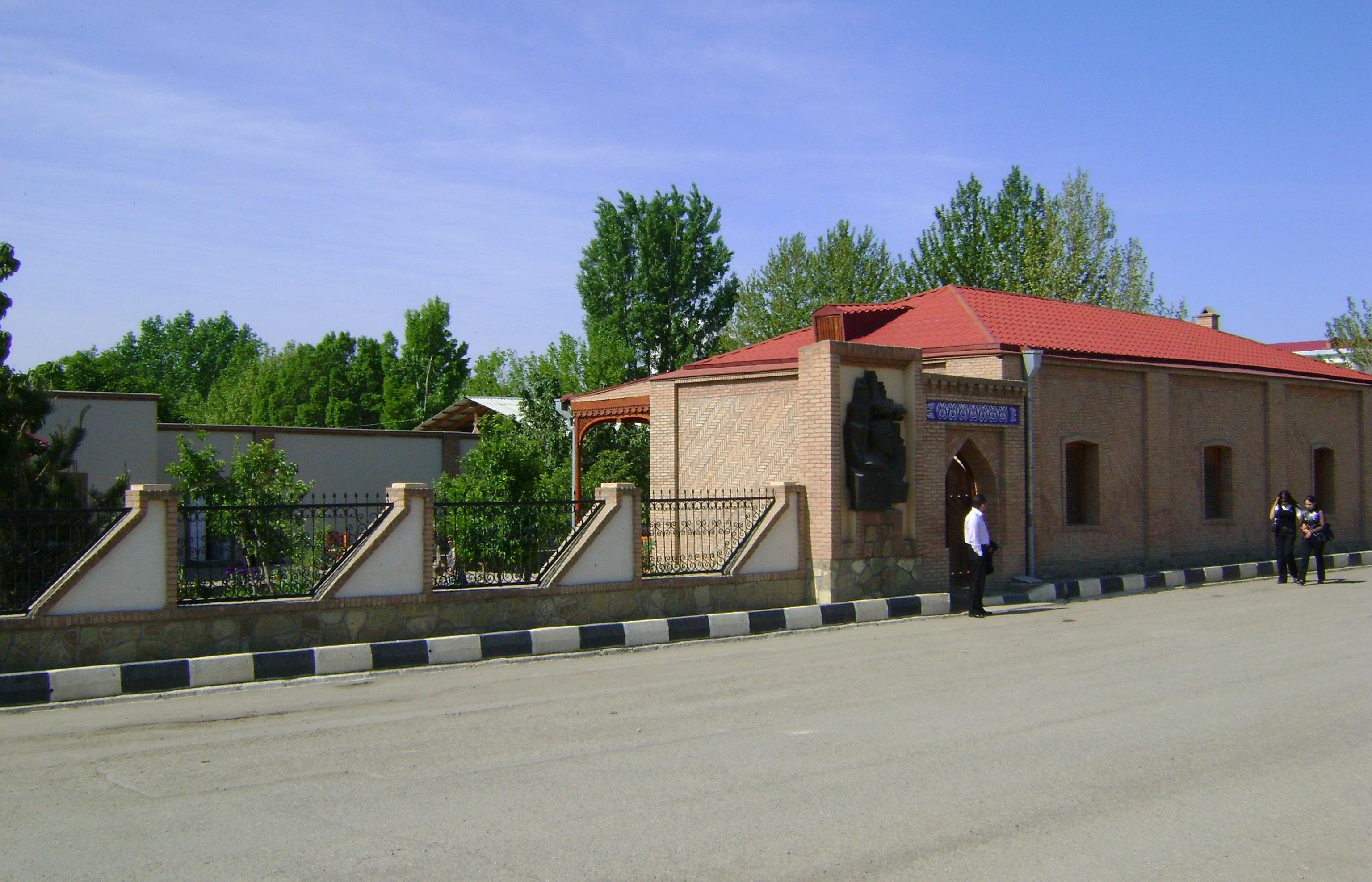
Huseyn Javid Home-Museum at Nakhchivan (general view)

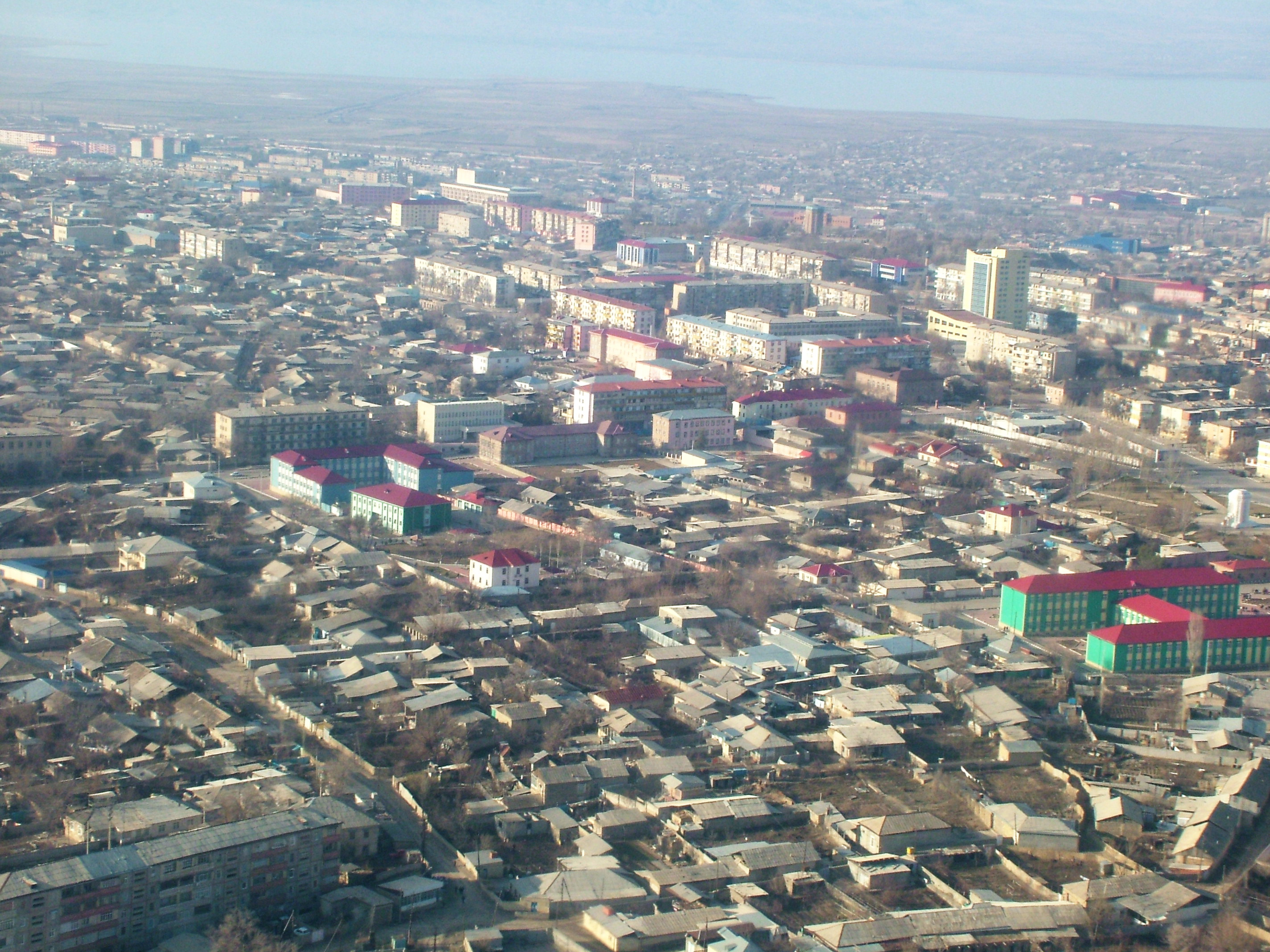
The aerial view of the city in 2006

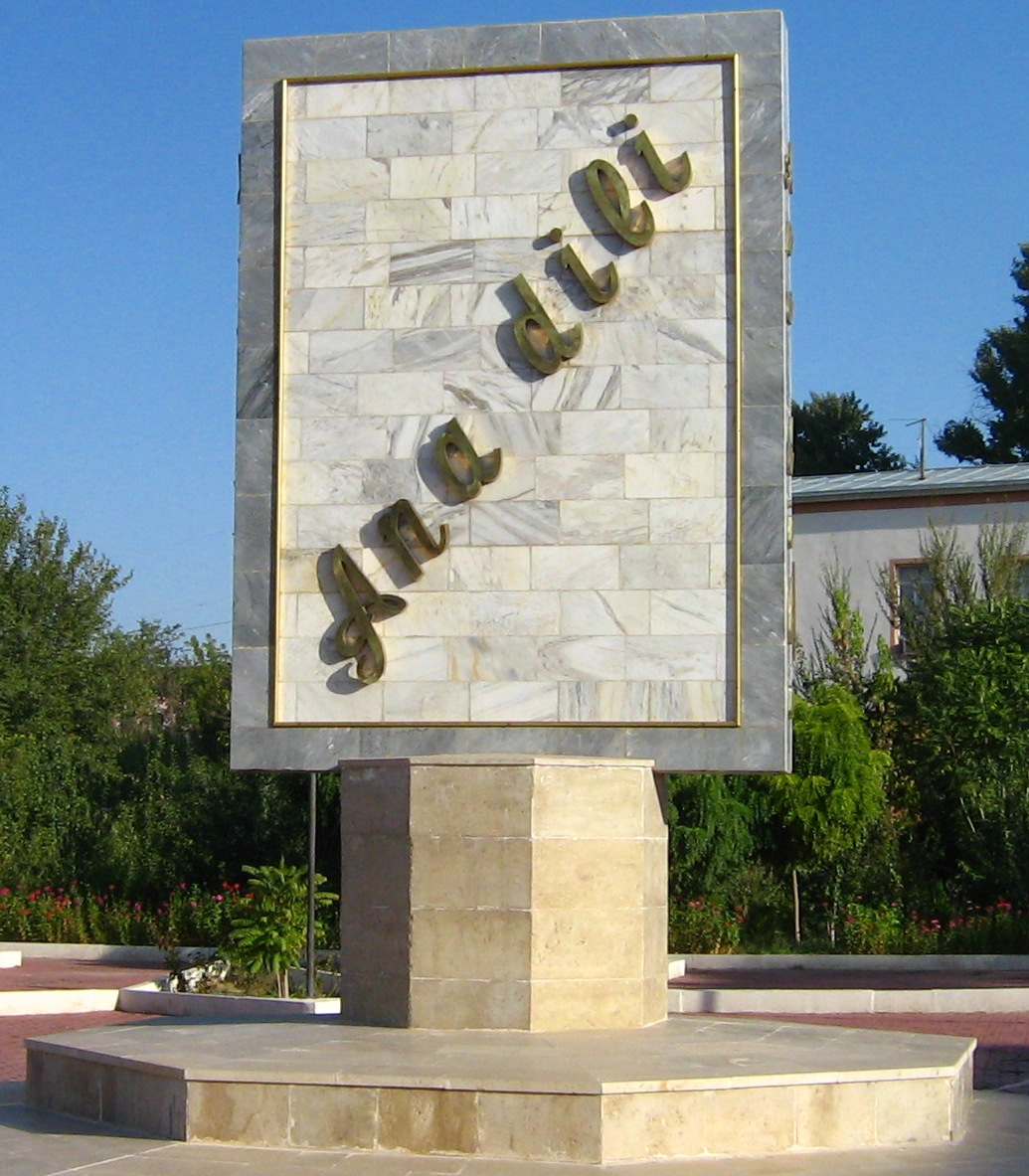
Monument for the Azerbaijani language

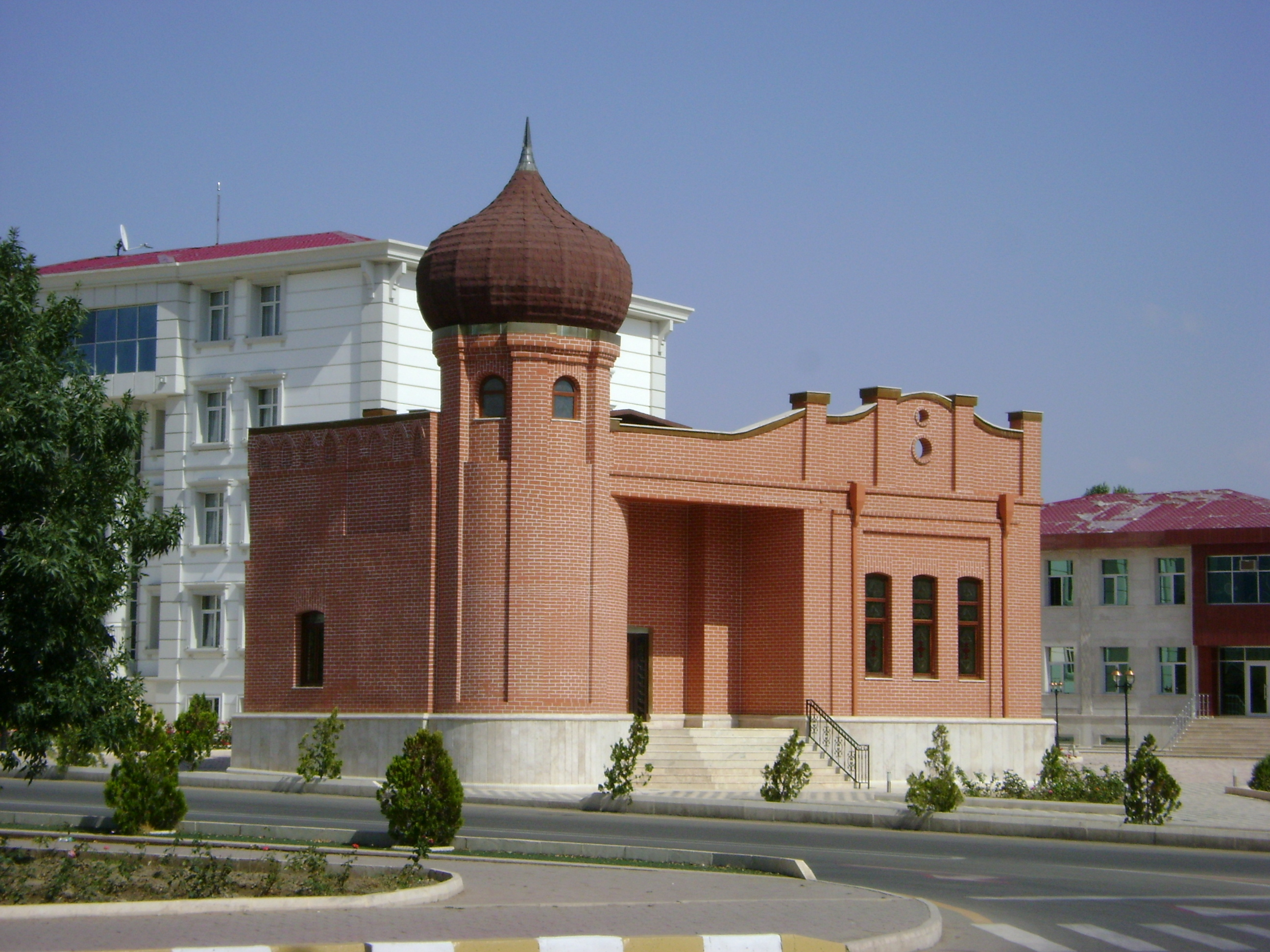
Old Mosque (17-18 Centuries)

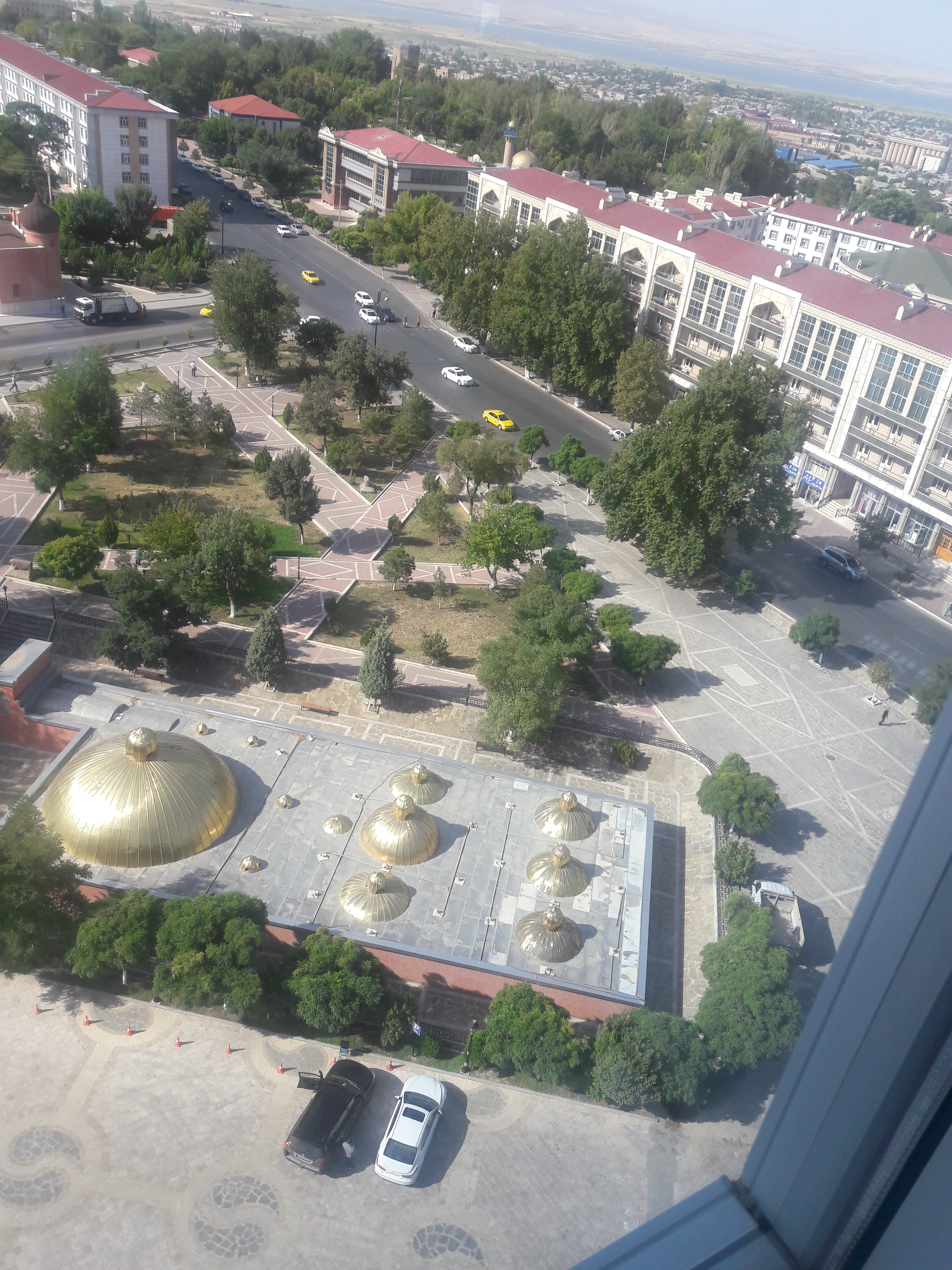
View from Tabriz Hotel

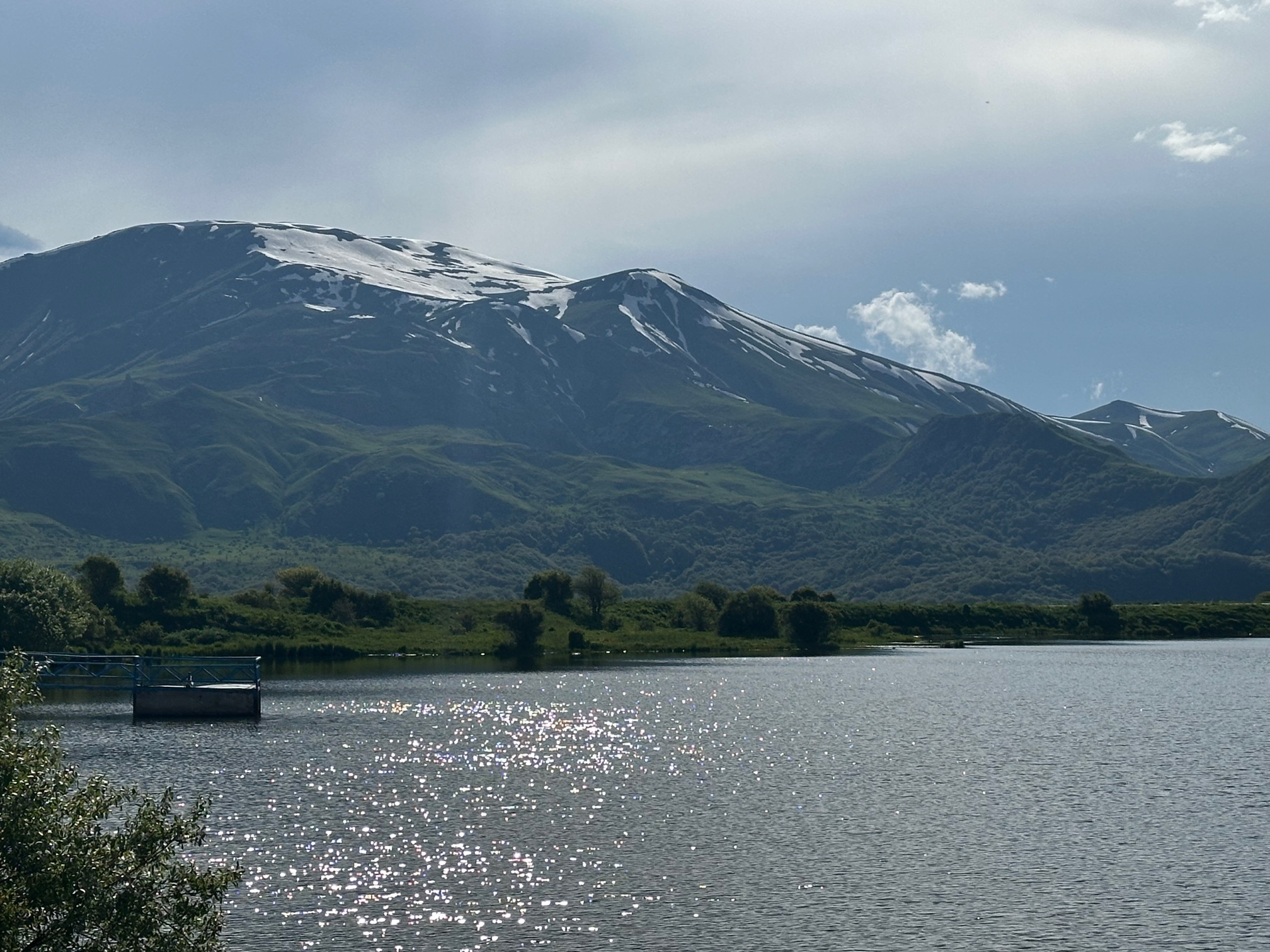
Lake of Batabat in the Noth of Nakhchivan.

== See also ==
- Nakhchivan Khanate - Turkic Khanate which ruled over the region in 18th century
- Thamanin in southeast Turkey
- Battle of Nakhicevan

== Bibliography ==
- Bernardini, Michele (2000). "Genoa". In Yarshater, Ehsan (ed.). Encyclopædia Iranica. Vol. X/4: Gāvbāzī–Geography IV (Online ed.). Encyclopædia Iranica Foundation. pp. 422–426.
- Blankinship, Khalid Yahya (1994). The End of the Jihad State: The Reign of Hisham Ibn 'Abd al-Malik and the Collapse of the Umayyads. Albany: State University of New York Press. ISBN 0791418278.
- Bosworth, C. Edmund (2013). "Naḵjavān". In Yarshater, Ehsan (ed.). Encyclopædia Iranica (Online ed.). Encyclopædia Iranica Foundation.
- Chaumont, M. L. (1986). "Armenia and Iran ii. The pre-Islamic period". In Yarshater, Ehsan (ed.). Encyclopædia Iranica. Encyclopaedia Iranica. Vol. II/4: Architecture IV–Armenia and Iran IV (Online ed.). Encyclopædia Iranica Foundation. pp. 418–438.
- Garsoïan, Nina G. (1987). "Naxčawan". In Strayer, Joseph R. (ed.). Dictionary of the Middle Ages. Vol. 9. New York: Scribner's. pp. 90–91. ISBN 0-684-18275-0.
- Hakobyan, T. Kh.; Melik-Bakhshyan, S. T.; Barseghyan, H. Kh. (1991). "Nakhijevan" Նախիջևան. Hayastani ev harakitsʻ shrjanneri teghanunneri baṛaran Հայաստանի և հարակից շրջանների տեղանունների բառարան [Dictionary of Toponymy of Armenia and Adjacent Territories] (in Armenian). Vol. 3. Yerevan University Publishing House. pp. 951–953.
- Hille, Charlotte Mathilde Louise (2010). State Building and Conflict Resolution in the Caucasus. Leiden: Brill. ISBN 9789004179011.
- Jamalova, Nigar (2024). "Armenia's plans on the Nakhchivan territory and the countermeasures of the Azerbaijan government (1918-1920)" (PDF). Azərbaycan Tarixşünaslığı / Azerbaijan Historiography (6): 25–49.
- Lint, Theo van (2018). "Nakhchivan". In Nicholson, Oliver (ed.). The Oxford Dictionary of Late Antiquity. Oxford University Press.
- Rayfield, Donald (2012). Edge of Empires: A History of Georgia. London: Reaktion Books. ISBN 9781780230306.
- Thomas, David; Mallett, Alexander; Roggema, Barbara (2010). Christian-Muslim Relations. A Bibliographical History. Volume 2 (900–1050). Brill.
- Tsibenko, Veronika (2021). Fleet, K.; Krämer, G.; Matringe, D.; Nawas, J.; Stewart, D. J. (eds.). "Nakhchivan". Encyclopaedia of Islam Three Online. Brill. doi:10.1163/1573-3912_ei3_COM_40258.
