= Cavidabad =

Cavadabad
- Location within Azerbaijan
- Coordinates: 39°11′16″N 45°22′33″E
- Country: Azerbaijan
- Autonomous republic: Nakhchivan
- District: Babek
- Time zone: UTC+4 (AZT)
  - Summer (DST): UTC+5 (AZT)

Cavidabad (also, Cavadabad, Dzhavidabad, and Dzhavudabad) is a village in the Babek District of the Nakhchivan Autonomous Republic of Azerbaijan.
