= Nehrəm mine =

Salt mine in Azerbaijan

- Location: Nehrəm, Babek District, Azerbaijan
- Products: Sodium chloride

The Nehrəm mine is a large salt mine located in south-western Azerbaijan in Babek District, close to Nehrəm. Nehrəm is one of the largest salt reserves in Azerbaijan and has estimated reserves of 2.5 billion tonnes of Sodium chloride (NaCl).
