= Gülşənabad =

- Municipality
- Location within Azerbaijan
- Coordinates: 39°22′18″N 45°23′47″E
- Country: Azerbaijan
- Autonomous republic: Nakhchivan
- District: Babek

Population (2005)
  - Total: 498
- Time zone: UTC+4 (AZT)

Gülşənabad (also, Gyul’shanabad and Shaytanabad) is a village and municipality in the Babek District of Nakhchivan, Azerbaijan. It is located 25 km in the south-east from the district center, on the bank of the Jahrichay River. Its population is busy with grain-growing and animal husbandry. There are primary school, library and mosque in the village. It has a population of 498.

== Etymology ==
Gülşənabad - is located on the bank of the Jahri River, on the foothill area. The former name of the settlement was Seytanabad and has been changed during the years of the Soviet rule. The name Gülşənabad (گلشن‌آباد, Golshanābād) is Persian and means "Garden village".
