= Asgar Asgarov =

Azerbaijani politician (born 1955)

- Əsgər Əsgərov
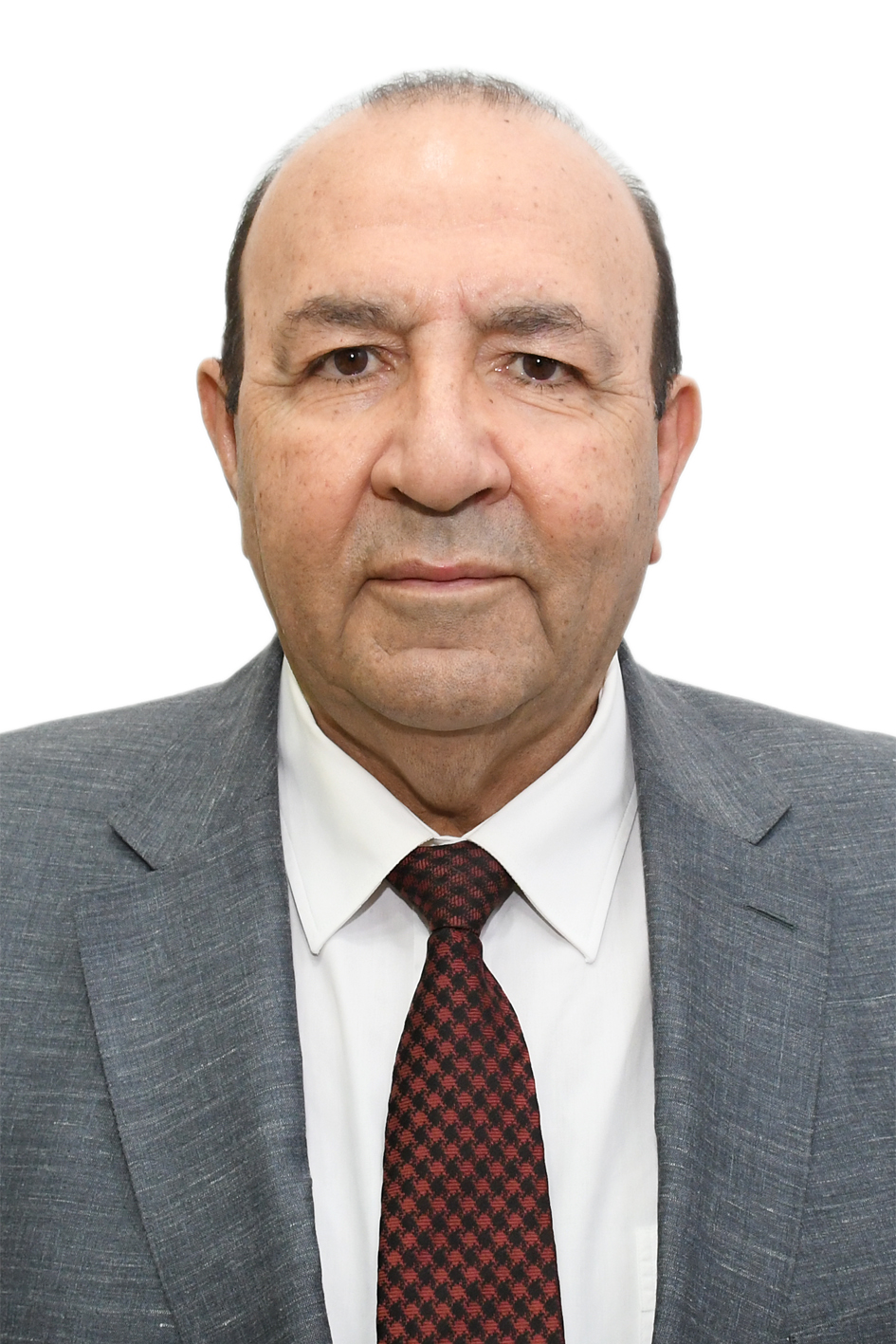
- Asgarov in 2025

Member of the Supreme Assembly of Nakhchivan
- In office 17 November 1990 – 16 December 1995

Personal details
- Born: Asgar Ali oglu Asgarov; 4 March 1955 (age 70) Qoşadizə, Nakhichevan ASSR, Azerbaijan SSR, USSR
- Party: YAP
- Education: Azerbaijan State University
- Occupation: Engineer

Asgar Ali oglu Asgarov (Azerbaijani: Əsgər Əli oğlu Əsgərov; born 4 March 1955) is an Azerbaijani former politician. A member of the New Azerbaijan Party, he served in the Supreme Assembly of Nakhchivan from 1990 to 1995.
