= Babek (city) =

Babek Babək
- Municipality
- Location within Azerbaijan
- Coordinates: 39°09′07″N 45°26′30″E
- Country: Azerbaijan
- Autonomous republic: Nakhchivan
- District: Babek
- Elevation: 827 m (2,713 ft)

Population (2010)
  - Total: 3,252
- Time zone: UTC+4 (AZT)

Babek (Azerbaijani: Babək) is a city, municipality and the capital of Babek District, in the Nakhchivan Autonomous Republic of Azerbaijan.

In 2015, by decree of President of Azerbaijan Republic, Qoşadizə village was liquidated and added into the administrative territory of the city of Babek.

== History ==
Before 1978, the settlement was known as Tazakand (Azerbaijani: Təzəkənd). However, it was then renamed in honour of the medieval Persian revolutionary leader Babak Khorramdin who rebelled against the Abbasids. He was captured and killed in the 9th century.

== Demography ==
As of 2010, Babək had a population of 3252 people.
