= Nəcəfəlidizə =

- Municipality
- Location within Azerbaijan
- Coordinates: 39°13′43″N 45°32′07″E
- Country: Azerbaijan
- Autonomous republic: Nakhchivan
- District: Babek

Population (2005)
  - Total: 147
- Time zone: UTC+4 (AZT)

Nəcəfəlidizə (also, Nəcəfəli Dizə, Nadzhafalidiza, and Nadzhav-Ali-Bek-diza) is a village and the least populous municipality in the Babek District of Nakhchivan, Azerbaijan. It is located 18 km in the north-east from the district center, on the foothill area. Its population mainly is busy with animal husbandry. There are secondary school, library, mosque and a medical center in the village. It has a population of 147.

== Etymology ==
Its previous name was Nəcəfəli Dizə (Najafali Diza). The name was made up from the components of Nəcəfəli (Nəcəfəli is the person name) and Dizə (the old term of Iranian origin, means as "village", "castle", "fortified") means "a village belonging to Nəcəfəli".
