= Bədəşxan =

- Municipality
- Location within Azerbaijan
- Coordinates: 39°12′45″N 45°26′22″E
- Country: Azerbaijan
- Autonomous republic: Nakhchivan
- District: Babek

Population (2005)
  - Total: 281
- Time zone: UTC+4 (AZT)

Badaşqan (also, Badashgan, Badashkan, until 2003;. Bədəşxan and Badashkhan) is a village and municipality in the Babek District of Nakhchivan, Azerbaijan. It is located 6 km in the north from the district center, on the left bank of the Nakhchivanchay River, in the Nakhchivan plain. Its population is busy with grain growing, vegetable-growing and animal husbandry. There are library and a medical center in the village. It has a population of 281.
