= Nazli Najafova =

Azerbaijani educator

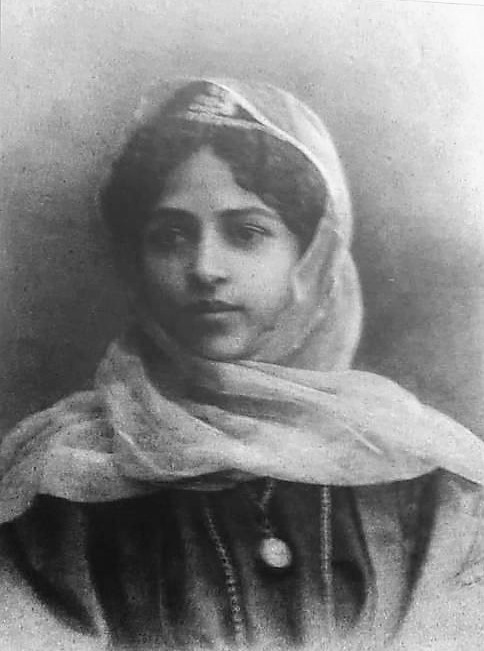
The Azeri educator Nazli Najafova.

Nazli Najafova (Azerbaijani: Nazlı Nəcəfova; 1890–1977) was a pioneering female educator in Azerbaijan. The founder of several academic programs for girls, including the first women's pedagogical school in her home city of Nakhchivan, and a forceful advocate for women's literacy, she was frequently targeted by religious leaders and other authorities for her work. After spending 10 years in exile in Kazakhstan, she returned to Azerbaijan in the late 1940s and continued her educational mission.

== Biography ==
Nazli Najafova was born Nazli Tahirova in Nakhchivan, then part of the Russian Empire, in 1890. She attended the Empress Alexandra Russian Muslim Boarding School for Girls in Baku, becoming one of the first students to graduate in 1908. She was notably influenced by the women's rights activist Jalil Mammadguluzadeh, whom she met in Baku.

After graduating, she moved to Yerevan to be with her family. She taught literacy courses to girls in Yerevan, as a separate class at a boys' school, which earned her death threats. However, she continued teaching the courses in secret.

Najafova then returned to Nakhchivan, where she worked as a teacher at a girls' school. She eventually became the school's principal. Once again, she faced violent pushback to her efforts to educate girls. She was forced to spend more than half her salary on security guards. She persisted, however, and with the help of Ayna Sultanova founded a pedagogical school in Nakhchivan, as well as another girls' school in Ordubad.

In 1921, her home came under attack by a gang that wanted to kill her, but she was away attending the First Congress of Azerbaijani Teachers and the attack was unsuccessful.

Her husband, Najafgulu Najafov—who had supported her in her educational work—was arrested as an "enemy of the people" in 1937. She was then deported to Kazakhstan, where she continued to teach while working in a labor brigade. She returned to Azerbaijan in 1947. Najafov continued to teach after her return from exile, first in Goychay and then back in Nakhchivan. She died in 1977.
