= Nehrəm =

- Municipality
- Location within Azerbaijan
- Coordinates: 39°06′44″N 45°27′40″E
- Country: Azerbaijan
- Autonomous republic: Nakhchivan
- District: Babek

Population (2023)
  - Total: 13,752
- Time zone: UTC+4 (AZT)

Nehrəm (Nehram) is a village and the most populous municipality in the Babek District of Nakhchivan, Azerbaijan. It is located 4 km south of the district center, on the left bank of the Araz River. Its population engages in grain-growing, vine-growing, horticulture, vegetable-growing, and animal husbandry. There are 3 secondary schools, technical and vocational school, club, 4 libraries, kindergarten, music school, the house of schoolchildren, maternity hospital and hospital in the village. It has a population of 13,900 people. The water pipeline was built to the village from 4.3 km distance (1993). Nearby of the village there are workshops of aslant. Until recently, it was Azerbaijan's most populous rural community until surpassed by Ərkivan.

Nehram is a historical village. Imamzada shrine in the village has an ancient history. In the south-west of the village, in the place called Gyzylburun, have been found the ruins of the settlement and cemetery of the Bronze Age. There are residence and cemetery of medieval ages in the territory of the village. The tombstones are content from tombs with inscriptions and stone-sculpted figures of ram.

== Etymology ==
According to the information of the 19th century, in the Nakhchivan province, the water used for irrigation belonged to separate landlords, only in individual cases did it belong to the entire community. One of these communities was the Nehram community. According to researchers, the name was made up with components of words of nəhr (river, canal, running water) and am//əm (community) in the Arabic language and means "water owned by the community". Residents of Nehrəm believe that the name "Nehrəm" is derived from the phrase "Land of Noah" or "Village of Noah." This local legend ties into the broader cultural and historical belief in the region that Mount Ağrı, nearby in Turkey, is the resting place of Noah's Ark after the biblical flood. The association with Noah is strong in Nakhchivan, as it is believed that Noah and his family may have settled in the area after the flood, making Nehrəm part of this ancient heritage.

This belief in the Noah connection is part of the village's cultural identity and reflects the broader historical reverence for Noah's legacy throughout the region.

== Nehram ==
Nehram - is the place of residence of the Middle Ages. The first recorded mentions or historical references to Nehram village in Azerbaijan are believed to have occurred in the 16th to 17th centuries. These references provide some indication of the village's existence during that period, although precise founding details or exact dates might not be available in historical records. Its area is 3 ha. Many remains of artefacts are scattered on the place of residence. The remains of building was completely destroyed. Cultural layer has content from clay with mixture soil. At result of researchings have been found pottery, raw and brick parts, the mainly red and gray pottery (jugs, kasa, lamps, glass etc.) decorated in different ways which typical of the Middle Ages. According to the findings, the monument dates from the 5th-18th centuries.

== J. Mammadguluzade on Nehram ==
In 1885, the first secular school opened in Nehram. J.Mammadguluzadeh more than seven years (15 January 1890 - 10 July 1897) worked as a teacher and supervisor in the Nehram village. In order to facilitate the work of local farmers, in 1893, he achieved bring to the village the first iron plow of "Ekker" firm from Tbilisi. Writer wrote his works as "The game of raisin" (1892), "Stories of the Danabaş village" (1894), "The school of the Danabaş village" (1896) in here. For the first time in the district he involved the girls to the education and has created a museum of school-history. In 1896, J.Mammadguluzade married to the Halima Nagi gyzy from this village. From this marriage was born the first child of writer, Munevver Mammadquluzade.

== Kerim Bey Ismayilov about Nehram ==
The education worker Kerim Bey Ismayilov in the published article, in his collection of the "sbornik materialov dlya opisaniya mestnostey the plemyon Kavkaza" (Tbilisi, 1900, the 27th edition, Section 2, page 192–201), he gave information about the territory, geographical situation, climate, fauna and flora, etymology of the name, constructions, irrigation system, employment of the population, traditions, religious rituals, holidays of the Nehram village.
