= Abdulla Babayev =

- Born: April 1, 1924; Tumbul, Nakhichevan uezd, Nakhichevan Autonomous Soviet Socialist Republic, Azerbaijan SSR, TSFSR, USSR
- Died: March 10, 2015 (aged 90)
- Occupation: singer
- Years active: 1959–2011

Abdulla Murtuz oghlu Babayev (Azerbaijani: Abdulla Murtuz oğlu Babayev, April 1, 1924 – March 10, 2015) was an Azerbaijani singer, People's Artiste of Azerbaijan (1998).

== Biography ==
Abdulla Babayev was born on April 1, 1924, in Tumbul, Nakhichevan uezd. Abdulla Babayev, who graduated from high school in 1941, worked in various positions in the Nakhichevan railway section until 1959.

In 1959–2011, he worked as a soloist of the Nakhchivan State Song and Dance Ensemble. Abdulla Babayev toured Russia, Kazakhstan, Uzbekistan, Tajikistan, Georgia, and Turkey.

Abdulla Babayev died on March 10, 2015.

== Awards ==
- People's Artiste of Azerbaijan — May 24, 1998
- Honored Artist of Nakhichevan MSSR — 1970
