= Haciniyyət =

- Municipality
- Location within Azerbaijan
- Coordinates: 39°11′29″N 45°25′21″E
- Country: Azerbaijan
- Autonomous republic: Nakhchivan

Population (2005)
  - Total: 217
- Time zone: UTC+4 (AZT)

Haciniyyət (also, Hadzhyniyyat and Hajyniyyet) is a village in the municipality of Tumbul in Nakhchivan city, Nakhchivan Autonomous Republic, Azerbaijan. It is located 5 km in the south-east from the city center. Its population is busy with grain-growing, poultry farming, vegetable-growing and animal husbandry. There is a medical center in the village. It has a population of 217.

== History ==
Since June 9, 2009, by the decree of the President of the Azerbaijan Republic, the Tumbul and Haciniyyət villages of the Babek District are included in the scope of the administrative territorial unit of Nakhchivan city.
