= Daşduz =

- Municipality
- Location within Azerbaijan
- Coordinates: 39°17′31″N 45°19′07″E
- Country: Azerbaijan
- Autonomous republic: Nakhchivan
- Time zone: UTC+4 (AZT)

Daşduz (also, Dashduz and Dash-duz) is a settlement in Nakhchivan City, Nakhchivan Autonomous Republic, Azerbaijan. It is located 12 km in the south-west from the Nakhchivan city, on the foothill area. There is no permanent population.

== Etymology ==
The name of the Daşduz settlement made out from the component of the Turkic words of Daş (the rock, stone) and duz (salt) means "the rock-salt". The settlement was so named because the rock-salt mine of Nakhchivan is located in this territory.
