= Nahajir =

Nəhəcir
- Municipality
- Location within Azerbaijan
- Coordinates: 39°15′19″N 45°36′46″E
- Country: Azerbaijan
- Autonomous republic: Nakhchivan
- District: Babek

Population (2005)
  - Total: 514
- Time zone: UTC+4 (AZT)

Nahajir (also, Nahadzir, Nahajir and Nəhəcir) is a village and municipality in the Babek District of Nakhchivan, Azerbaijan. It is located 22 km north of the district center, on the foothill area. Its population is busy with farming and animal husbandry. There are a secondary school, a club, two library and a medical center in the village. It has a population of 514. Until 6 January 2015, it belonged to the neighbouring Julfa District.

== Etymology ==
The name is the distorted form of the name of the Persian word نخجیر Nakhjir which means "hunting area". According to those researchers, this meaning is connected to depictions of the wild rams that found in the territory of the village.

== Historical and archaeological monuments ==
=== Nahajir Fortress ===
Nahajir Fortress - the fortress of the end of the 2nd millennium BC in the flat area on the southern part of the tall and steep rock of the same named mountain, nearby Nahajir village of Babek rayon. The Fortress was discovered by the Nakhchivan archaeological expedition (2001). A axe made of basalt stone, a small stone pestle, pottery fragments in black, gray and pink colors from the same period have been found within its territory. Monochrome-painted pottery from the beginning of the 2nd millennium BC was also found in a destroyed barrow contemporary with the fortress. The Cyclopean-type defensive wall, which was built of large rocks, stands on the terraces of the southern and eastern slopes of the mountain. Their width is 2–2.5 m. The fortress was built by the ancient tribes for the protection from enemy attacks and tribes who build that is developed in cultural aspect and lived on the plain in south slope of the Nahajir Mountain.

=== Nahajir I ===
Nahajir I - the place of residence of the Bronze Age in the north-east of Nahajir village of Babek rayon. It is limited by the Nahajir Mount from the north and by the Nahajir village from the south. Its area is 10 hectares. The thickness of cultural layer is 3 m. From the place of residence were discovered the fragments of the clay pot in monochrome painted in gray and black colored, grain stones, graters and pestle. On one of the glazed monochrome plates found from the place of residence was described painted with black paint a man holding from cord attached to neck of a small animal. The posture of the man on the painting is such that it is hard to imagine the basic economic - domestic scene in here. The most important thing is that the man's hands rose up to the sky. This rite is likely shows faith of the tribes Azerbaijan of the middle Bronze Age. The scene of rite is similar to the Gamigaya drawings. Based on an analysis of the findings, experts, is believed that people have started to settle in this territory which is located in the favorable geographical and strategic position in the end of the third millennium BC.

=== Nahajir Necropolis I ===
Nahajir Necropolis I - the archaeological monument of the Bronze Age in the north end of the settlement of the Nahajir I. From the stone and soil barrows were obtained a monochrome colored hilts, scratching and embossed patterned gray and black potteries which is typical for the first phase of the culture (22nd–18th centuries BC) of Colored Plates of Azerbaijan. The monochrome plates were decorated with broken and wavy lines, geometric shapes (triangle, circle, etc.), drawings of people and animals. The images of the animals, birds and people on the colored plates is similar to the drawings of Gamigaya in its size, schematic and motive.

=== Nahajir II ===
Nahajir II - the archaeological monument of the Middle Ages in the west of the Nahajir village of Babek rayon. The monument is limited from the north by the Nahajir Mountain and stretch towards from the north to the east along through its slope in narrow strip form. It was recorded by the archaeological expedition of Nakhchivan Regional Scientific Center in 1991. The exploration research works were carried out. In the place of residence have been found the remains of building, the big hillock of the ash in two places, were collected the jug in pink colored, the glazed and unglazed ceramic pieces (decorated with geometric and floral patterns).

=== Nahajir Necropolis II ===
Nahajir Necropolis II - the archaeological monument of the Middle Ages on the west side of the Nahajir II settlement, on an oblong hill. The graves in the necropolis directed from the west to the east. There have been a lot of stone ram figures of natural size (15th-16th centuries). On the gravestone monuments were decorated with different sign and paintings.
