= Qaraçuq =

- Municipality
- Location within Azerbaijan
- Coordinates: 39°10′N 45°21′E
- Country: Azerbaijan
- Autonomous republic: Nakhchivan Autonomous Republic

Population (2005)
  - Total: 2,701
- Time zone: UTC+4 (AZT)

Qaraçuq (also, Garachug, Garachyg, Garachukh, and Karachukh) is a village and municipality in the Nakhchivan city of Nakhchivan Autonomous Republic, Azerbaijan. It is located 3 km in the south from the city center, on the plain. Its population is busy with grain-growing, horticulture, vegetable-growing, fruit-growing and animal husbandry. There are secondary school, club, library, cultural house and a medical center in the village. It has a population of 2,701.

== Etymology ==
The name of the Qaraçuq (Garachug) village mentions in the epic of "The Book of Dede Korkut" (7th century). The protagonist of the epic, Qazan Khan is called the "tiger of the Garachug". The Garachukha expression is used by the population of mountain and foothill regions of Azerbaijan. Garachukha is the prototype of the Garachug shepherd whose name is mentioned in "The Book of Dede Korkut".

== History ==
Based on the Soviet-Iranian treaty (1963), in connection of construction of the Araz Water Reservoir, its population was moved to the new territory. In 1969, during the investigations of the "Araz" archaeological and ethnographic expedition of Archeology and Ethnography Institute of the Azerbaijan National Academy of Sciences, in the Xarabaşəhər and Muncuqtəpə settlements of the Middle Ages, near the Garachug were found the rich artifacts of the cultural materials. The name of the Garachug mentioned in the epic of "The Book of Dede Korkut".

Since June 9, 2009, by the decree of the President of the Azerbaijan Republic, the Garachug village of the Babek District is included in the scope of the administrative territorial unit of Nakhchivan city.

== Historical and archaeological monuments ==
=== Garachug Necropolis I ===
Garachug Necropolis I - the archaeological monument of the Bronze Age, 3 km in the east from the city of Nakhchivan, near the Garachug village. It was discovered by chance in 1985. The area of the necropolis was stuck in the middle of the water in the island form when happened the flood in the Araz River, a part of the graves located on the sandy hill were washed out and destroyed. From Necropolis were found the samples of the painted pottery (mainly bowls, pots etc.), bowl-type ceramic containers made of pink colored clay, the pink colored of vase-type containers made from the hewed tuff stone. The findings were being typical for the middle Bronze Age, is assumed that it belongs to the 2100–1900 years of BC.

=== Garachug Necropolis II ===
Garachug Necropolis II - the archaeological monument of the Middle Ages, 3 km in the east from the city of Nakhchivan, near the Garachug village. It flooded and destroyed during the construction of the Araz Water Reservoir. According to information, there were the grave monuments consisting from the tomb-type and stones in form of ram in the necropolis. The headstones of these monuments were made mostly from flat stone slabs; the top side of some of them were completed in the form of crown. There is an inscription in Arabic on a few of them. All of the dead were buried of the Muslim tradition in the necropolis. It is supposed that the monument belongs to the 12th–19th centuries.
