= Tumbul =

Village and municipality in the Nakhchivan Autonomous Republic, Azerbaijan

- Municipality
- Location within Azerbaijan
- Coordinates: 39°10′00″N 45°25′23″E
- Country: Azerbaijan
- Autonomous republic: Nakhchivan

Population (2005)
  - Total: 1,595
- Time zone: UTC+4 (AZT)

Tumbul is a village and municipality in the Nakhchivan city of Nakhchivan Autonomous Republic, Azerbaijan. It is located 5 km in the south from the city center, on the Nakhchivan plain. Its population is mainly busy with grape-growing. There are secondary school, club, library and a medical center in the village. It has a population of 1,595. The municipality consists of the villages of Tumbul and Haciniyyət.

== Etymology ==
According to some researchers, the name is reflects the name of the Kurdish tribe which called dumbuli. This tribe have been moved from Syria to the south of Azerbaijan in the period of the Kara Koyunlu ruler Qara Yusuf (1410–20) and later they served to the Gyzylbashs. At the present in Iran, the remains of this tribe are known as isabeyli. At the Safavid period, a part of the dumbulis have moved to the north of the Azerbaijan.

== History ==
Since June 9, 2009, by the decree of the President of the Azerbaijan Republic, the Tumbul and Haciniyyət villages of the Babek District are included in the scope of the administrative territorial unit of Nakhchivan city.

== Monuments ==
St. Hovhannes Church was a ruinous Armenian church located in the center of the village and was completely destroyed in 1997–2005.

== Notable people ==
- Abdulla Babayev (1924-2015) - singer

== See also ==
- St. Hovhannes Church (Tumbul)
