= Başbaşı =

- Municipality
- Location within Azerbaijan
- Coordinates: 39°13′17″N 45°16′21″E
- Country: Azerbaijan
- Autonomous republic: Nakhchivan
- Time zone: UTC+4 (AZT)

Başbaşı (also, Bashbashi and Bash-bashy) is a settlement in the municipality of Nakhchivan in Nakhchivan City, Nakhchivan Autonomous Republic, Azerbaijan. It is located 12 km in the south-west from the Nakhchivan city, on the bank of the Araz River. The station in the railway line of the Baku-Nakhchivan. It was founded during the construction of the railway line (1908) of the Ulukhanlu (present Armenia) - Julfa. It has not permanent population. The salt which have got out from the salt mine of Nakhchivan, were brought to the station of Bashbashi via cable. At present, the station is used as a meeting point of the trains. There is a terminal. The settlement covers an area of 3.2 hectares.

== Etymology ==
The name of the settlement made out from the components of baş (up, upper, height) and başı (top, over). The altitude in the bank of the Araz River opens from there toward to the city of Nakhchivan. The highest place of the hill is called Baş (bash) among the local population. The settlement has been called Başbaşı (the top of the height) due its location here.
