= Yuxarı Buzqov =

- Municipality
- Location within Azerbaijan
- Coordinates: 39°31′25″N 45°21′55″E
- Country: Azerbaijan
- Autonomous republic: Nakhchivan
- District: Babek

Population
  - Total: 154
- Time zone: UTC+4 (AZT)

Yuxarı Buzqov (also, Yukhari-Buzgov and Yukhary Buzgov) is a village and municipality in the Babek District of Nakhchivan, Azerbaijan. It has a population of 154.
