= Qarğalıq, Nakhchivan =

Qarağalıq
- Municipality
- Location within Azerbaijan
- Coordinates: 39°12′03″N 45°21′51″E
- Country: Azerbaijan
- Autonomous republic: Nakhchivan
- Time zone: UTC+4 (AZT)

Qarağalıq (also, Garghalyg, Gargalig and Karqalyk) is a settlement in the municipality of Nakhchivan in Nakhchivan City, Nakhchivan Autonomous Republic, Azerbaijan. It is located 7 km in the south-west from the city center, on the bank of the Araz River. The station in the railway line of the Baku-Nakhchivan. It was founded during the construction of the railway line (1908) of the Ulukhanlu (present Armenia) - Julfa. It does not have a permanent population. There is a train station with one terminal.

== Etymology ==
The name of Qarğalıq settlement made out from the components of qarqa//karqa (name one of the Turkic tribe) and suffix -lıq (used in meaning of belonging) means "(village) belonging to the tribe of Qarqa". In one of the sources, the ethnonym of Karqa is mentioned as the name of a branch of one of the Karakalpaks tribes. This name can be found among the nations of the Western Siberia, also among the Kyrgyzs and Uzbeks. The toponyms of Karqalı in the Tatarstan, Karqalı in the North Kazakhstan, Karqalıq in the Crimea have been registered at the last century.
