= St. Hovhannes Church (Tumbul) =

Armenian church in Azerbaijan

St. Hovhannes Church of Tambat
- Սուրբ Հովհաննես եկեղեցի
- St. Hovhannes Church of Tambat
- Location: Tumbul
- Country: Azerbaijan
- Denomination: Armenian Apostolic Church

History
- Status: Destroyed
- Founded: 16th or 17th century

Architecture
- Demolished: 1997–2005

St. Hovhannes Church was an Armenian church located in village of Tumbul of the Nakhchivan Autonomous Republic of Azerbaijan. The church was located in the center of the village.

== History ==
The church was founded in the 16th or 17th century and was renovated in the 19th century. In 1868, a bilingual Armenian and Russian school was opened in the church. The church had already been a target of destruction in the late Soviet period; the western, northern, and southern walls of the church were completely razed to the ground, but the two-storied bell tower was still standing. By March 12, 2005, whatever was remaining from the church had been razed and the vacant plot walled off for reuse as a garden.
