= Mardpetakan =

Historical region of Armenia

Mardpetakan (Armenian: Մարդպետական) was a historical region and principality within the province of Vaspurakan of Armenia. It stretched in between the principality of Andzewatsʻi in Corduene, south of Lake Van, to Siunik, north of Araxes river.

The name of the region derives from the title "Mardpet," which was originally the title of the dynastic prince of the Mardian people (the Mardoi of Greco-Roman sources), but later became the title of a high-ranking official (called the "Grand Chamberlain of Armenia" by modern historians) in the court of the Arsacid kings of Armenia. In the view of historian Cyril Toumanoff, the tribal lands of the Mardians eventually became the property of the Armenian crown and were given to the Grand Chamberlain for governance, who in turn acquired the title "Mardpet."

Historian Robert H. Hewsen believed the Mardians to have formed a Median enclave in Armenia who were perhaps the ancestors of the later Kurds who inhabited this part of Armenia, writing that "the Mardians inhabited a region thinly settled by Armenians and overwhelmingly Kurdish (Mard = ‘Kurd’ in medieval Armenian)" even before the dispersal of the Armenians between 1895 and 1917." The Amatuni princes of Artaz, who were possibly of Median origin, may have ruled over the whole of Mardpetakan before it became a royal land.

According to Hewsen, Mardpetakan probably included the following districts: Mardastan (land of the Mards), Bun Mardastan ("main" or "original" land of the Mards), Chuashṛot, Tʻoṛnawan, Ardzishakovit, Khughanovit, Aghandṛot, Krchunikʻ, and Nakhchawan. In another work, Hewsen gives the ten districts of Mardpetakan as follows: Mardastan/Mardutsʻaykʻ, Toṛnawan, Chuashṛot, Krchunikʻ, Aghandṛot, Gaṛni, Bakʻ(r)an, Marand, Gabitʻean, and Nakhchawan.

After the dethroning of the last Arsacid king of Armenia in 428, Mardpetakan passed to the Artsruni dynasty, who would later establish the Kingdom of Vaspurakan in the 10th century. After the repartition of Armenia between Byzantium and Sasanian Iran in 591, Mardpetakan, along with seven other nearby principalities, was made a part of the royal province called Vazurg Armanān ("Greater Armenia") of the Sasanian realm.

== Sources ==
- Garsoïan, Nina G.; Mahé, Jean-Pierre; Thomson, Robert (1997). From Byzantium to Iran : Armenian studies in honour of Nina G. Garsoïan. Scholars Press. ISBN 0-7885-0152-6.
- Hakobyan, Tʻ. Kh.; Melikʻ-Bakhshyan, St. T.; Barseghyan, H. Kh. (1991). "Mardpetakan ashkharh". Hayastani ev harakitsʻ shrjanneri teghanunneri baṛaran [Dictionary of toponymy of Armenia and adjacent territories] (in Armenian). Vol. 3. Yerevan State University. p. 729.
- Hewsen, Robert H. (1992). The Geography of Ananias of Širak (Ašxarhacʻoycʻ): The Long and the Short Recensions. Wiesbaden: Dr. Ludwig Reichert Verlag. ISBN 3-88226-485-3.
- Hovannisian, Richard G., ed. (2000). Armenian Van/Vaspurakan. Historic Armenian Cities and Provinces. Costa Mesa, California: Mazda Publishers.
