= Naxçıvançay =

River in the Caucasus region

Coordinates: 39°07′41″N 45°23′46″E

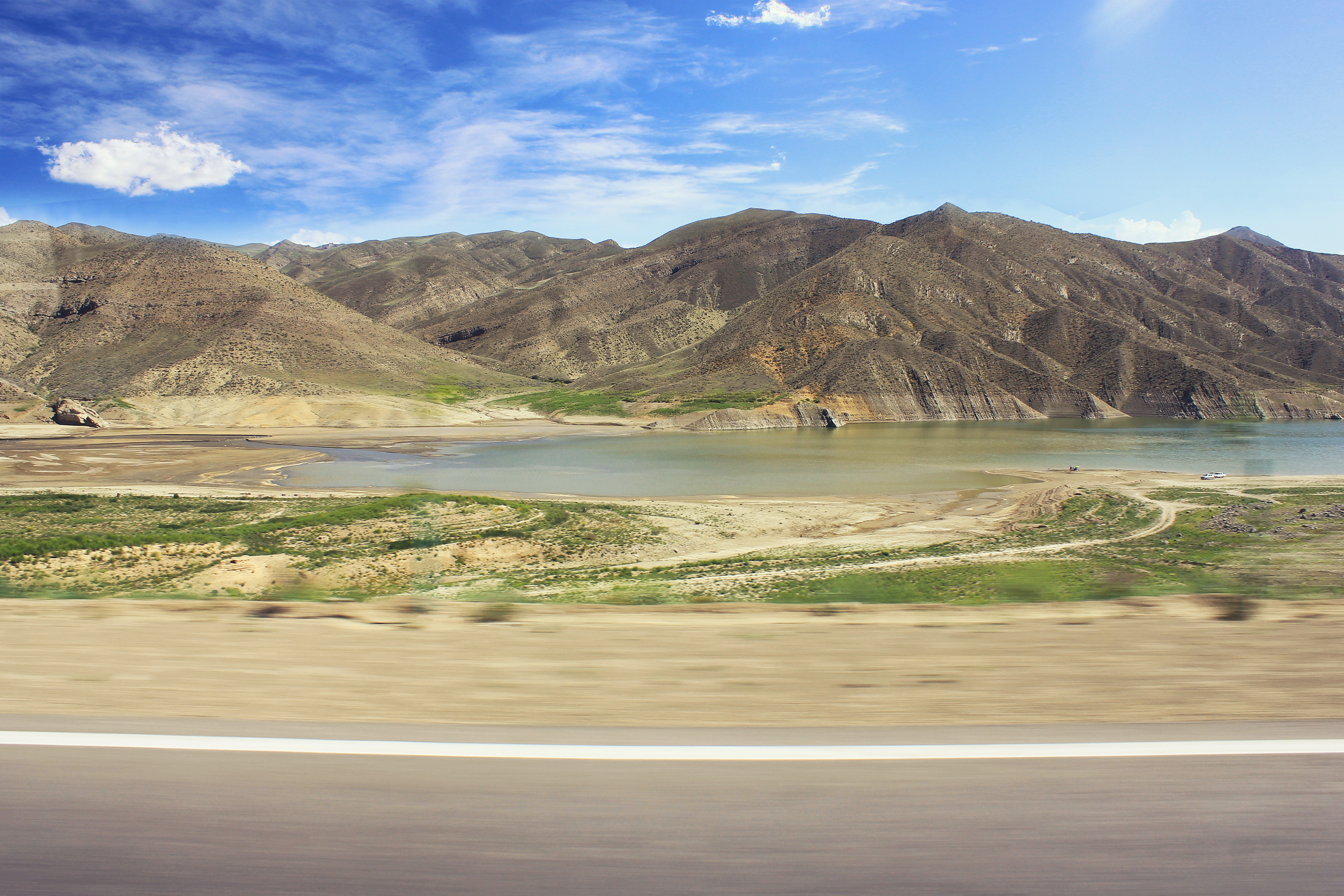

Location
- Country: Azerbaijan

The Naxçıvançay (English: Nakhchivan river) is a river in the Babek and Shahbuz Districts (Nakhchivan Autonomous Republic) in Azerbaijan.

== Details ==
Naxçıvançay is a left tributary of the Aras River. It is considered the largest and most watery river of the Nakhchivan Autonomous Republic. The river is 81 kilometres long and has a basin area of 1630 square kilometres. Its source is located on the southern slope of the Daralayaz range at an absolute altitude of 2,720 m. The total slope of the riverbed (the slope of the fall) is 1972 m.

The area around Naxçıvançay consists mainly of grasslands, with sparse population of roughly 47 inhabitants per square kilometer.
