= Qaraxanbəyli, Nakhchivan =

Qaraxanbəyli
- Municipality
- Location within Azerbaijan
- Coordinates: 39°11′17″N 45°23′29″E
- Country: Azerbaijan
- Autonomous republic: Nakhchivan Autonomous Republic

Population (2005)
  - Total: 2,397
- Time zone: UTC+4 (AZT)

Qaraxanbəyli (also, Garakhanbeyli) is a village and municipality in the Nakhchivan city of Nakhchivan Autonomous Republic, Azerbaijan. It is located in the south of the city of Nakhchivan, next to it. The international railway of Azerbaijan used to be passed through the village. Its population is busy with grain-growing, vegetable-growing, animal husbandry, fruit-growing and horticulture. There are secondary school, club, library, cultural center and a medical center in the village. It has a population of 2,397.

== Etymology ==
The settlement was founded by the tribe of Garakhanbeyli of Turkic Kengerlis. In the middle of the 18th century, a part of the qaraxanbəyli tribe has been resettled in the Karabakh Khanate by the Panah Ali Khan.

== History ==
Since June 9, 2009, the Garakhanbeyli village of Babak region are included in the scope of administrative-territorial unit of Nakhchivan.

== Notable natives ==
- Mirasgar Seyidov — National Hero of Azerbaijan.
