= Qoşadizə, Babek =

Goshadiza
- Municipality
- Azerbaijani: Qoşadizə
- Location within Azerbaijan
- Coordinates: 39°10′3″N 45°26′12″E
- Country: Azerbaijan
- Autonomous republic: Nakhchivan
- District: Babek

Population
  - Total: 1,283
- Time zone: UTC+4 (AZT)
  - Summer (DST): UTC+5 (AZT)

Qoşadizə (also, Qoşa Dizə and Goshadiza) is a village and municipality in the Babek District of Nakhchivan Autonomous Republic, Azerbaijan. It has a population of 1,283.
