= Babek District =

District of the Nakhchivan Autonomous Republic, Azerbaijan

Coordinates: 39°09′N 45°26′E

- District
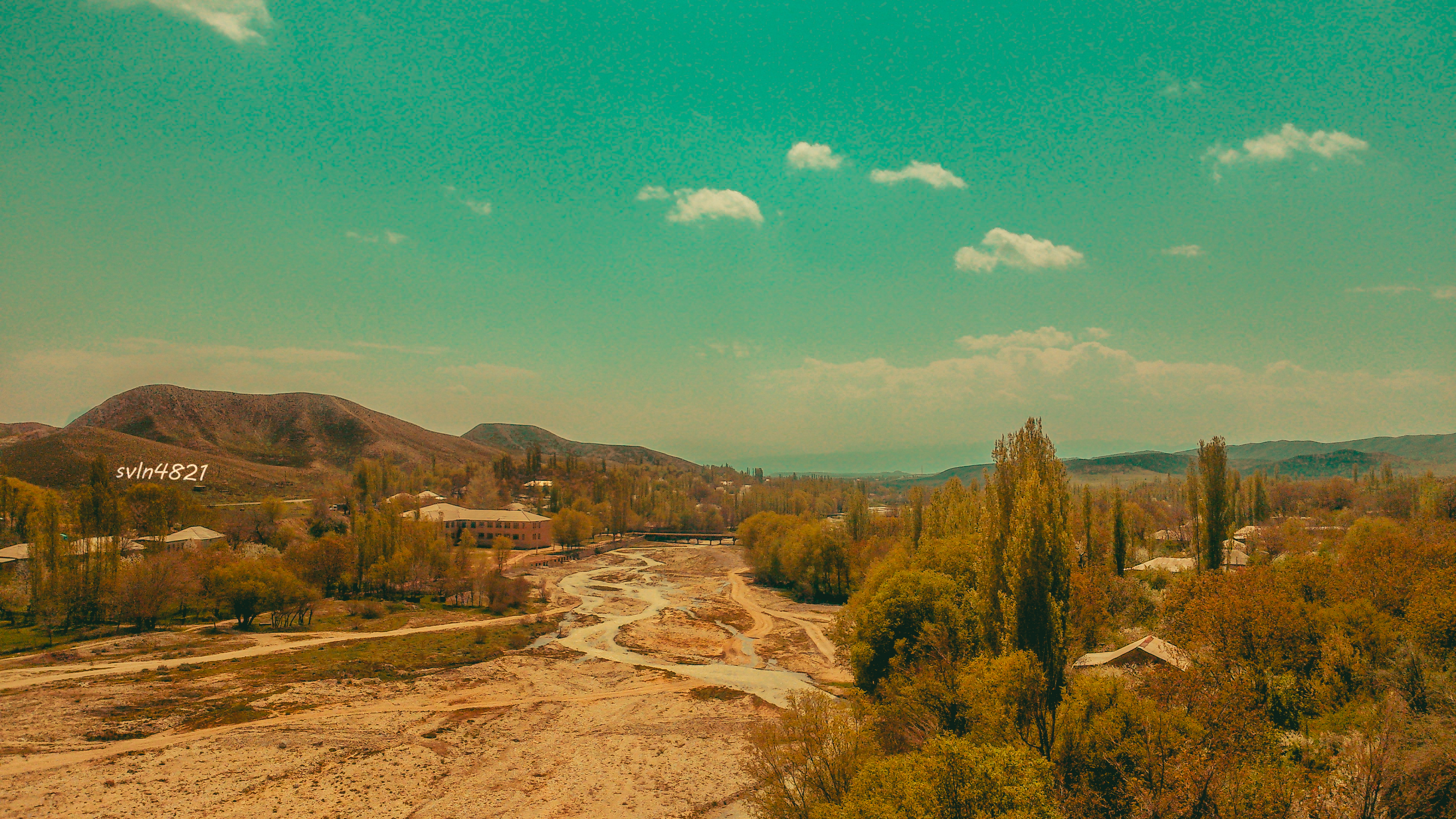

- Map of Azerbaijan showing Babek District
- Country: Azerbaijan
- Autonomous Republic: Nakhchivan
- Established: 23 October 1978
- Capital: Babek
- Settlements: 36

Government
  - Governor: Rasim Huseynov

Area
  - Total: 760 km^{2} (290 sq mi)

Population (2020)
  - Total: 76,200
  - Density: 100/km^{2} (260/sq mi)
- Time zone: UTC+4 (AZT)
- Postal code: 6700
- Website: babek-ih.nakhchivan.az

Babek District (Azerbaijani: Babək rayonu) is one of the seven districts of the Nakhchivan Autonomous Republic of Azerbaijan. The district borders the districts of Julfa, Shahbuz, Kangarli, Nakhchivan city, as well as the Vayots Dzor Province of Armenia and the East Azerbaijan and West Azerbaijan provinces of Iran. Its capital and largest city is Babek. As of 2020, the district had a population of 76,200.

== History ==
It was formerly known as Nakhchivan District (till 1978). The district named in honour of Babak Khorramdin, an Iranian who led a 23-year-long uprising against the Abbasid Caliphate in Iranian Azerbaijan.

== Overview ==
The Babek region was founded under the initiative of the National Leader of the Azerbaijani people Heydar Aliyev in 1978. Tezekend, located 6 km south-east from Nakhchivan, was determined as the centre of the region and named the settlement Babek. Babek is a settlement of urban type. The region of Babek is bordered with the regions Kangarli in the west, Shahbuz in north-east and Julfa in the east, The Islamic Republic of Iran in the South and Armenia in the north-east.

== Geography ==
The south mountain foot of the chain Daralayaz in the north, the hills and highlands the tail of mountain Zangazur in the south-east, Nakhchivan slanting plain in the south and Gulustan plain in the south-east make the relief of the region. The highest peak is the mountain Buzgov (2475). The territory of the region Babek is rich in minerals, such as stone, salt and building materials. The mineral springs Sirab, Vaykhir, Jahri, Gahab and others are also found in this region. The main rivers of the region are Nakhchivanchay which divides the territory of the administrative region and its flow Jehrichay. They play important role in irrigation. One can also find in the region reservoir of Araz Water Junction, also reservoirs Uzunoba, Nehram, Sirab, Jahri and Gahab and irrigation canals.

== Administrative changes ==
Since June 9, 2009, by the decree of the President of the Azerbaijan Republic, the Bulqan, Qaraçuq, Qaraxanbəyli, Tumbul and Haciniyyət villages of the Babek District were given to the administration of the administrative territorial unit of Nakhchivan city.

On November 28, 2014, by the decree of the President of Azerbaijan Republic, the Nəhəcir and Göynük villages of the Julfa District were given to the administration of the Babek District.

In 2015, by decree of President of Azerbaijan Republic, Qoşadizə village was liquidated and added into the administrative territory of the city of Babek.

== Population ==
According to the State Statistics Committee, as of 2018, the population of city recorded 75,000 persons, which increased by 2,500 persons (about 0.03 percent) from 72,500 persons in 2000. 37,400 of total population are men, 37,600 are women. More than 26,2 percent of the population (about 19,700 persons) consists of young people and teenagers aged 14–29.

Population of city (at the beginning of the year, thsd. persons)
| Region | 2000 | 2001 | 2002 | 2003 | 2004 | 2005 | 2006 | 2007 | 2008 | 2009 | 2010 | 2011 | 2012 | 2013 | 2014 | 2015 | 2016 | 2017 | 2018 |
|---|---|---|---|---|---|---|---|---|---|---|---|---|---|---|---|---|---|---|---|
| Babek region | 72,5 | 73,5 | 74,6 | 75,3 | 65,7 | 66,9 | 67,9 | 68,9 | 70,1 | 62,6 | 63,7 | 65,1 | 66,9 | 68,7 | 70,4 | 72,3 | 73,3 | 74,3 | 75,0 |
| urban population | 2,9 | 3,0 | 3,0 | 3,0 | 3,1 | 3,2 | 3,2 | 3,3 | 3,4 | 3,3 | 3,3 | 3,4 | 3,6 | 3,7 | 3,8 | 3,8 | 5,6 | 5,6 | 5,7 |
| rural population | 69,6 | 70,5 | 71,6 | 72,3 | 62,6 | 63,7 | 64,7 | 65,6 | 66,7 | 59,3 | 60,4 | 61,7 | 63,3 | 65,0 | 66,6 | 68,5 | 67,7 | 68,7 | 69,3 |

== See also ==
- Nehrəm mine
