= List of rivers of Iran =

This is a list of the rivers that flow wholly or partly in Iran, arranged geographically by river basin from west to east.

== Flowing into the Persian Gulf ==
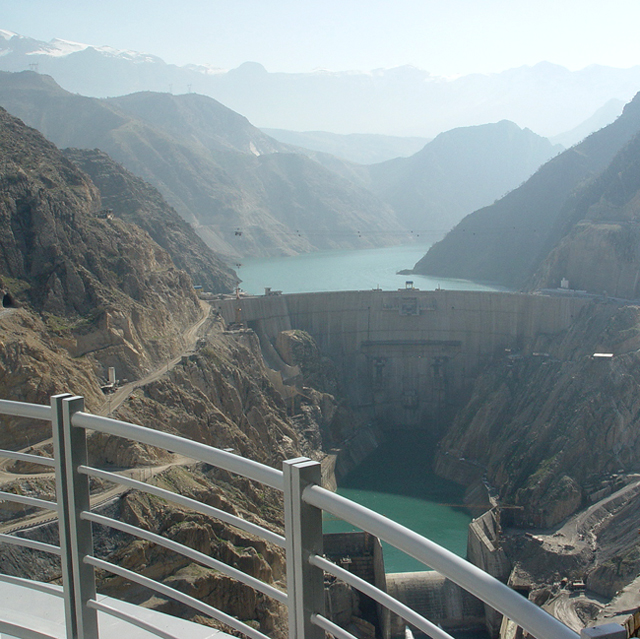
The Karun-3 dam, one of the many large power dams on the Karun River

- Arvand Rud
  - Haffar, originally an artificial channel now forming the estuary of the Karun
  - Karun River
    - Marun River
    - Dez River
      - Bakhtiari River
      - Koohrang
- Tigris (Iraq)
    - Karkheh River
      - Seimareh River
    - Chankula River
    - Sirwan River (Diyala River)
      - Alwand River
    - Little Zab
- Bahmanshir, the original mouth of the Karun
- Jarahi
- Zohreh River
- Helleh River
- Mond River
  - Shur River
- Mehran River
- Kul River
  - Gowdeh River
  - Rostam River

== Flowing into the Gulf of Oman ==
- Dozdan River
- Jagin River
- Gabrik River
- Bahu Kalat River (or Dashtiari River or Silup River)

== Flowing into endorheic basins ==
=== Lake Urmia ===
- Aji Chay
  - Quri Chay
- Zarrineh River
- Gadar River
- Ghaie River
- Alamlou River
- Leylan River
- Simineh River
- Mahabad River
- Barandouz River
- Shahar River
- Nazlou River
- Rozeh River
- Zola River

=== Caspian Sea ===
- Kura River (Azerbaijan)
  - Aras River
    - Balha River
      - Tulun River
    - Zangmar River
      - Barun River
- Sefid River
  - Qizil Üzan
  - Shah River
    - Alamut River
- Cheshmeh Kileh River
  - Do Hezar River
  - Se Hezar River
- Chalus River
  - Sardab River
- Kojoor River
- Haraz River
  - Noor River
  - Lar River
- Atrek River
  - Chandyr River
  - Sumbar River
- Qarasu River

=== Namak Lake ===
- Abhar River
- Qom River
- Jajrood River
- Karaj River

=== Gavkhouni ===
- Zayande River

=== Hamun-e Jaz Murian ===
- Halil River
- Bampur River

=== Sistan Basin ===
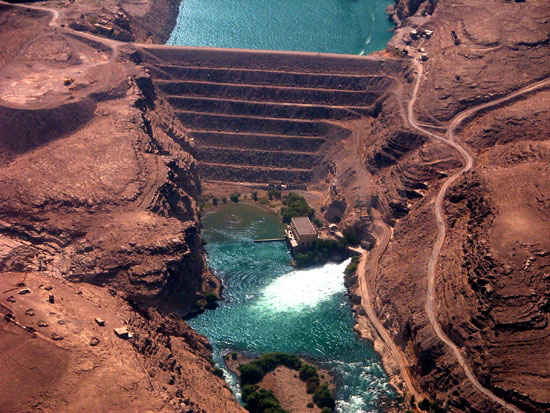
The Kajaki Dam on the Helmand River provides flood control, power and irrigation water to the Helmand Valley. Without the dam, the surrounding region would be arid and would not be able to produce crops.

- Helmand River

=== Hamun-i-Mashkel ===
- Mashkid River (Mashkel River)

=== Karakum Desert ===
- Harirud
  - Kashaf River

== Other ==
- Shesh Taraz
- Lake Tar
