= Simeneh =

Simeneh (Persian: سيمينه), also rendered as Siminah or Simineh, may refer to:

- Simineh River
- Simeneh-ye Olya
- Simeneh-ye Sofla
