= Charles A. Burney =

British archaeologist (1930–2024)

Charles Allen Burney (1930 – 10 November 2024) was a British archaeologist known for his discovery of Urartian sites in Turkey in the 1950s and his excavations at Yanik Tepe, Tabriz, Iran from 1960 to 1962.

== Early life ==
Burney was born in 1930 and educated at Eton College and King's College, Cambridge.

== Career ==
Burney was a scholar and fellow of the British Institute of Archaeology at Ankara from 1954–56 when he carried out archaeological investigations in Turkey and later in Iran. He is particularly known for his identification and sketch surveying of numerous Urartian sites during field expeditions made to the Lake Van region in the mid 1950s and his excavations at Yanik Tepe, Tabriz, Iran from 1960 to 1962. Yanik Tepe is a multi-period site northwest of Lake Urmia with nine phases, including some of the earliest settlements in the region. A collection of studies in his honour, A View from the Highlands &c., was published by Peeters in 2004. Burney has contributed articles to Anatolian Studies and Iran. He was senior lecturer at the University of Manchester.

== Selected publications ==
- The peoples of the hills: Ancient Ararat and Caucasus. Weidenfeld & Nicolson, London, 1971. (With David Marshall Lang) (History of Civilization)
- From village to empire: An introduction to Near Eastern Archaeology. Phaidon, Oxford, 1997. ISBN 0714817309
- Historical dictionary of the Hittites. Scarecrow Press, Lanham, 2004. ISBN 0810849364 (Historical dictionaries of ancient civilizations and historical eras, no. 14.) (Republished by Scarecro Press as The A to Z of the Hittites, 2010.)
