= Lake Urmia =

Salt lake in Iran

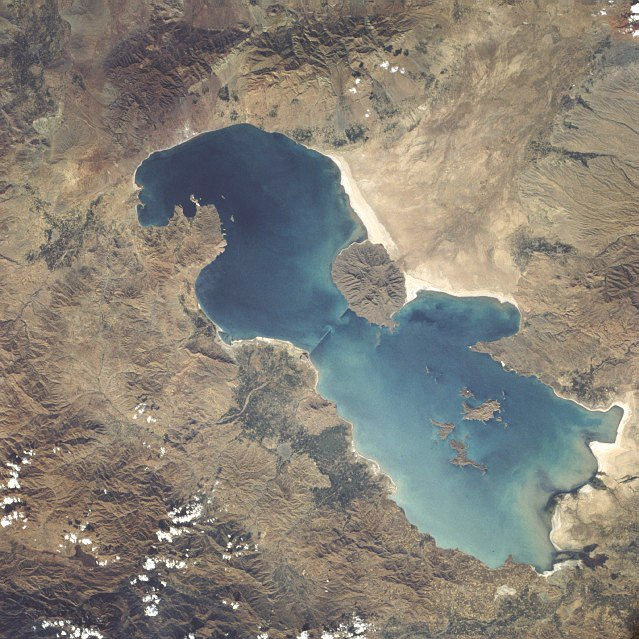
- Lake Urmia from space in 1984

- Location within Iran
- Interactive map of Lake Urmia
- Coordinates: 37°42′N 45°22′E
- Type: salt (hypersaline) lake
- Primary inflows: Zarriné-Rūd, Simineh-Rūd, Mahabad River, Gadar River, Barandouz River, Shahar River, Nazlou River, Zola River, Kaftar Ali Chay, Aji Chay, Boyuk Chay, Rudkhaneh-ye Qal'eh Chay, Qobi Chay, Rudkhaneh-ye Mordaq, Leylan River; diversion from the Zab River
- Primary outflows: none: all water entering the lake is lost through evaporation
- Basin countries: Iran
- Max. length: 140 km (87 mi) [1995]
- Max. width: 70 km (43 mi) [1995]
- Surface area: 6,000 km^{2} (2,300 sq mi) [2021-april]
- Average depth: 6 to 8 m (20 to 26 ft) [1910–2012]
- Max. depth: 15 to 20 m (49 to 66 ft) [1910–2012]
- Water volume: 5.5 km^{3} (1.3 cu mi) [2021]
- Salinity: 217–235 g L^{−1} Na–(Mg)–Cl–(SO_{4}) brine [20th c.] 8–11% in spring, 26–28% in late autumn
- Islands: 102 [1995] (see list)

Ramsar Wetland
- Official name: Lake Urmia [or Orumiyeh]
- Designated: 23 June 1975
- Reference no.: 38

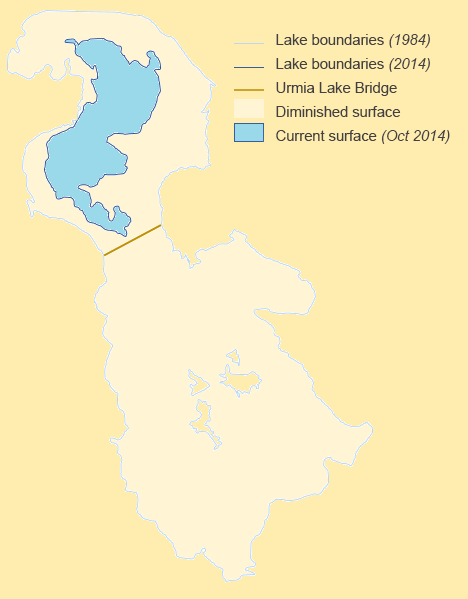
Diminishing of surface of Lake Urmia

Lake Urmia (Note: Persian: دریاچهٔ ارومیه, romanized: Daryâče-ye Orumiye; Azerbaijani: اۇرمۇ گؤلۆ, romanized: Urmu gölü; Kurdish: گۆلائوو رمیەیێ, romanized: Gola Ûrmiyeyê; Armenian: Ուրմիա լիճ, romanized: Urmia lich; Imperial Aramaic: ܝܡܬܐ ܕܐܘܪܡܝܐ) is an endorheic salt lake in Iran. The lake is located in the Iranian region of Azerbaijan, near the Armenian border and south of the Caspian Sea. At its greatest extent, it was the largest lake in West Asia. It was once the sixth-largest saltwater lake on Earth, with a surface area of approximately 6,000 km^{2} (2,300 sq mi), a length of 140 km (87 mi), a width of 70 km (43 mi), and a maximum depth of 20 m (66 ft).

By late 2017, the lake had shrunk to 10% of its former size (and 1/60 of water volume in 1998) due to persistent general drought in Iran, but also the damming of the rivers that flow into it, and the pumping of groundwater from the surrounding area. This dry spell was broken in 2019 and the lake began filling up once again, due to both increased rain and water diversion from the Zab River under the Urmia Lake Research Programme. The trend reversed again in early 2020s, and a combination of drought and administrative mismanagement caused a renewed acute drop in water levels. Based on NASA's satellite imagery, the lake had almost entirely dried up by September 2025. After massive rainfall across the Fertile Crescent, along with the mass release of surplus water from dams and dredging of canals, in early 2026, the water level in Lake Urmia rose to its highest in five years.

Lake Urmia, along with its approximately 102 (former) islands, is protected as a national park by the Iranian Department of Environment.

== Names and etymologies ==
Richard Nelson Frye suggested an Urartian origin for the name, while T. Burrow connected the origin of the name Urmia to Indo-Iranian urmi- "wave" and urmya- "undulating, wavy". A more likely etymology would be from Neo-Aramaic (Sureth) spoken by the shrinking number of the ancient Christian population of the nearby city of Urmia, consisting of ur meaning "city," and mia meaning "water." Together, the "water city", what Urmia city is: a city on the waters of the eponymous lake. The name could also derive from the combination of the Assyrian Aramaic words Ur (ܐܘܪ; a common name for cities around Mesopotamia, meaning "city") and Mia (Syriac: ܡܝܐ, lit. 'water'), "City of Water" referring to the city nearby.

Locally, the lake is referred to in Persian as Daryâče-ye Orumiye (دریاچهٔ ارومیه), in Azerbaijani as Urmu gölü (اۇرمۇ گؤلۆ). The traditional Armenian name is Kaputan tsov (Կապուտան ծով), literally "blue sea".

Its Old Persian name was Chichast, meaning "glittering", a reference to the glittering mineral particles suspended in the water of the lake and found along its shores. The Greeks called it Spauta (Σπαῦτα), and also it was probably the same as the Μαρτιανὴ λίμνη of Ptolemy.

== Archaeology and history ==
Yanik Tepe is a prehistoric site on the east shore of Lake Urmia, that has been excavated in the 1950s and 1960s by C. A. Burney. This area has been settled as far back as 6000 BC. There's a large group of sites south of Lake Urmia that have been excavated. They include Dalma Tepe, Teppe Hasanlu, and Geoy Tepe. Hajji Firuz Tepe may have been the earliest of these sites.

Se Girdan kurgans are located on the south shore of Lake Urmia. Some of them were excavated in 1968 and 1970 by O. Muscarella. They have now been redated to the second half of the 4th millennium, although originally they were thought to be much younger.

One of the early mentions of Lake Urmia is from Assyrian records of the 9th century BCE. There, in the records from the reign of Shalmaneser III (858–824 BCE), two names are mentioned in the area of Lake Urmia: Parsuwaš (i.e. the Persians) and Matai (i.e. the Mitanni). It is not completely clear whether these referred to places or tribes, or what their relationship was to the subsequent list of personal names and "kings". But the Matai were Medes and linguistically the name Parsuwaš matches the Old Persian word pārsa, an Achaemenid ethnolinguistic designation.

In the last five hundred years the area around Lake Urmia has been home to Azerbaijanis, Kurds, Persians, Assyrians, and Armenians. The Assyrians of Urmia speak Northeastern Neo-Aramaic dialects and are religiously diverse, adhering to the East Syriac churches (mostly to the Assyrian Church of the East and the Chaldean Catholic Church), and Protestantism.

== Chemistry ==
The main cations in the lake water include Na^{+}, K^{+}, Ca^{2+}, Li^{+} and Mg^{2+}, while Cl^{−}, SO^{2−}_{4}, HCO^{−}_{3} are the main anions. The Na^{+} and Cl^{−} concentration is roughly four times the concentration of natural seawater.

The lake is divided into north and south, separated by the Urmia Lake Bridge and its associated causeway, which was completed in 2008. The bridge provides only a 1.5-kilometre (0.93 mi) gap in the embankment, allowing little exchange of water between the two sections. Due to drought and increased demands for agricultural water in the lake's basin, the salinity of the lake has risen to more than 300 g/L during recent years, and large areas of the lake bed have been desiccated.

== Ecology ==
UNESCO Biosphere Reserves in Iran

=== Modern ecology ===
Based on the latest checklists of biodiversity at Lake Urmia in 2014 and 2016, it is home to 62 species of archaebacteria and bacteria, 42 species of microfungi, 20 species of phytoplankton, 311 species of plants, five species of mollusca, 226 species of birds, 27 species of amphibians and reptiles and 24 species of mammals (47 fossils have been recorded in the area).

Lake Urmia is an internationally registered protected area as both a UNESCO Biosphere Reserve and a Ramsar site. The Iranian Department of Environment has designated most of the lake as a national park.

A recent drought has significantly decreased the annual amount of water the lake receives. This in turn has increased the salinity of the lake's water, reducing its viability as home to thousands of migratory birds, including flamingo populations. The salinity has particularly increased in the half of the lake north of the Urmia Lake Bridge.

By virtue of its high salinity, the lake no longer sustains any fish species. Nonetheless, Urmia Lake is considered a significant natural habitat of Artemia, which serve as food source for the migratory birds such as flamingos. In early 2013, the then-head of the Iranian Artemia Research Center was quoted that Artemia urmiana had gone extinct due to the drastic increases in salinity. However this assessment has been contradicted, and another population of this species has recently been discovered in the Koyashskoye Salt Lake at the Crimean Peninsula.

=== Falling level and increasing salinity ===
The lake is a major barrier between Urmia and Tabriz, two of the most important cities in the provinces of East Azerbaijan and West Azerbaijan. A project to build a highway across the lake was initiated in the 1970s but was abandoned after the Iranian Revolution of 1979, leaving a 15 km (9.3 mi) causeway with an unbridged gap. The project was revived in the early 2000s, and was completed in November 2008 with the opening of the 1.5 km (0.93 mi) Urmia Lake Bridge across the remaining gap. The highly saline environment is already heavily rusting the steel on the bridge despite anti-corrosion treatment. Experts have warned that the construction of the causeway and bridge, together with a series of ecological factors, will eventually lead to the drying up of the lake, turning it into a salt marsh, which will adversely affect the climate of the region.

Lake Urmia has been shrinking for a long time, with an annual evaporation rate of 0.6 to 1 m (24 to 39 in). Although measures are now being taken to reverse the trend, the lake has shrunk by 60% and could disappear entirely. Only 5% of the lake's water remains.

On 2 August 2012, Mohammad-Javad Mohammadizadeh, the head of Iran's Environment Protection Organization, announced that Armenia had agreed to transfer water to counter the critical fall in Lake Urmia's water level, remarking that "hot weather and a lack of precipitation have brought the lake to its lowest water levels ever recorded". He added that recovery plans for the lake included the transfer of water from Eastern Azerbaijan Province. Previously, Iranian authorities had announced a plan to transfer water from the Aras River, which borders Iran and Azerbaijan, but the 950-billion-toman plan was abandoned due to Azerbaijan's objections.

Satellite imagery from 1984 to 2018, revealing Lake Urmia's diminishing surface area

In July 2014, Iran President Hassan Rouhani approved plans for a 14 trillion rial program (over $500 million) in the first year of a recovery plan. The money was supposed to be used for water management, reducing farmers' water use, and environmental restoration. Several months earlier, in March 2014, Iran's Department of Environment and the United Nations Development Programme (UNDP) issued a plan to save the lake and the nearby wetland, which called for spending $225 million in the first year and $1.3 billion overall for restoration.

Starting in 2016, Food and Agriculture Organization of the United Nations (FAO) and Urmia Lake Restoration Program (ULRP) signed up to a project funded by the Government of Japan entitled "An Integrated Programme for Sustainable Water Resources Management in the Lake Urmia Basin" to support ULRP in its goal to restore Lake Urmia. The project set out a multi-disciplinary framework covering several key interrelated areas and aims to have five outputs: 1. An advanced water accounting (WA) system for the entire Lake Urmia basin; 2. A drought management system based on risk/vulnerability assessment and preparedness response for the basin; 3. A socio-economic livelihood programme with viable and sustainable alternatives to current agricultural activities upstream of the lake to reduce water consumption significantly while maintaining the income and livelihood of affected communities; 4. An integrated watershed management (WM) programme; A capacity development programme to strengthen stakeholders at different levels.

The Silveh Dam in Piranshahr County should be complete in 2015. Through a tunnel and canals it will transfer up to 121,700,000 m^{3} (98,700 acre⋅ft) of water annually from the Lavin River in the Little Zab basin to Lake Urmia basin.

In 2015, president Hassan Rouhani's cabinet approved $660 million for improving irrigation systems, and steps to combat desertification.

In September 2018, A working group tasked with reviving Lake Urmia has started to grow two types of plants to save the region from salt particles. The two plants are Nitraria or Karadagh and Tamarix or Shoorgaz, which are planted on the land of Jabal Kandi village in Urmia County, to slow down the wind that brings with itself the salt particles.

By the end of the summer of 2025, the lake had completely disappeared according to NASA images.

=== Environmental protests ===
The prospect that Lake Urmia might dry up entirely has drawn protests in Iran and abroad, directed at both the regional and national governments. Protests flared in late August 2011 after the Iranian parliament voted not to provide funds to channel water from the Aras River to raise the lake level. Apparently, parliament proposed instead to relocate people living around Urmia Lake.

More than 30 activists were detained on 24 August 2011 during an iftar meal. In the absence of a right to protest publicly in Iran, protesters have incorporated their messages into chants at football matches. On 25 August, several soccer fans were detained before and after the Tabriz derby match between Tractor Sazi F.C. and Shahrdari Tabriz F.C. for shouting slogans in favor of protecting the lake, including "Urmia Lake is dying, the Majlis [parliament] orders its execution".

Further demonstrations took place in the streets of Tabriz and Urmia on 27 August and 3 September 2011. Amateur video from these events showed riot police on motorcycles attacking apparently peaceful protesters. According to the governor of West Azerbaijan, at least 60 supporters of the lake were arrested in Urmia, and dozens in Tabriz, because they had not applied for a permit to organize a demonstration.

The effect of climate change on the lake, has been extensively covered by an Iranian photojournalist Solmaz Daryani.

== Islands ==
Lake Urmia had approximately 102 islands. Shahi Island was historically the lake's largest. However, it became a peninsula connected to the eastern shore when the lake level dropped.

Shahi Island is the burial place of both Hulagu Khan (one of Genghis Khan's grandsons) and of Hulagu's son Abaqa. Both khans were buried in a castle above 1,000-foot (300 m) cliffs along the shore of the island.

== Basin rivers ==
Lake Urmia is fed by 13 permanent rivers and many small springs, as well as rainfall directly into the lake. Nearly half the inflow comes from the Zarrineh River and Simineh River. There is no outflow from the lake so water is only lost through evaporation.

- Aji Chay
- Alamlou River
- Barandouz River
- Gadar River
- Ghaie River
- Leylan River
- Mahabad River
- Nazlou River
- Rozeh River
- Shahar River
- Simineh River
- Zarrineh River
- Zola River

== In popular culture ==
Lake Urmia was the setting of the Iranian film The White Meadows (2009).

== Urmia Lake Research Programme ==
Urmia Lake Restoration Program (ULRP) is run by Sharif University of Technology with the following goals:

- Documenting the experiences and lessons learned from the cooperation of the academic community in various stages of studying and implementing solutions to a national environmental challenge in the country.

== Gallery ==
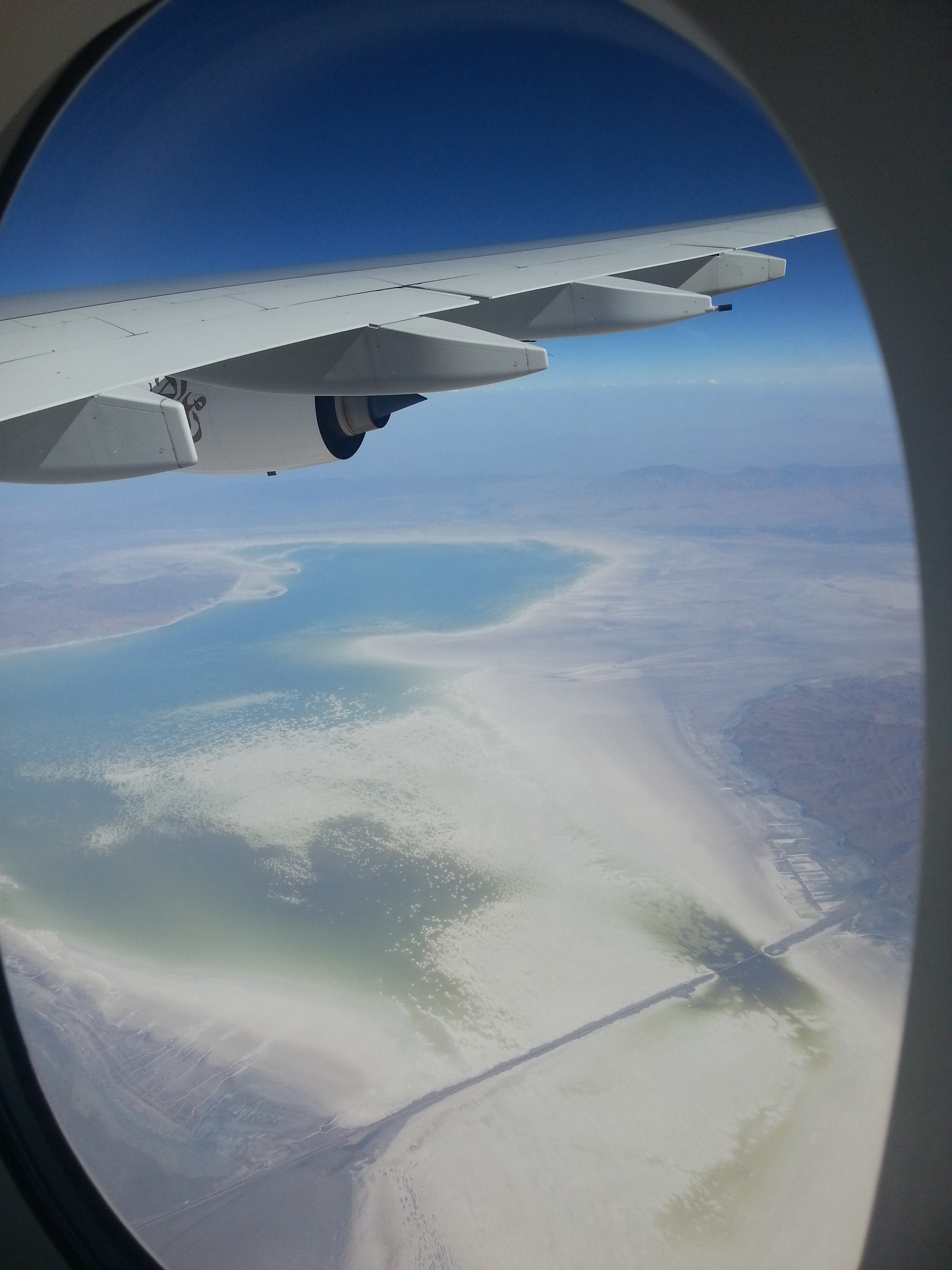
Lake Urmia, NW Iran, September 2015

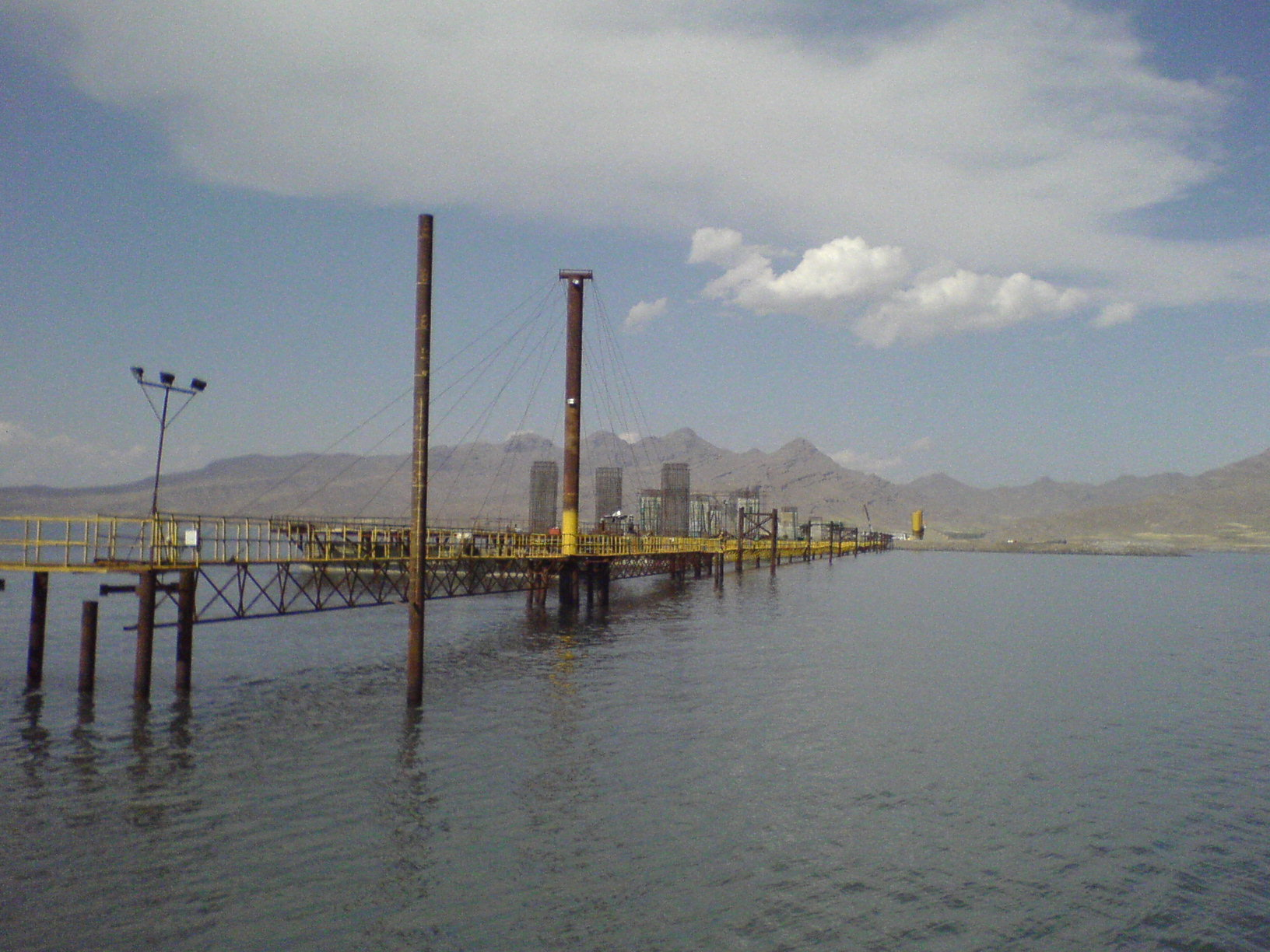
Bridge construction over Lake Urmia in 2005

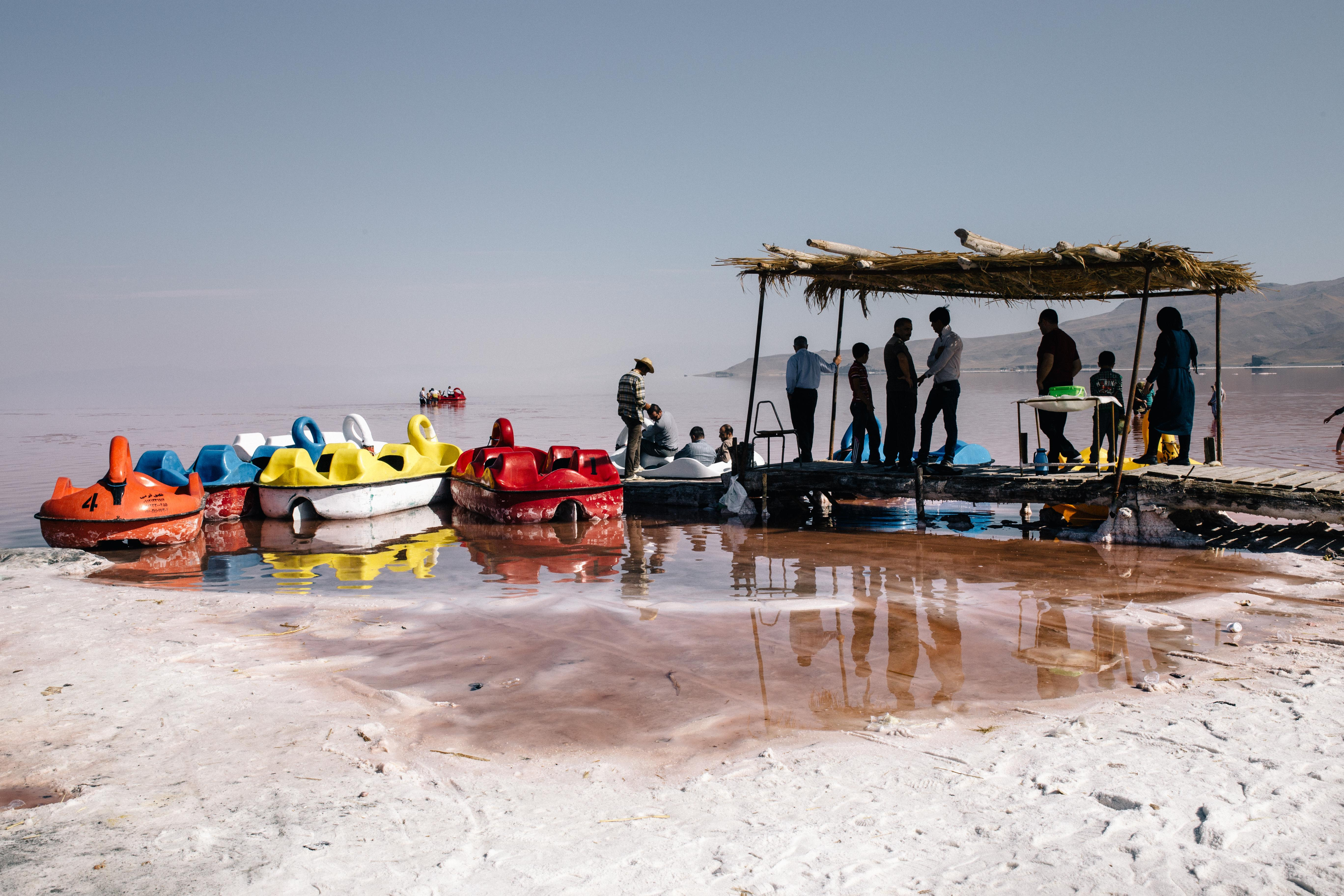
Lake Urmia around the "Shahid Kalantari" highway

== See also ==
- Ark of Nuh or Noah
- Urmia Lake Bridge
- List of drying lakes
- Mount Judi
