= Geoy Tepe =

Archaeological site in West Azarbaijan Province, Iran

Geoy Tepe گوی‌تپه

- Location within Iran
- 37.518°N 45.145°E
- Type: tell
- Periods: Early Bronze Age
- Location: Iran
- Region: West Azerbaijan province

History
- Abandoned: 1200 BC

Iran National Heritage List
- Official name: Geoy Tepe
- Type: Mound
- Designated: 1963
- Reference no.: 425
- Conservation organization: Cultural Heritage, Handicrafts and Tourism Organization of Iran

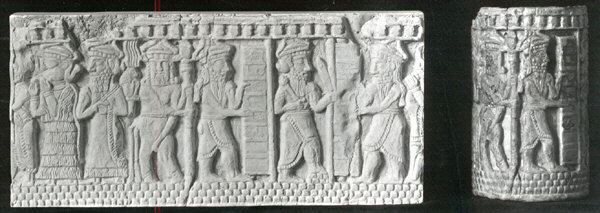
Cylinder with a ritual scene, early 2nd millennium B.C., Geoy Tepe, Iran

Geoy Tepe (also Gök Tepe) is an archaeological site in northwestern Iran, about seven kilometers south of Urmia (Reżāʾīya), Gug Tappeh. It was found by an aerial survey of ancient sites in Persia done by Erich Schmidt in the 1930s.

The site's mound is 80 feet (24 m) tall and is situated by a natural spring. T. Burton Brown of Great Britain excavated the site in August 1948. It was found to have been continuously occupied from the 4th millennium BCE until 1200 BCE.

Remains of the earliest stage of the Kura–Araxes culture have been found here.

== See also ==
- Kul Tepe Jolfa
- Teppe Hasanlu
- Hajji Firuz Tepe
