= Yanik Tepe =

Archaeological site in the East Azarbaijan region, Iran

- یانیق تپه (Persian)
- قره تپه
- Type: Tell
- Periods: Chalcolithic, Bronze Age
- Location: Tazeh Kand
- Region: Khosrowshah District; East Azerbaijan province

History
- Built: ca. 4,000–3,000 BC

Site notes
- Excavation dates: 1958–1959
- Archaeologists: Charles A. Burney
- Condition: Iran National registration number: 4170

Yanik Tepe (Persian: یانیق تپه) is a Chalcolithic and Bronze Age archaeological site in East Azerbaijan province, Iran.

== Site description ==
The site is located in Tabriz, Iran, east of Lake Urmia and about 30 kilometers southwest of the city of Tabriz.

Yanik Tepe is a relatively large tell (8 hectares) that rises 16.6 meters above the surrounding plain. It is one of the main protohistoric sites excavated in the region after the Second World War, along with Geoy Tepe and Haftavan Tepe. Excavations at Yanik Tepe were conducted by Charles A. Burney from 1960 to 1962. His excavations revealed a sequence spanning the Chalcolithic (4th millennium BC) to the Early Bronze Age (3rd millennium BC).

The Early Transcaucasian II–III (Kura–Araxes) culture flourished around the northern half of the Lake Urmia basin during the 3rd millennium BC. Yanik Tepe is one of the sites that yield clear evidence for this culture.

== Bone object ==
A bone object found in the Bronze Age layers of the site was originally interpreted by Burney as an amulet. In 2011, ophthalmologist Sahihi Oskooei claimed that it was instead the world's oldest eyewear, made to correct optical problems. Similar objects have been found in excavations at Çatalhöyük, where they may have been used as belt hooks.

== Proto-writing ==
At Yanik Tepe, a vessel was discovered bearing a distinctive ornament composed of incised signs that may be classified as proto-writing. Charles Burney suggested that these signs reflect an attempt by local tribes to create their own writing system. According to Burney, a script was in use among the local population of the Iranian Plateau in the 3rd millennium BCE; its signs survived in the decoration of local pottery from Period I of the Early Bronze Age, and this script was not similar to Proto-Elamite.
