= Boyuk Chay =

River in Iran

The Boyuk Chay River (In Persian: بویوک چای) is a river in northwest Iran.

The river is at 37°58'0"N and 47°45'0"E between Sarab and Ardabil, near Kalian, has an elevation of 1475meters and flows into Lake Urmia via Aji Chay River.

The area has a cold semi-arid (climate).
