= Hajji Firuz Tepe =

Archaeological site in West Azarbaijan Province, Iran

- Location within Near East Location within Iran
- 36.9944°N 45.4744°E
- Type: Tell
- Periods: Neolithic, Chalcolithic, Late Bronze Age/Iron Age, Islamic
- Location: Iran
- Region: West Azarbaijan province

Site notes
- Height: 10.3 metres (34 ft)
- Length: 200 metres (660 ft)
- Width: 140 metres (460 ft)
- Excavation dates: 1936, 1958, 1960, 1961, 1968
- Archaeologists: A. Stein, C. Burney, T. Cuyler Young Jr., R.H. Dyson, Mary M. Voigt

Hajji Firuz Tepe is an archaeological site located in West Azarbaijan Province in north-western Iran and lies in the north-western part of the Zagros Mountains. The site was excavated between 1958 and 1968 by archaeologists from the University of Pennsylvania Museum of Archaeology and Anthropology. The excavations revealed a Neolithic village that was occupied in the second half of the sixth millennium BC where some of the oldest archaeological evidence of grape-based wine was discovered in the form of organic residue in a pottery jar.

== History of research ==
Hajji Firuz Tepe was first noted in 1936 by Sir Aurel Stein, who collected pottery sherds from the surface of the site. The site was more thoroughly investigated between 1958 and 1968, when four excavation seasons took place as part of the larger Hasanlu Project conducted by the University of Pennsylvania Museum of Archaeology and Anthropology. The site was originally selected in order to investigate the early periods that had been attested in the occupation sequence of nearby Hasanlu. These excavations were supervised by Charles Burney (1958, 1961), T. Cuyler Young Jr. (1961) and Robert H. Dyson and Mary M. Voigt (1968). During these seasons, excavation squares were opened in four different parts of the site, with the largest exposure being reached on the north-eastern slope of the mound.

== The site and its environment ==
Hajji Firuz Tepe lies in the Gadar River valley in West Azarbaijan province, north-western Iran. It is a tell, or settlement mound, of roughly oval shape measuring 200 by 140 metres (660 by 460 ft) at its base and reaching an elevation of 10.3 metres (34 ft) above the plain, but archaeological deposits also continue to an unknown depth below the modern surface of the plain. The plain in which Hajji Firuz Tepe is located lies in the north-western part of the Zagros Mountains at an elevation of 1,300–1,350 metres (4,270–4,430 ft) amsl. The Gadar River flows through it toward the east to eventually end in marshes bordering Lake Urmia. The area is an important crossroads, with routes leading in all directions, including an easy route toward the west, crossing the Zagros Mountains via Rowanduz and Arbil toward the Mesopotamian Plains. The Gadar River valley falls within both the modern and ancient distribution zones of the wild grape (Vitis vinifera subsp. sylvestris) and of the terebinth.

== Occupation history ==
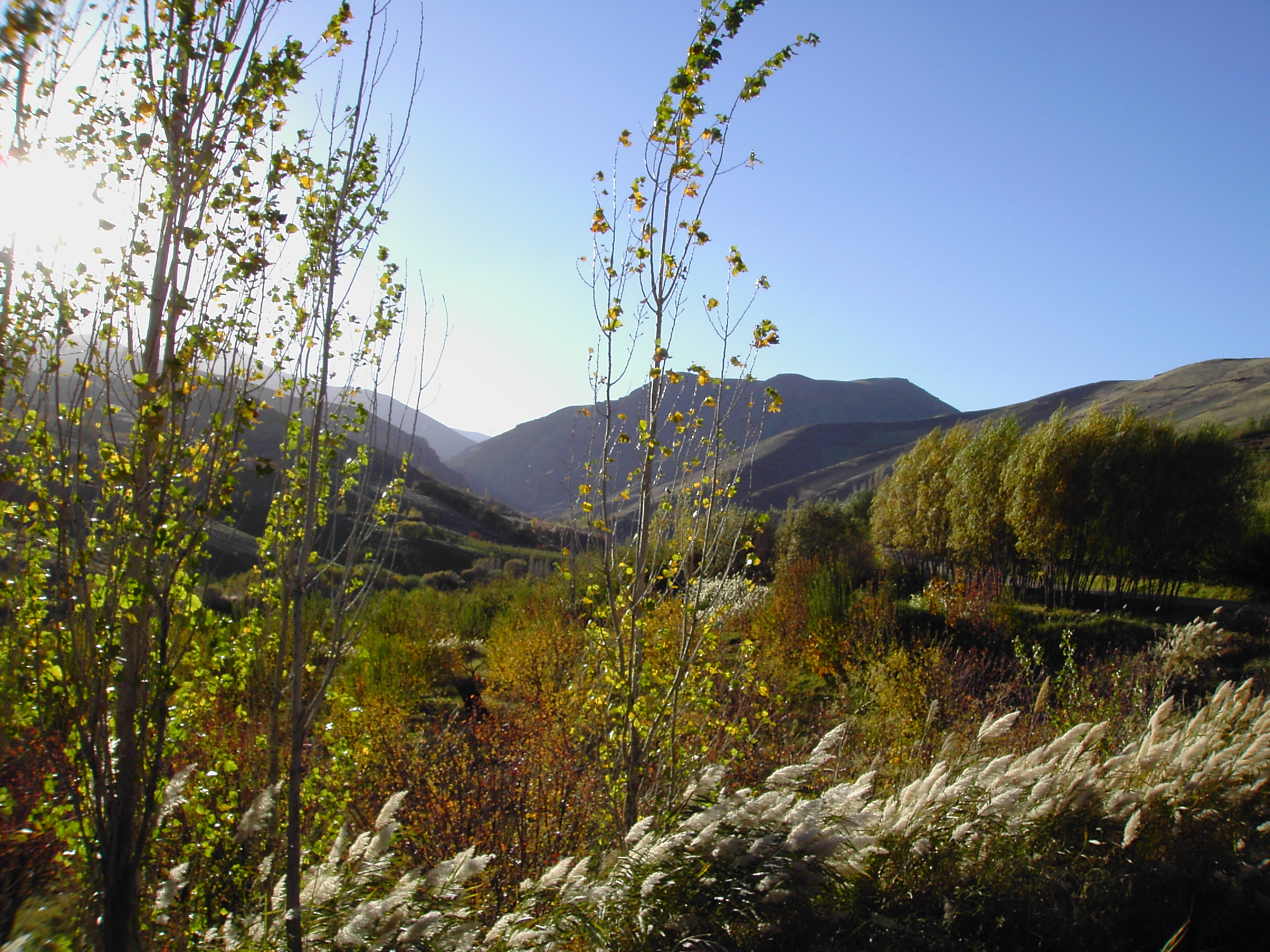
View of the Zagros Mountains

Although the excavations focused primarily on the Neolithic occupation layers of the site, evidence for later occupation was also attested. On different parts of the tell, material from the Chalcolithic, Late Bronze Age/Iron Age and Islamic (eleventh century AD) periods was recovered, although the Neolithic occupation seems to have been the most significant occupation. The Neolithic occupation has been divided in 12 phases, named A–L from latest to earliest.

=== Hajji Firuz period ===
Recent studies indicate that the Hajji Firuz period in northwest Iran can be dated c. 6000–5400 cal BC. Then, there was a short gap in chronology, or perhaps a transitional period.

The Dalma tradition then emerged; new radiocarbon dates for this tradition are c. 5000–4500 cal BC. Dalma seems like the result of a long local sequence of development from the Hajji Firuz period.

== Evidence for winemaking ==
The evidence for winemaking consisted of six 9-litre (2.4 US gal) jars that were embedded in the floor of what archeologists suspect was a kitchen area in a mudbrick building that was inhabited some time between 5400–5000 BC. Inside was yellowish deposits that chemical analysis showed contained residue of tartaric acid and calcium tartrate. Additionally, analysis found deposit of resin, identified as from the terebinth tree (Pistacia terebinthus) that grew wild in the area. It is possible that the resin was used as a preservative, in a manner similar to the Greek wine Retsina still being produced today, suggesting that winemaking in Hajji Firuz Tepe was deliberately taking place over 7,000 years ago.

=== Implications of the discovery ===
While the residue in the jar is not definitive proof of winemaking, it does provide strong evidence for the possibility. Grapes are unique in being one of the few natural sources for tartaric acid, which is the most abundant acid in wine and often crystallises into deposits that are left in containers that have held wine. Grapes also have a natural propensity to break down into alcohol by a process that we now know as fermentation where the yeast on the grape skins metabolise the sugar in the grapes into alcohol. This happens most readily in a closed container that is kept at room temperature. Whether or not the action was deliberate, storing grapes in jars that were then embedded in the floor would have created conditions favourable for wine production.

The presence of the terebinth resin deposits in the same container as the wine give a stronger indication that winemaking was perhaps deliberate in Hajji Firuz Tepe. Resin has had a long history of being used as ancient sealant and preservative, even before it became associated with winemaking by the ancient Greeks. The volume that was stored (54 litres (14 US gal)) also seems to indicate large scale production beyond just household storage of a food product for sustenance. Additionally, archaeologists found clay stoppers, corresponding in size to the opening of the jars, nearby that also suggest a deliberate attempt at long term preservation and protection from air exposure.

=== Other discoveries ===
The Zagros Mountains, which separate modern day Iran from Armenia, Iraq and Turkey, is home to many wild species of grapevines in the Vitis family. While wild vines are distinguished by separate male and female vines, the potential for pollination and the production of grapes could have easily happened, providing the inhabitants access to grapes. Several archaeological sites in the Zagros Mountains have uncovered similar findings as Hajji Firuz Tepe of jars containing tartaric deposits and wine residues. South of Hajji Firuz Tepe is Godin Tepe, a site that appears to have been inhabited just after the neolithic period (around 3500–3000 BC). Archaeologists there have discovered even more evidence of large scale winemaking with 30-litre (7.9 US gal) and 60-litre (16 US gal) wine jars as well as large basins containing wine residue, indicating that they might have been used for treading grapes as an early wine press. The residue on the jars was also found on the side of the containers, rather than the bottom, indicating that these jars were kept on their side, most likely for long term storage.

== See also ==
- History of wine
- Persian wine
- Cities of the ancient Near East
