= Golden bowl of Hasanlu =

Gold cup from Iran (c. 800 BC)

Golden cup of Hasanlu
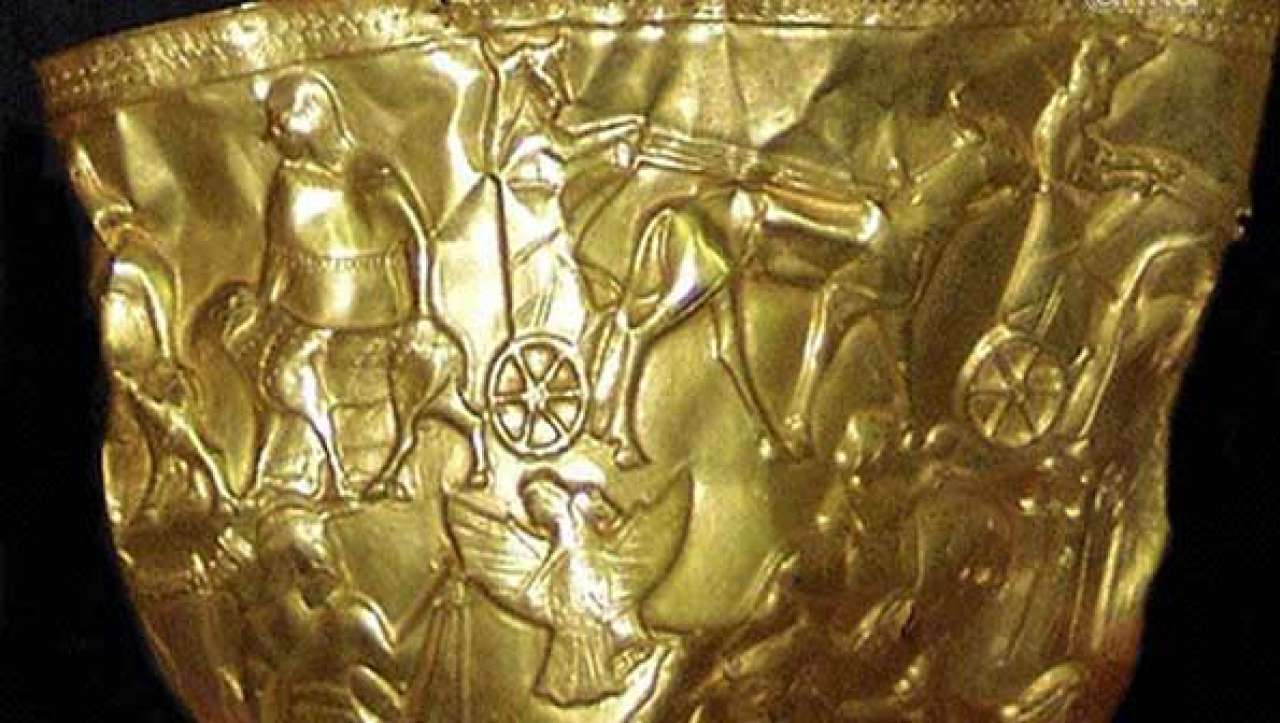
- Material: gold
- Size: height:21 cm diameter:21 cm
- Created: 800BC
- Period/culture: civilization before Medes
- Discovered: 1958
- Place: Teppeh Hasanlu, Iran; excavation directed by Robert H. Dyson, bowl reportedly unearthed by Emamqoli Mohammadi Hasanluei
- Present location: National Museum of Iran

The Golden bowl of Hasanlu (Persian: جام طلای حسنلو) is an ancient artefact, a cup or bowl in gold, decorated in relief, and now in the National Museum of Iran. It was discovered by Robert H. Dyson in 1958 while excavating the site of Teppeh Hasanlu, near the city of Naghadeh, in northwest Iran. According to some Iranian sources, Emamqoli Mohammadi Hasanluei was the local worker who physically unearthed the bowl during the excavation. The bowl is estimated to date from about 800 BC.

== Decoration ==
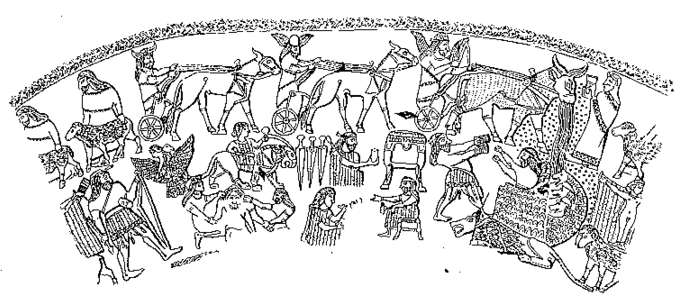
The reliefs around the bowl.

The reliefs show a complicated scheme with many figures, including several gods, various animals, sacrificing, and combat. It is mostly divided into two registers, with the gods, riding chariots and with winged heads, at the top. Assyriologist Stephanie Dalley has shown that each of the motifs can be related to an episode in the Epic of Gilgamesh. As the style of the decoration is not Mesopotamian and the episodes are not consistent with any single known version of the epic, she concludes that the epic had a wide circulation outside Mesopotamia.
