= Rudkhaneh-ye Mordaq =

River in Iran

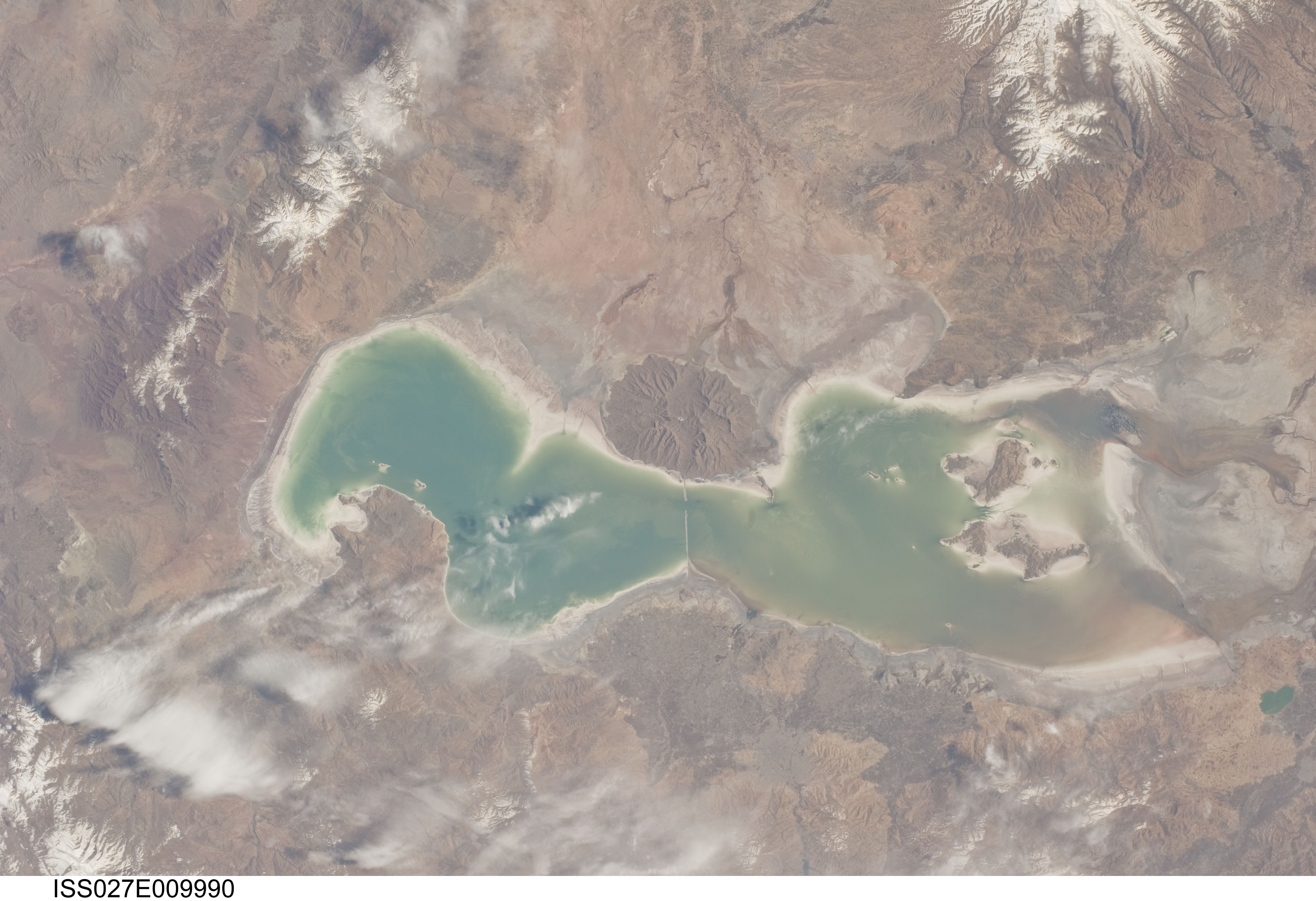
River at Right of picture

Rudkhaneh-ye Mordaq is a river in northwest Iran.

It is located at 37°8'24" N and 46°2'18" E in East Azerbaijan Province, Iran, near the town of Bonab, and flows into the southern end of Lake Urmia.

The Area has a cold semi-arid climate (Köppen climate classification BSk).
