= David Marshall Lang =

British historian (1924–1991)

David Marshall Lang (6 May 1924 – 20 March 1991), was a Professor of Caucasian Studies, School of Oriental and African Studies, University of London. He was one of the most productive British scholars who specialized in Georgian, Armenian and ancient Bulgarian history.

== Biography ==
Lang was born in Bromley and was educated at Monkton Combe School and St John’s College, Cambridge where he was a Major Scholar and later held a Fellowship. As a 20-year-old graduate, he was serving as an officer in Iran in 1944 when he was appointed as acting Vice-Consul in Tabriz, Iran. He met many of the city's Armenian people and leaders.

In 1949 he was a member of staff of the School of Oriental and African Studies at University of London. He began as lecturer in Georgian language, then as reader and in 1964 became professor of Caucasian studies. In 1953 he held a Senior Fellowship at the Russian Institute of Columbia University and in 1965 he was a visiting professor in Caucasian Studies at the University of California, Los Angeles. Between 1962 and 1964 he was honorary secretary of the Royal Asiatic Society of London.

Lang visited Soviet Armenia three times during the 1960s and 1970s. He visited the Soviet Union in December 1963 and was allegedly recruited at that time by the KGB, according to archivist Vasili Mitrokhin, who copied KGB files in Moscow. Mitrokhin also refers to Lang's career as an operative of English counter-intelligence. According to the dates in The Mitrokhin Archive, this would have taken place before Lang was 20 years old.

Historian Donald Rayfield alleged that Lang befriended Alexi Inauri, the head of the Georgian KGB. Inauri may have persuaded Lang to publicly denounce anti-Soviet dissidents in Georgia.

For a long time, Lang directed the Caucasian Studies Department at the University of London. He lectured in Caucasian languages and history at Cambridge and various universities around the world.

=== Armenia: Cradle of Civilization ===
His Armenia: Cradle of Civilization received mixed reviews. Avedis K. Sanjian wrote that its "purpose and scope are not specifically stated" and Lang "attempted to write about practically every aspect of Armenian history and civilization from prehistoric times to the present." It criticized the disproportionate focus on prehistoric Armenia, "occasional untenable conclusions, and frequent injection of irrelevancies and journalistic quotations. On the other hand, the author's deep enthusiasm for his subject, his great facility for condensing and popularizing scholarly research and his lucid style which borders on the romantic, will undoubtedly have a strong appeal to the non-specialist reader." Ronald Grigor Suny was more critical. He said that the book has nothing new to offer as a contribution to scholarship. He added: "Indeed, the frequently flamboyant prose, the nearly complete emphasis on political history and personalities, and the allusions to national characteristics give the text a distinctly old-fashioned quality." Suny argued that Lang overlooked historiographic disputes and controversial issues and did not attempt to analyze the "centrifugal forces operating in Armenian society (the naxarar system), the influence of geography, the effect of living between great and hostile empires to the east and west, or the weight of Islamic rule."

Sebastian Brock said it was "somewhat encyclopedic in character". He said the chapters concerning the Armenian Church "do little more than whet the appetite." A review in the Journal of the Royal Asiatic Society noted that it contains "so little social history", but suggested that it is "the most comprehensive history of Armenia and its culture published in English, and as such fills a definite need. The general reader will be grateful to Professor Lang for having written it."

== Selected bibliography ==
- The Wisdom of Balahvar (London: George Allen & Unwin Ltd, 1957)
- The Last Years of the Georgian Monarchy, 1658–1832 (New York: Columbia University Press, 1957)
- First Russian Radical, Alexander Radischev, 1749–1802 (London: George Allen & Unwin, 1959)
- A Modern History of Georgia (London: Weidenfeld and Nicolson, 1962)
- The Georgians (New York: Praeger, 1966)
- Armenia: Cradle of Civilization (London: George Allen & Unwin, 1970)
- The Peoples of the Hills: Ancient Ararat and Caucasus by Charles Allen Burney and D.M. Lang (London: Weidenfeld and Nicolson, 1971)
- Bulgarians: From Pagan Times to the Ottoman Conquest (London: Thames and Hudson, 1976)
- Lives and Legends of the Georgian Saints (New York: Crestwood, 1976)
- The Armenians: A People in Exile (London: Allen and Unwin, 1981)
- Armenia and Karabagh: the Struggle for Unity (London: Minority Rights Group, 1991)

== See also ==
- Kartvelian studies
