= Lorestani =

Lorestani is a surname. Notable people with the surname include:

- Aref Lorestani (1972–2017), Iranian actor
- Maziar Lorestani (born 1966), Iranian actor and director
