= Lake Tar =

Lake in Abarshiveh Rural District, Iran

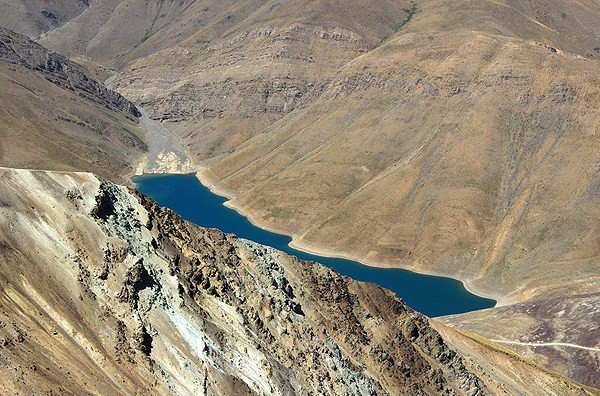
- Interactive map of Lake Tar
- Location: Abarshiveh Rural District, Iran
- Coordinates: 35°43′48″N 52°13′39″E
- Type: Lake
- Surface elevation: 3,000 metres (9,800 ft)
- Settlements: Damavand, Iran

Lake Tar (Persian: دریاچه تار) is a mountainous freshwater lake that is one of Iran's national natural areas and a tourist attraction in Damavand City, located to the east of the capital Tehran. It is surrounded by the Alborz mountain range. The altitude of the site exceeds 3,000 meters above sea level. The area of the lake is seven square kilometers. The lake is the subject of numerous historical accounts, including those of its purported magical properties and the existence of buried treasures.

== Composition ==
This lake, one of Iran's freshwater lakes, is situated between the mountains in the north and Zarinkuh in the south. It was formed by a landslide from Zarinkuh.

== Location ==
The geographical location of the lake is situated in a region encompassed by elevated mountainous terrain, with altitudes ranging from 50 to 500 meters above sea level. The lake is situated in the northern region of the city of Damavand, at an altitude of 3200 meters above sea level, situated between two mountain ranges: Qara Dagh in the north and Zarin in the south.

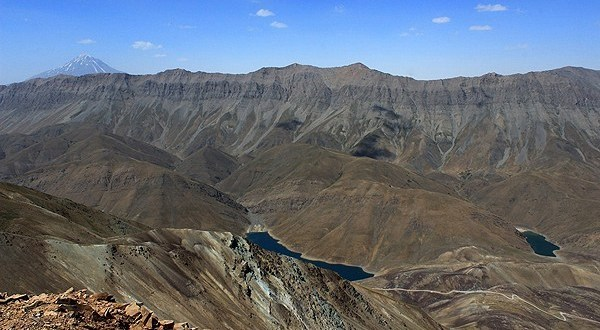
Aerial view of Lake Tar

== Routes ==
Two routes lead from the summit to the village of Hoyer. One route leads to Lake Tar, and the other leads to Lake Hoyer. The mountain roads to Hoyer are unpaved. It is recommended that large two-axle vehicles be used to traverse these roads. Lake Tar is larger than Lake Hoyer, with an area of seven square kilometers. Due to the high altitude of the two lakes, there is no vegetation present along their margins. The presence of red-spotted trout and other species of trout in these lakes renders the area conducive to angling for these fish.

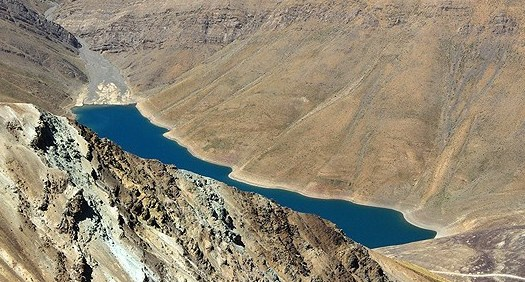
General view of Lake Tar

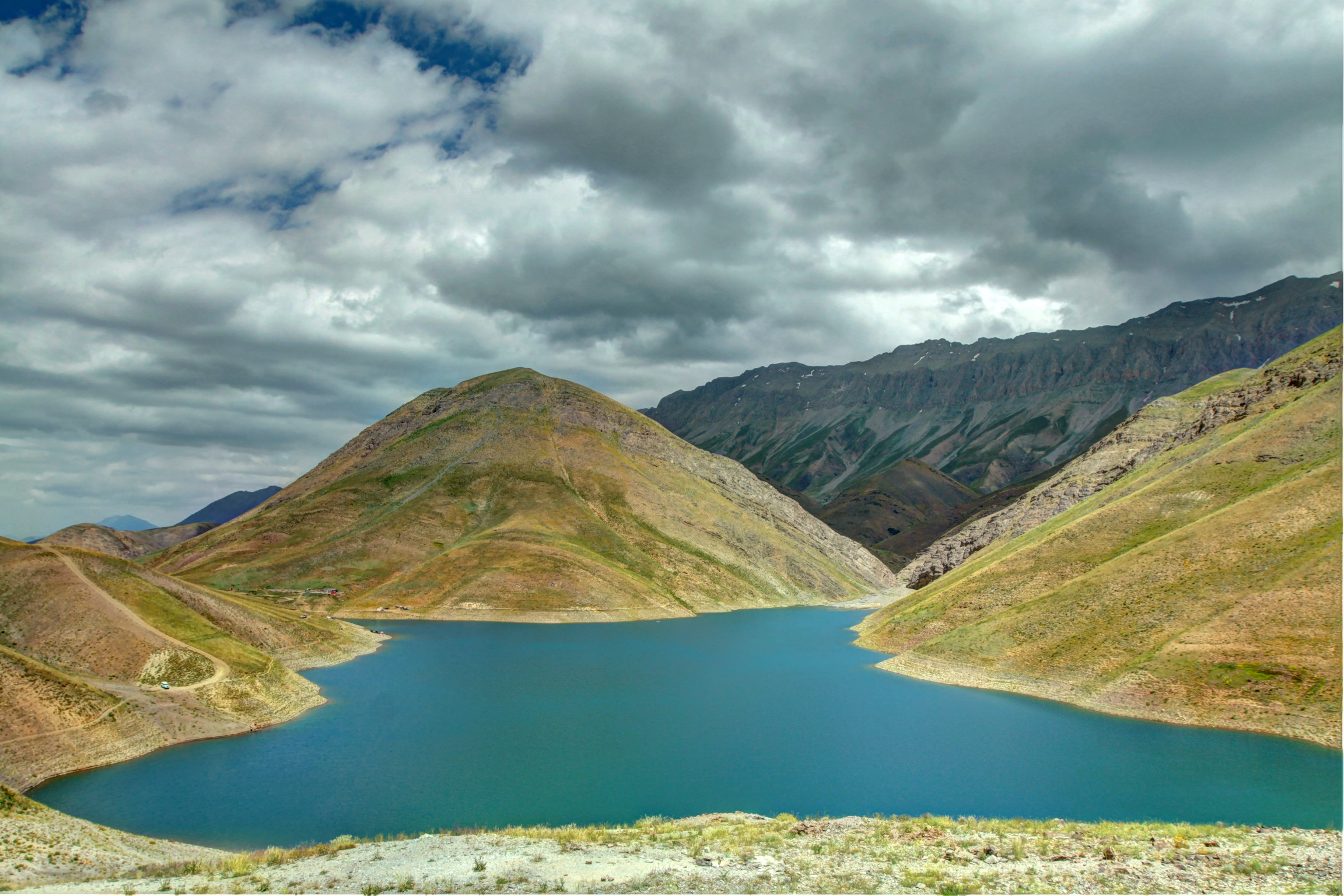
Tar Lake, Firuzkuh County

== Tourism ==
The lake is a popular tourist destination, offering a variety of natural attractions and a refreshingly clean environment. Its water, which originates from boiling springs, melting snow from surrounding mountains, and seasonal rivers, is a significant feature of the lake ecosystem. It is home to various fish species, including red-spotted trout, rainbow trout, and yellow fish. Many tourists visit the lake to catch these fish, specially in the spring season.

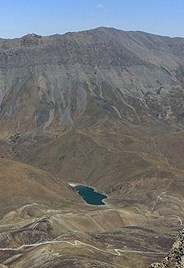
Lake Tar

== Source of the lake's water ==
The Karadagh Mountains are home to numerous boiling springs, which contribute to the formation of Lake Tar. Additionally, seasonal rivers and flows from the south, some of which flow into the lakes, feed the lake. The Tar and Huyar rivers are also fed by part of their tributaries. The flow of this lake represents a minor source of the Tar River, which is naturally fed by other rivers and flows into the city of Damavand.

== Environment ==
=== Climate ===
The lake's climate is characterized by low temperatures throughout the year, with winds from the west being a constant feature. The optimal time to visit the lake is during the early months of June.

=== Vegetation ===
The absence of trees and shrubs around the lake is a consequence of its high altitude. In the past, thyme plants were observed on some of the slopes.

=== Fish ===
In recent years, the Environment Bureau has released redfish and zebrafish into the lake. In addition to the salmon and trout species that are native to the lake.

=== Paths of entry ===
Damavand city, east of Chinar village, mining road.

The route from the village of Dalichay to the villages of Yeher, Momag, Dehnar, and Hoyer, and then to the small lake of Hoyer and Lake Tar, is accessible via the Damavand-Firozkoh road.

The third route begins at Hoyer Road and proceeds along the dirt road leading from the village of Sarpandan in the Zarinkuh Mountains.

== Gallery ==
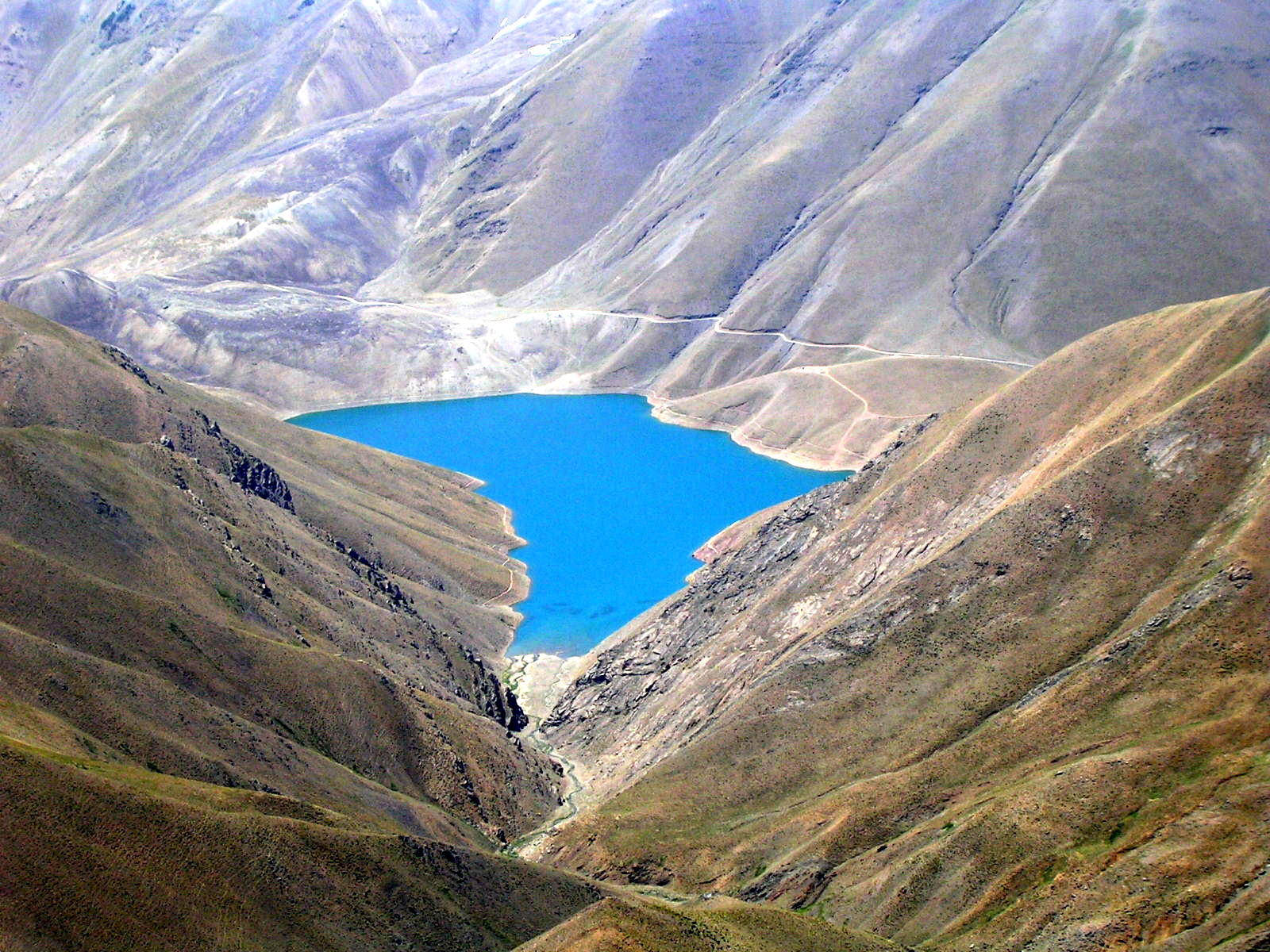
Tar Lake, Firuzkuh

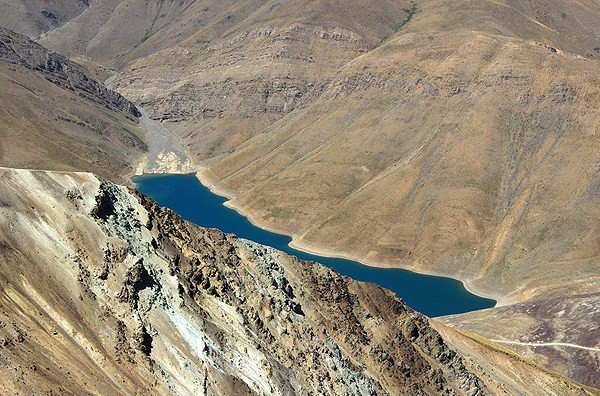
Tar Lake, Firuzkuh

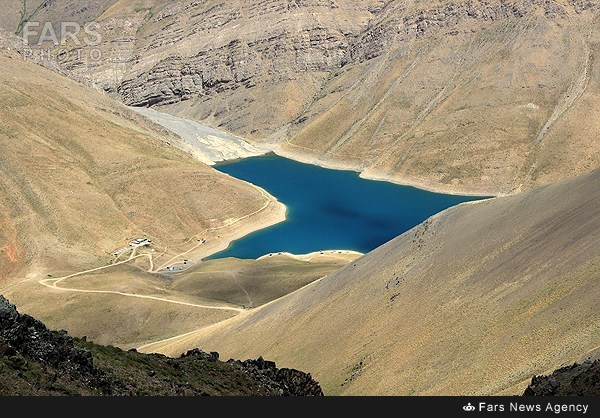
Tar Lake, Firuzkuh

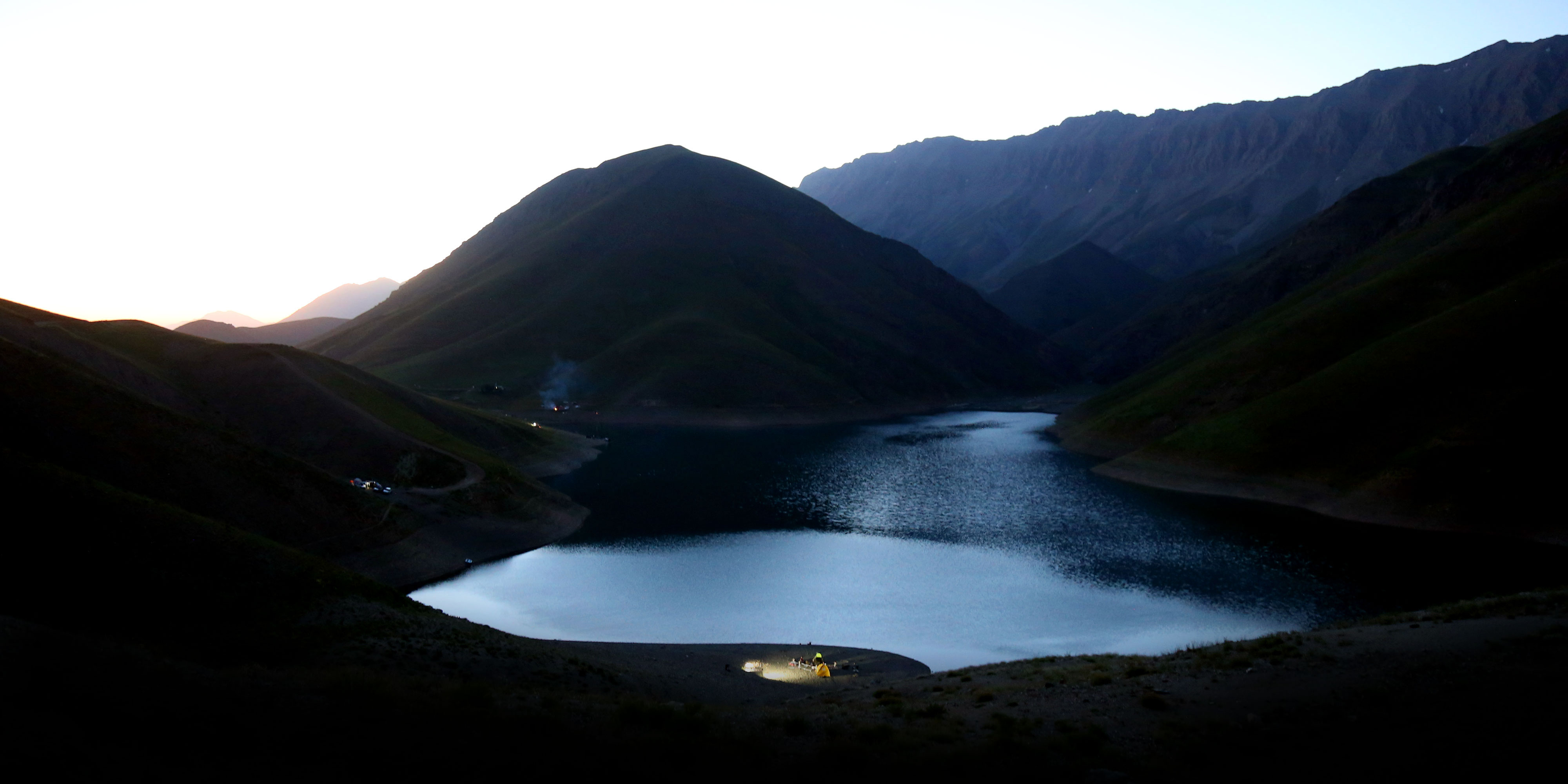
Tar Lake, Firuzkuh

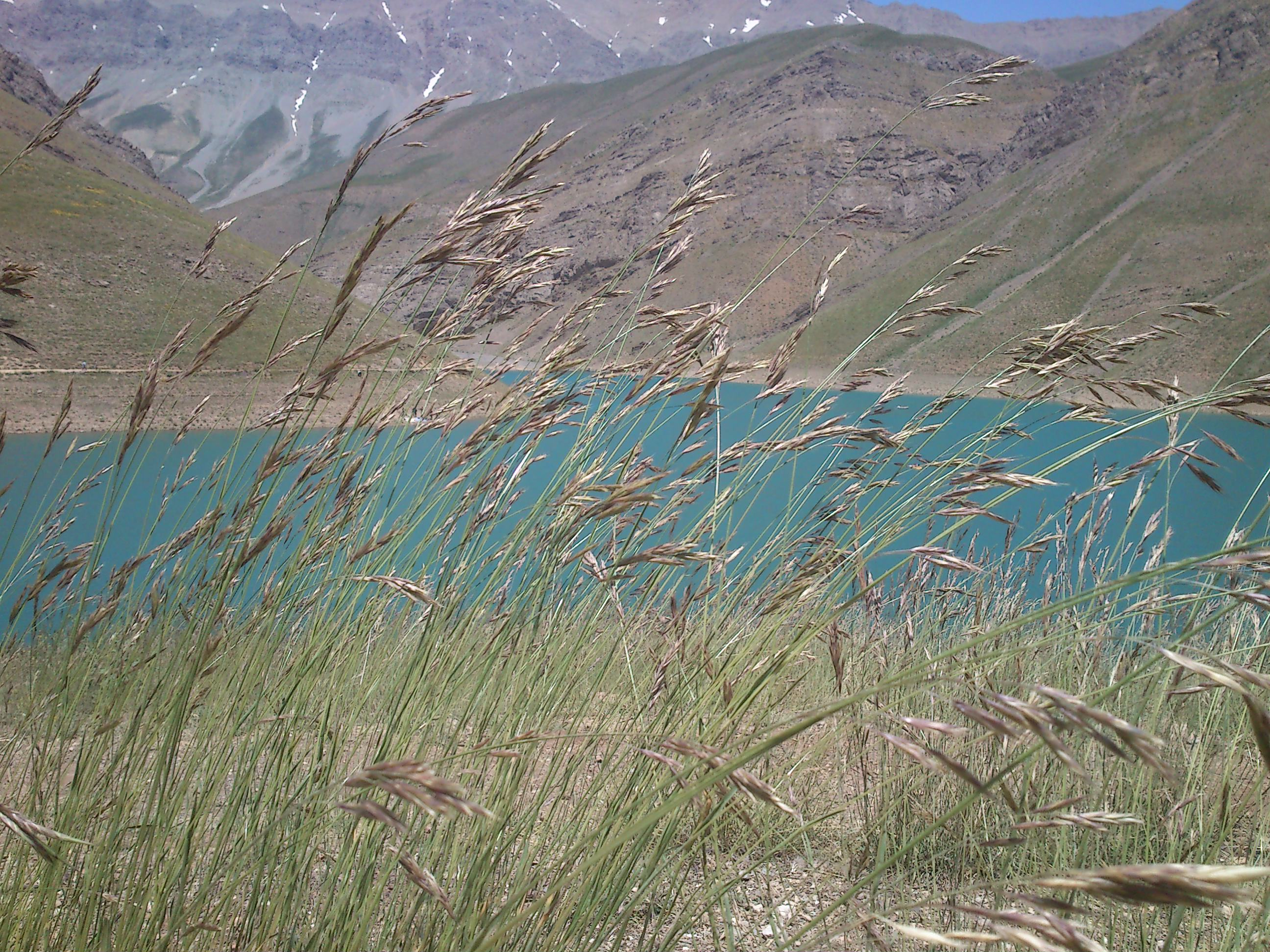
Tar Lake, Firuzkuh

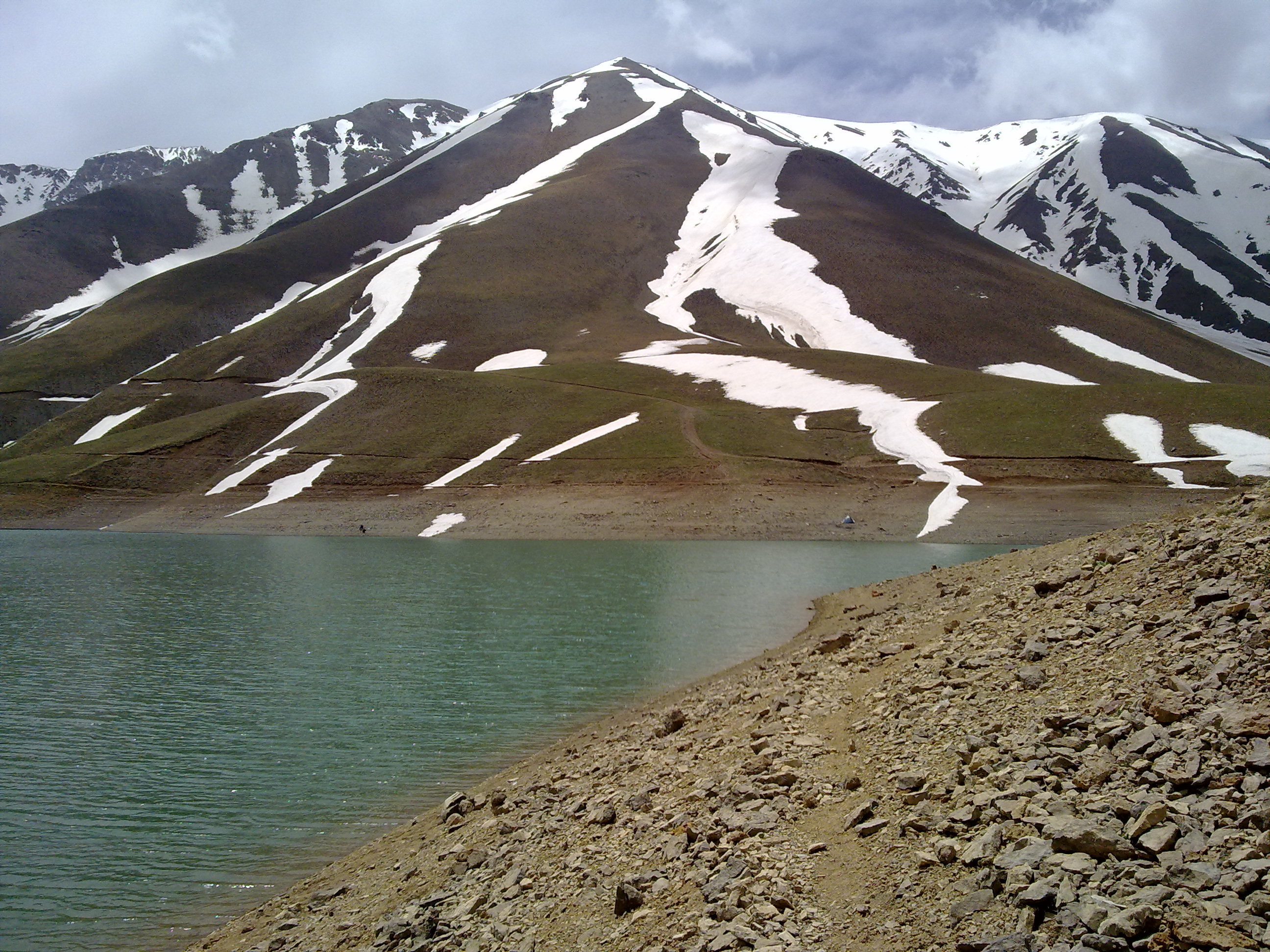
Tar Lake, Firuzkuh

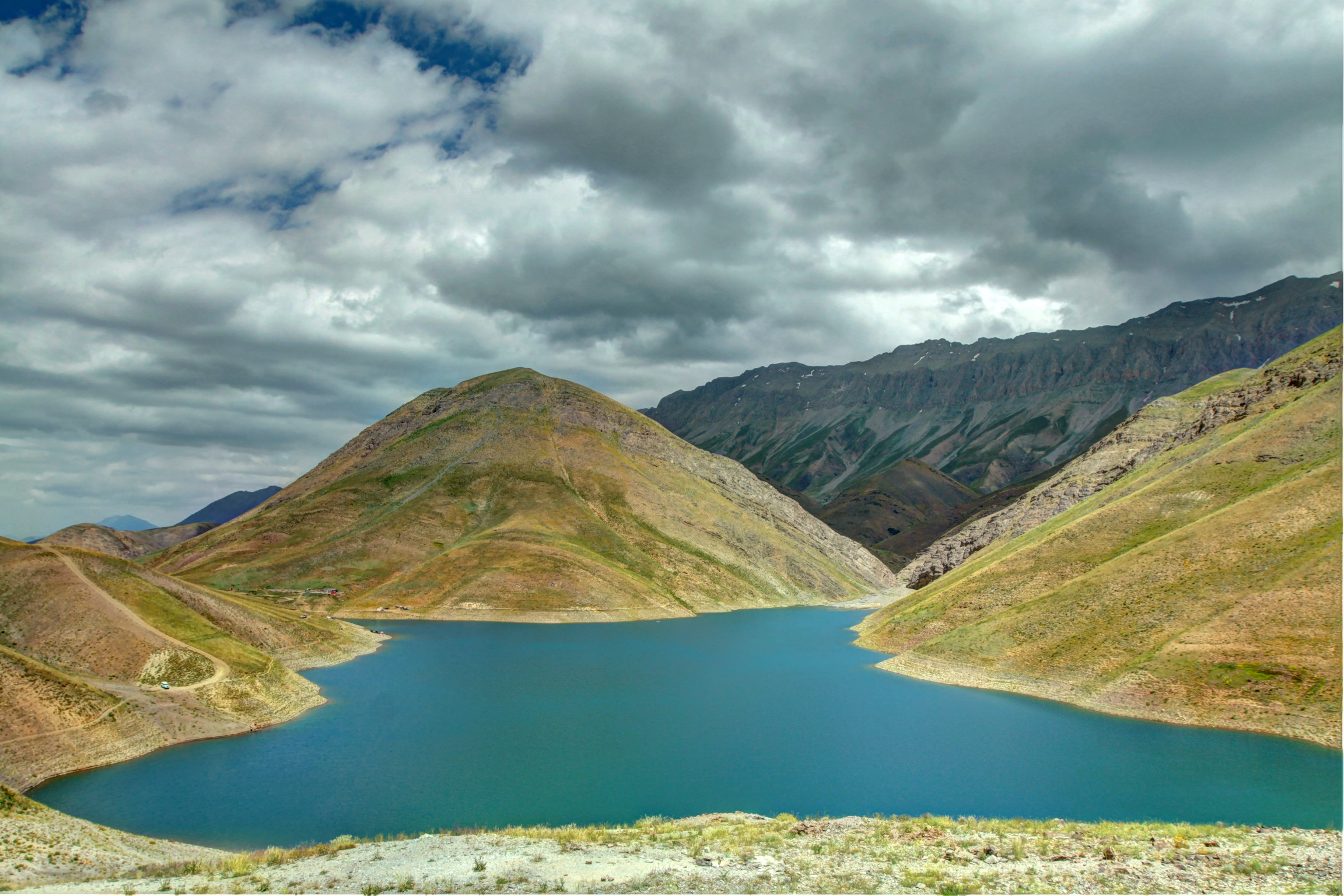
Tar Lake, Firuzkuh

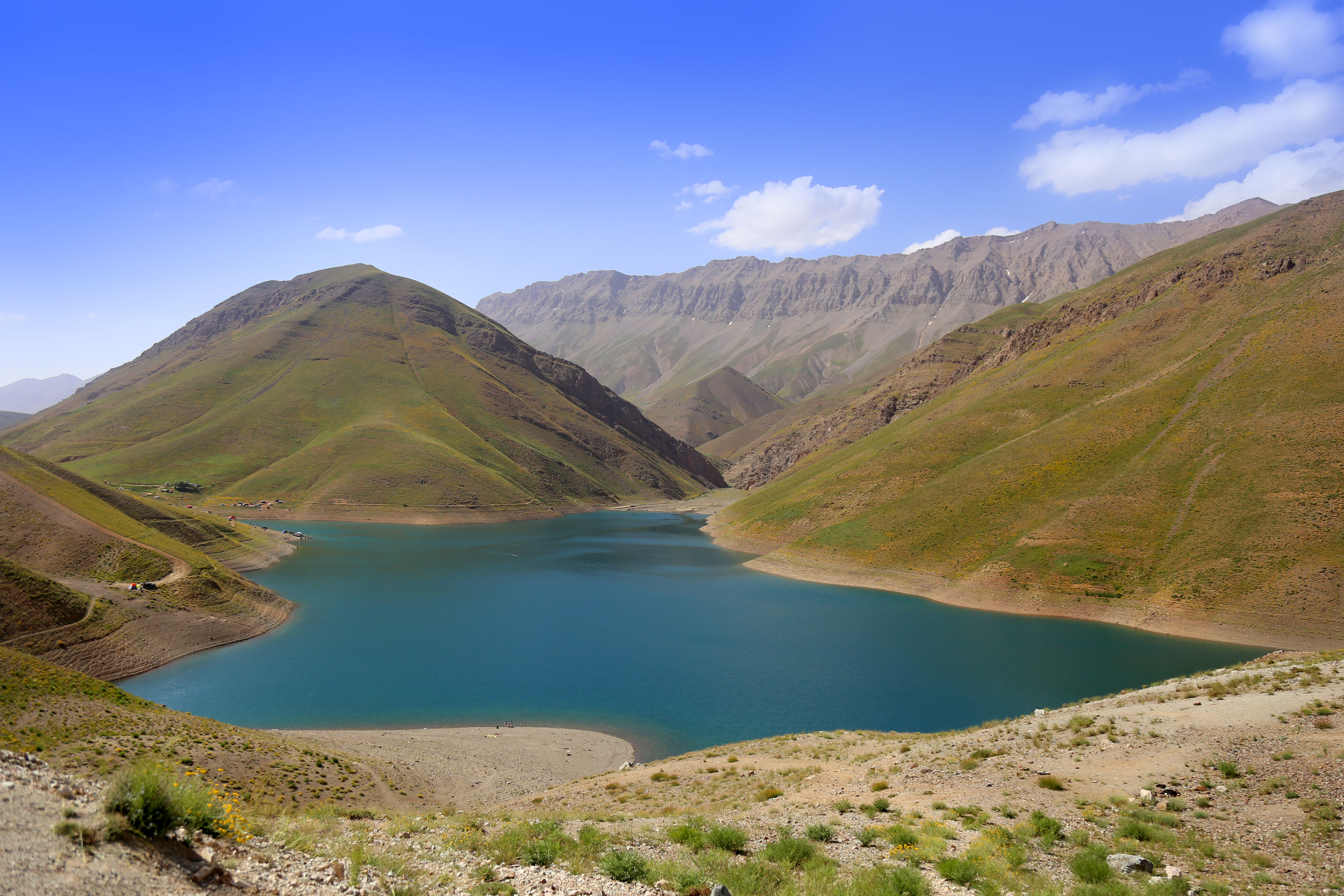
Tar Lake, Firuzkuh

== See also ==
- Cheshme Belghais Garden.
- National Botanical Garden of Iran.
- Ab-o-Atash Park.
- Dizin.
- Tochal Complex.
- Alvares (ski resort).
- Shemshak (ski resort).
- List of rivers of Iran.
