= Urmia Lake Bridge =

Urmia Lake Bridge پل دریاچه ارومیه)
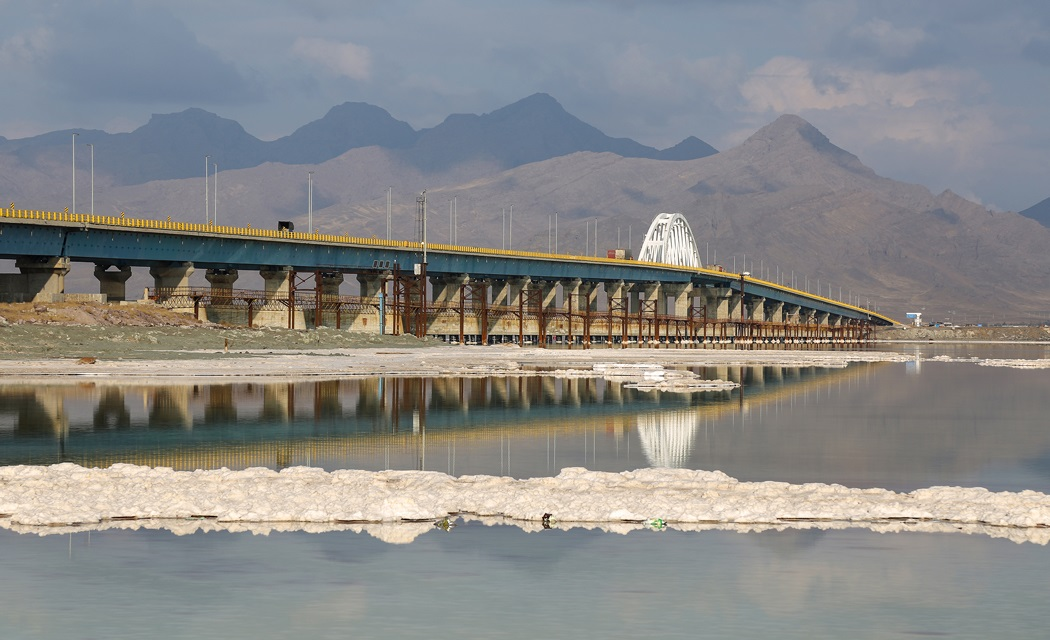
- Coordinates: 37°47′36″N 45°22′29″E
- Crosses: Lake Urmia
- Locale: East Azerbaijan and West Azerbaijan, Iran
- Official name: Shahid Kalantari Causeway

Characteristics
- Total length: 1,276 meters (4,186 ft)
- Longest span: 100 meters (330 ft)

History
- Opened: November 2008; 17 years ago

Location
- Interactive map of Urmia Lake Bridge پل دریاچه ارومیه)

The Urmia Lake Bridge (Persian: پل دریاچه ارومیه) or Shahid Kalantari Causeway (Persian: میان گذر شهید کلانتری) is a road bridge in northern Iran. It is the largest and longest bridge in Iran, and crosses Lake Urmia, connecting the provinces of East Azerbaijan and West Azerbaijan. The project was completed in November 2008 under the administration of Mahmoud Ahmadinejad.

== History ==
A project to build a highway across the lake was initiated in the 1970s but was abandoned after the Iranian Revolution of 1979, although a 15 km (9.3 mi) causeway with an unbridged gap had already been completed. The project was revived in the early 2000s, and was completed in November 2008 with the opening of the bridge across the remaining gap.

The bridge was planned for the length of 1,276 meters with 19 spans, comprising a central 100 meter main span and nine spans each side. The main span is in the form of an overhead tied arch and is 20.1 meters in height. It allows for shipping underneath.

The highly saline environment is already causing heavy rusting of the steel on the bridge, despite anti-corrosion treatment.

== Synthetic Aperture Radar imagery ==
Multisensor InSAR analysis from 4 different satellite sensors (i.e. Envisat, ALOS-1, TerraSAR-X and Sentinel-1) in a period of 13 years (2004-2017) revealed that a long-term consolidation on the causeway is present. The rate of consolidation (in satellite look direction) of the causeway peaked at 90 mm/year in 2012 and 2013. The soil consolidation of the causeway is not unusual, but if the settlement that has occurred since 2004 continues into the future, the causeway might be damaged by uneven settlement rates in the east and west embankments.

== Environmental impact ==
Environmentalists have warned that the construction of the causeway for the bridge, along with other ecological factors, will contribute to the drying up of Lake Urmia, turning it into an inland salt marsh, and adversely affecting the climate of the region. They state that the 1,276 metres (4,186 ft) gap in the causeway is not wide enough to permit adequate flow between the two portions of the lake. The presence of increased numbers of halobacteriaceae in the northern portion of the lake, amid red coloration of the lake, has been said to be indicative of the increasing salinity of the water.
