= Kaftar Ali Chay =

River in Iran

Kaftar Ali Chay is a river in northwest Iran, located at lat 38.24, long45.62e.

The river rises in the hills near Kandalaj, flows past the town of Daryan, in Shabestar County and empties into Lake Urmia. The river is around 1778m above sea level.
