= Shahar River =

River in the Zagros Mountains of northwestern Iran

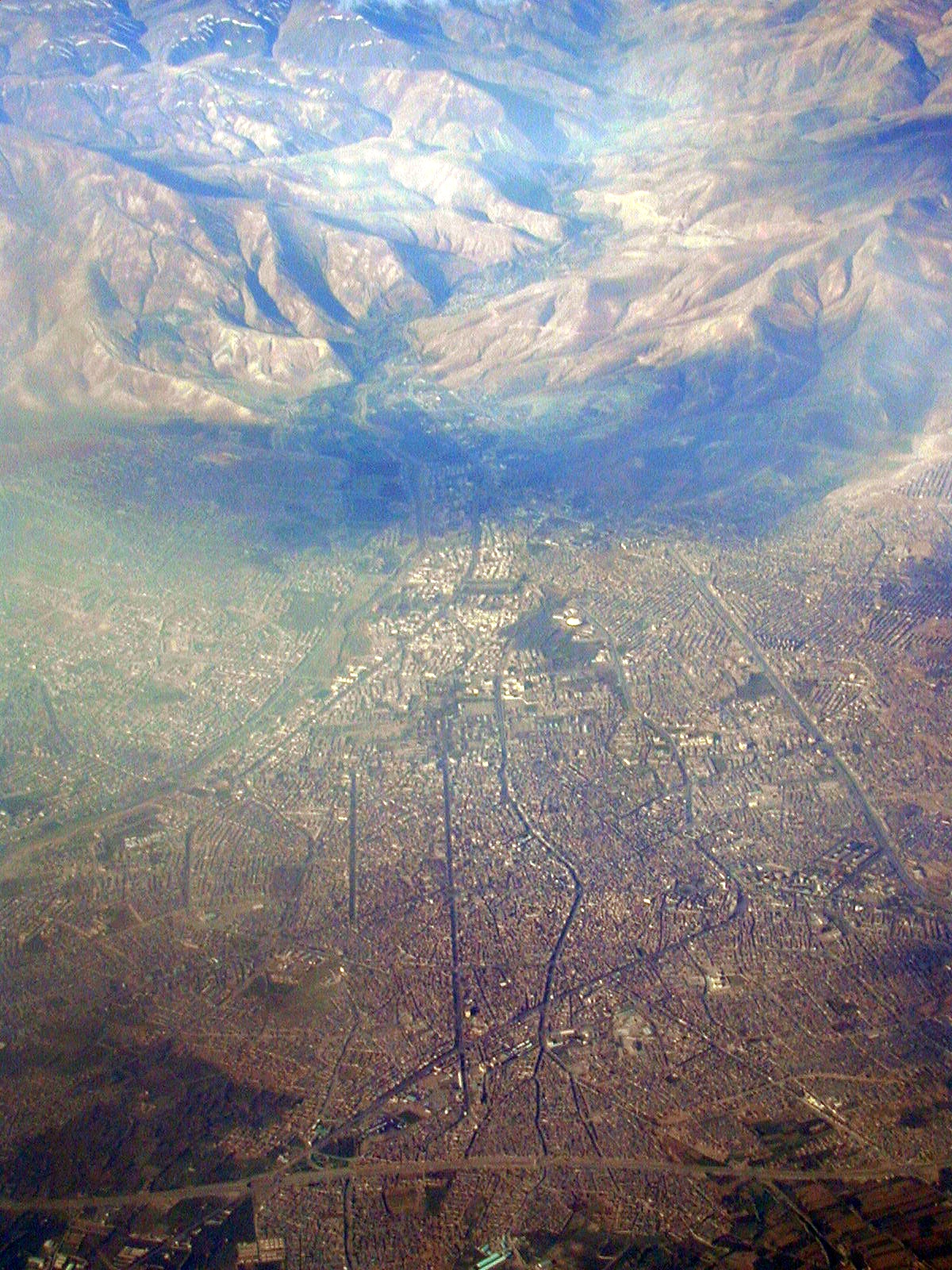
Shahar River flowing through Urmia City

The Shahar River, also known as Shahar Chay (City River) (Persian: شهرچایی, Kurdish: بەردە سوور, Azerbaijani: شهرچایی) is a river in the Zagros Mountains of northwestern Iran.

The river rises in the Zagros Mountains region along the Iran-Turkey border. It flows in an easterly direction through the city of Urmia and empties into Lake Urmia on its western shore, near Keshtiban.

The Shahar is impounded by Shaharchay Dam, located near Silvaneh and Rajan, Iran.
