= Alamlou River =

River in Iran

Alamlou River (Persian: رود الملو) is an endorheic river in northern Iran that flows into the south end of the saltwater Lake Urmia. It should not be confused with the Alamut River, a distinct Iranian river to the east.
