= Gadar River =

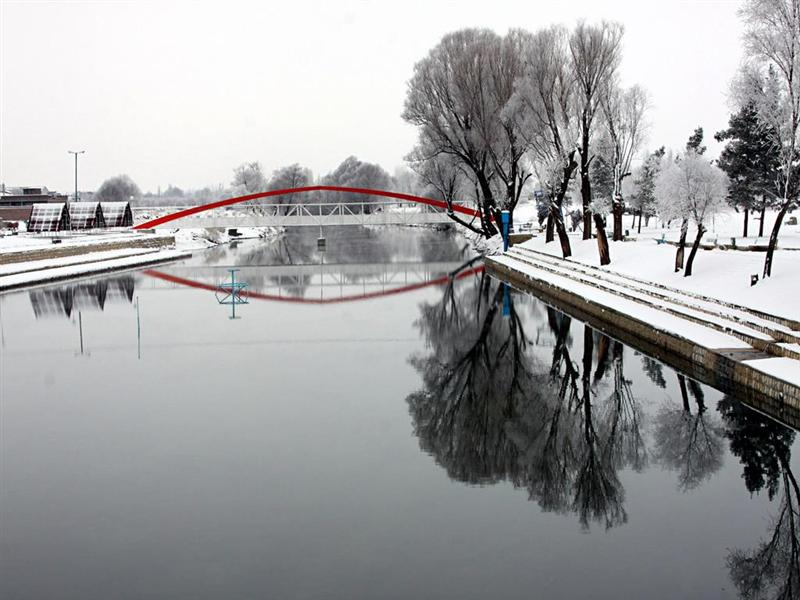

Location
- Country: Iran
- Province: West Azarbaijan province

Physical characteristics
- Mouth
  - location: Lake Urmia, Iran
- Length: 100 km (62 mi)
- Basin size: 2,000 km^{2} (770 sq mi)(approx.)
- Discharge
  - average: 0.34 m^{3}/s (12 cu ft/s)

The Gadar River rises in the Iranian Zagros Mountains close to where the borders of Iran, Turkey and Iraq meet. From its source, the river flows towards the southeast and then changes course due east through the Ushnu-Solduz valley. After leaving the valley, the river turns north and flows into the marshes bordering the endorheic saltwater Lake Urmia. The length of the river is approximately 100 kilometres (62 mi), its drainage basin is variously estimated as 1,900 square kilometres (730 sq mi) and 2,123 square kilometres (820 sq mi) and its discharge is 0.34 cubic metres (12 cu ft) per second. The Ushnu-Solduz valley has been occupied for many millennia, as testified by the excavations at sites like Hasanlu Tepe and Hajji Firuz Tepe.
