= Barandouz River =

River in north-west Iran

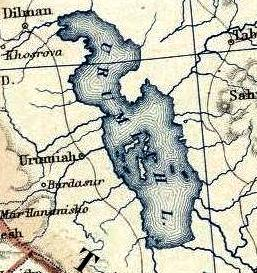
Lake Urmia showing Baranduz River.

The Baranduz River is located in north west Iran which flows into the endorheic saltwater Lake Urmia. It is named after the village of Baran Duz.

After the building of the Baranduz Dam, the flow of the river was greatly reduced, contributing to the severe desiccation of Lake Urmia.
