= Helleh River =

River in Iran

Catchment area of Helleh River (in deep blue)

Helleh River (Persian: رود حله) is formed by the confluence of the Shapur River and the Dalaki River which run from the Zagros Mountains. At the confluence, which is near the city of Bushehr, there are important wetlands for migrating birds. The Helleh River enters the Persian Gulf at the north end of Bushehr Bay where it forms a delta.
