= Simeneh-ye Olya =

Simeneh-ye Olya سيمينه عليا
- Village
- Location within Iran
- Coordinates: 34°20′24″N 46°53′32″E
- Country: Iran
- Province: Kermanshah
- County: Kermanshah
- Bakhsh: Mahidasht
- Rural District: Mahidasht

Population (2006)
  - Total: 299
- Time zone: UTC+3:30 (IRST)
  - Summer (DST): UTC+4:30 (IRDT)

Simeneh-ye Olya (Persian: سيمينه عليا, also Romanized as Sīmeneh-ye ‘Olyā; also known as Sīmīnāh, Sīmīneh, Sīmīneh-ye Bālā, and Sīmīneh-ye ‘Olyā) is a village in Mahidasht Rural District, Mahidasht District, Kermanshah County, Kermanshah Province, Iran. At the 2006 census, its population was 299, in 65 families.
