= Gabrik River =

River in Iran

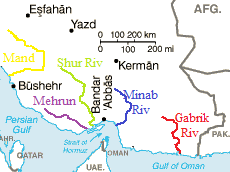
Map of rivers in South Iran

Gabrik River (Persian: رود گابریک) is a river in south eastern Iran that flows into the Gulf of Oman in Hormozgan.
