= Leylan River =

River in Iran

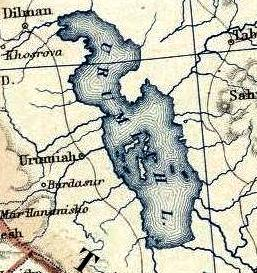
Map of endorheic Lake Urmia and its tributaries (1861).

The Laylan is an endorheic river in western Iran.

It originates in the Zagros Mountains within Mahabad County of West Azerbaijan Province, and flows into the endorheic Lake Urmia in East Azerbaijan Province.

== See also ==
- Zagros Mountains topics
