= Zola River =

Coordinates: 38.2108°N 45.0219°E

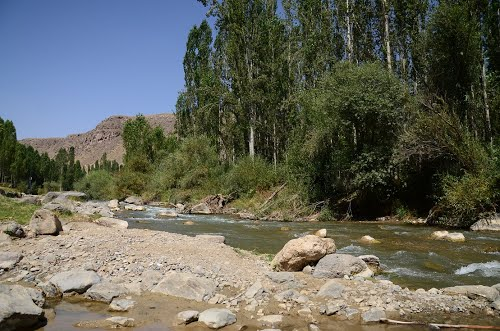

- Location within Iran

Location
- Country: Iran
- Province: West Azarbaijan province

Physical characteristics
- Mouth
  - location: Lake Urmia, Iran

The Zola River, also known as the Zola Chai, is a river in Iran, flowing into Lake Urmia. It runs north of Urmia and west of Salmas city in West Azerbaijan province. Rising in the mountains along the border with Turkey, the Zola flows southwest along the Salmas Plain. The river has a catchment area of 846 km².

== Zola Reservoir ==
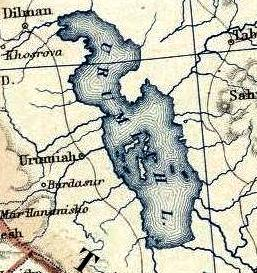
The Zola River near Korsova & Dilman

The river has also been dammed for irrigation. The dam has a height of 83m and a width of 287m and is constructed of an Earth-rock dam with central clay core. The dam holds 85 million m³ of water.

== Ecology ==
The Zola river is an important component of the ecosystem of the Lake Urmia Basin. Lake Urmia is drying out and has taken on a red color due to phytoplankton in recent years. The health of this river is a key indicator of the health of the whole basin and is therefore the subject of much study.
