= Nazlou River =

River in Iran

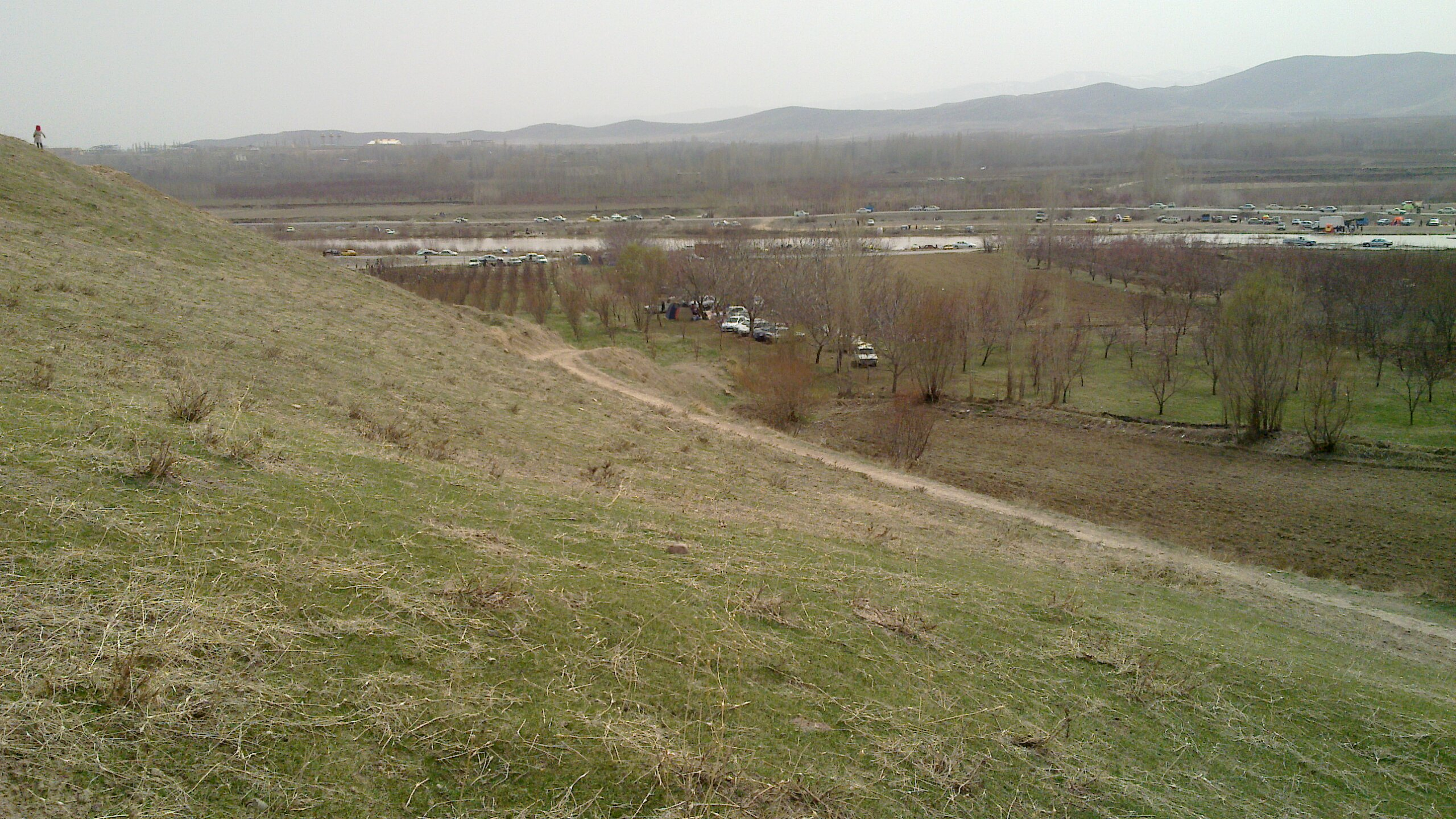
A distant view of the Nazlou Chay

The Nazlou Chay is a river in West Azarbaijan Province, Iran, where it flows into Lake Urmia. The river is part of the lake Urmia Catchment near the border of Iraq, Turkey, and Armenia. Excessive use of the river's water resources has contributed to the shrinking of Lake Urmia in recent years.
