= Simeneh-ye Sofla =

Village in Kermanshah, Iran

Simeneh-ye Sofla سيمينه سفلي
- Village
- Location within Iran
- Coordinates: 34°20′51″N 46°54′07″E
- Country: Iran
- Province: Kermanshah
- County: Kermanshah
- Bakhsh: Mahidasht
- Rural District: Mahidasht

Population (2006)
  - Total: 202
- Time zone: UTC+3:30 (IRST)
  - Summer (DST): UTC+4:30 (IRDT)

Simeneh-ye Sofla (Persian: سيمينه سفلي, also Romanized as Sīmeneh-ye Soflá; also known as Simināh, Sīmīneh, Sīmīneh-ye Pā'īn, and Sīmīneh-ye Soflá) is a village in Mahidasht Rural District, Mahidasht District, Kermanshah County, Kermanshah Province, Iran. At the 2006 census, its population was 202, in 47 families.
