= Rudkhaneh-ye Qal'eh Chay =

Coordinates: 36°57′13″N 47°40′09″E

Rudkhaneh-ye Qal'eh Chay (رودخانِۀ قَلعِه چای) is a river in northwest Iran.

It is located at 36° 57' 13"N and 47° 40' 09" E east of Zanjan, Iran.
