= Teppe Hasanlu =

Archaeological site in Iran

Teppe Hasanlu تپه حسنلو

- Location within Iran
- 37°00′16″N 45°27′30″E
- Type: Settlement
- Location: Hasanlu, Naqadeh, West Azerbaijan, Iran

Iran National Heritage List
- Official name: Tappeh Hasanlu
- Type: Mound
- Designated: 1965
- Reference no.: 485
- Conservation organization: Cultural Heritage, Handicrafts and Tourism Organization of Iran

Teppe Hasanlu (Persian: تپه حسنلو), is an archeological site of an ancient city located in the West Azerbaijan province of Iran, a short distance south of Lake Urmia. The nature of its destruction at the end of the 9th century BC essentially froze one layer of the city in time, providing researchers with extremely well preserved buildings, artifacts, and skeletal remains from the victims and enemy combatants of the attack. The site was likely associated with the Mannaeans and possibly with the Armenians.

Teppe Hasanlu is the largest site in the Gadar River valley and dominates the small plain known as Solduz. The site consists of a 25-m-high central "citadel" mound, with massive fortifications and paved streets, surrounded by a low outer town, 8 m above the surrounding plain. The entire site, once much larger but reduced in size by local agricultural and building activities, now measures about 600 m across, with the citadel having a diameter of about 200 m.

The site was inhabited fairly continuously from the 6th millennium BC to the 3rd century AD. It is famous for the Golden bowl of Hasanlu. Since June 2018, the Cultural Heritage, Handicrafts and Tourism Organization has pushed for the entire archeological site to be declared a UNESCO World Heritage Site.

== Name and etymology ==
The site is named after the nearby village of Hasanlu. Tepe (Persian: تپه, Azerbaijani: Təpə, also romanized teppe) is the Persian and Azerbaijani word for tell or hill, coming from the Old Turkic töpü (𐱅𐰇𐰯𐰇).

== Ethno-linguistic affiliation ==
The precise ethno-linguistic affiliation of the inhabitants of Hasanlu during the Bronze and Iron Ages remains a subject of scholarly debate. Archaeological evidence has at various times linked the site to Hurrian, Urartian, or Median cultural spheres, but no written records have been found at the site to definitively establish the language spoken by its population.

Genetic analysis of individuals from Hasanlu, conducted by Iosif Lazaridis et al. (2022), has provided new insights into the population's origins and possible linguistic connections. The study found that the Iron Age population of Hasanlu (~1000 BCE) possessed some Eastern European hunter-gatherer ancestry, though to a lesser extent than contemporaneous populations in Armenia. The Hasanlu individuals carried Y-chromosome haplogroups of R-M12149 (within R1b), linking them to the Yamnaya populations of the Bronze Age steppe. In contrast, they lacked R1a haplogroups, such as R-Z93, associated with steppe populations ancestral to Indo-Iranian speakers. The absence of R1a haplogroups among the 16 studied males from Hasanlu, combined with their patrilineal affinity with ancient populations of Armenia, suggests that the inhabitants may have spoken either a language related to the Armenian language or a non-Indo-European language of the local region. The findings support the hypothesis that Iranian languages, associated with R1a-bearing steppe groups, may have arrived on the Iranian plateau from Central Asia only in the first millennium BCE.

The findings at Hasanlu align with broader research on Bronze and Iron Age populations of the Armenian Highlands and adjacent regions. Hasanlu’s genetic and cultural profile parallels the Trialeti-Vanadzor culture (ca. 2400–1500 BCE), often seen as a candidate for the Proto-Armenian horizon. Both show steppe-related ancestry (notably R1b lineages) and shared material traits, suggesting regional connections across the highlands. Genetic studies also confirm that modern Armenians descend from ancient groups combining steppe and local ancestries. Linguistic evidence highlights Hasanlu’s role in the Proto-Armenian context. The Armenian language, a distinct branch of the Indo-European family, shares features with Greek, pointing to a contact zone within the Yamnaya horizon before the Bronze Age migrations, consistent with Hasanlu’s cultural links. Donald Ringe and Tandy Warnow propose that Pre-Armenian and Pre-Greek formed a closely related subgroup after 2500 BCE, while David Anthony dates Pre-Armenian’s divergence to around 2800 BCE. These findings place Hasanlu within a wider network significant for Proto-Armenian development, though exact details remain debated.

The Russian historian Igor M. Diakonov suggested that the Mannaeans, inhabitants of the region around Lake Urmia during the early first millennium BCE, were likely speakers of a Hurrian-related language. In the Hebrew Bible (Jeremiah 51:27), Mannaea is referred to as "Minni," mentioned alongside Ararat in a prophecy against Babylon. According to the Jewish Encyclopedia, “Minni” is interpreted in the Targum and Peshitta as a region in Armenia. Some scholars identify Minni with the Armenian district of Manavasean (Minyas), possibly the Mannaean polity mentioned in Assyrian records. A few theories suggest that the name "Armenia" itself may derive from the phrase “ḪAR Minni,” meaning “mountains of Minni.”

== Archaeology ==
After some licensed commercial digging by dealers, the site was first dug by Aurel Stein in 1936. Excavations were conducted by the Iranian Archaeological Service in 1947 and 1949 though it appears nothing was published. The site of Hasanlu was then excavated in 10 seasons between 1956 and 1974 by a team from the University Museum, University of Pennsylvania and the Metropolitan Museum. The project was directed by Robert H. Dyson Jr. and is considered today to have been an important training ground for a generation of highly successful Near Eastern archaeologists.

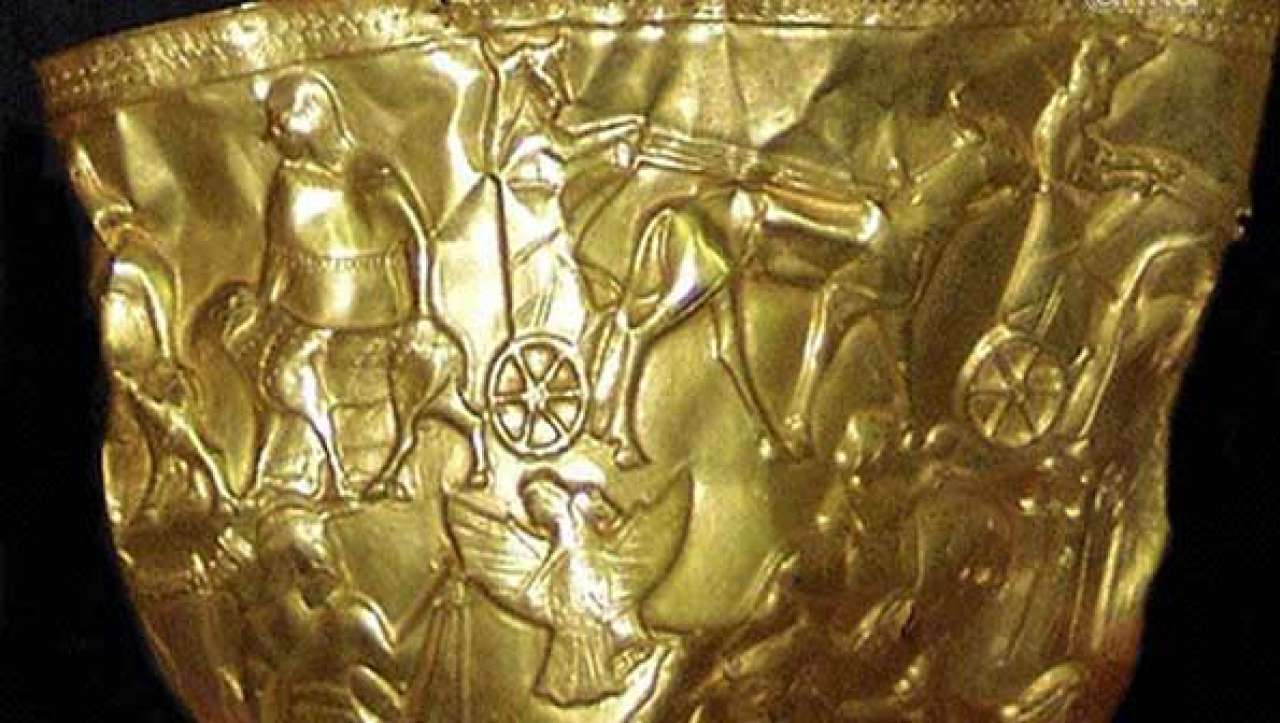
The Golden bowl of Hasanlu

Originally, excavations in the Ushnu-Solduz Valley were intended to explore a series of stratified occupation levels in the area with the objective of reconstructing a regional cultural history from Neolithic times until Alexander the Great's conquest of Persia beginning in 334 BC, such that any conclusions would rely solely on material evidence from the region itself, independent of linguistic or literary evidence from adjoining regions. The unexpected discovery of the famous "Gold Bowl" at Hasanlu in 1958 led to the project shifting its focus to the Iron Age levels at this site, although several other sites in the region were also excavated in order to stay in line with the project's broader objective. A silver cup was found at the same time. These other excavations were conducted at Dinkha Tepe, Dalma Tepe, Hajji Firuz Tepe, Agrab Tepe, Pisdeli, and Seh Girdan.

The Hasanlu Publications Project was initiated in 2007 to produce the official monograph-length final reports on the excavation. Currently two Excavation Reports and several Special Studies volumes have been completed.

=== Dalma Tepe ===
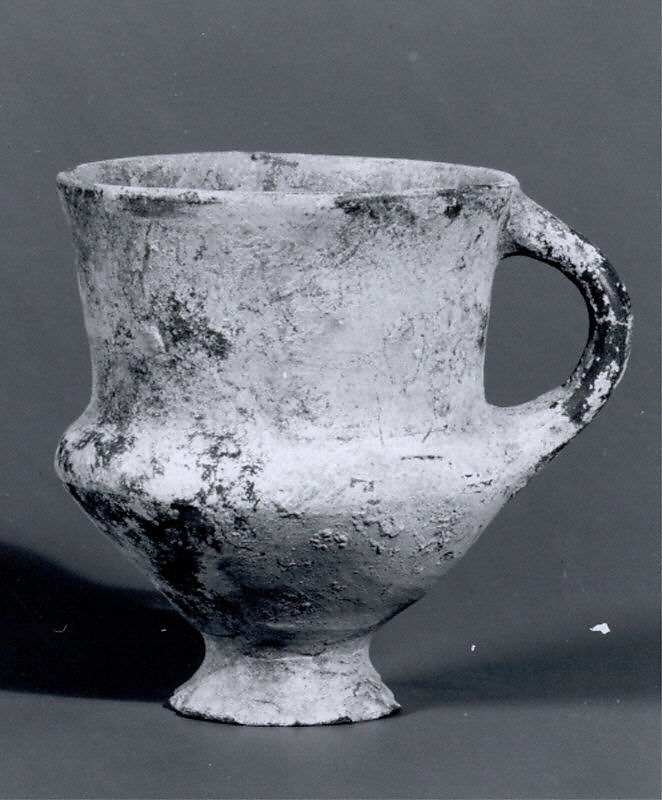
Ceramic button-base cup excavated in Dalma Tepe

Dalma Tepe is a small mound located about 5 km southwest of Ḥasanlū Tepe, near the modern village of Dalma, which is a type site of Dalma culture. It is approximately 50 m in diameter. It was excavated by Charles Burney and T. Cuyler Young Jr., in 1958–1961 in three seasons totally less than one month.

Large quantities of handmade, chaff-tempered pottery were found.

'Dalma painted ware' is decorated with large patterns of triangles in deep shades on red.

Similar pottery has been found at Seh Gābī and Godin Tepe, attributed to Period X. Kul Tepe Jolfa is another related site from the same period. It is located north of Lake Urmia.

== History ==
The excavators originally divided the site’s occupation history into ten periods based on the nature of material finds in the different strata: the oldest, Level X, stretches back to the Neolithic period, after which there was fairly continuous occupation until the early Iron Age (ca 1250–330 BC), followed by a hiatus before subsequent reoccupation; occupation finally ends in Iran’s medieval period (Hasanlu period I).

=== Middle Bronze Age (Level VI) ===
Starting in the Middle Bronze III period or Hasanlu VIa (1600–1450 BC), there are important changes in material culture. This is best attested at the site of Dinkha Tepe, but is also present at Hasanlu. The most obvious change is the rapid abandonment of old styles of pottery, especially painted Khabur Ware, and the increased importance in producing monochrome unpainted pottery that is frequently polished or burnished. This ware is known as Monochrome Burnished Ware or, formerly, "Grey Ware"; however the ware occurs in a wide range of colors and thus is something of a misnomer.

=== Late Bronze Age (Level V) ===
In the Late Bronze Age or Hasanlu Period V, Monochrome Burnished Ware came to dominate the ceramic assemblages of the Ushnu and Solduz valleys of the southern Lake Urmia Basin. Some scholars link changes in pottery forms to cultural contact with Assyria, this being a period of expansion for the Middle Assyrian kingdom, when such kings as Adad-nirari I (1295–1264 BC), Shalmaneser I (1263–1234 BC), and Tukulti-Ninurta I (1233–1197 BC) were conducting campaigns into the Zagros Mountains to the south. During this time, there was occupation on the High Mound and Low Mound of Hasanlu, and graves have been excavated at Dinkha Tepe and Hasanlu.

=== Iron Age (Level IV–III) ===
At around 1250 BC, there are some changes in the material culture at Hasanlu and in the graves excavated at Dinkha. This marks the beginning of the Iron I period, formerly identified with Hasanlu Period V but now the equivalent of Hasanlu IVc. While this period is designated the Iron I, there is virtually no iron in use during this period — two iron finger rings are known from Hasanlu.

In previous scholarship, it was believed that there was an abrupt change in material culture due to the arrival of iron-using population to the area before the Hasanlu IVc period. But subsequent research by Michael Danti tried to clarify these matters, and currently these theories are no longer accepted.

The High Mound of Hasanlu was almost certainly fortified during this period, and an internal gateway, large residential structures, and possibly a temple were located in this citadel. The Low Mound was also occupied, the best evidence of this coming from a house excavated in 1957 and 1959 dubbed the "Artisan's House". This structure derives its name from the fact that evidence for metalworking, primarily the casting of copper/bronze objects, was found there.

At the end of Hasanlu IVc/Iron I, Hasanlu was destroyed by a fire. Evidence of this destruction was discovered on the High and Low Mound. This destruction dates to around 800 BC, based on radiocarbon dating, and it marks the beginning of the Iron II period. While the destruction was extensive, the settlement's occupants seem to have rebuilt the citadel and the buildings of the Lower Town rapidly, cutting down the mudbrick walls of the burned structures to their stone footings and erecting new brick walls. The buildings of the Iron II settlement were based on their Iron I precursors, but were also larger and more elaborate in their layout and ornamentation. The primary example of this being the monumental columned halls of the citadel.

The continued presence in significant quantities of Assyrian goods or copies, alongside objects of local manufacture, attest to continued cultural contact with Assyria at this time; iron first appears in bulk at Hansanlu at around the same time Assyria seized control of the metal trade in Asia Minor. While the Neo-Assyrian Empire was beginning a period of renewed power and influence in the 9th century, it is also at this time that the existence of the kingdom of Urartu, centered around Lake Van, is first attested in the Neo-Assyrian annals and related literature. By the time we hear about it, it is already a fully developed state – the circumstances attending its rise in the 2nd millennium are obscure. Urartu’s expansion during this period brought the area south of Lake Urmia under its influence, although material finds at Hasanlu suggest that the city may have remained independent. Nevertheless, Hansanlu was catastrophically destroyed,

We know a great deal about Iron II/Hasanlu IVb because of the violent sacking and burning at around 800 BC, probably by the Urartians. Over 285 human victims were found where they had been slain. Some victims were mutilated and distributions of other bodies and the wounds they received suggest mass executions. Amid the burned remains of the settlement the excavators found thousands of objects in situ. Hasanlu IVb is a veritable Pompeii of the early Iron Age Near East. Some have suggested that the Iron II culture of Hasanlu, which has close ties to Mesopotamia and northern Syria, indicates the settlement came under the control of a foreign power, or experienced an influx of new occupants, or perhaps made internal changes to its political system.

The Iron II settlement was fortified and was perhaps entered via a fortified road system located on the southwest side of the High Mound, although this interpretation of the archaeological remains of this area has come under increasing scrutiny in more recent analyses. Two areas of the citadel were investigated by the Hasanlu Project. In the west, buildings that served to control access into the citadel, a possible arsenal (Burned Building VII), and a large residential structure (Burned Building III) were investigated. South of this was Burned Building (BB) I and BB I East. These buildings formed a fortified gateway into the Lower Court area. BBI was also an elite residence. It was in this building in 1958 that the famous Gold Bowl of Hasanlu was discovered. The buildings of the Lower Court (BBII, BBIV, BBBIV East, and BBV) were arranged around a stone-paved court. Burned Building II likely served as a temple, and it was in this building that the excavators found over 70 massacred women and children — only a few adult males were found among the victims.

Following Hasanlu's destruction, the High Mound was used as the site for a Urartian fortress. A fortification wall with towers at regular intervals was constructed around the edges of the High Mound. Hasanlu was occupied fairly continuously during Period IIIa (the Achaemenid Period) and Period II (the Seleuco-Parthian Period).

=== Post Iron Age (Levels II and I) ===
In Level II was found a house of the 4th Century BC. An Islamic settlement of the 14th century AD was discovered in Level I.

== Photo gallery ==
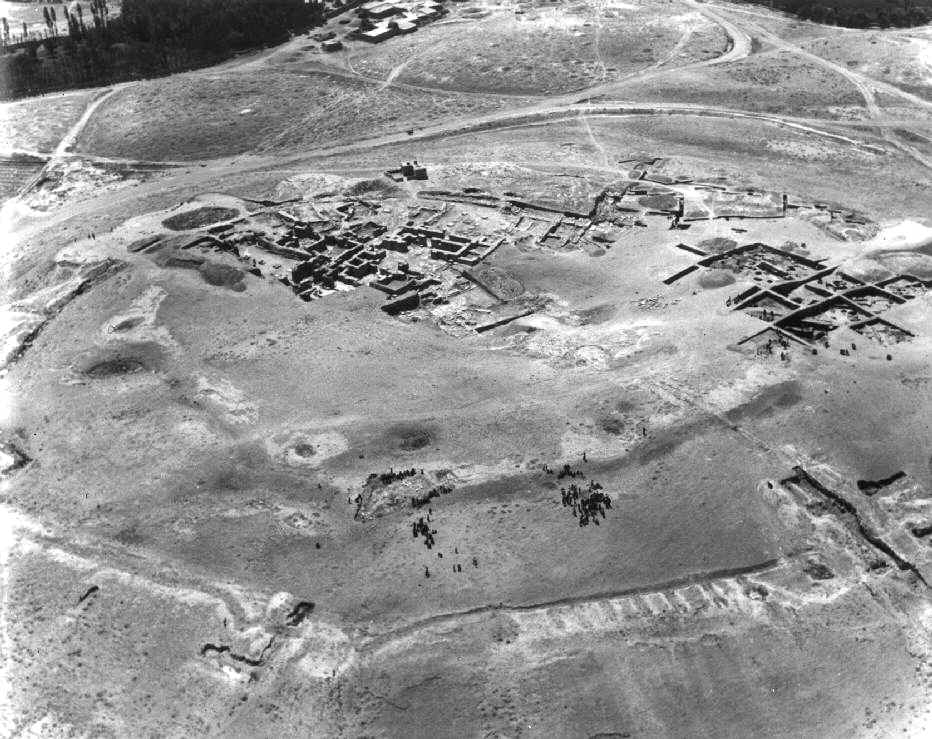

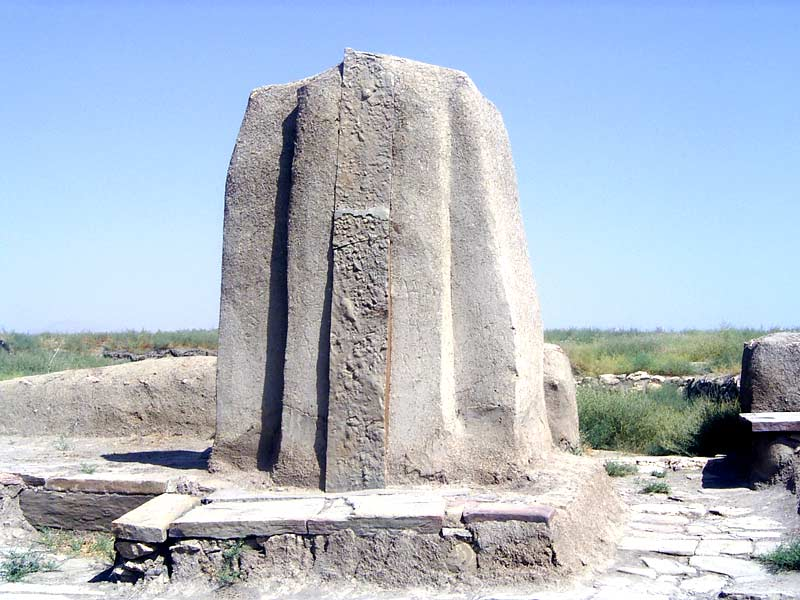

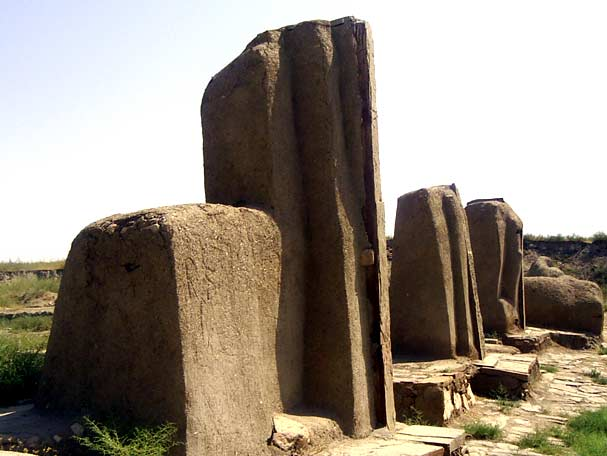

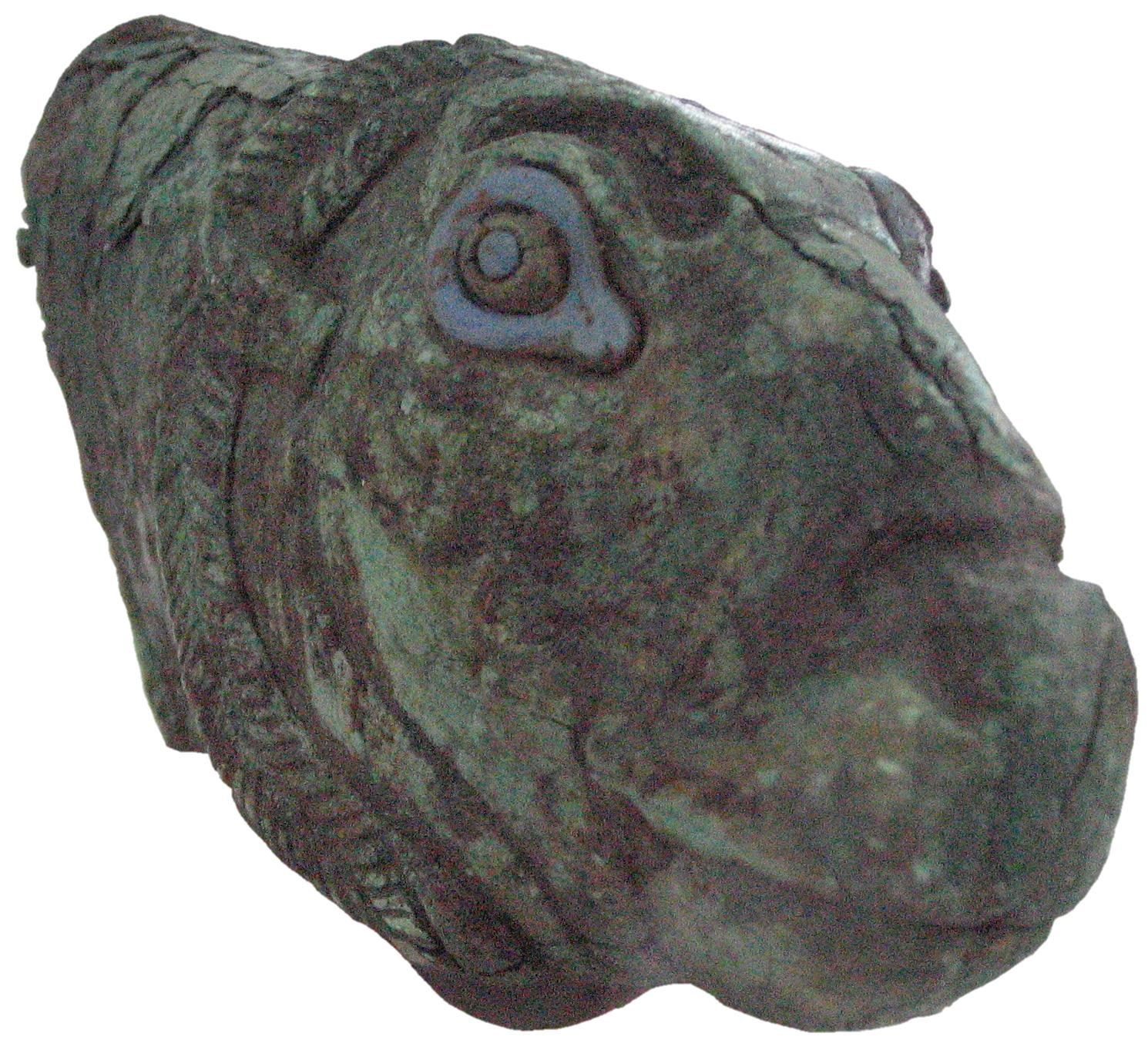
Bronze drinking vessel, Hasanlu, 1st mil BC. National Museum of Iran

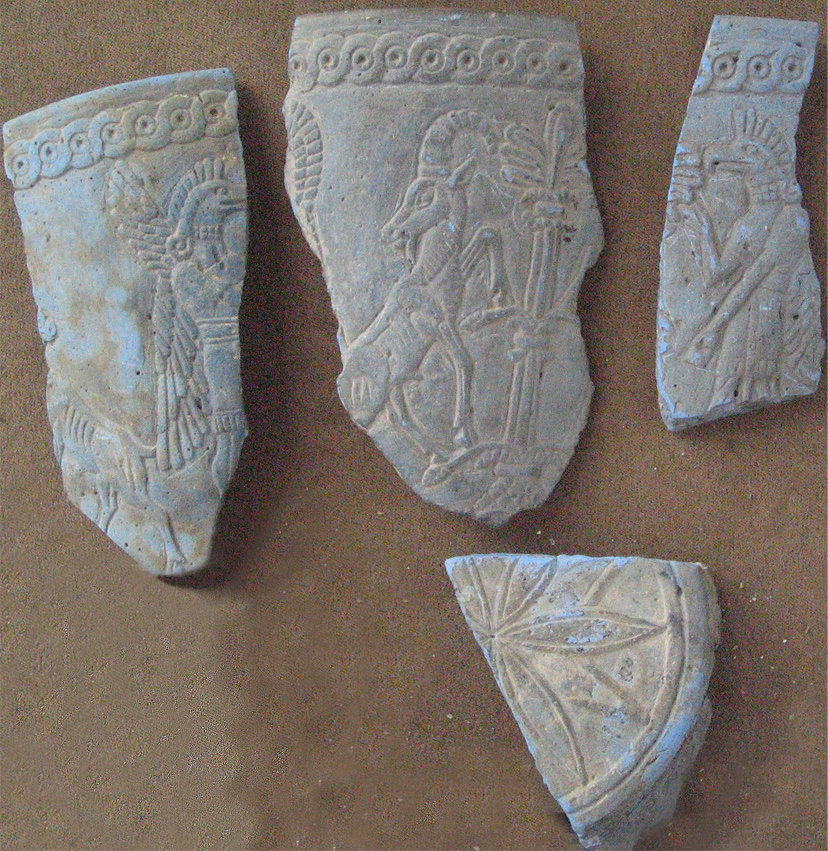
Egyptian blue, Hasanlu, 1st mil BC. National Museum of Iran

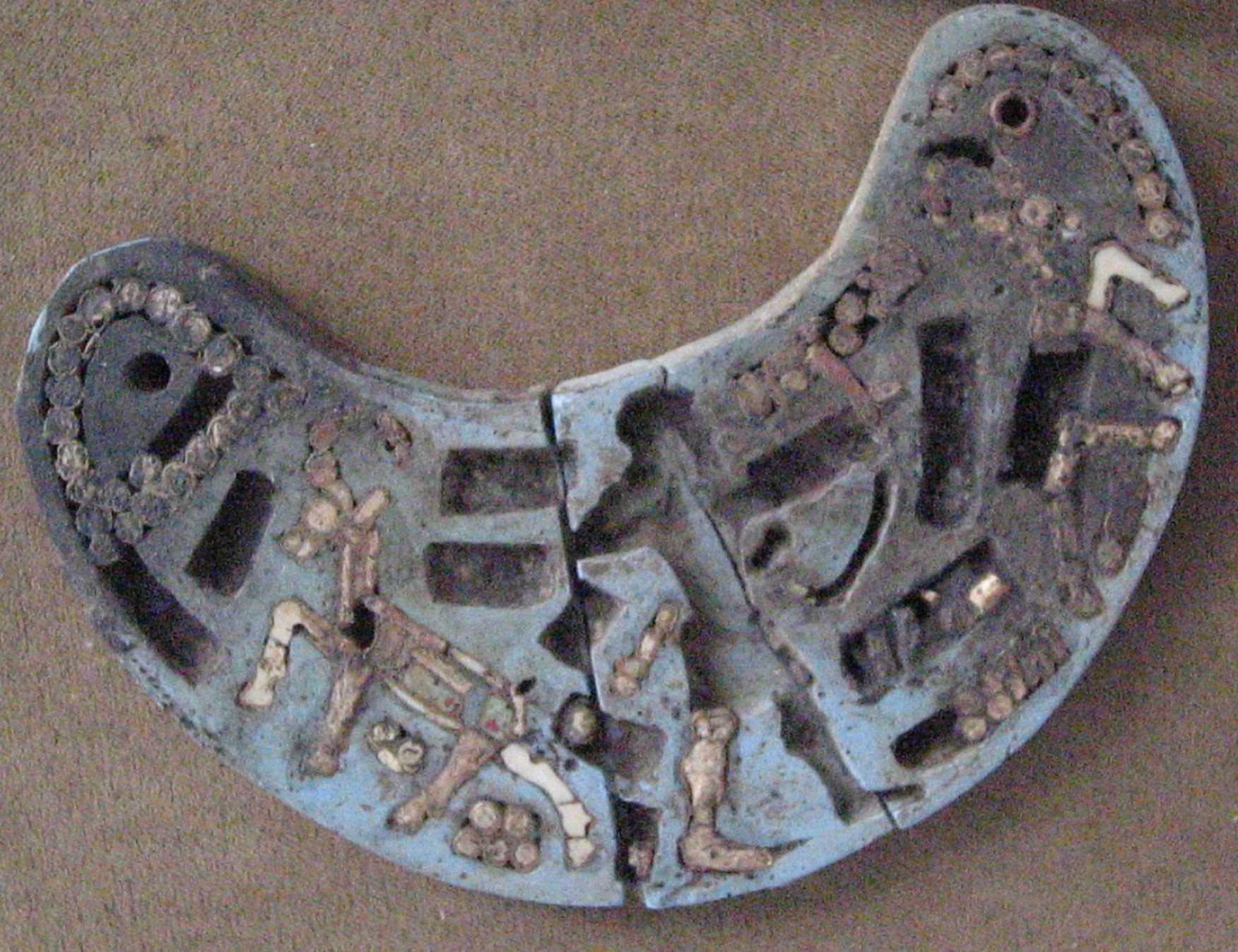
Crescent-shaped plaque, Hasanlu, early 1st mil BC. National Museum of Iran

== See also ==
- Kul Tepe Jolfa
- Golden cup of Hasanlu
- Hasanlu Lovers
- Cities of the Ancient Near East
- Short chronology timeline
