= Simineh River =

Coordinates: 37°13′43″N 45°42′40″E

Simineh river Tatahoo river (kurdish)
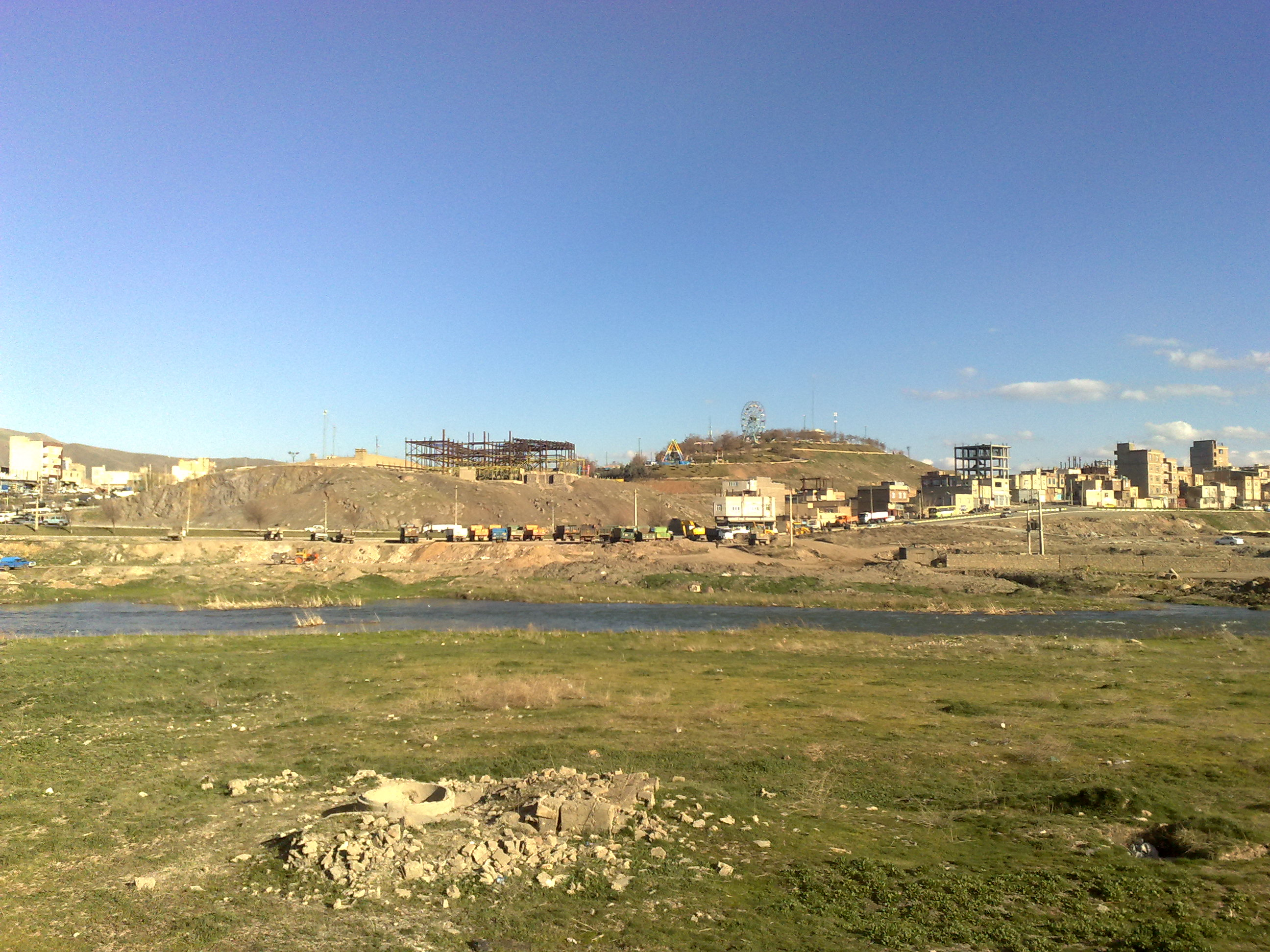

Location
- Country: Iran
- Province: Kurdistan province, West Azarbaijan province

Physical characteristics
- Source
  - location: Saqqez, Zagros Mountains
- Mouth
  - location: Lake Urmia, Iran

The Simineh River (Persian: سیمینه‌رود Sīmīnerūd, Sīmmīneh Rūd), also known as the Tatavi Chay (Tatāhū Čāy), is a river in northern Iran, arising in the Zagros Mountains of Kurdistan province north of Saqqez, that flows into the south end of Lake Urmia. It is just over 200 kilometres (124 mi) long and has a catchment basin (watershed) of 2,090 square kilometres (810 mi^{2}). Its waters are used primarily for agriculture and the return flow significantly degrades its water quality.

Like its twin the Zarrineh River to the east, the Simineh arises in the Zagros Mountains of Kurdistan province and flows north through West Azerbaijan province. Compared to the Zarrineh, the Simineh has considerably less flow into Lake Urmia. Like the rest of the streams in the basin, the river has a seasonal variability in its flow rates, but during the spring run-off the river can discharge as much as 57,000 litres per second (15,000 US gal/s) into Lake Urmia.

The Simineh River flows just to the west of the city of Bukan, and provides some of their water.
