= Nakhchivan Tepe =

Chalcolithic settlement in Nakhchivan, Azerbaijan

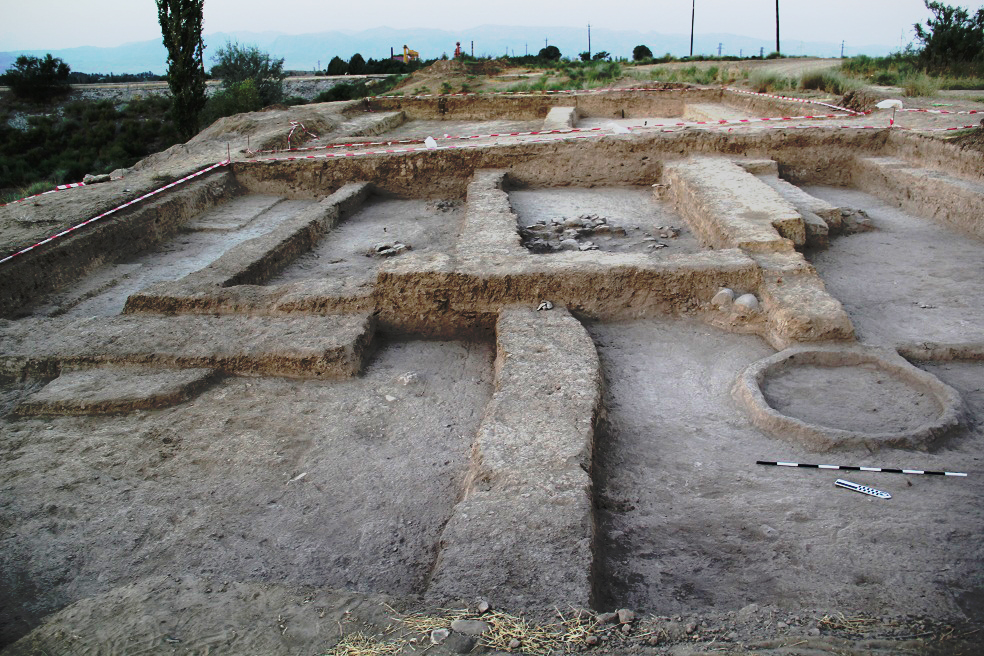
- Type: Settlement
- Location: Nakhchivan, Azerbaijan

History
- Built: c. 5000 BC

Nakhchivan Tepe (Naxçıvantəpə) is a Chalcolithic settlement in Nakhchivan, Azerbaijan. It is located in Nakhchivan and is dated to around 5000 BC. It is on the right bank of the Nakhchivançay River at an altitude of 850m.

About five km north of it is located Kultepe-1 site, which was the first Neolithic-Chalcolithic archaeological site to be investigated in Nakhchivan.

Archaeological research in Naxçıvantəpə led by Veli Bakhshaliyev from Nakhichevan, a branch of the National Academy of Sciences of Azerbaijan, began in 2017.

The first settlers of Naxçıvantəpə lived in houses partly dug into the ground, and partly built of mud brick. Similar constructions were uncovered during the excavation of the Ovçular Təpəsi and some other settlements in the area.

Animal bones show that the residents mostly engaged in livestock farming. The inhabitants practised cattle and caprine herding for their subsistence. Only a few horse and dog bones were found. Hunting represented only an insignificant place in the economy.

The upper horizon of the settlement is characterized by rectangular architecture, whereas in the lower levels round dwellings are more common.

== Pottery ==
Painted ceramics of the Dalma culture have been found at Nakhchivan Tepe. It shows great variety.

Ceramics of the upper horizon are represented by six types:

- plain ceramics,
- painted ceramics,
- red slipped ceramics without ornament,
- ceramics with impressed ornament and impressed fingerprints,
- stamp-decorated pottery,
- decorated ceramics with a border ornament in the form of horizontal stripes.

Ceramics of the lower horizon are rather similar to those of the upper horizon.

According to Guliyeva (2023), simple chaff-tempered pottery of Nakhchivantepe "reflects the characteristics of the Kültepe culture (6372-5200 BC), which appeared in the Neolithic period in the Nakhchivanchay valley."

And later, groups of ceramics begin to reflect Dalmatepe culture sites. There are also parallels with the surface-manipulated ceramics of Mil-Karabakh area. She also argues that the Dalmatepe culture of Iran reflects the influence of the Azerbaijani Neolithic cultures.

Uzun oba is another similar chalcolithic site in the area where Dalma ceramics was found. Another such site is Ucan Agil. But neither of these sites have as much Dalma ceramics as Nakhchivan Tepe.

== Obsidian trade ==
The settlements in the Lake Urmiah basin in Iran, where Dalma tradition is based, traded the obsidian from the deposits of the Zangezur mountain range, and Nakhchivan was the intermediary.

Relatively little of obsidian has been found at Nakhchivan Tepe so far, compared to the Uçan Ağıl settlement located only about 20km to the north. Yet, at Nakhchivan Tepe, a lot more sources of obsidian have been attested. As concerns the provenance of the obsidian, at Uçan Ağıl it was tapped from only three different beds, but it mostly comes from Syunik (98%).

"This stands in sharp contrast with the obsidian assemblages of Nakhchivan Tepe, where the obsidian from six different beds are attested (Syunik, Geghasar-Gegham, Gügürbaba-Meydan, Gutansar, Hatis, Arteni) with an almost equal proportion of the Geghasar-Gegham and Syunik sources (fig. 1)."

Also some copper ore was found at Nakhchivan Tepe which also originated at Zangezur mountains.

== See also ==
- History of Azerbaijan
- Kul Tepe Jolfa
- Maxta
- Zeyvə, Nakhchivan

== Bibliography ==
- * Guliyeva, Zeyneb (2023-08-15). "Neolithic Traditions on the Northern Periphery of the Dalmatepe Culture". Eminak. 2 (42): 22–36. doi:10.33782/eminak2023.2(42).639. ISSN 2708-0226.
- Marro, Catherine (2022-07-29). "The View from the North" (PDF). Paléorient (48–1). OpenEdition: 111–130. doi:10.4000/paleorient.1675. ISSN 0153-9345.
