= Kültepe (disambiguation) =

Kültepe (literally "ash hill" in Turkic languages) may refer to:

== Archaeological sites ==
- Kültepe is a village and an important ancient site in Kayseri Province, Turkey. Also known as 'Kanesh', an Assyrian karum trading colony.
- Kültəpə (Kultepe-1), a village and Chalcolithic site in the Babek District of Nakhchivan region, Azerbaijan
- Kultepe-2 (II Kultepe), an Early Bronze Age monument in Nakhchivan region of Azerbaijan.
- Maxta, also known as Makhta Kultepe, in the Sharur District of Nakhchivan, Azerbaijan. Includes 'Makhta Kultepe I' Bronze Age site, as well as 'Makhta Kultepe II'.
- Kul Tepe Jolfa, an ancient archaeological site in the Jolfa County of Iran

== Other ==
- Kültepe Dam, a dam in Turkey

== See also ==
- Gültepe, Aksaray, a village in the central district of Aksaray Province, Turkey
- Gültepe, Kağıthane, a neighbourhood of Istanbul, Turkey
