= Ziyafat Asgarov =

Azerbaijani politician

- Ziyafət Əsgərov
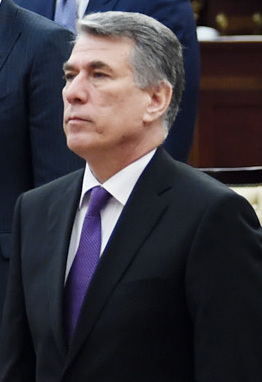

First Deputy Speaker of the National Assembly of Azerbaijan
- Incumbent
- Assumed office 29 November 2010
- In office 2 December 2005 – 29 November 2010

Deputy Speaker of the National Assembly of Azerbaijan
- In office 24 November 2000 – 2 December 2005

Personal details
- Born: 24 October 1963 (age 62) Aşağı Uzunoba, Babek Rayon of Nakhchivan AR, Azerbaijan

Ziyafat Abbas oglu Asgarov (Azerbaijani: Ziyafət Abbas oğlu Əsgərov; born 24 October 1963) is a professor and an Azerbaijani politician serving as the First Deputy Speaker of the National Assembly of Azerbaijan.

== Early life ==
Asgarov was born on 24 October 1963 in Aşağı Uzunoba village of Babek Rayon, Nakhchivan AR of Azerbaijan. He graduated from Azerbaijan State University cum laude. From 1990, he worked as a professor at the Law Department, deputy director of the department, assistant dean of the Law Department at the Azerbaijan State University. Currently, he's also a professor of the Constitutional Law Department of the same university. In 1995, he was one of the members of the working group of a commission which drafted the Constitution of Azerbaijan.

He's a PhD in law and an author to several textbooks and dozens of scientific publications. Asgarov has been teaching Constitutional law at Baku State University Law School. One of his notable students is Subhan Aliyev, a leading jurist on administrative law in Azerbaijan.

Asgarov is married and has two children.

== Political career ==
Asgarov was elected deputy to the National Assembly of Azerbaijan in 1995 parliamentary elections and subsequently re-elected in 2000 and 2005 elections. From 24 November 2000 to 2 December 2005 he served as the Deputy Speaker, and from 2 December 2005 until 29 November 2010, he served as the First Deputy Speaker of the National Assembly. Asgarov was again re-elected to the National Assembly from 76th Lankaran-Astara electoral district in November 2010 parliamentary elections and remains the First Deputy Speaker of Azerbaijani Parliament. Asgarov is also the Chairman of the Defense and Security Committee of the National Assembly and head of the Azerbaijani delegation to the NATO Parliamentary Assembly.

== See also ==
- Cabinet of Azerbaijan
- Government of Azerbaijan
