= Kultepe-2 =

- Location within Azerbaijan
- 39°16′15″N 45°27′17″E
- Type: Settlement
- Periods: Bronze Age
- Location: Uzunoba, Nakhchivan, Azerbaijan
- Region: Babek

History
- Built: Approximately 3500-2400 BC

Site notes
- Material: brick, stone, clay
- Area: 10 ha (25 acres)

Kultepe-2 (also known as II Kultepe) is an ancient settlement in Nakhchivan. It is located about 1.5 km north of the related ancient site of Kultepe-1, or about 10 km north of Nakhchivan (city) on the west bank of Nakhchivanchay (Nakhchivan river; de:Naxçıvançay) river between the villages of Kültepe and Didivar. In ancient times, the site reached nearly 10 ha in size, but the river erosion reduced this now to about 3 ha. Chehrichay (Chehri river) connects in this area with Nakhchivan river.

The earliest layer of the settlement is 7–10 m. in thickness; it dates back to the Early Bronze Age and is related to Kura–Araxes culture. The remains of circular-shaped buildings built of bricks were discovered there. The results of the radiocarbon (C 14) analysis show the age of 3500–2400 years BC.

The thickness of the second layer of this monument is more than 4 meters. Dating to the II millennium, it consists of four construction stages, detailing the lives of Kultepe residents. Protective walls were built around the place of residence. Along with the remains of residential buildings, economic and industrial buildings were also revealed. Large-scale painted containers, stone, bone and bronze tools, ornaments, weapons were also found. This is when the settlement reached the maximum extent.

Residents of Kultepe used sophisticated construction technique using bricks and stones to construct the defense fortress and the residential and farm buildings. The compound-built defense fortress was further strengthened with quadrangular blocks.

== Pottery ==
In Kultepe-2, both monochrome and polychrome clay pots were used. They are different in shape. The patterns on clay pots are rich. In addition to geometric patterns, there are also figurative designs.

== Quadrangular building ==
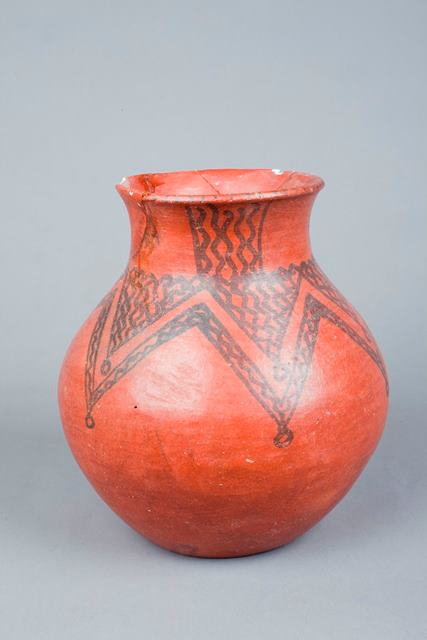
A painted earthenware jug discovered at the Kultepe-2 settlement. Museum of History of Azerbaijan

The ruins of a quadrangular building were uncovered in section III of the site. The floors of buildings were constructed mainly from raw bricks and soil and stone.

Kultepe-2 was an urban-type settlements during the Middle Bronze Age, when it covered 3 ha of living space. The residence is surrounded by massive fortress walls. The walls had a width of 2 m and it was built on a mud-mounted stonework. Large square bricks were used in the construction of the walls (32x32x11 cm; 38x38x12 cm; 40x40x12 cm; 44x44x12 cm).

At some point, the fortress wall was destroyed. After a while it was restored, but the area is significantly reduced. In the eastern and southern part of the tower, a new one is being built instead of an old wall.

Residential and commercial buildings were made of mud hardened stones. Some houses have a few rooms. Big fire destroyed buildings; an old man's bones were found in the remains of fire.

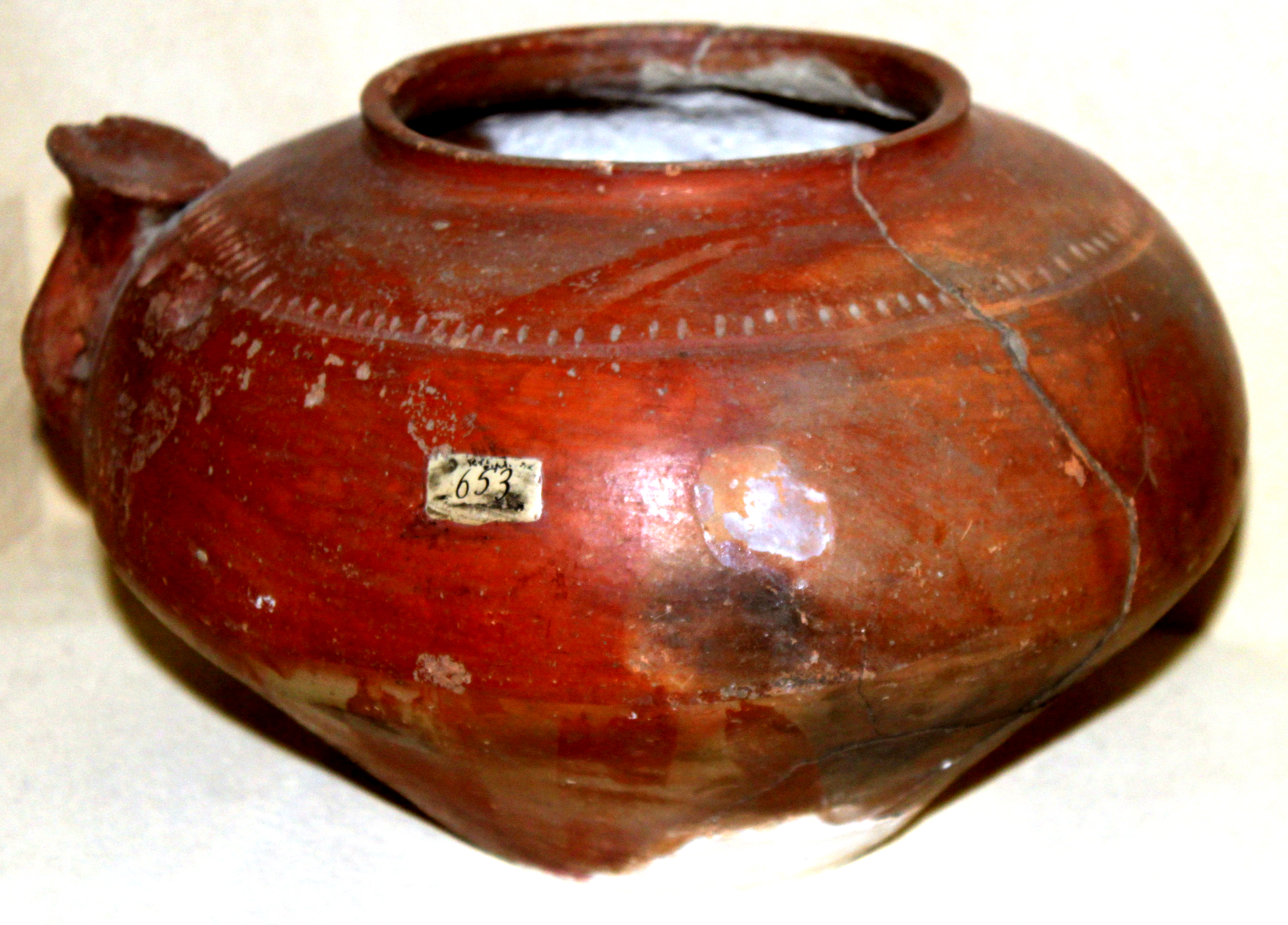
A teapot-type bronze vessel from Kultepe-2. Painted Ware Culture

During the Middle Bronze Age, four construction layers and more than 4 m cultural layers in Kültepe are indicated. There are plenty of different materials from the place of residence.

The pottery district with kilns, featuring stone flooring was discovered. Various types of simple and painted dishes, stone tools such as grinding stone, teeth, grain residues, metal goods, and clay metal moulds were found. Although the embroidery features mostly geometric shapes, human, bird and animal images are also found.

== Bibliography ==
- Hali̇Lov, Toğrul (2023-12-25). "Pottery in the Bronze Age of Nakhchivan". Akademik Tarih ve Dusunce Dergisi. doi:10.46868/atdd.2023.581. ISSN 2148-2292.
