= Bülövqaya =

Chalcolithic archaeological settlement in Nakhchivan, Azerbaijan

- Bülövqaya
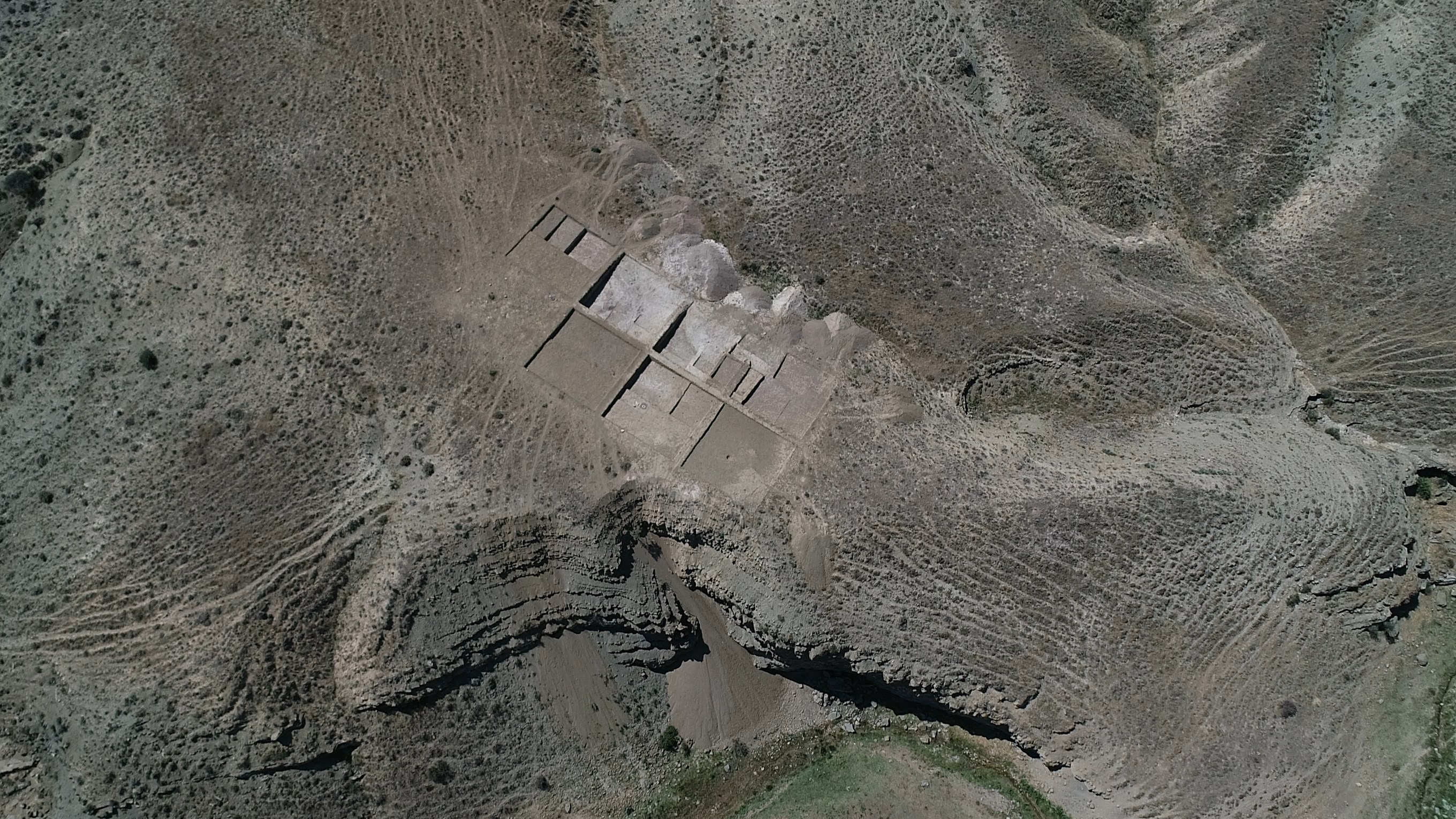
- Aerial view of the Bülövqaya settlement

- Location in Azerbaijan
- 39°17′00″N 45°38′17″E
- Type: Chalcolithic settlement
- Location: Göynük village, Babek District, Nakhchivan Autonomous Republic, Azerbaijan

History
- Built: c. 5000–4350 BC

Site notes
- Excavation dates: 2023–2025
- Archaeologists: Vəli Bəxşəliyev
- Discovered: 2023

Bülövqaya is a Chalcolithic (Eneolithic) archaeological settlement located south of the village of Göynük in the Babek District of the Nakhchivan Autonomous Republic, Azerbaijan. The site lies on the left bank of the Sarısu River at an elevation between 1,430 and 1,452 metres above sea level and represents one of the region’s major early farming communities.

== Discovery and research ==
Archaeological research at Bülövqaya began in 2023 with a series of 2 × 2 m and 2 × 3 m test trenches. Between 2024 and 2025, large-scale excavations were carried out in seven 10 × 10 m squares directed by archaeologist Vəli Bəxşəliyev of the Nakhchivan branch of the National Academy of Sciences of Azerbaijan. The excavations revealed well-preserved stratigraphy, architectural features and a diverse assemblage of material culture.

== Chronology ==
Radiocarbon analyses define a clear Eneolithic occupation sequence.

- The upper horizon, represented by sample LTL21697, produced an age of **5674 ± 45 BP** (4508–4353 cal BC).
- The lower horizon yielded two dates:
  - LTL33702 — 6001 ± 45 BP (5007–4782 cal BC)
  - LTL33701 — 5968 ± 45 BP (4953–4723 cal BC)

Together, these dates indicate that Bülövqaya was occupied continuously between **c. 5000 and 4350 BC**, contemporaneous with sites such as Ovçular Tepe and other early agropastoral settlements in the South Caucasus.

== Archaeological findings ==
Excavations produced an extensive assemblage dominated by ceramic artefacts, alongside obsidian blades, flint tools, grinding stones, faunal remains, hearths and storage pits. More than **10,000 pottery sherds** were recovered, including:

- pink unpainted ware (majority)
- painted ceramics
- brown and black-grey vessels
- incised, impressed and knobbed decorations

Architectural features include rectangular domestic structures, hearths, storage pits and ceramic kilns, indicating a long-term and organized settlement layout.

The ceramic assemblage exhibits parallels with the Ubaid and Urmia Basin traditions, reflecting cultural interaction between the South Caucasus, northern Mesopotamia and eastern Anatolia during the Chalcolithic.

== Significance ==
Bülövqaya represents a distinctive Eneolithic cultural tradition integrating South Caucasian development with wider Near Eastern influences. The presence of Ubaid-type painted bowls and cream-slipped ceramics demonstrates long-distance cultural connections extending from northern Mesopotamia to the South Caucasus. These finds position Bülövqaya not as a peripheral site but as an independent regional interaction centre, distinct from the Dalma Tepe cultural sphere.

== See also ==
- Archaeology of Azerbaijan
- Nakhchivan Autonomous Republic
