= Dizə, Sharur =

Dizə
- Municipality
- Location within Azerbaijan
- Coordinates: 39°35′06″N 45°03′42″E
- Country: Azerbaijan
- Autonomous republic: Nakhchivan
- District: Sharur

Population (2005)
  - Total: 1,791
- Time zone: UTC+4 (AZT)

Dizə (also, Diza and Dize) is a village and municipality in the Sharur District of Nakhchivan Autonomous Republic, Azerbaijan. It is located on the left bank of the river Arpachay (Arpa), on the Sharur plain. On the other side of the river is the village of Oğlanqala.

Its population is busy with gardening, vegetable-growing, grain-growing and animal husbandry. There are secondary school, library, club, kindergarten and a medical center in the village. It has a population of 1,791.

== Etymology ==
In the ancient Iranian languages the word of dizə means "wall, fence," "fortified town", "fortress wall", "fortress", "fortified". It passed in to several Turkic languages, including Azerbaijani language and is used in meaning as "village".

== Historical and archaeological monuments ==
=== Ovcular Tepesi ===
Ovçular Tepesi is located just to the north of Dize village, on the left bank of the Arpachay River. It is a settlement from the 5th-3rd millenniums BC. This is a strategic point at the foot of the highlands; the site is at the crossroads of major trade routes linking the Iranian plateau to Anatolia (east to west), and the Caucasus to North Mesopotamia (north to south).

The monument is located on a natural hill. The area of the monument is about 10 hectares. The characteristic feature of the site is that the Kura-Araxes layer is not covered by any cultural layers of later periods. During the excavations of VH Aliyev and AK Seyidov, the remains of two buildings were found at a depth of 0.6 m.

During the period of 2006–2011, a joint Azerbaijani-French expedition conducted a survey of the site. The residents engaged in agriculture, cattle breeding, fishing, and other farming activities.

In 2010, some Ubaid period materials were found.

Discovered archaeological materials are similar to Kultepe, Azerbaijan, Makhta Kultepe and other Chalcolithic era monuments.

At Ovcular, three large copper axes were found in an infant burial jar, coming from Late Chalcolithic occupation levels (4400–3950 BC). Also, pieces of copper ore, crucible remains, and some small metal artifacts were found. Such large copper tools are not known anywhere else in southwestern Asia. Metallurgy was being practiced here, and at other sites in the area.

=== Dize Necropolis ===
Dizə Necropolis is an archaeological monument of the early Bronze Age to the west of the village. It was discovered during the farm work in 1969. The material remains from two graves were then collected, and the better preserved grave was investigated. The walls of the grave chamber were built from river stone, covered with mud; the floor was also plastered with mud.

Bone remains indicate two people were buried here. They were in wrapped position, with their heads to the south side. Ceramic containers were also found. Discovered samples of the material culture show that the monument belongs to the Kura–Araxes culture.
