= Oğlanqala =

- Municipality
- Location within Azerbaijan
- Coordinates: 39°35′13″N 45°02′46″E
- Country: Azerbaijan
- Autonomous republic: Nakhchivan
- District: Sharur

Population (2005)
  - Total: 2,959
- Time zone: UTC+4 (AZT)

Oğlanqala (also, Oghlangala) is a village and municipality in the Sharur District of Nakhchivan, Azerbaijan. It is located on the bank of the Arpachay, opposite from the village of Dizə, Sharur (Dize). Its population is busy with grain-growing and animal husbandry. There are secondary school, cultural house, library, a medical center, the fortress walls from architectural monuments and 3 towers in the village. It has a population of 2,959.

== Etymology ==
The settlement took its name from nearby ancient fortress of Oğlanqala (Oghlangala).

== Historical and archaeological monuments ==
=== Oğlanqala Fortress ===
Oğlanqala - the settlement of the 2-1 centuries of BC in the Sharur region. It is on the bank of the Arpachay River of the Qaratəpə (Garatepe) Mount. Its area is 40 hectares. The thickness of the cultural layer is more than 3 m. The northern slopes of the mountain is the precipice. But the other slopes were surrounded by the grandiose defensive wall. The walls has been built with the giant stones of length in 1.5–3 m, the thickness of more than 1 m. In some places of the walls remained 4 rows of stones. There are semicircular towers similar to small towers in the south-west of the mountain. To the construction style, the Oğlanqala is similar to the mountain fortresses of the Assyrians. The stone column which were discovered in the center of the flat little square (its area 70х100 m) of Oğlanqala, shown that here in the past has been the various buildings. The little square, in some places were surrounded with the walls. Most of the founded materials consist from the gray and pink colored pottery. The grain stones made from tuff, glazed and unglazed pottery of the late Middle Ages, etc. samples of material culture of the 2nd half of the 1st millennium of BC and 1-2 centuries of AD, was collected from Oğlanqala. Its location in the favorable geographical and strategic position, show that the Oğlanqala fortress has long been used as a fortification. At the result of researches, was determined that the main activities period of the Oğlanqala fortress, belongs to the 9-4 centuries of BC. The fortress walls of the settlement which is stored up to now, was built at the beginning of the 1st millennium of BC and have been used till the ancient period.
