= Godin Tepe =

Archaeological site in Iran

Godin Tepe گودین تپه
- Location within Iran
- 34°31′00″N 48°04′00″E
- Type: settlement
- Periods: Neolithic, Late Chalcolithic, Early Bronze Age, Iron Age
- Location: Kermanshah Province, Iran

History
- Built: Late 6th millennium BC

Site notes
- Excavation dates: 1965, 1967, 1969, 1971, 1973
- Archaeologists: T. Cuyler Young Jr
- Condition: Ruined
- Owner: Public
- Public access: Yes

Iran National Heritage List
- Official name: Godin Tepe
- Type: Mound
- Designated: 1965
- Reference no.: 488
- Conservation organization: Cultural Heritage, Handicrafts and Tourism Organization of Iran

Godin Tepe (Persian: گودین‌تپه) is an archaeological site in the Luristan region of western Iran, located in the valley of Kangavar in Kermanshah province. It lies on the left bank of the Gamas Āb river. The importance of the site may have been due to its role as a trading outpost in the early Mesopotamian trade networks. The site was occupied from the Late Chalcolithic period through the end of the 2nd millennium BC when it was destroyed in an earthquake and abandoned. The site was again settled in the 1st millennium BC Iron Age with the construction of sizable buildings.

== History ==
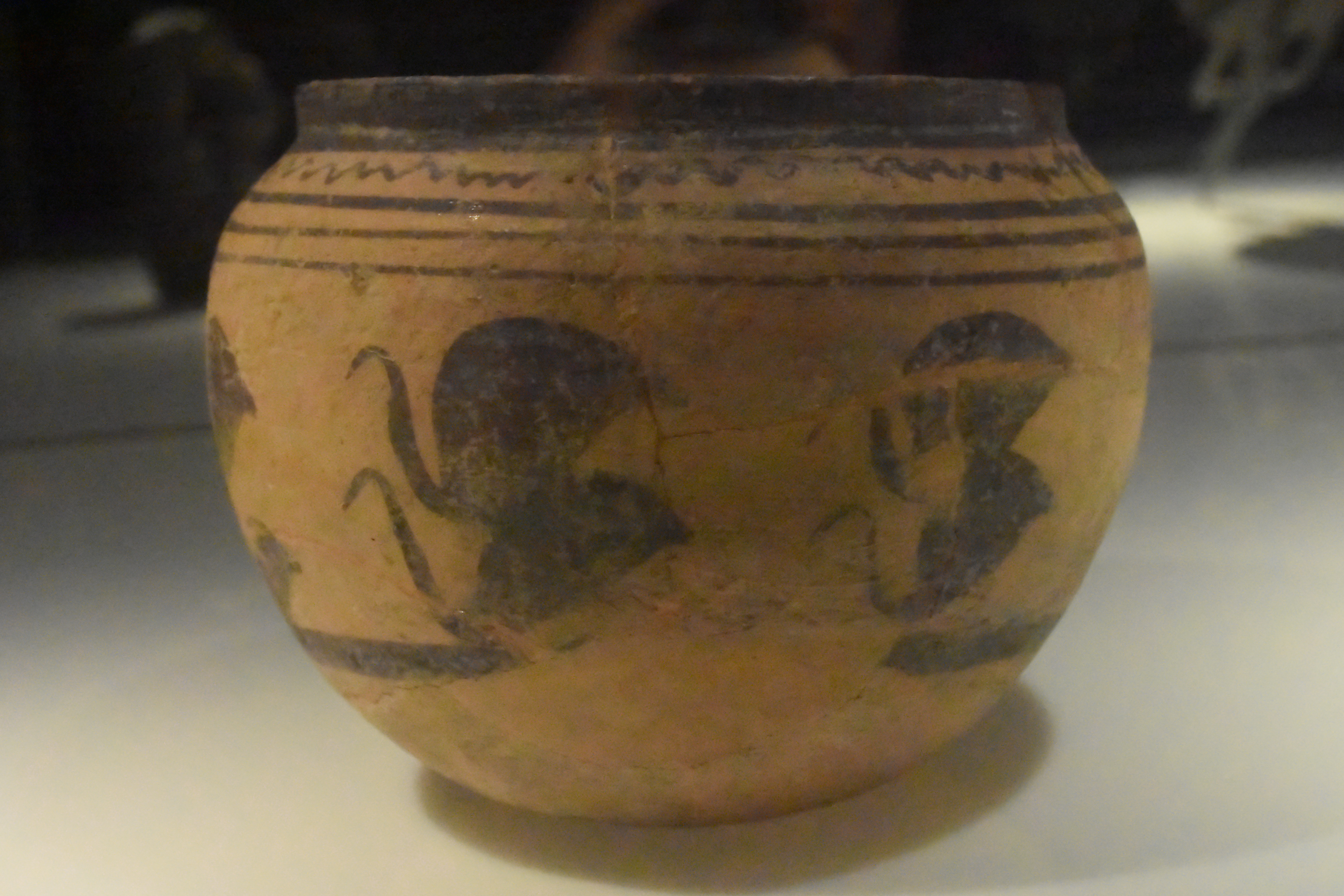
Ceramic bowl with painted decoration from Godin Tepe Level III

The earliest evidence for occupation at Godin comes from Periods XI through VII, spanning the Early and Middle Chalcolithic. The site was already inhabited as early as c. 5200 BC.

Because Godin has such a deep stratigraphy, it was decided that a related site of Seh Gabi nearby should also be studied. Seh Gabi is located 6 km northeast of Godin Tepe in the Kangavar valley. The deeper levels were easier to reach there.

Originally, the excavations at Godin concentrated on levels II (ended c. 500 BC?) to VI.I (c. 3200 BC–3000 BC), but the transition from the Neolithic to Chalcolithic was studied primarily at Seh Gabi.

The earliest pottery found was of the painted pottery traditions, including J ware (Godin pre-XI) related to Halaf culture pottery. The impressed Dalma ware (Dalma Tepe) (Godin XI/X) is very similar to the pottery traditions from the highlands north of Godin, especially from the area of Lake Urmia. Nadali Beig (Nad Ali Beig) is another prehistoric site located to the northwest of Godin in this Kangavar area. It also features Dalma pottery.

=== Level VIII ===
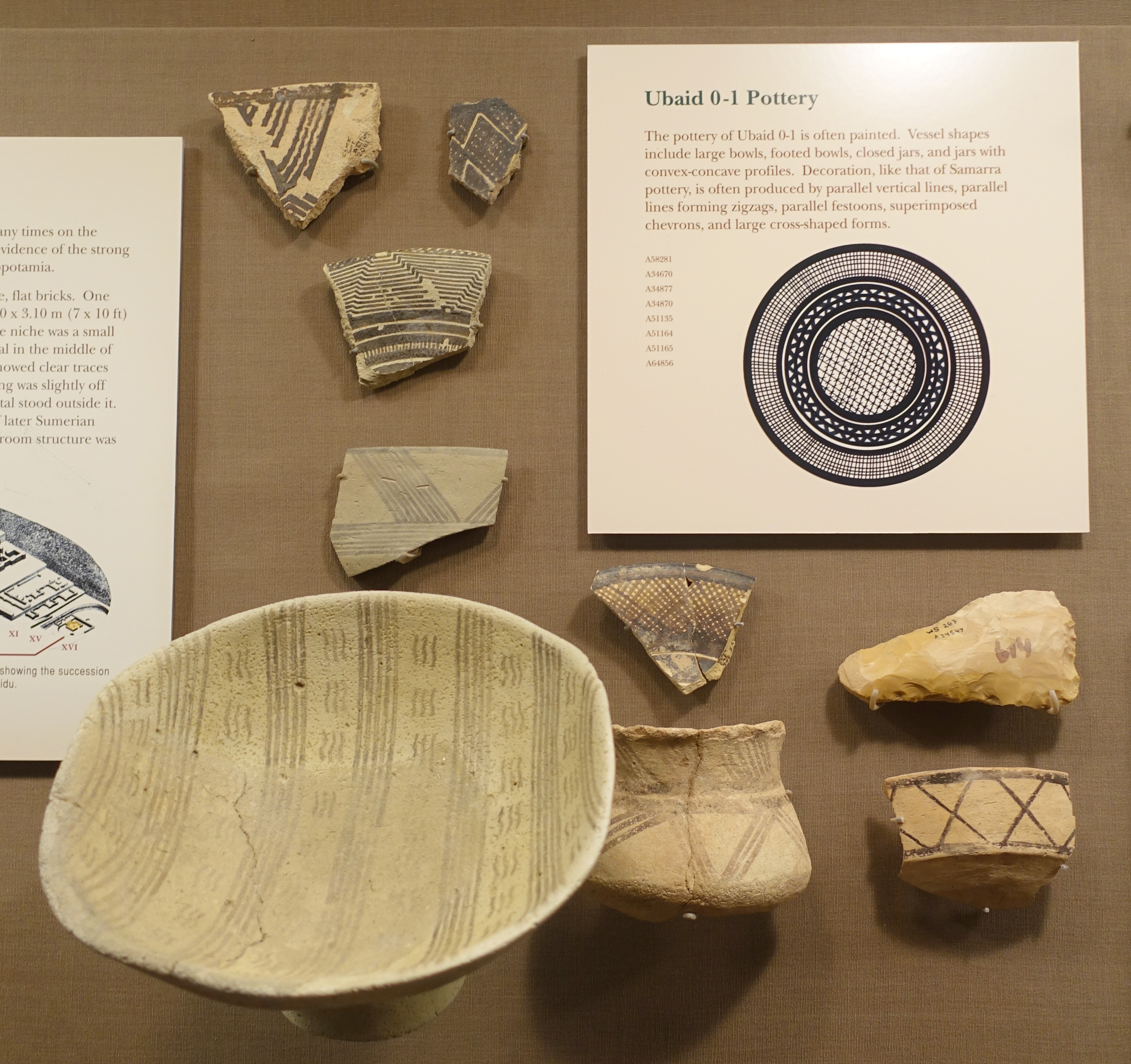
Ubaid pottery (Ubaid 0-1 levels) at the Oriental Institute Museum, Chicago

Level VIII is dated c. 4200–4000 BC, contemporary with Terminal Ubaid period. During the Late Chalcolithic 1 period (LC 1), some substantial trading networks emerged in the area for trade in metals, and in precious or semi-precious stones,

"During the time of Godin VIII, the LC 1, a real increase in the movement of these goods is evident across the region. For example, lapis lazuli, a semi-precious blue stone known to occur naturally only in the Badakshan area of northeastern Afghanistan, began to appear in LC1 sites in significant amounts."

=== Level VI/VI.I ===
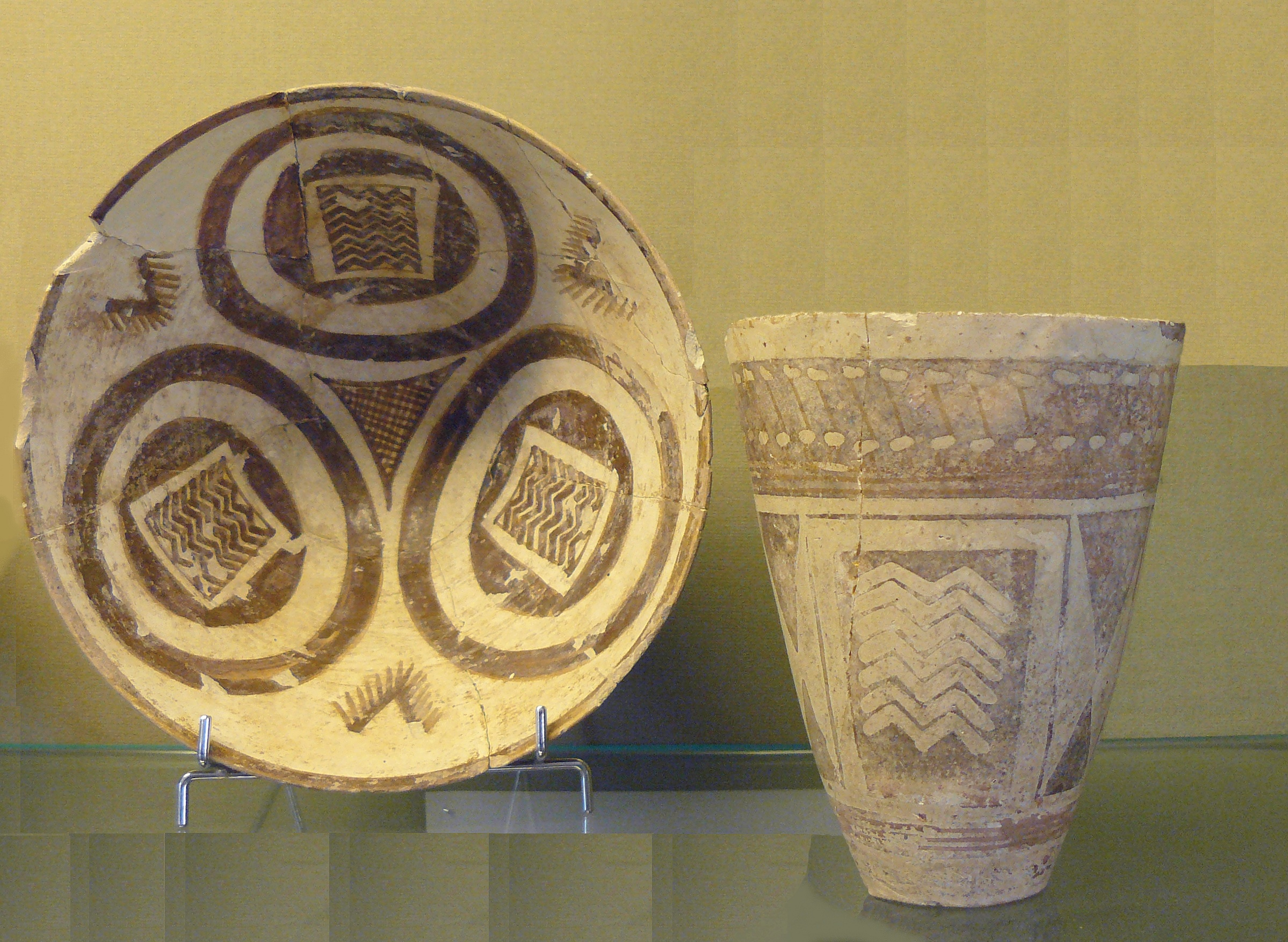
Goblet and cup, Iran, from Susa, 4th millennium BC - Ubaid period; goblet height c. 12 cm; Sèvres – Cité de la céramique, France

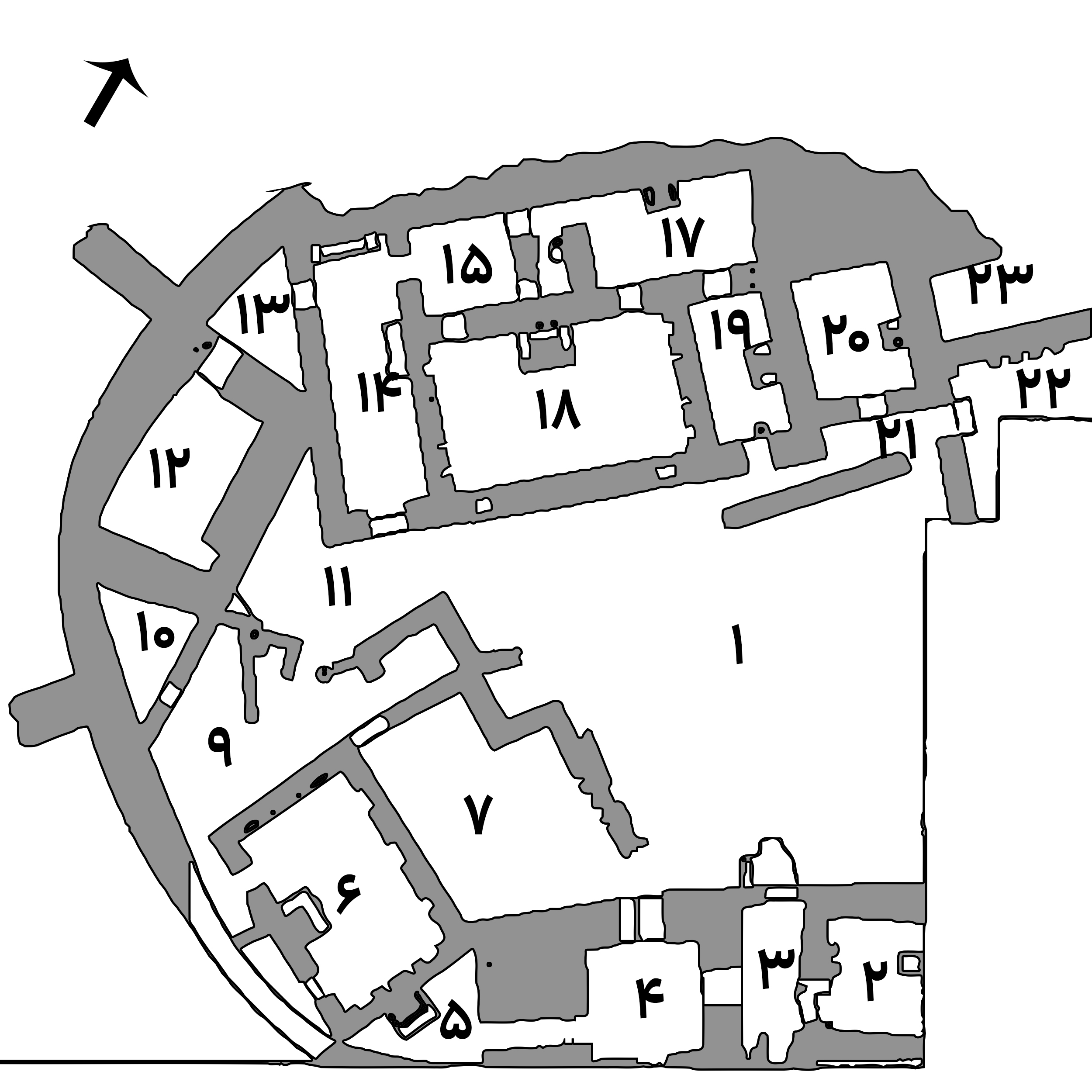
Archaeological plan of Godin Tepe V settlement

During the 1973 campaign, level VI.I (earlier called Level V) was excavated through a deep cut from the citadel. It was occupied during the period 3200–3000 BC. At the end of level VI.I there was a clear gap in the settlement sequence. There were signs of fire, such as room 22 whose roof was burned. The houses were in general well-preserved and contained many artifacts, but objects made of the precious metal were lacking. Just prior to that, in the final phases of Level VI a large architectural feature dubbed the "Oval Enclosure", encompassing an area of 560 square meters, was uncovered, burnt and destroyed c. 3000 BC. A massive number of sling bullets were found in the destruction debris, associated with a macehead and metal spear. Arsenical bronze objects were also found. Eight radiocarbon samples (IntCal04 calibration curve) from Level VI give dates ranging from 3490 BC to 3050 BC. Recently a researcher has re-interpreted the original excavation records in an attempt to reframe the Level VI.I occupation, contending that the "oval enclosure" did not exist and positing a more proto-Elamite influence versus the standard Uruk Expansion view.

The pottery of level VI.I show influences from the Uruk culture, with parallels at Susa, Uruk (IV) and Nippur Numerous Uruk period beveled rim bowls were found at Godin Tepe, primarily around the administrative building at the top of the mound, but not the "Grobe Blumentopfe" pots that became more common late in the Uruk period. The existence of Elamite trading posts at the site during this period, established by merchants from Susa has been suggested.

Thirteen seal impressions and two cylinder seals were found at level VI.I. They were thought to have been produced locally, based on the discovery of an uncarved cylinder. The seal impressions show a parallel with Uruk, Susa and other sites in Khuzestan. They were partly decorated with drill holes. Steatite served as raw material for these, sometimes treated with tempering.

At level VI.I (dated by the excavator to c. 3500-3200 BC) 38 clay tablets of the "numerical tablets" or "impressed tablets" type from the Uruk V period were found of which 27 were preserved in one piece. They contained primarily accounts, like those discovered at contemporary Uruk period sites in western Iran, Syria, and Mesopotamia. Seven of the tablets are sealed.

==== Early wine-making ====
Traces of wine and beer found in two ceramic jars (60 centimeters high with a capacity of 30 liters and a small hole drilled 10 centimeters above the base) dated to c. 3100–2900 BC and along with the findings at Hajji Firuz Tepe, provide evidence of the early production of those beverages in the Zagros Mountains. The jars were found in a small room with a necklace made of 200 black and white beads. SImilar jars were found in an adjacent room. The wine residue was identified using Diffuse-reflectance FT-IR. Some Kura–Araxes culture potsherds also seem to appear in association with wine making.

=== Level IV ===
Level IV (c. 3000–2650 BC), possibly after a hiatus in occupation, is thought to represent an influx of the northern Yanik-culture (or "Transcaucasian Early Bronze I culture", also known as Kura–Araxes culture), well known from Yanik Tepe, Iran, near Lake Urmia. A few Kura-Araxes potsherds were found in yet deeper layers going back to late fourth millennium BC (Level VI.I).) Unlike pottery from the previous or subsequent levels the pottery in this level were grog tempered.

The only notable architectural remains of this period consist of a number of plastered hearths. The excavator defined three main groups of pottery for Level IV with one, Fine Ware, being rare. Two of these groups belong to Transcaucasian Early Bronze Age Culture. One of these groups bears two types of coarse ware tempered with coarse grit. One of these types is characterized by a grey-black burnished surface mostly with contrasting colors in the interior and exterior of the vessels. This type of coarse ware was used for producing bowls entirely. Conical bowls decorated with incised and excised designs are common; the incised designs are occasionally filled with a whitish paste. The second type of coarse ware is lighter in color, often tan or pinkish buff. The surface of the vessels is either burnished or plain. Besides bowls there are jars with protruding rims and concave or recessed necks.

The second group of Transcaucasian Pottery found at Godin Tepe was classified as Common Ware. The fabric of this group was tempered by medium-fine grit and was not well-fired. This group of pottery has the same color range like the coarse ware. The surfaces are highly burnished though the vessels with a light interior and dark exterior are predominant. The forms consist entirely of cups, including the recessed neck types. The decoration is similar in style and technique to the previous coarse wares, but the excised designs are less common.

=== Level III ===
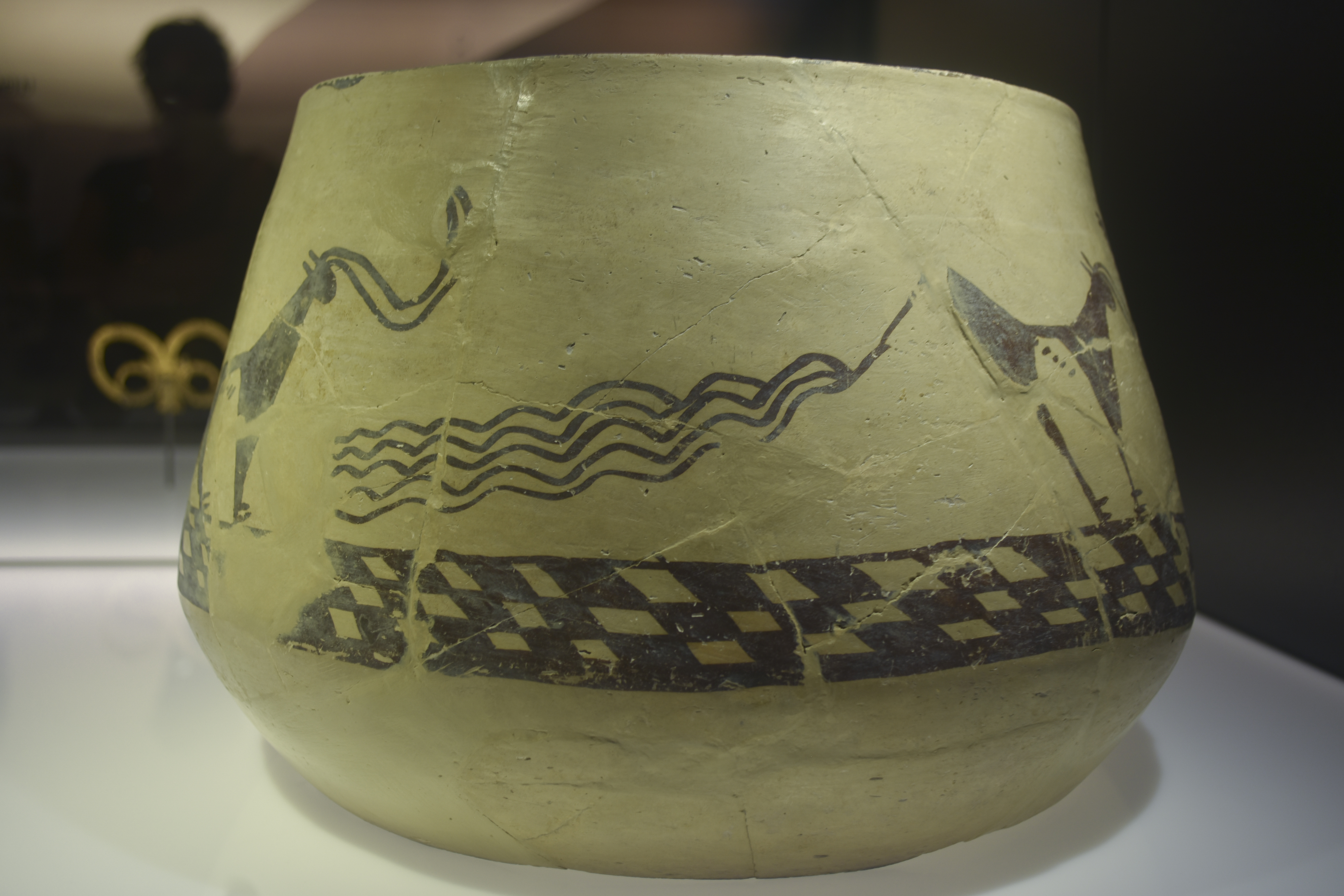
Vessel with painted decoration from Godin Tepe, Iran. Ca. 1450–1150 BC

Level III (c. 2600–1500/1400 BC) shows connections with Susa and most of Luristan, and it has been suggested that it belonged to the Elamite confederacy. A pottery link to Lagash has been established which may affect the chronology of this layer. Near 1400 BC, Godin Tepe was abandoned and was not re-occupied until c. 750 BC. Metal finds include one arrowhead, bracelets, finger and hair rings, and amulets. The pottery assemblage has allowed archaeologists to subdivide this level (Sublevels 1 and 3 are transitory and ephemeral):

- Gödin III : 6 - 2600-2300 BC - Early Dynastic III/IV
- Gödin III : 5 - 2300-2100 BC - Akkafian
- Gödin III : 4 - 2100-1900 BC - Ur III / Isin-Larsa
- Gödin III : 2 - 1900-1600 BC

=== Level II ===
When Godin Tepe was re-occupied, c. 750 BC, a 120 meter by 50 meter three meter thick fortification wall was constructed, complete with arrow slits. This wall gradually fell into disuse. A large, 24 meter by 28 meter interior dimension, columned hall was constructed using 30 wooden columns arranged in five rows of six. The interior was plastered and featured a raised area along the northwest wall. A number of subsidiary mudbrick buildings were also constructed for supporting functions like food preparation and storage. Given the lack of military trappings the excavators viewed the building as likely a "palace" or "manor house" for some powerful local figure.

The Level II pottery (only wheel-made micaceous buff ware) have strong parallels with Iron Age sites as Bābā Jān Tepe(I), Jameh Shuran (IIa), Tepe Nush-i Jan and Pasargadae.

Godin was again abandoned during the 6th century BC, perhaps as a result or in anticipation of the expansion of Cyrus the Great (c. 550 BC) (Brown 1990) or due to the interruption of a social stratification and secondary State formation process after the fall of Assyria.

=== Level I ===
A late, Islamic shrine (c. 15th century).

== Archaeology ==
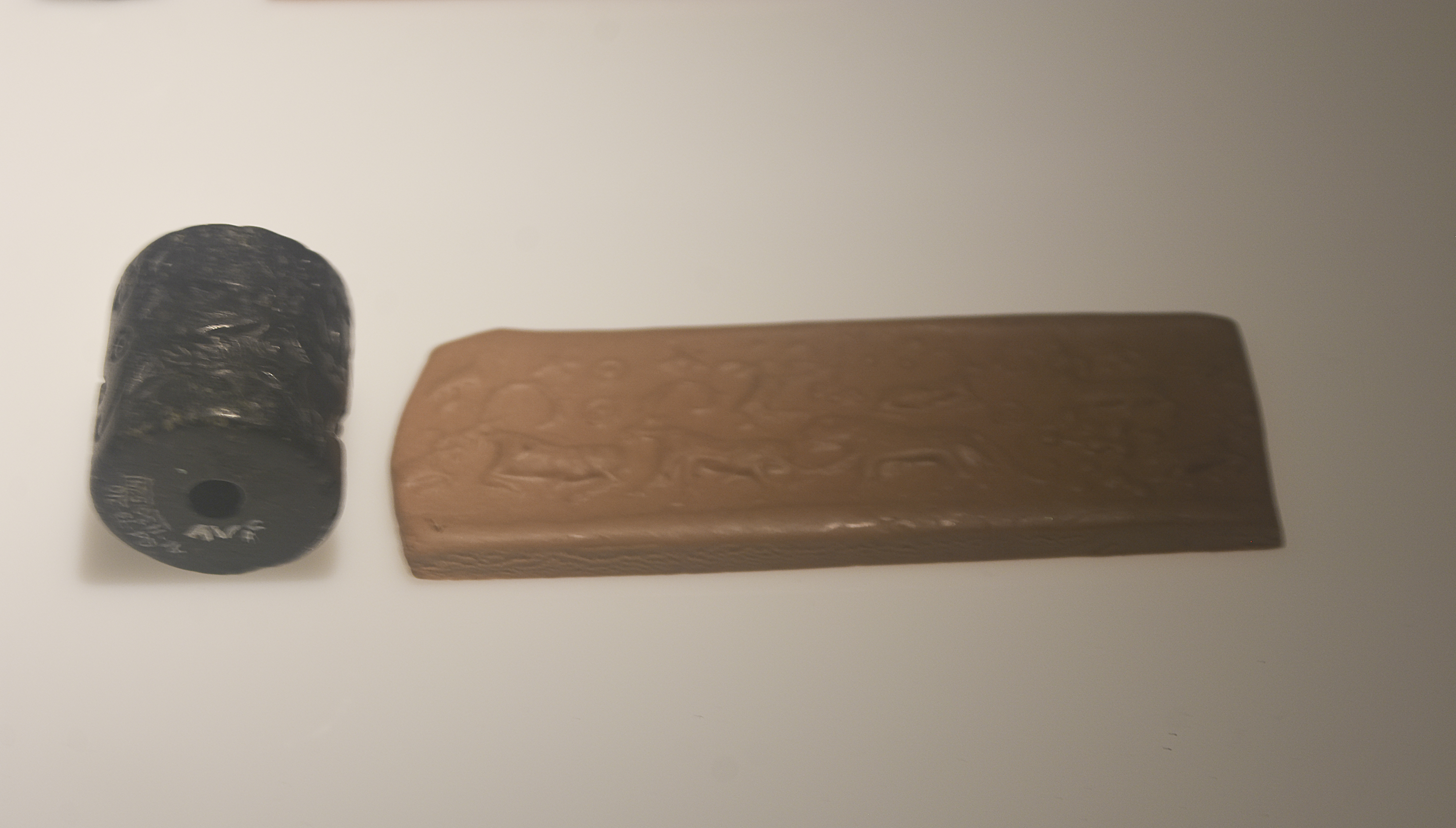
Cylinder seal. Ca. 3200-3000 BC. Provenance: Godin Tepe

The site covers an area of about 15 hectares, originally larger but the northern end of the mound has now eroded to a cliff, and rises 30 meters above the plain. It is divided into an Outer Town to the south which has only a slight elevation, an Upper Citadel, and a Citadel. The Citadel has been eroded by gullies at the southeast and southwest corners and is pitted by removal material for brick making and that for agricultural soil..The Outer Town has been partially robbed out by locals for agricultural soil and has an extensive Islamic cemetery on the southeast side. A modern road cuts across the southern portion. Godin Tepe was discovered during a regional survey in 1961. The site was first excavated in a small excavation in 1965 by a Canadian expedition headed by T. Cuyler Young Jr. and sponsored by the Royal Ontario Museum. Two trenches were opened on the Upper Citadel, one trench was opened on the Citadel, and four graves (period III) were excavated on the Outer Town. Work continued in 1967, 1969, 1971, and 1973.

== See also ==
- Chogha Gavaneh
- List of cities of the ancient Near East
