= Bābā Jān Tepe =

Babajan باباجان
- Village
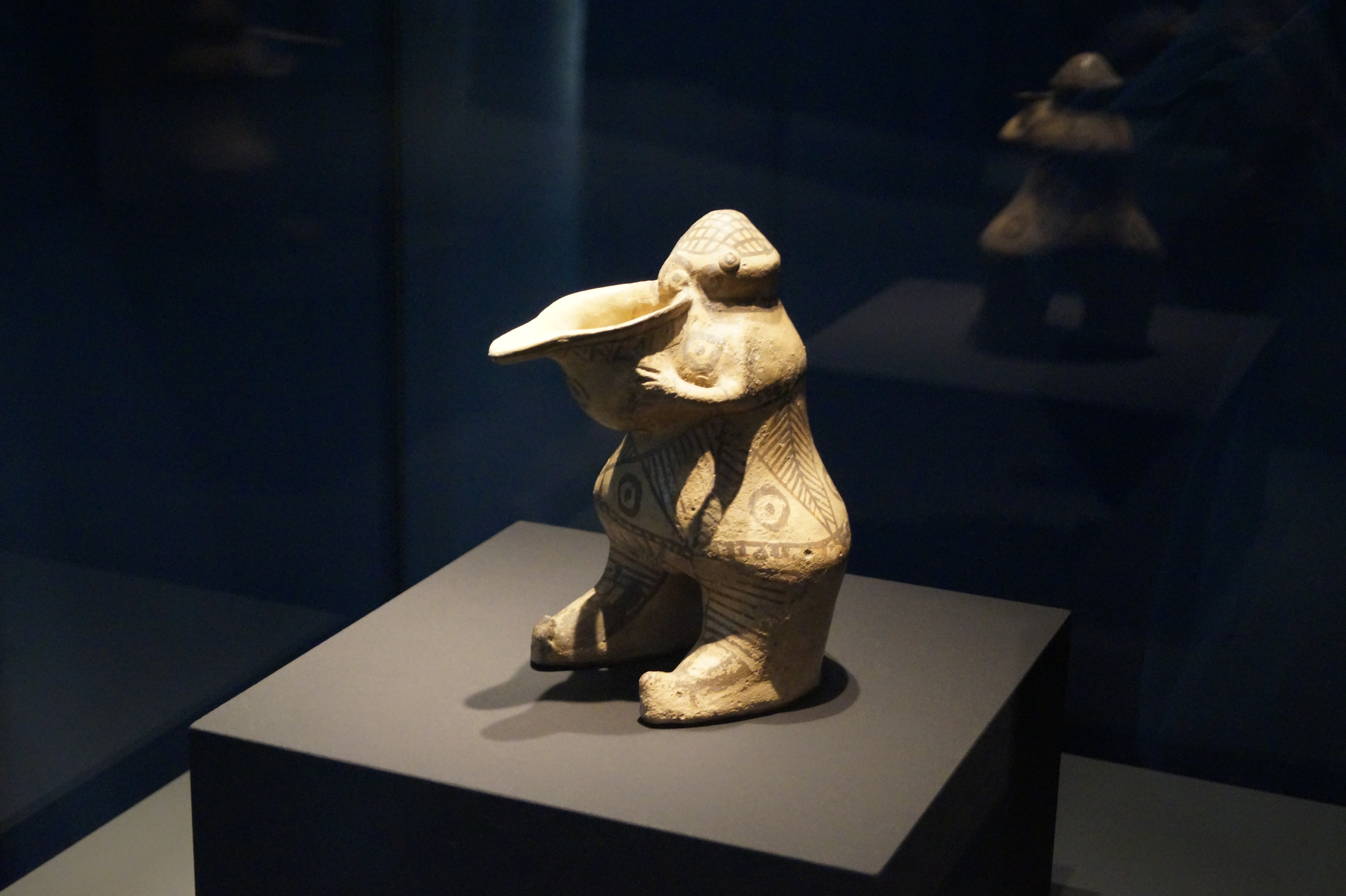
- Ancient pottery from Bābā Jān Tepe, around 750 BC

- Location within Iran
- Coordinates: 34°01′25″N 47°56′09″E
- Country: Iran
- Province: Lorestan
- County: Delfan
- Bakhsh: Central
- Rural District: Nurabad

Population (2006)
  - Total: 663
- Time zone: UTC+3:30 (IRST)
  - Summer (DST): UTC+4:30 (IRDT)

Bābā Jān Tepe (Tappa), an archeological site in north-eastern Lorestan province (34° north latitude, 47° 56' east longitude), on the southern edge of the Delfān plain at approximately 10 km from Nūrābād, important primarily for excavations of first-millennium BC levels conducted by C. Goff from 1966 to 1969. Work concentrated on two mounds joined by a saddle. The East Mound (85 m in diameter, 9 m high) yielded a series of first-millennium BC buildings (Baba Jan III-I) above Bronze Age (Baba Jan IV) graves. On the Central Mound (120 m in diameter, 15 m high), excavation concentrated on the Baba Jan III Manor on the summit; an 8 × 6 m Deep Sounding provides a partial late fourth- to mid-second-millennium BC sequence

== Archaeology ==
=== Baba Jan V ===
Levels 7–6 in the bottom 2 m of the Deep Sounding yielded late fourth-millennium BC chalcolithic pottery similar to Godin (Gowdīn) VI .

=== Baba Jan IV ===
In the Deep Sounding on the Central Mound, two levels of domestic architecture (level 5, 2300-2100 BC and level 4, 1800-1500 BC) were separated by a period of abandonment during which four burials were dug into the area. Four other Baba Jan IV graves were cut into virgin soil on the East Mound; these date to the late third (Goff, 1976, fig. 11.10-13, 16–18) and mid-second millennium BC. The assemblage is comparable to that of period III at Godin Tepe.

=== Baba Jan III ===
Baba Jan III. On the Central Mound only the superimposed foundations from two phases of a Manor (30 x 35 m) survive. The earlier, level 2, consisted of a rectangular court with a north–south axis flanked by long narrow rooms, the whole with towers both at the corners and midpoints of all sides. When rebuilt in level 1, the Manor consisted of a central columned hall (one row of three columns) surrounded by long narrow rooms. On the East Mound the almost 2,000 m2 excavation yielded the Fort and Painted Chamber. The excavated portion of the Fort, whose walls survived to a height of 3–4 m, consisted of a large (12 m2) room with four irregularly placed columns and surrounded by long rectangular chambers. A spiral ramp led either to a second story or the roof. Further rooms extended to the south. The Painted Chamber (10 x 12 m) unit was added at the east end of the Fort. This ceremonial hall, which opened southward onto an enclosed courtyard, had two columns, a niche and doorway with reveals, white walls decorated with red paint, and a painted-tile ceiling. The Fort and Painted Chamber were probably the seat of a local ruler. The extent and nature of the settlement are uncertain. Fire destroyed this complex at the end of the eighth century BC. The pottery evidence suggests that the East Mound buildings were built and used after the Central Mound Manors. The columned halls at Baba Jan are analogous to contemporary buildings of Hasanlu (Ḥasanlū) IV, Godin Tepe II, and Tepe Nush-i Jan (Nūš-e Jān).

Baba Jan III pottery, long known as Genre Luristan, was a handmade, turntable-finished buff ware with distinctive decoration in a thick red-brown matte paint. Typical motifs included ladders and pendant triangles with hatching or crosshatching. Common vessel shapes were simple: wide-bodied jars with narrow necks, small bowls with incurved rims and horizontal loop handles, conical bowls, and cups. A range of iron weapons and tools were found, but classic Luristan bronze artifacts were uncommon.

=== Baba Jan II ===
Baba Jan II. The walls of the ruined Fort remained standing until late in Baba Jan II; squatters briefly reoccupied the eastern rooms. While the eastern wall of the Fort remained standing, three phases of small structures were built in the area of the Painted Chamber and its courtyard.

The Genre Luristan pottery of Baba Jan III continued with simpler decoration, but small quantities of a new type of wheel-made buff pottery with small golden mica inclusions appeared. The most common shapes were deep bowls with a thickened rim and horizontal handle, double-handled jars, and jars with a vertical handle and tubular spout with trefoil-mouth. This ware and characteristic shapes are very similar to Tepe Nush i Jan level I (Malāyer plain). Baba Jan II probably dates to the seventh century BC.

=== Baba Jan I ===
Baba Jan I. On the East Mound poorly preserved village house walls covered the summit and extended down the east slope in a series of terraces. Superposition of architectural remains suggests two to three phases. The buff ware Baba Jan I assemblage, whose closest affinities are with Period II at Godin Tepe (Kangāvar valley), is characterized by numerous bowl forms and is a development from the wheelmade pottery of Baba Jan II. Baba Jan III wares disappear. Baba Jan I probably falls within the Achaemenid period.

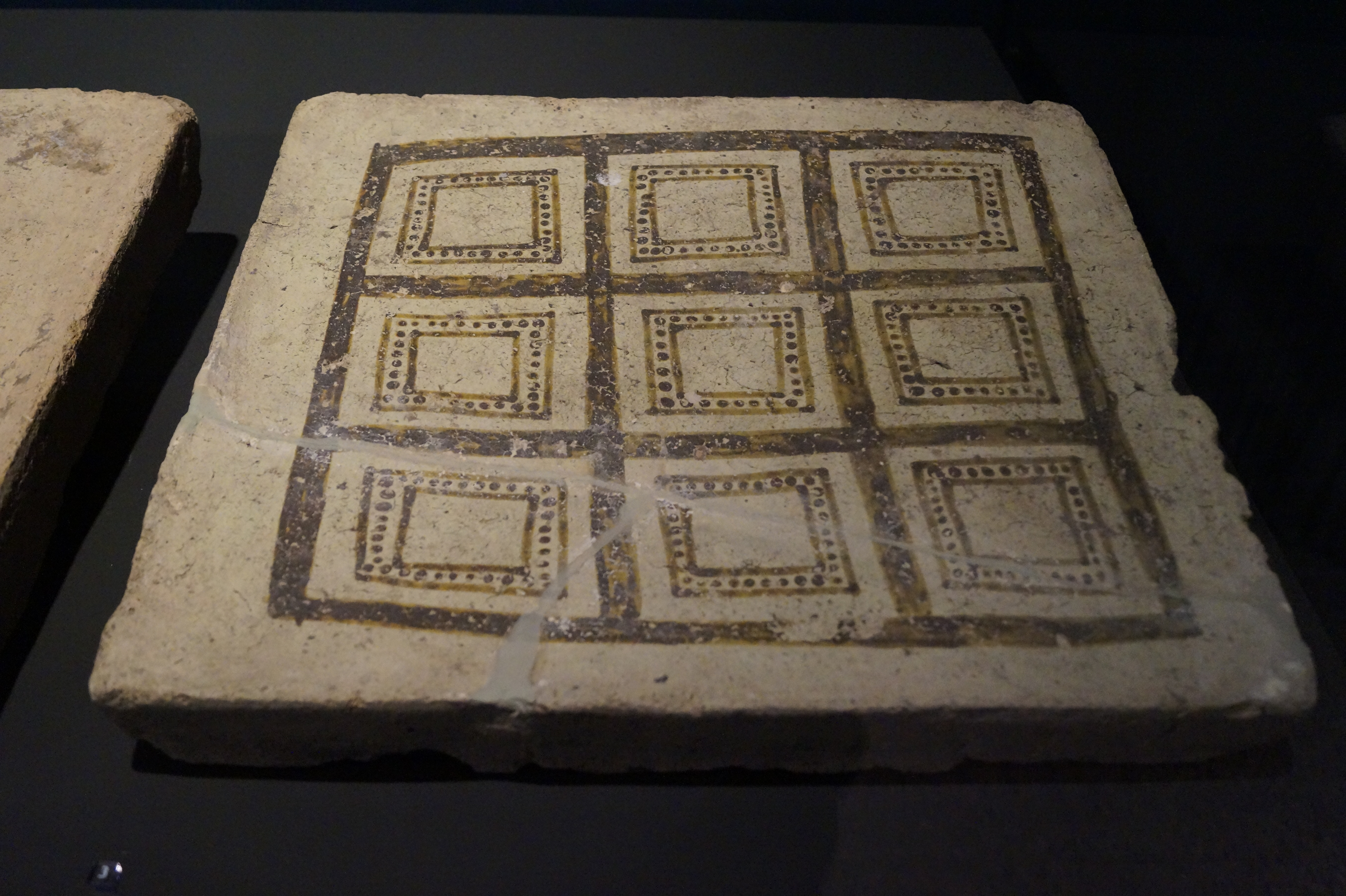
Architectural decoration, first millennium BC

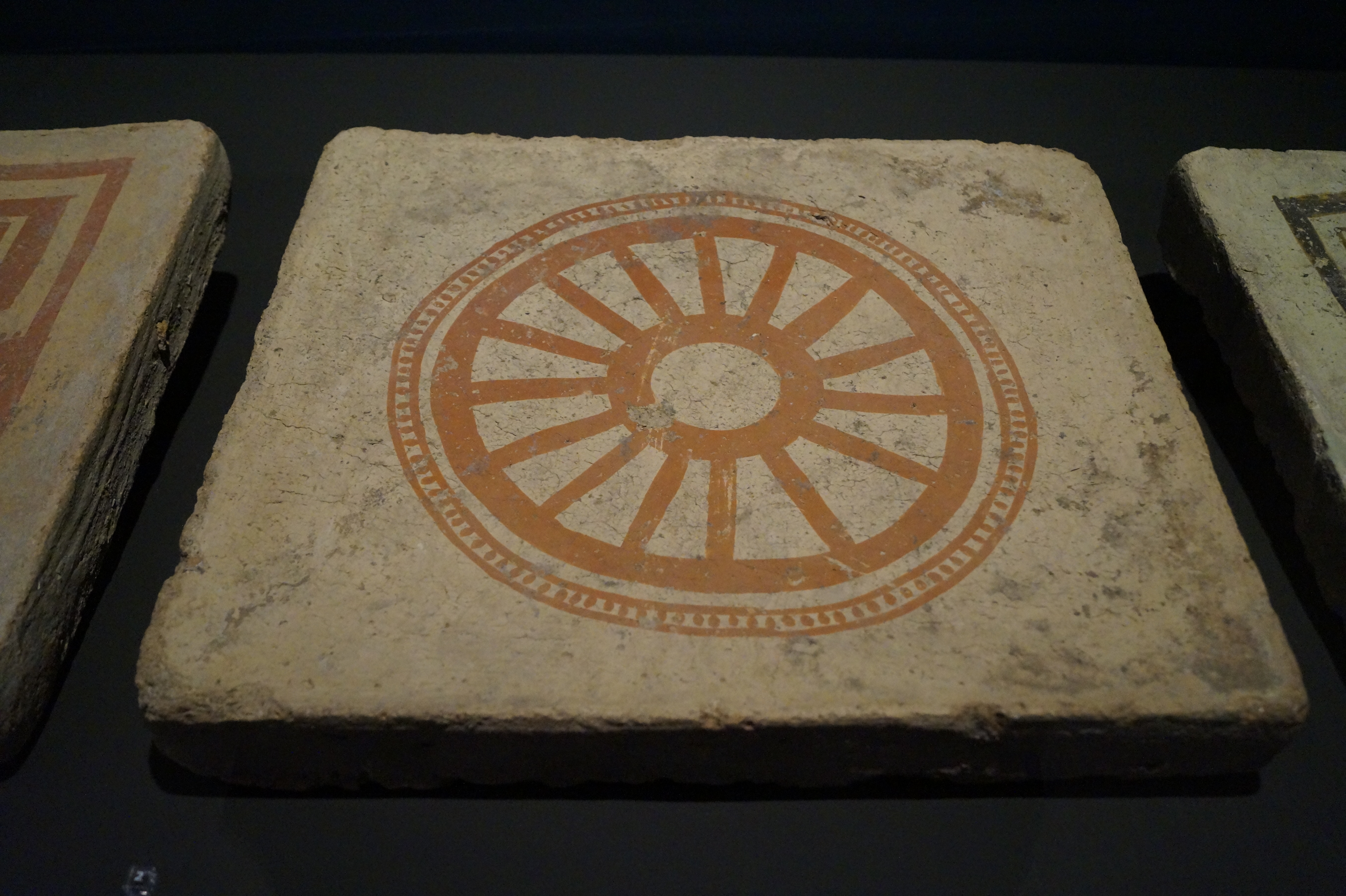
Architectural decoration, first millennium BC

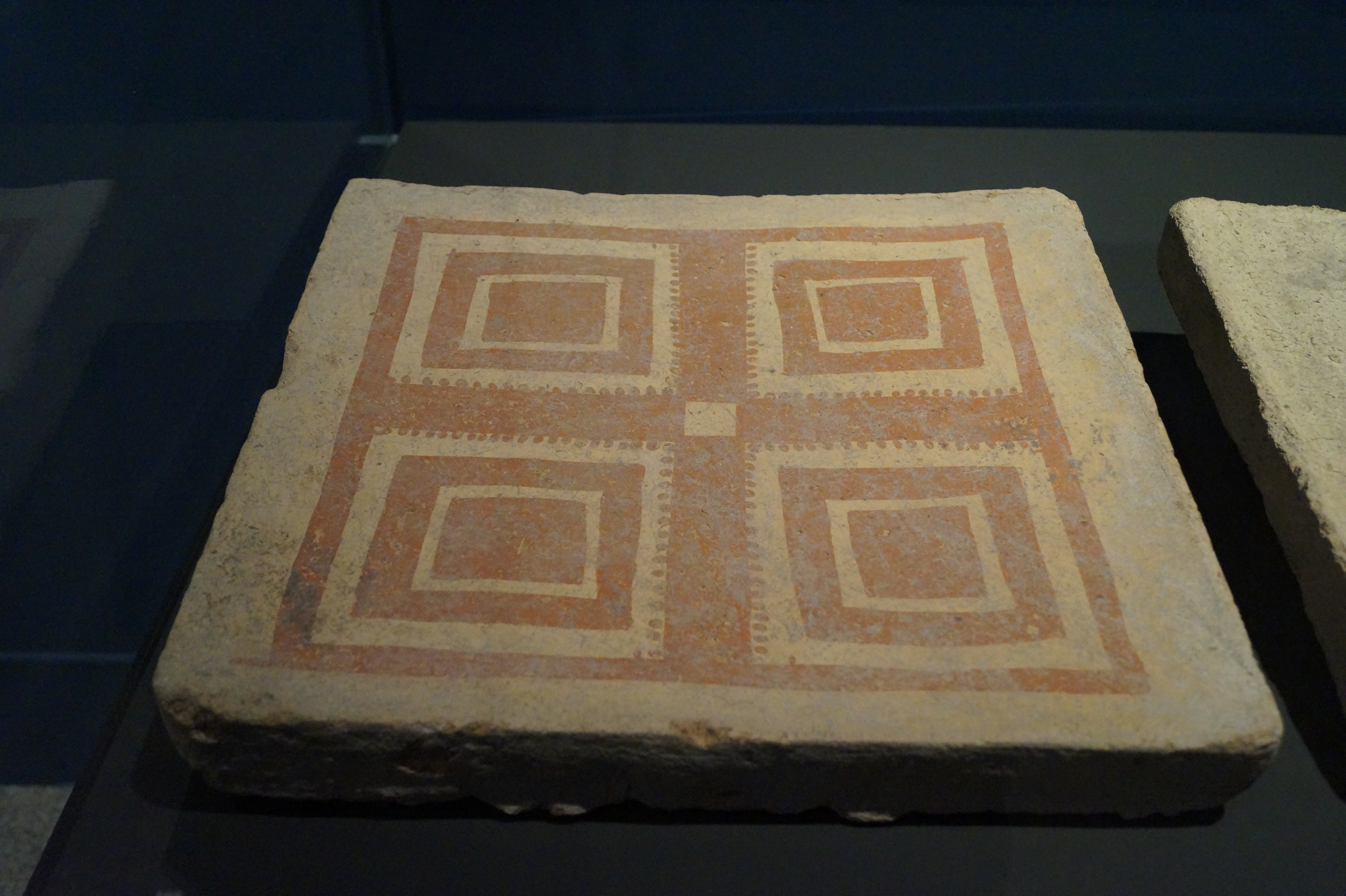
Architectural decoration, first millennium BC

== See also ==
- Cities of the Ancient Near East
- Tureng Tepe
- Surkh Dum-i-Luri
