= St. Hripsime Church (Kultepe) =

Armenian church in the Nakhchivan Autonomous Republic of Azerbaijan

- Սուրբ Հռիփսիմե եկեղեցի
- St. Hripsime Church
- Location: Kültəpə
- Country: Azerbaijan
- Denomination: Armenian Apostolic Church

History
- Status: destroyed
- Founded: 17th century

Architecture
- Demolished: 1997–2009

St. Hripsime Church was an Armenian church located in the village of Kultepe (Babek District) of the Nakhchivan Autonomous Republic of Azerbaijan. It was located in the center of the village.

== History ==
The church was founded in the 17th century and was renovated in the 19th century.

== Architecture ==
St. Hripsime was a four-aisled, three-naved basilica church with semicircular apse, vestries on either side, and an entryway in the north. There were Armenian inscriptions on the interior and sculptures around the entrance.

== Destruction ==
The church was still extant in the 1980s and was destroyed at some point between 1997 and October 24, 2009, as documented by Caucasus Heritage Watch.
