= Dalma Tepe =

Archaeological site in Naqadeh County, Iran

- دالما تپه (Persian)
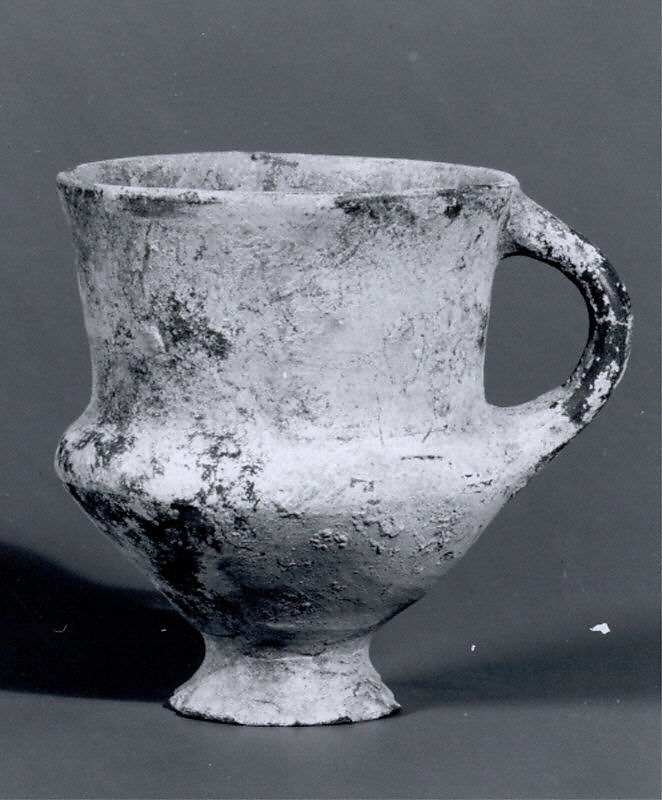
- Ceramic button-base cup excavated in Dalma Tepe

- Location within Iran
- 36°59′01.7″N 45°25′36.3″E
- Type: Settlement
- Periods: Chalcolithic
- Cultures: Dalma culture
- Location: West Azarbaijan, Iran

History
- Built: 5000-4000 BC

Dalma Tepe (Persian: دالما تپه) is an archaeological site about 2 km northeast of Naqadeh (formerly Solduz), Naqadeh County, in the Iranian province of West Azerbaijan. It is the type site of Dalma culture, a prehistoric culture of north-western Iran from the fifth millennium B.C.

== Location ==
Dalma Tepe is located at the southwestern end of Lake Urmia, north of the modern village of Dalma. There are two other small tells close by, including Agrab Tepe. Teppe Hasanlu site is about 5 km southwest of Dalma.

Dalma Tepe was inscribed on the national heritage list of Iran in 2006. In 2021, Archaeological survey again began at Dalma Tepe after a six-decade hiatus.

The mound rises approximately 4 meters above the surrounding plain. Its diameter measures approximately 50 meters. The site was researched in 1958 by Charles Burney and additionally in 1961 in collaboration with T. Cuyler Young Jr. as part of the Hasanlu Project of The University Museum of Archaeology and Anthropology of the University of Pennsylvania.

Large quantities of handmade, chaff-tempered pottery were found. This includes 'Dalma plain ware', 'Dalma impressed ware', and 'Dalma red-slipped ware', which was covered with a uniform coat of dark-red paint. There was a variety of shapes.

'Dalma painted ware' is decorated with large patterns of triangles in deep shades on red.

Conical clay spindle whorls were also found.

Dalma pottery represents Period IX at Ḥasanlū Tepe, and is dated to around 5000–4500 BCE. Links with Level XVI at Tepe Gawra have been identified, which, in northern Iraq, represents Ubaid 3 period.

Similar pottery has been found at Seh Gābī and Godin Tepe, attributed to Period X. Kul Tepe Jolfa is another related site from the same period. It is located north of Lake Urmia.

In 2013, nine ancient sites containing Dalma sherds have been identified in the Songhor and Koliyaei Plains in Central Zagros.

== Ceramics ==
Dalma pottery, which corresponds to the Hasanlu IX layer, could be found in various places around Lake Urmia. Very similar contemporary ceramics were excavated at Tepe Seavan (Sīāvān) in the Margavar Valley. Godin Tepe and nearby Seh Gabi also had similar ceramics. Using 14 C dating and other comparisons, the origin can be dated to around the 5th millennium BC date. Ceramic items from Tepe Gawra (northern Iraq) were also found at Dalmā Tepe.

According to Bahranipoor (2021), four geographical sub-regions of this tradition can be suggested,

- "... south of Lake Urmia (the sites Dalma, Baghi and Lavin),
- Kangavar (Godin, Seh Gabi B and Nadali Beig),
- Bijar (Gheshlagh) and
- Kurdestan (Namshir)."

== Bibliography ==
- DALMĀ TEPE - iranicaonline.org
