= Ovçular Tepesi =

Ancient settlement in Dizə, Sharur, Azerbaijan

Coordinates: 39.5923°N 45.0678°E

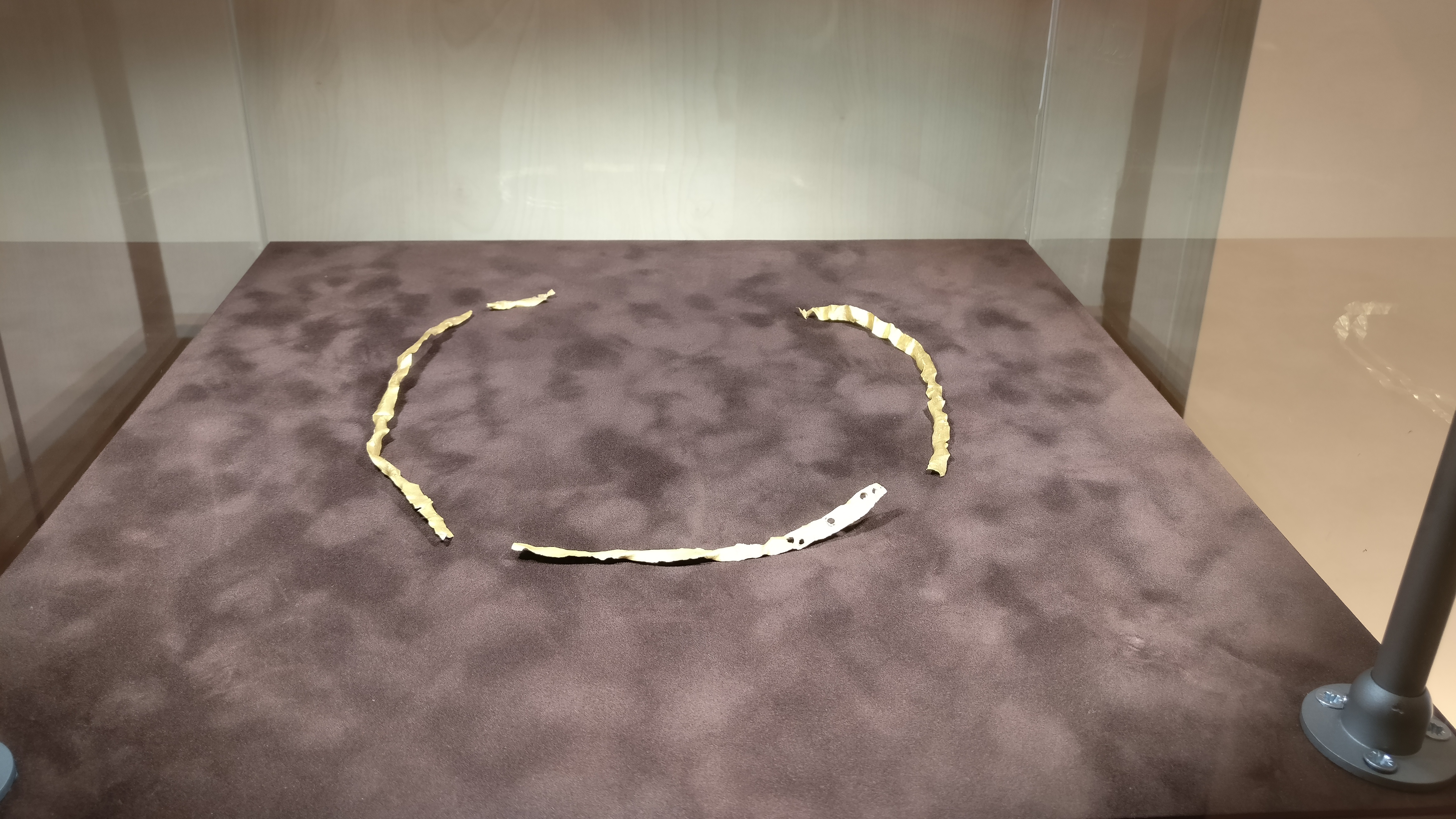
A gold necklace from Ovçular tepe, the oldest jewelry piece of the South Caucasus. Exhibit at Heydar Aliyev Center, Baku, 2018

Ovçular Tepesi is an ancient settlement located at the northern end of Dizə, Sharur village in Sharur District of Azerbaijan, on the left bank of Arpa (river). It dates back to the fifth millennium BC, and continued to the third millenniums BC.

== Location ==
This is a strategic point at the foot of the highlands; the site is at the crossroads of major trade routes linking the Iranian plateau to Anatolia (east to west), and the Caucasus to North Mesopotamia (north to south).

The monument is located on a natural hill. The area of the monument is about 10 hectares. The characteristic feature of the site is that the Kura-Araxes layer is not covered by any cultural layers of later periods.

== Excavations ==
First excavation campaigns at the site were conducted by Seyidov in 1980, and then later by Aliyev. Also Ashurov investigated the site in 2001.

During the period of 2006–2011, a joint Azerbaijani-French expedition conducted a survey of the site. The residents engaged in agriculture, cattle breeding, fishing, and other farming activities.

In 2010, some Ubaid period materials were found.

Discovered archaeological materials are similar to Kultepe, Azerbaijan, Makhta Kultepe and other Chalcolithic era monuments.

According to Catherine Marro (2022), Ovcular represented an earlier development of the Leyla Tepe (Leyla-Tepe culture) ceramics going back to 4400-3900 BC. This is in line with the contemporary pottery of Beyuk Kesik (Böyük Kesik), another Leyla Tepe site located in the Kura basin.

Also, the site of Ucan Agil presents considerable parallels with Ovcular. According to Marro, the Late Chalcolithic ceramic repertoire of Ucan Agil is mostly chaff-tempered and chaff-faced. It is similar in many respects to Ovcular, but represents a slightly earlier version of it. Also, some Ucan Agil ceramic shapes, and other features, are unknown in the Ovçular Tepesi repertoire, and are probably earlier.

== Metallurgy ==
At Ovcular, three large copper axes were found in an infant burial jar, coming from Late Chalcolithic occupation levels (4400–3950 BC). Also, pieces of copper ore, crucible remains, and some small metal artifacts were found. Such large copper tools are not known anywhere else in southwestern Asia. Metallurgy was being practiced here, and at other sites in the area.

== Oldest necklace ==
The gold necklace of the Eneolithic/Chalcolithic period was discovered in 2008 near the village of Dize, Sharur district of Nakhchivan Autonomous Republic during archaeological excavations in the ancient settlement of Ovçular Təpəsi (the Hunters Hill). The necklace is the oldest piece of jewellery found in the South Caucasus. Prior to this discovery, the most ancient gold jewellery piece in the South Caucasus was discovered during excavations in Georgia and was considered as an item of the early Bronze Age era. It is now exhibited at Heydar Aliyev Center in Baku.

== See also ==
- Kultepe, Azerbaijan
- History of Azerbaijan

== Bibliography ==
- "Abbas Seyidov - Nahchivan in the Bronze Age, Baku, "Elm", 2000". Archived from the original on 2011-12-02.
- Nicolas Gailhard, Michael Bode, Veli Bakhshaliyev and Catherine Marro (2021), The invisible movements of metallurgy: the interactions between nomads and metal - Some evidence from Nakhchivan (Azerbaijan) during the Chalcolithic and the Early Bronze Age. in - ON SALT, COPPER AND GOLD. Catherine Marro, Thomas Stöllner eds.
