= Uzun oba =

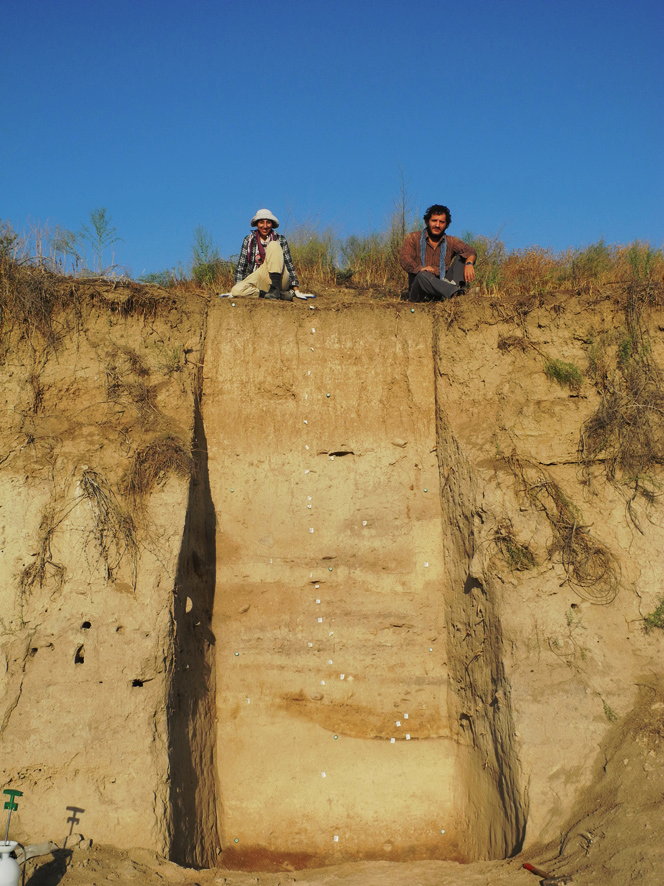
Uzun oba strafigraphic cut

Uzun Oba is an archaeological excavation site in Azerbaijan. It is located on the right bank of the Nakhchivançay near the village of Aşağı Uzunoba in the Babək district.

== Description ==
The site was investigated during excavations of the international archaeological expedition Azerbaijan-France in 2015. Vali Baxşəliyev and Catherine Marro were the leaders of the expedition. The stratigraphic cut from 2 to 5 m deep was preserved during the excavation on the eastern slope of the site at 2 m high. During the excavation, painted ceramic pieces from the V millennium BC came to light. Such ancient finds are very rare for the region.
