= Didivar =

- Municipality
- Location within Azerbaijan
- Coordinates: 39°18′18″N 45°26′02″E
- Country: Azerbaijan
- Autonomous republic: Nakhchivan
- District: Babek

Population (2005)
  - Total: 1,318
- Time zone: UTC+4 (AZT)

Didivar (also, Diduvar) is a village and municipality in the Babek District of Nakhchivan, Azerbaijan. It is located in the near of the Nakhchivan-Shahbuz highway, 12 km in the north from the district center, on the junction area of the Jahrichay and Nakhchivanchay Rivers. Its population is busy with grain growing, vegetable-growing and animal husbandry. There are secondary school, culture house, library, club, mosque and a medical center in the village. It has a population of 1,318.

== Historical and archaeological monuments ==
=== Didivar ===
Didivar - is the settlement of the Bronze and early Iron Ages in the north-east of the same named village of the Babek district. The area is 5 ha; the main part has been left under the modern houses of the village. Research works was carried out in 1978. The thickness of cultural layer is 3 m. Cultural layer is contents from the clay mixed with ash. The remains of the building were found from here. From the place of residence have been found a considerable amount of clay pots decorated with geometric patterns, fragments of painted plates, graters, items of pestle and tuft. The findings are belongs to the 2-1 millennium BC.

=== Didivar Necropolis ===
Didivar Necropolis - the monument of the Bronze Age in the east of the same named village in the Babak rayon. Wasn't carried out the extensive research works. From here, were discovered the samples of the painted clay pot in red colored decorated with black color ornaments. It is supposed that the monument approximately, belongs to the 3-2 millennium BC.

== See also ==
- Kultepe, Azerbaijan
