= Kültəpə =

Village and municipality in Nakhchivan, Azerbaijan

- Municipality
- Location within Azerbaijan
- Coordinates: 39°16′13″N 45°27′07″E
- Country: Azerbaijan
- Autonomous republic: Nakhchivan
- District: Babek

Population
  - Total: 1,859
- Time zone: UTC+4 (AZT)

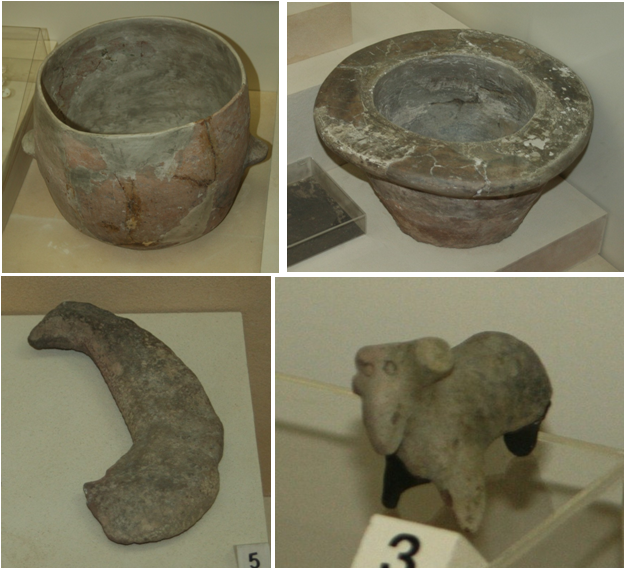
Artifacts from Kultepe I

Kültəpə (also rendered as Kultepe, Aşağı Gültəpə, Gültəpə, Kyul'tepe, Kul'tepe, and Kultepe-1) is a settlement dating from the Neolithic, a village and municipality in the Babek District of Nakhchivan, Azerbaijan. It has a population of 1,859.

== Research ==
In 1951, archeologist Osman Habibulla began excavation in the settlement, clarifying the stratigraphy and cultural strata of the area. The tell was much disturbed in the past.

As excavators had found, the town features a cultural layer with the total depth of 22 m. The earliest 9 m of this belongs to the Neolithic. Some Halaf culture artifacts have been found.

In the Eneolithic layer the excavators discovered remains of buildings, as well as burial places. These buildings were round as well as rectangular-shaped, and were made of mudbrick. The diameter of the round constructions was around 6–8 meters. The rectangular ones are about 15 sq. m in size. These structures were typically connected with agriculture.

85 burial places were investigated in the Eneolithic layer. In 31 of those excavators found pottery dishes, items made of bones and stone, and beads.

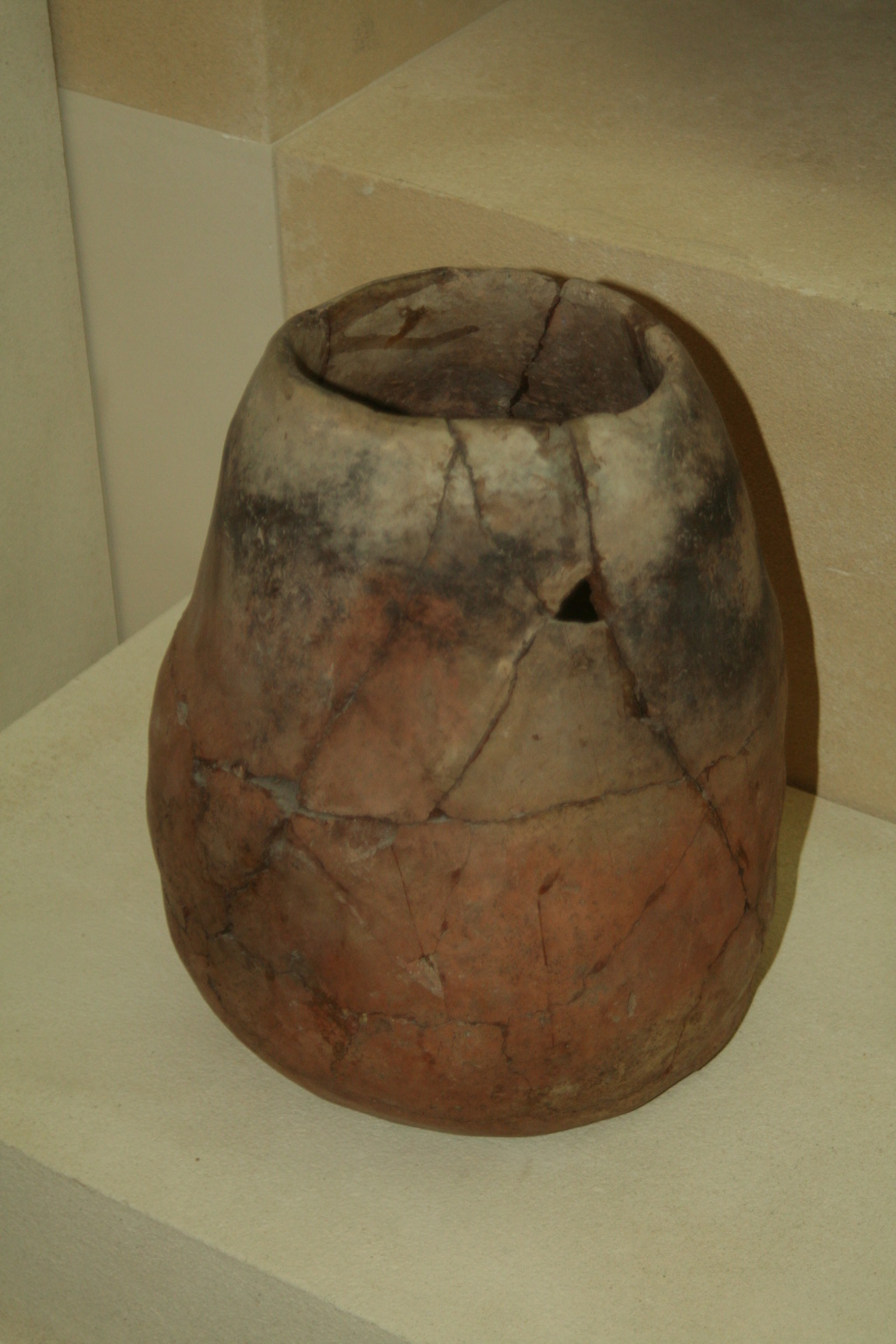
Earthenware vessel from Kultepe I

On top of that are the remains of the Bronze Age, and then the Early Iron Age.

At each of these layers a variety of artifacts were found: pottery dishes, cattle-breeding and agricultural implements, adornments, weapons etc.

According to recent research (2019), the data from Kültepe I and the nearby Kültepe II indicate that "the adoption of a productive economy in the South Caucasus probably results from several events, including the migrations of peoples from Iran and Mesopotamia". In regard to Kura–Araxes culture in the last quarter of the 4th millennium, it seems that the peoples that settled at Kültepe I were culturally distinct from those that settled at Kültepe II.

== Copper–arsenic ==
Soviet scientists decided that Kultepe (Kul'tepe) is the place where the first items made of copper–arsenic alloys, dating back to the 4th millennium BC, were found in the South Caucasus.

The local method of arsenic copper production was confirmed by results of chemical investigation and casting forms and the remains of casting discovered there.

== Regional influence ==
Archaeological site Alikemek Tepesi is located in the Mughan plain along the Aras river. Some archaeologists speak of the ancient Alikemek-Kul'tepe culture of southeastern Caucasus, that followed the Shulaveri–Shomu culture, and covered the transition from the Neolithic to Chalcolithic periods (c. 4500 BC). Aratashen (following level II) was also part of this culture.

The Alikemek–Kul'tepe culture covered the Ararat Plain, Nakhchivan, the Mil’skoj and Mugan Steppes and the region around Lake Urmia in north-western Iran

== Kultepe-2 ==
Kültepe-2 is located about 1.5 km north of Kultepe 1, or about 10 km north of Nakhchivan on the west bank of the river between the villages of Kültepe and Didivar. The site is nearly 10 ha in extent; it was occupied during the Early (Kura–Araxes culture), and Middle Bronze Age.

Osman Abibullaev first investigated this location in 1962, as part of his work on Kültepe-1. In 2006, the Naxçivan Archaeological Project started to investigate the site again.

The Kura–Araxes town may have been c. 5 hectares, and over the later period the settlement extended to the full 10 ha, so this is a very large site in the area.

== Nakhchivan Tepe ==
Nakhchivan Tepe is yet another important Chalcolithic settlement in the area that is dated to the first half of the 5th millennium BC. It is located about 5km south of the Kultepe site. Nakhchivan Tepe is an archaeological site where the painted ceramics of the Dalma culture have been found.

The settlements in the Lake Urmiah basin traded the obsidian from the deposits of the Zangezur mountain range, and Nakhchivan was the intermediary. Also some copper ore was found at Nakhchivan Tepe which also originated at Zangezur mountains.

Uzun oba is another similar chalcolithic site in the area.

== Other monuments ==
There was a 17th-century Armenian church (St. Hripsime Church) located in the center of the village. The church was destroyed at some point between 1997 and 2009.

== See also ==
- Makhta Kultepe
- Kul Tepe Jolfa in Iran
- Zeyvə, Nakhchivan
- St. Hripsime Church (Kultepe)
- Uzun oba

== Gallery ==
Findings of Kultepe. Azerbaijan State Museum of History

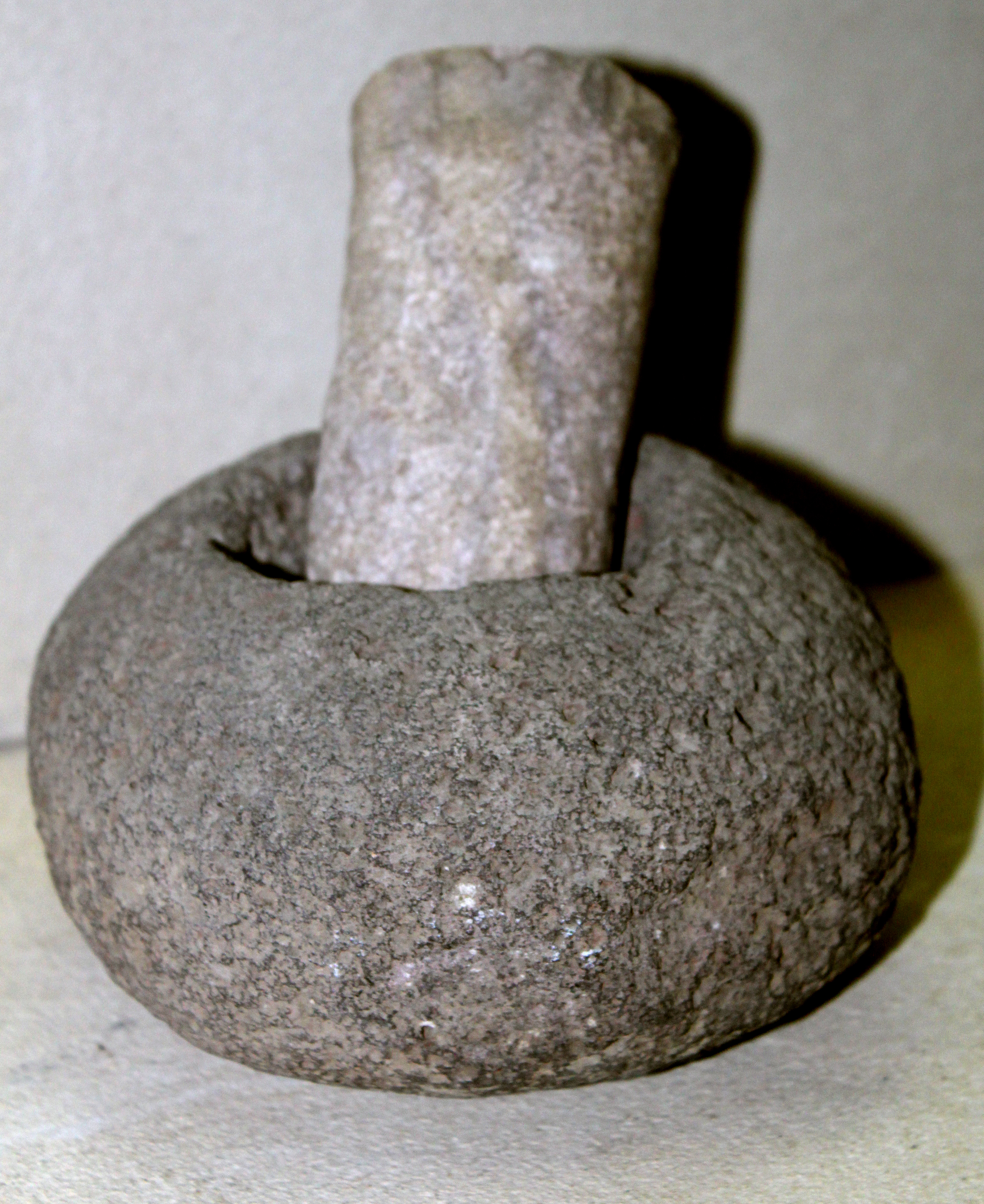
Mortar

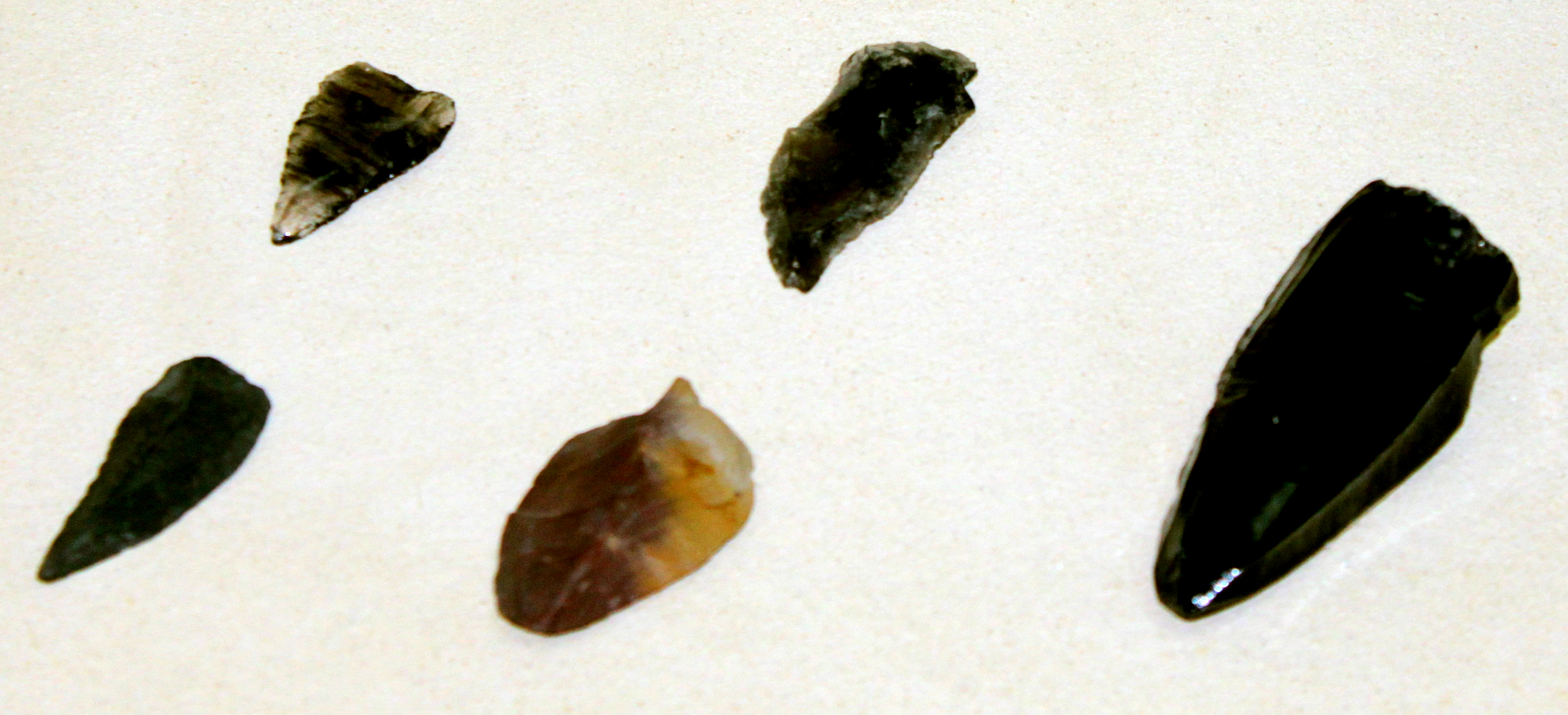
Arrowheads

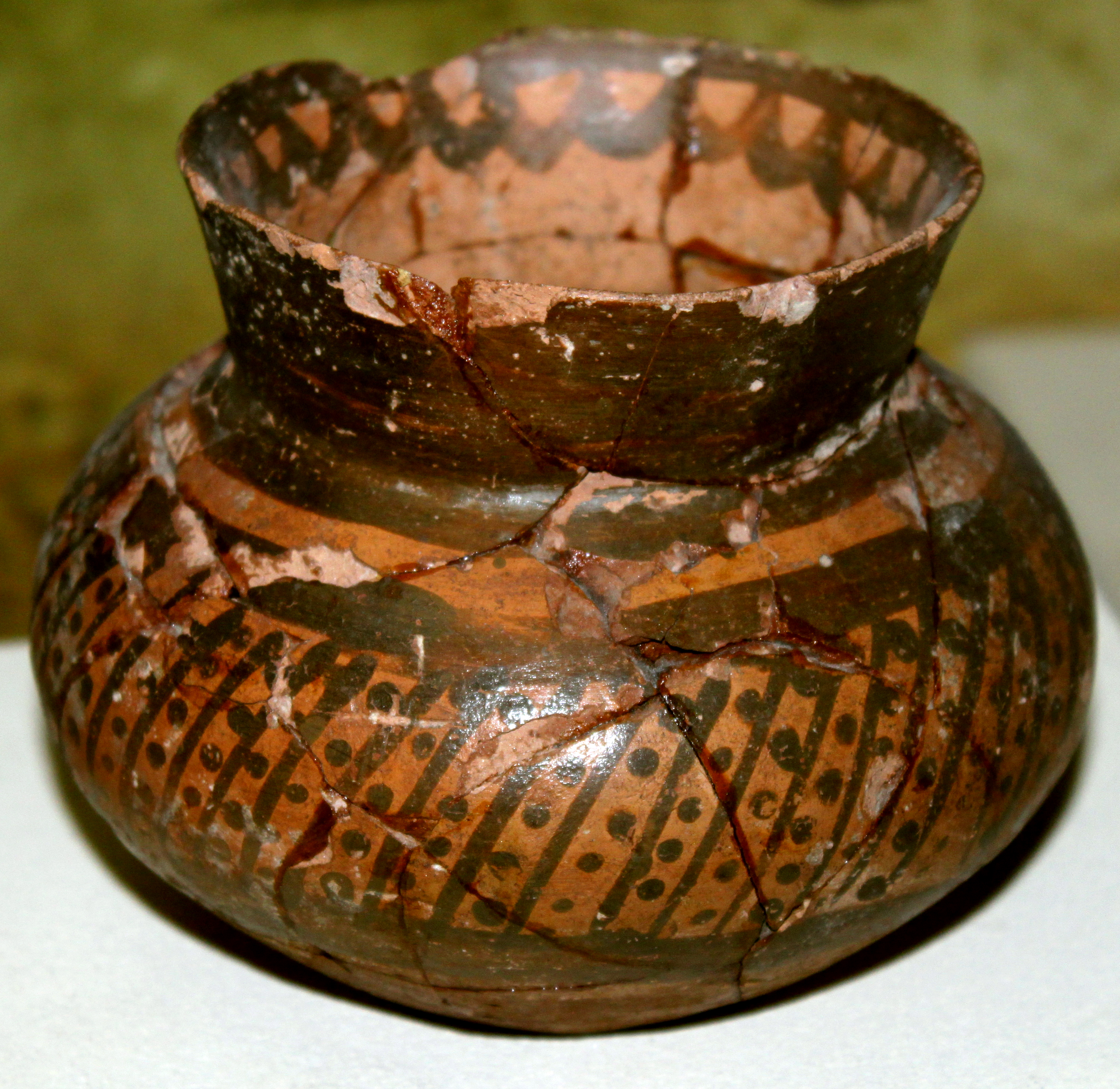
Painted vessel from Kultepe I

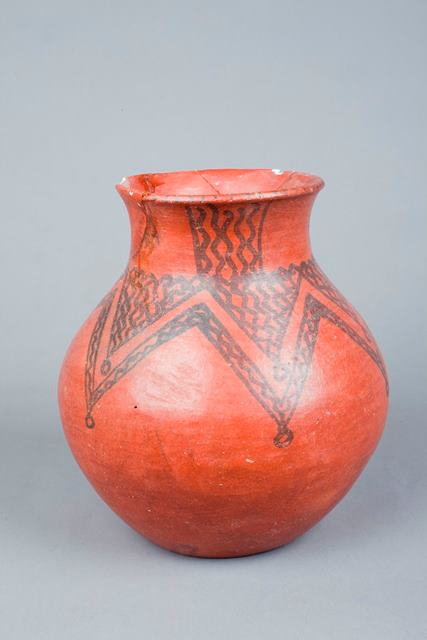
Painted vessel from Kultepe II

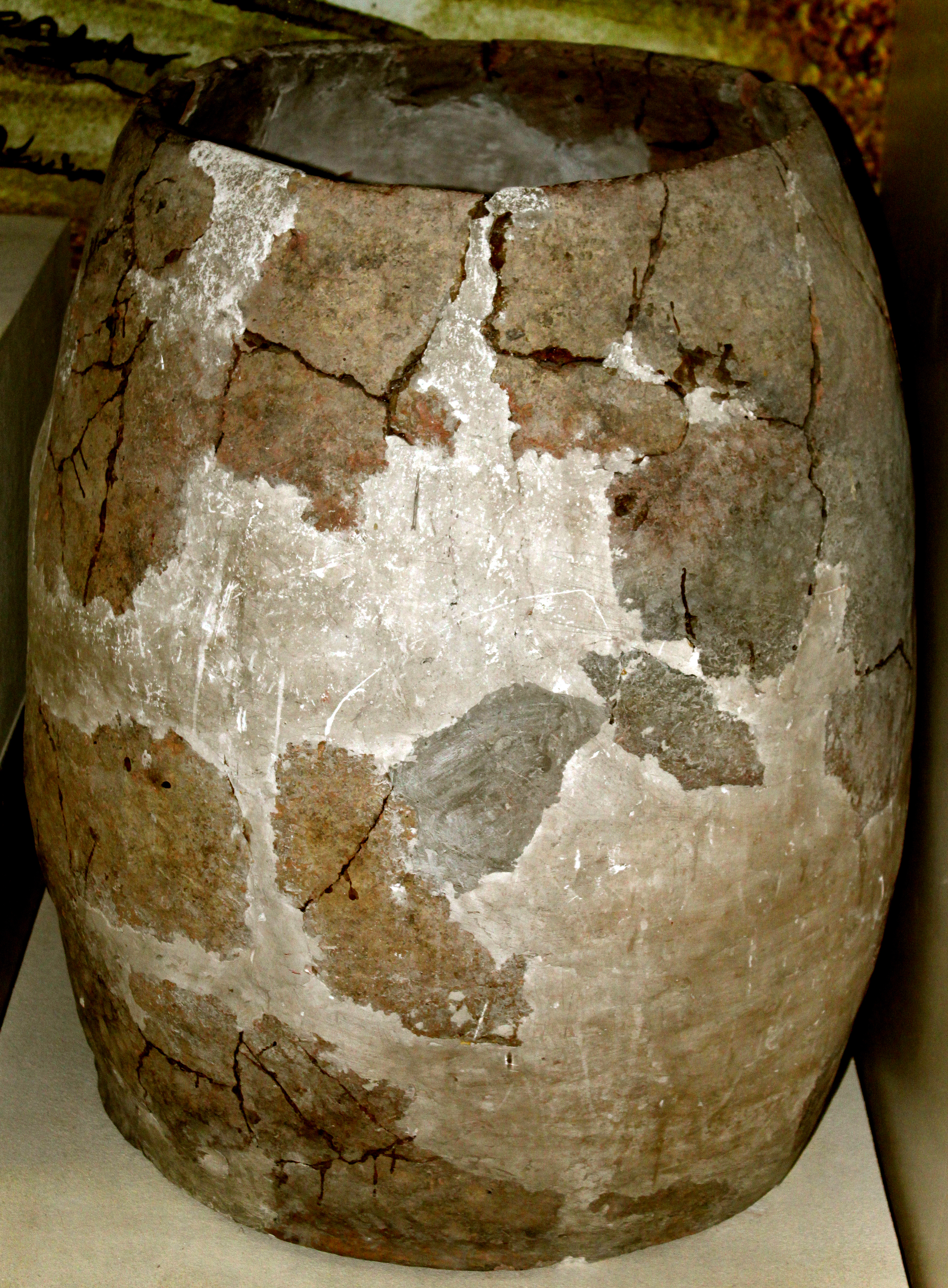
Clay pitcher

== Literature ==
- Абибуллаев О. А. Некоторые итоги изучения холма Кюльтепе в Азербайджане, СА, 1963.
- Абибуллаев О. А. Энеолит и бронза на территории Нахчыванской АССР, Баку, 1983.
