= Kul Tepe Jolfa =

- Location within Near East Location within Iran
- 38.838°N 45.658°E
- Type: Settlement
- Location: Jolfa County, Iran

Site notes
- Condition: In ruins

Kul Tepe Jolfa (Gargar Tepesi) (Kul Tapeh) is an ancient archaeological site in the Jolfa County of Iran, located in the city of Hadishahr, about 10 km south from the Araxes River.

It dates to Chalcolithic period (5000–4500 BC), and was discovered in 1968. Occupation continues into the late Bronze Age. Pottery sherds have also been recovered from the Bronze Age and Urartian periods.

== Description ==
Kul Tepe is a multi-period tell about 6 ha in extent, and 19 m high. It is located 967 m above sea level.

About 50km away is the related site of Kultepe, Azerbaijan. In Iran downstream the Araxes river, two additional sites from the same period have also recently been excavated, Kohne Pasgah and Kohne Tepesi.

At Kul Tepe Jolfa, material was found from the Dalma culture period (5000–4500 BC), and then following to the Pisdeli period, Chaff-Faced Ware horizons, and Kura–Araxes I and II periods. This is the Early Trans-Caucasian or Kura–Araxes culture, which spread through the Caucasus and the Urmia Basin around 3500 BC.

Later, the Middle and Late Bronze Age (Urmia ware), and Iron and Urartian/Achaemenid periods are also attested.

Dava Goz is another related site in the area that was recently excavated. It is located about 5km north of Dizaj Diz, Iran. This is a small and very old site that begins in the Late Neolithic/Transitional Chalcolithic period, similar to Hajji Firuz Tepe; it may have started c. 6000 BC.

Chaff-faced and chaff-tempered pottery with combed surfaces is a typical Late Chalcolithic pottery of Southern Azerbaijan. It is found in Kultepe, Azerbaijan and elsewhere in the Nakhichevan region, and in the Lake Urmia region of north-western Iran. But it is also common in other areas of the Middle East, such as in northern Syria and Mesopotamia. It is very well attested at Amuq.

According to Akbar Abedi,

"To sum up, the emerging picture suggests that the Chaff-Faced Ware system, whose focus was the highlands, was progressively challenged during the 4th millennium in the north as in the south, by the Kura––Araxes and Uruk expansions, respectively. After a period of coexistence with both, the Chaff-Faced Ware culture was superseded in the highlands by the Kura-Araxes phenomenon, whose driving forces probably had some decisive advantage over its regional neighbours: judging by the importance of metallurgy and mining activities in the Kura-Araxes world, this advantage could have been technological."

== See also ==
- Geoy Tepe
- Kültəpə, Azerbaijan
- Kültepe, Turkey

== Bibliography ==
- Abedi A., Khatib Shahidi H., Chataigner CH., Niknami K., Eskandari N., Kazempour M., Pirmohammadi A., Hosein-zadeh J. and Ebrahimi GH. 2014. Excavation at Kul Tepe of (Jolfa), North-Western Iran, 2010: First Preliminary Report. Ancient Near Eastern Studies 51:33-167
- Abedi A., Omrani B. 2013. 5th Millennium B.C. in NW Iran: Dalma and Pisdeli Once Again. Conference presentation in: A new look at old routes in Western Asia: Rethinking Iran in the 5th millennium BCE. Berlin: May 31-2 June.
- Bakhchaliyev V., Ashurov S. and Marro C. 2009. The Excavations of Ovçular Tepesi (2006-2008): First Results and New Perspectives. In B. Helwing, V. Ioseliani (eds.), Azerbaijan - Land between East and West. Transfer of knowledge and technology during the "First Globalization" of the VIIth-IVth millennium BC. International symposium, Baku, April 1-3 2009. Deutsches Archäologisches Institut, Eurasien-Abteilung. Berlin: 55–62.
- Kohl P. L. 2007. The Making Bronze Age of Eurasia. Cambridge University Press. Cambridge.
- Lyonnet B. 2007. La culture du Maikop, la Transcaucasie, l'Anatolie orientale et le Proche-Orient: relations et chronologie. In B. Lyonnet (ed.), Les cultures du Caucase, VIe-IIIe millénaires avant notre ère: leurs relations avec le Proche-Orient. Editions Recherche sur les civilisations. CNRS Éditions. Paris: 133–162.
- Marro, C., V. Bakhshaliyev and S. Ashurov (2010). Excavation at Ovcular Tepesi (Nakhichevan, Azerbaijan). First Preliminary Report: the 2006–2008 seasons. Anatolia Antiqua, IFEA, Paris
