= Kültepe Dam =

Coordinates: 38.8155°N 34.1692°E

- Interactive map of Kültepe Dam
- Location: Turkey

Kültepe Dam is a dam in Turkey. The development was backed by the Turkish State Hydraulic Works.

== See also ==
- List of dams and reservoirs in Turkey
