= Zeyvə, Nakhchivan =

Zeyvə
- Municipality
- Location within Azerbaijan
- Coordinates: 39°34′44″N 45°01′37″E
- Country: Azerbaijan
- Autonomous republic: Nakhchivan
- District: Sharur

Population (2005)
  - Total: 2,526
- Time zone: UTC+4 (AZT)

Zeyvə (also, Zeyva and Zaviya) is a village and municipality in the Sharur District of Nakhchivan, Azerbaijan. It is located near of the Nakhchivan-Sadarak highway, 3 km in the north-west from the district center, on the plain. Its population is mainly, busy with farming and animal husbandry. There are secondary school, library, club, mosque and a medical center in the village. It has a population of 2,526.

== Etymology ==
In the document of the 1728, the village was registered with the name of Əhmədpaşa zaviyəsi (Ahmadpasha zawiya). Zeyva is derived from the Arabic word of Zawiya and used in meaning "cell", "temple", "corner", "angle". In certain periods, including the Safavid era the clergymen were considered of privileged groups. The Əxizaviyəsi (15th century), Bibiheybət (17th) in the Kürdəxanı (Kurdakhani) are the memories of that period. The places named Zeyva, were the places which built the beyond from the people, for the clergymen, ascetics (they were called zaviyənişin).

== Historical and archaeological monuments ==
=== Zeyva Necropolis ===
Zeyva Necropolis - the archaeological monument of the first Iron Age near of the same named village of Sharur region. It was found during construction work. Examples of pottery (mainly, cooked cup in gray color, bowl and jug-type containers and their various parts) are collected at the result of archaeological research. The findings are kept in the History and Ethnography Museum of Sharur rayon. The materials of Zeyva Necropolis finds to itself in a wide analogy among the monuments (I and II Kültəpə, Sarı dərə, Kolanı, Şahtaxtı) of the first Iron Age of Nakhchivan. Zeyva necropolis is supposed to have belongs to the 1st millennium of BC.
