= Uçan ağıl =

Archaeological site in Azerbaijan

Uçan ağıl is an archaeological site north of Sirab village in Babek District of Nakhchivan Autonomous Republic, Azerbaijan. It is located at the altitude of 1200 m a.s.l. in the Sirab piedmonts, in the upper reaches of Sirab Suyu river along with other sites from the same period, Sorsu, and Zirinclik. It is dated at ca 4850-4350 BC time span, but was also occupied in the 3rd millennium BC. Uçan Ağıl was likely used by mobile pastoralists on a seasonal basis. They mostly pastured herds of goats.

== Description ==
Uçan ağıl was investigated through archaeological excavations from 2015 to 2017 by an international archaeological expedition from Azerbaijan and France led by Vali Baxşəliyev and Catherine Marro. The surface materials are painted bowls and straw ceramics. Among the finds are ceramic pieces from the Kura–Araxes culture. Among the results, a number of tools similar to stone axes are known from Duzdağ (see List of Monuments in Nakhchivan#Duzdagh_field). This settlement is important in terms of spreading and learning the Dalma culture in Azerbaijan and South Caucasus.

The Early Chalcolithic pottery of Uçan Ağıl is quite distinct and is basically unknown elsewhere. The ceramics of the Late Chalcolithic period is again different from the Early Chalcolithic. The Late Chalcolithic ceramic repertoire is mostly chaff-tempered and chaff-faced. It is similar to Ovcular, but represents a slightly earlier version of it.
