= Dalma culture =

Prehistoric archaeological culture of north-western Iran

- Geographical range: Western Iran
- Period: Neolithic
- Dates: c. 5000 BC – c. 4500 BC
- Preceded by: Hajji Firuz culture
- Followed by: Pisdeli culture

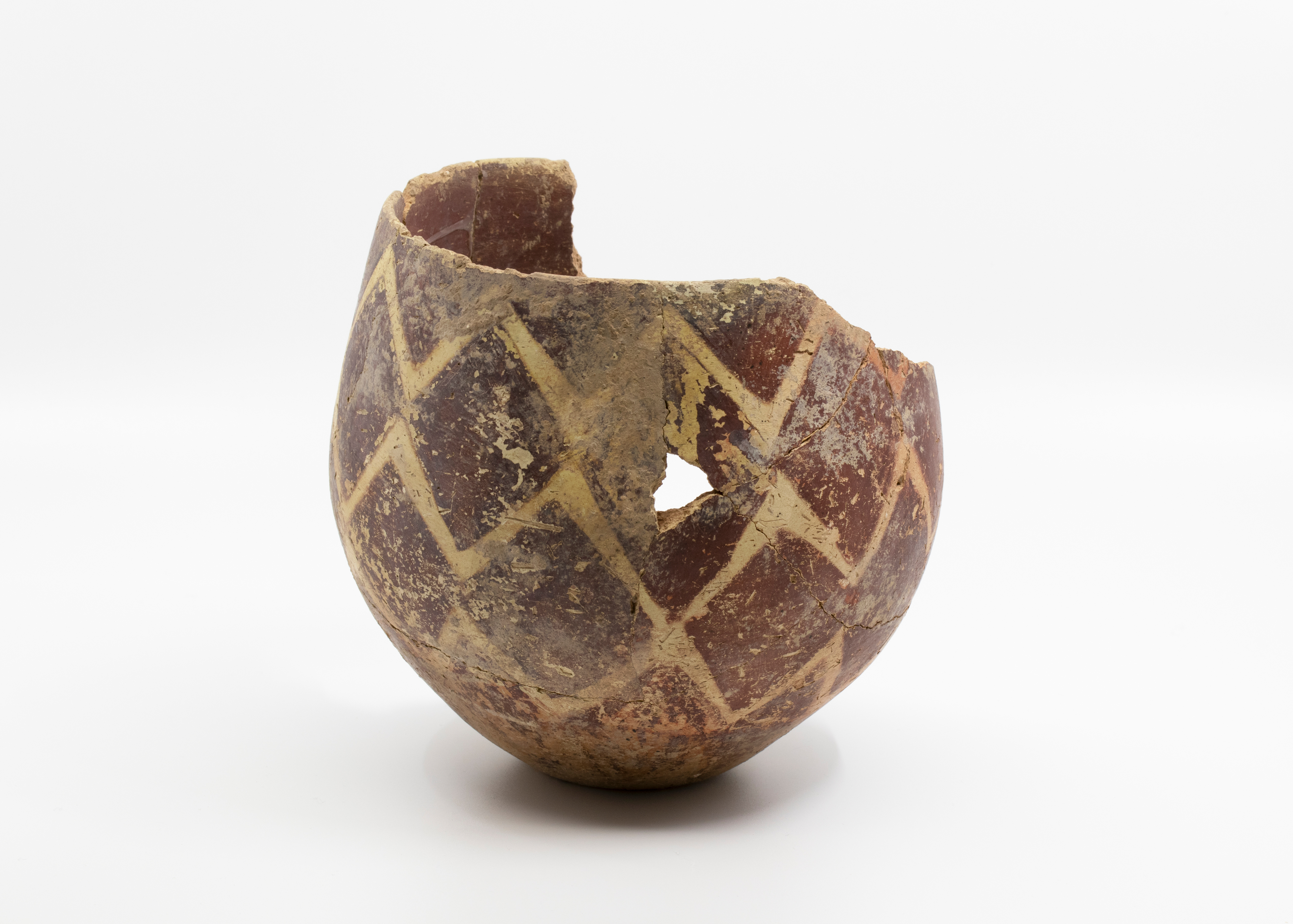
Dalma Ceramic Vessel excavated in Iran in 1961 by Robert H. Dyson Jr. Metropolitan Museum

Dalma culture was a prehistoric archaeological culture of north-western Iran dating to early fifth millennium B.C. Later, it spread into the central Zagros region and elsewhere in adjacent areas. Its widespread ceramic remains were excavated in central and northern valleys of the Zagros Mountains in north-western Iran. Dalma assemblages were initially discovered by the excavations carried out at Dalma Tepe and Hasanlu Tepe in south-western parts of Lake Urmia, in the valley of Solduz.

Further excavations in Dalma Tepe as part of the Hasanlu Project of the University of Pennsylvania in 1961 uncovered more Dalma assemblages. The excavated materials included architectural, burial, and ceramic remains, clay, bones, artifacts, ground stones, and chipped stones. They indicated that Dalma culture dated back to the fifth millennium B.C. As stated by Akbar Abedi, an Iranian archaeologist, Dalma is one of the famous type sites located in north-western Iran.

Excavated ceramics are the most prominent aspect of this culture that has been uncovered so far, and there is less information available about other aspects. The excavated materials do not provide sufficient details about Dalma people and their lifestyles.

Dalma material tradition was spread across a wide area in the region with analogues technical and stylistic characteristics. Excavated evidence indicates that this culture dispersed across central Zagros Mountains, northern Luristan, Urmia basin in Azerbaijan, and some parts of Mesopotamia such as Kirkuk. Traces of Dalma culture have been discovered in north-western parts of the Iranian Plateau. The widespread dispersal of Dalma tradition in this region argues that nomadic people were involved in the spread of this culture.

== Community ==
With the exception of pottery, other aspects of the culture, such as its origins, chronology, social, and economic structure, are poorly understood. Dalma Tepe is one of the first sedentary settlements in Ushun-Solduz Valley in north-western Iran.

=== Two types of settlements ===
As suggested by the three scholars, Akbar Abedi, Behrooz Omrani, and Azam Karimifar, the distribution of Dalma sites indicated two types of settlement pattern by Dalma people: firstly, permanent settlements in the valleys of the Zagros Mountain and secondly, temporary settlement sites in the highlands of north-western Iran including Zagros and Caucasian Mountains. The most likely settlement pattern of Dalma people was a small group of nomads moving between villages with which they maintained their connection through kinship. Dalma ceramics were distributed across a 40,000 km^{2} (15,000 sq mi) area.

The extensive spread of potteries in large quantities, the number of Dalma sites in the Zagros region, and the distance and travel time between these sites, suggest that Dalma vessels could not have been produced and distributed from local production sites such as local markets. These vessels must have been produced by regional ethnic groups at the household level and dispersed by the movement of nomadic tribes and their interactions with Dalma villages.

=== Sedentary communities ===
The burials in the excavated areas propose that Dalma people were part of a sedentary and farming community with common cultural characteristics. The homogeneous stylistic and morphological patterns among Dalma ceramics across a large geographical area may indicate a strong ethnical and socio-political identity among Dalma communities. Settlement patterns do not show signs of social hierarchy and political, economic, or religious structures existent within the Dalma society. The Dalma people's societal practices may have a modern analog in Kurdish tribal displays, such as clothing or carpet patterns, which are intended to publicly display tribal affiliation.

== Locations ==
=== Dalma Tepe ===
Dalma tepe is an archaeological site about 2km northeast of the town of Naqadeh (formerly Solduz), in Naqadeh County, Iran, at the southwestern end of Lake Urmia. Nearby, there are two other small tells. An important contemporary site of Ḥasanlū Tepe is also in the area.

Dalma remains were initially excavated at Dalma Tepe, in the Solduz Valley of north-western Zagros. Later, more contemporary sites were found in the Mahidasht and Kangavar valleys in the central Zagros region in Iran. Initial excavations in Dalma Tepe as part of the Hasanlu project yielded limited results due to insufficient excavation durations and a lack of available staff for the project. In 2021, Archaeological survey again began at Dalma Tepe after a six-decade hiatus.

Dalma culture originally began its existence around the Lake Urmia in north-western Iran and was then expanded into the central Zagros region. Several sites related to this culture, such as Dalma Tepe, are located around Lake Urmia.

=== Geographical distribution ===
Traces of Dalma ceramics have been found in the Caucasus Mountains, and parts of eastern Iraq such as Kirkuk and Jabal Hamarein.

According to the location of the excavated ceramics, Dalma culture's southern boundaries reached the eastern Kurdish valleys, central Zagros and, valleys of Kangavar and Nehavand in north-eastern Luristan. Dalma pottery tradition was diffused eastwards as far as Zanjan and Ardebil provinces. Traces of Dalma remains have not been excavated in the Iranian Plateau further in the east, or southern parts of Luristan and Khuzistan. The Chaine Magistrale (Persian: کوه سفید, Kuh-i Sefid) acted as a barrier and stopped the expansion of Dalma tradition towards the west. Traces of Dalma Impressed ware in the west have been found as far as the Diyala province. All of the routes for Dalma culture's development from the northwest were originated in the Lake Urmia region and intersected the Silk Road. The location of Dalma sites facilitated trade, access to main routes, exploitation of resources, and interaction of people between lowland and highland areas, which were all critical elements in the distribution of Dalma potteries.

According to Yukiko Tonoike, as of 2012, no further excavations had happened in the previously mentioned Dalma sites in Iran since 1979. A series of excavations done by Mahmoud Heydarian in Songhor and Koliyaei Plains of central Zagros from 2004 to 2009 uncovered Dalma potsherds in 9 archaeological sites, namely Khodaei, Sheikh-Jalil, Ab-Naz, Tepe Varz, Kalaavil, QolQole, and Nad Ali Beig. All of these sites are located in ecologically optimal locations for human settlement and close to riverbanks, springs, or canals. Since some of the sites are situated at higher altitudes and have colder weather conditions during winter and fall, they were probably occupied by semi-nomadic communities practicing animal husbandry.

== Excavated Materials ==
=== Burials ===
Initial excavations at Dalma Tepe revealed fourteen Dalma burials, which consisted of single infants placed tightly in ceramic vessels with no evidence of adult or juvenile burials. It appears that adults were buried outside of the settlements, and infants were interred under the architectural structures within the settlements. Sixteen burials which related to the periods after the Dalma tradition were discovered during these initial excavations.

=== Architecture ===
Dalma assemblage indicates evidence of walls made from "chineh (layers of packed mud)" which were sometimes separated by thin clay layers. Walls did not show any evidence of paintings on them, and their heights ranged from 15 to 60 centimetres. Evidence found in Dalma Tepe indicates the existence of structures with enclosed and open areas.

=== Artifacts ===
Artifacts initially discovered in Dalma Tepe consisted of ground stones, chipped stones, clay wares, bones, and ceramics. The latter formed the larger proportion of the discovered assemblage.

=== Ceramics ===
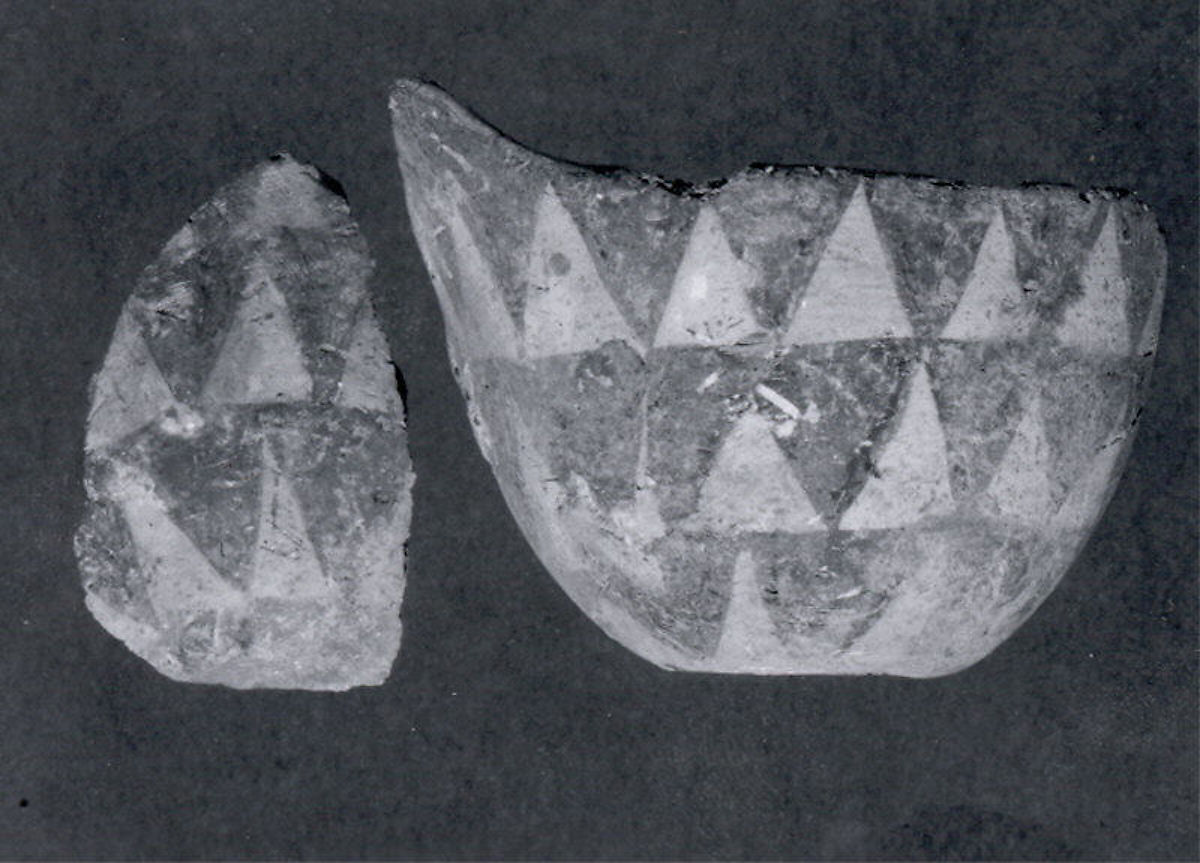
Dalma ceramic sherds excavated in 1961 in Dalma Tepe, Iran, as part of the University of Pennsylvania's Hasanlu project

Dalma ceramics were introduced in the region in the sixth millennium B.C. (Late Neolithic period), spread throughout north-western Iran during the fifth millennium B.C. (Chalcolithic period), and remained in use until the fourth millennium B.C. Jars, beakers, and bowls are among the excavated Dalma vessels.

==== Common Characteristics ====
Constant interactions among different Dalma communities ensured some levels of commonality among the vessels' characteristics. Ceramics excavated from Dalma sites were created by hand, and they were mostly made of chaff-tempered clay with small amounts of grit included. Since the ceramics were not appropriately baked, Dalma vessels have a dark and grey core with a pink to orange colour on the surface. Based on their surface characteristics, Dalma vessels can be categorised into the following groups:

1. Dalma Painted: Dalma painted wares have very different decoration patterns on the surface with bold geometric and triangular patterns. They are painted in red with purple and brown shades on light and yellow background. Parts of the excavated vessels in this category have double-coloured paintings on them, and the majority are monochrome.
2. Dalma Impressed: Initial excavations at Dalma Tepe indicated signs of change in Dalma ceramics as it appears that the earlier version of Dalma painted vessels were developed into distinctive impressed wares. These vessels have marks of fingertips and textiles stamped on them, and they are painted in red. In 1975, Carol Hamlin proposed that Dalma Impressed wares must have been made with some kind of cooking method as some of them have a dark surface.
3. Dalma Red Slipped: A large number of the excavated potteries fall into this category. Dalma Red Slipped ceramics have a thick red, cream, purple, or brown slip, which covers both outside and inside of the vessels in most cases. Some of the ceramics in this category have a double coating of a white layer and a second red layer.
4. Dalma Plain Ware: Dalma plain wares do not include any decorations on the surface.

==== Local Characteristics ====
Kangavar Valley: Excavated sites in the Kangavar Valley include Seh Gabi and Godin Tepe. Ceramics found in this site can be categorised into two groups called hard-ware and soft-ware, respectively. Soft-wares consist of vessels that are low-fired and have different decorations on their surface, and high-ware ceramics are uncoated, quite thin, and high-fired. Most of the Dalma potteries excavated in this valley fall into the soft-ware category. Hard-wares' decorations do not indicate Dalma stylistic elements; rather, they partly remind one of the Mesopotamia's Ubaid period decorative characteristics. The analysis done by Roghayeh Rahimi and Moein Eslami on the structure of the excavated potteries in the eastern Zagros region at Soha Chey Tepe, Iran, indicated that these non-Dalma ceramics have very different stylistics and technical structures compared to those of Dalma ceramics. According to these two experts, this stylistic and technical difference supports the hypothesis that these ceramics were imported into Dalma villages and were not produced locally.

Mahidasht Valley: Evidence of Dalma ceramics were found in 16 sites across this valley, namely Tepe Siahbid and Chogha Maran, and Tepe Koh. The same categorisation into hard-ware and soft-ware applies to the vessels excavated in this site. Soft-ware ceramics in this valley mostly consist of Dalma Red-Slipped and Plain wares. Dalma Impressed wares are excavated in lesser quantities in this valley compared to Kangavar Valley, and high-fired vessels with Ubaid reminiscent characteristics are more commonly found in Mahidasht Valley.

Lake Urmia Region: Dalma wares in this region include Plain, Impressed, and Painted wares.

== Chronology ==
Similar to other cultural traditions in the Near East, Dalma tradition exists from a cultural and chronological point of view. After its initial flourish in north-western Iran in the first half of the fifth millennium B.C, Dalma tradition spread southwards into the central Zagros region during the second half of the fifth millennium B.C.

As of 2015, lack of absolute dating in north-western Iran and the limited number of excavations carried out in Dalma sites had made it impossible to define an accurate chronological table for the Dalma tradition and timeline of the region in the Chalcolithic period. Chronologically, the Dalma period is a continuation of the region's Late Neolithic Hajji Firuz period, proceeded immediately by the Middle Chalcolithic Pisdeli period of north-western Iran, and contemporary to the Ubaid III period in Mesopotamia and the Sialk III tradition in Central Iranian Plateau.

As stated by Akbar Abedi, Behrooz Omrani, and Azam Karimifar, Dalma was the final result of the Hajji Firuz tradition development. With the exception of changes in pottery production, no other aspects of the material culture indicate signs of a discontinuity between Dalma and the preceding Hajji Firuz tradition.

According to James Mellaart, the British archaeologist, the advancement of pottery techniques in the Dalma period compared to the Hajji Firuz period is noticeable. He stated that Dalma wares might have been developed from the vessels created in the Hajji Firuz period as they contain painting elements common to this period as well as some new stylistic innovations.

Radiocarbon dating results have indicated that there must have been a transitional period of 400 years between Hajji Firuz and Dalma traditions in this region at the end of the 6th millennium B.C.

According to Steve Renette (2022), Dalma tradition started during the final centuries of the 6th millennium BCE, and it may have continued until the middle of the 5th millennium.

But according to Johnny Samuele Baldi (2022), the associated Dalma traditions, which he analyses, are all much later than Neolithic and Early Chalcolithic. Instead, they were closer to the Middle Chalcolithic in date, and continued during the Late Chalcolithic (LC1). Which would amount to the range between 4700 and 4250 BCE.

== Chaff-Faced Ware ==
Chalcolithic chaff-faced ware appeared in the South Caucasus and Upper Mesopotamia in the first half of the 5th millennium BCE. According to Catherine Marro (2022), the systematic use of chaff, creating a Chaff-Faced Ware effect, is attested from the beginning of the 5th millennium BCE with the development of the Dalma culture.

This Chaff-Faced Ware oikumenè is also indicated by the "common trends in house building and funerary traditions". The trends in obsidian use are also relevant here.

"The earliest Caucasian chaff-faced repertoires have so far been evidenced in the Middle Araxes valley, as illustrated by the ceramic assemblages from Nakhchivan Tepe and Uçan Ağıl. Nakhchivan Tepe may be considered as a Dalma site ... "
