= Aşağı Uzunoba =

- Municipality
- Location within Azerbaijan
- Coordinates: 39°16′29″N 45°26′23″E
- Country: Azerbaijan
- Autonomous republic: Nakhchivan
- District: Babek

Population (2005)
  - Total: 448
- Time zone: UTC+4 (AZT)

Aşağı Uzunoba (also, Ashaghy Uzunoba and Uzun-oba-ashaga) is a village and municipality in the Babek District of Nakhchivan, Azerbaijan. It is located in the right side of the Nakhchivan-Shahbuz highway, 18 km in the north from the district center, on the right bank of the Nakhchivanchay River. Its population is busy with grain growing, vegetable-growing and animal husbandry. There are secondary school, library, club and a medical center in the village. It has a population of 448. The name of the village means "the Uzunoba village which is located in the below".

== Notable Natives ==
- Ziyafet Asgerov - (24.10.1963, Aşağı Uzunoba, Babek District) First Deputy Chairman of the Azerbaijan Parliament of the Azerbaijan Republic.
