= Sovetabad =

Sovetabad may refer to:

- Sovetabad, Babek, Azerbaijan
- Sovetabad, Sharur, Azerbaijan
- Həsənabad, Azerbaijan
- Şuraabad, Khizi, Azerbaijan
