= Sovetabad, Azerbaijan =

Sovetabad, Azerbaijan may refer to:

- Sovetabad, Babek, Nakhchivan
- Arpaçay, Azerbaijan, Nakhchivan
- Şuraabad, Khizi
