= Yaşma (disambiguation) =

Yaşma or Yashma may refer to:

- Yaşma
- Yeni Yaşma
- İkinci Yaşma
