= Türkoba =

Türkoba or Tyurkoba may refer to:

- Türkoba, Khizi, Azerbaijan
- Türkoba, Masally, Azerbaijan
