= Sovetabad, Nakhchivan =

Sovetabad, Nakhchivan may refer to:

- Sovetabad, Babek
- Arpaçay, Azerbaijan
