= Agarak, Aragatsotn =

Agarak Ագարակ
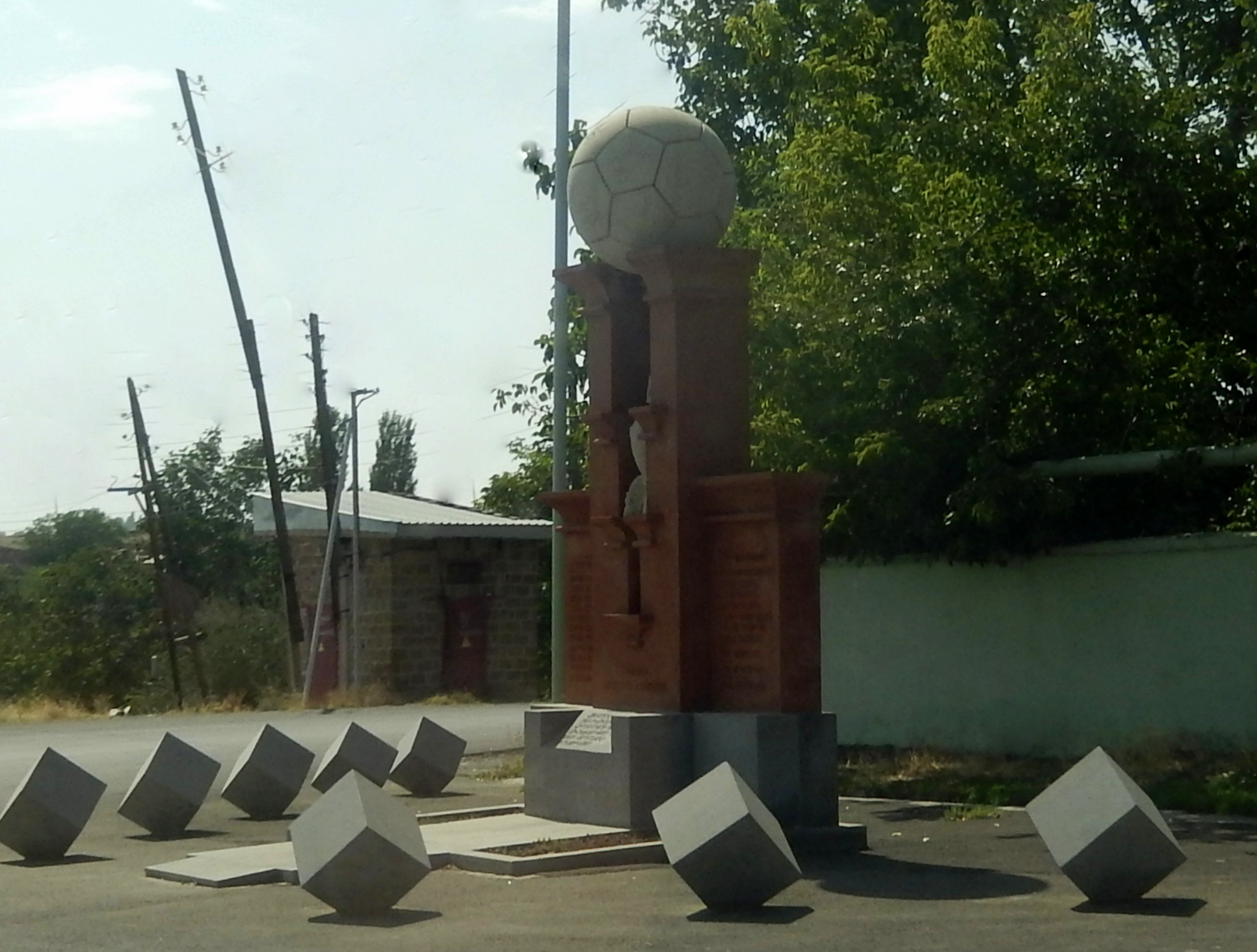
- Memorial dedicated to the victory of FC Ararat Yerevan in the 1973 season of the USSR football league

- Location within Armenia Location within Aragatsotn
- Coordinates: 40°18′09″N 44°16′44″E
- Country: Armenia
- Province: Aragatsotn
- Municipality: Ashtarak
- Founded: 1919

Population (2011)
  - Total: 1,564
- Time zone: UTC+4
  - Summer (DST): UTC+5

Agarak (Armenian: Ագարակ) is a village in the Ashtarak Municipality of the Aragatsotn Province of Armenia. It is located on Amberd River. The modern settlement was founded mainly by emigrants from Van, Gavash and Bitlis.

In 1897 the population of Agarak was 603; in 1979 it had reached 1150.

== Archaeology ==
The archaeological site of Agarak is located south of the highway on the west side of the Amberd Canyon. A dirt road leads from the village sign to the south on the mound.

The site contains some of the oldest large man-made structures carved into stone, dating to the Early Bronze Age ('Agarak 1' dated 3400 BC) and the earliest in the Caucasus. Rock wells, rock-cut stairways, corridors, and horseshoe-shaped structures are found.

The Early Bronze Age culture area covers 200 hectares, of which 118 hectares have been declared a protected zone. The town had a regular street plan., and what may have been an astronomical observatory. The walls surrounding the settlement were up to one metre thick and were made of sun-dried mud brick.

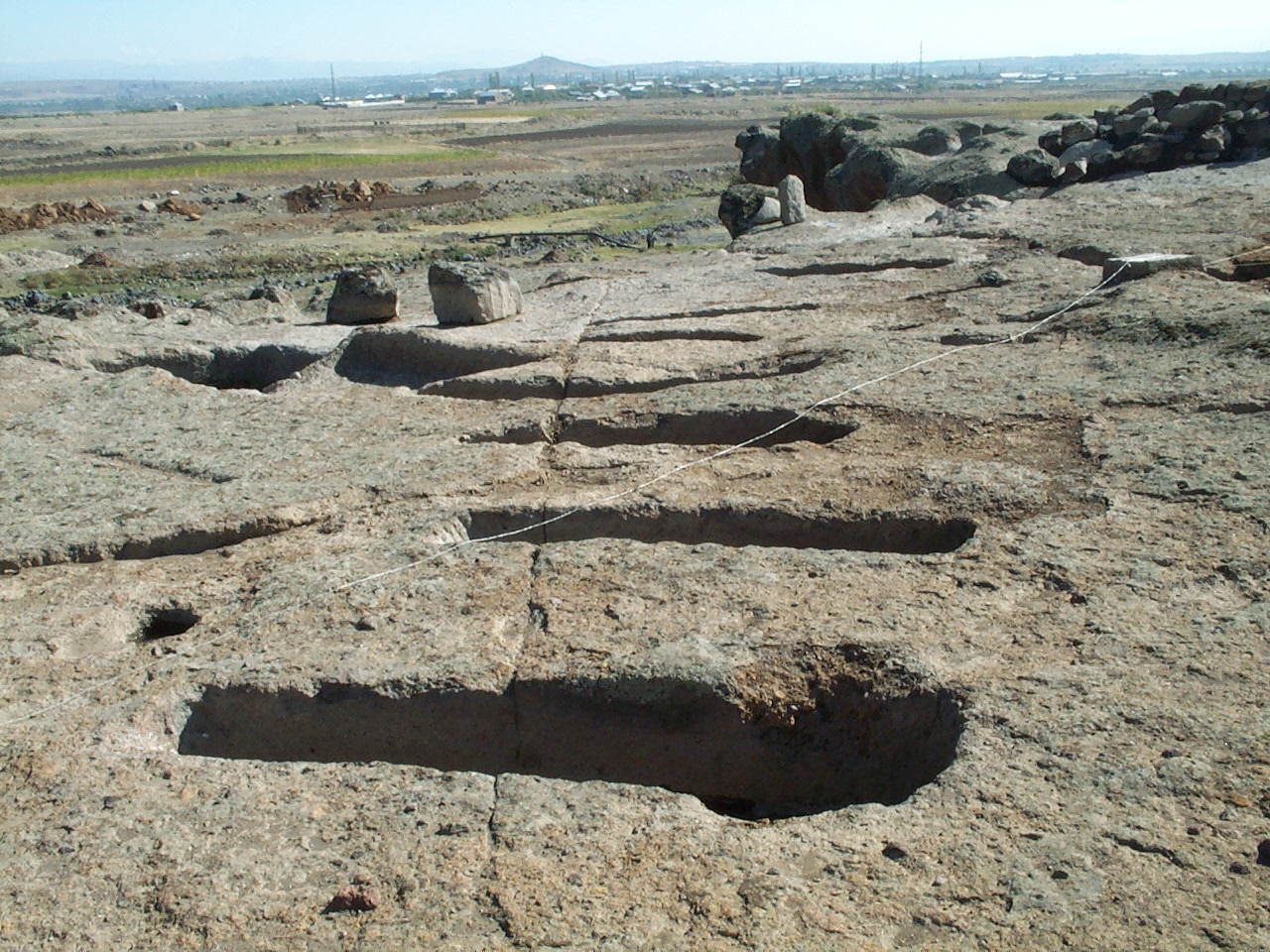
Rock structures from Agarak

A large quantity of potsherds, as well as numerous round portable clay fireplaces, represent the succeeding Kura–Araxes culture; they are dated to 29th-27th century BC, and are similar to Shengavit-type pottery.

The findings show a continuous settlement up to the end of the early Iron Age (9th century), and then to the fall of the Urartian Empire in the 6th century BC.

In 4th century BC, Agarak became an urban center due to its location on the Aras Valley trade route. Buried coins have been excavated, as well as well as signet rings from the Hellenistic and Roman periods.

Based on potsherd excavations Agarak was a village-level settlement in the early Middle Ages. There was also some sparse occupation during the 17th–18th centuries.

There are ruins of an Astvatsatsin church of the 5th–6th century, and it's added on *gavit* of the 10th–13th century, ruins of a 10th-century church of Amenaprkich (also known as Tukh Manuk), and the ruins of a 17th-century mosque.
