= Nakhchivan culture =

Archaeological culture from the 3rd and 2nd millennium BC, Azerbaijan

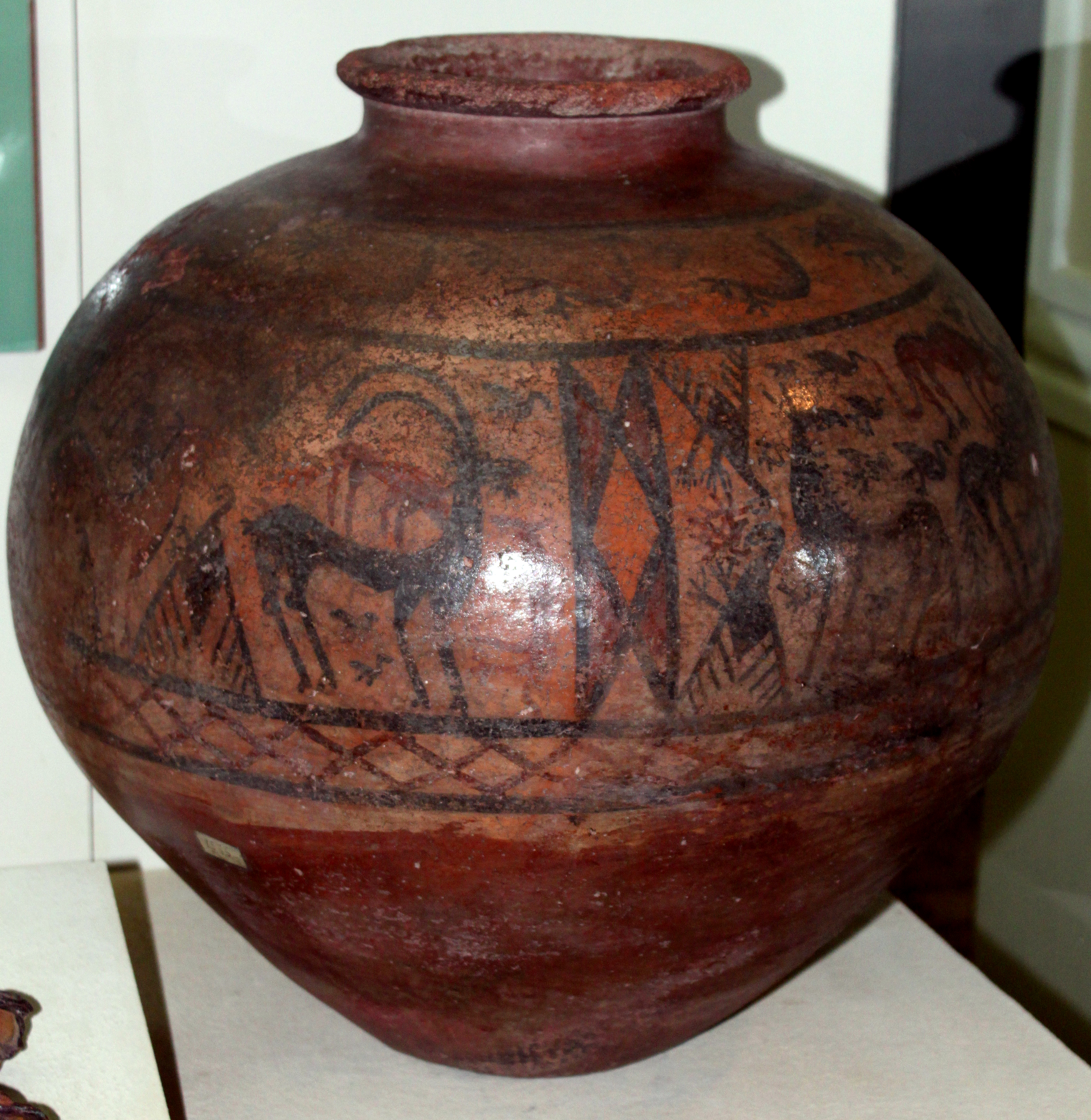
Painted vessel. Shakhtakhti

The Nakhchivan culture, also known as the Kizilveng culture or Painted Pottery culture, was formed during the Middle Bronze Age in the 3rd and 2nd millennium BC. The main center of painted pottery were Nakhchivan and the Arpachay Valley, in Anatolia, Urmia lake basin and the South Caucasus. In Azerbaijan, this culture was studied on the basis of archeological materials from the I Kultepe, II Kultepe, Shahtakhti, Gizilburun, Nahjir, Shortepe, Garachuk, II Gazanchi qala and other monuments. The painted pottery culture was studied by Azerbaijani archaeologists such as O. Habibullayev, V. Bakhshaliyev, V. Aliyev and A. Akbarov. According to V. Bakhshaliyev, the formation of this culture dishes in Nakhchivan was connected with the formation of the city states.

Recent researches suggested that the painted pottery culture of Nakhchivan was the result of the natural development of the Kura–Araxes culture.

== History ==
The first time that samples of painted pottery culture were discovered in Azerbaijan was in the territory of Nakhchivan, in 1895. In the result of the land work around Kizilveng cemetery located 18 km away from Nakhchivan, 3 km south of Tazakand, on the left bank of the Araz River, several historical items, including simple and painted dishes were revealed from the stone box graves. Captain N. Fyodorov conducted excavations on behalf of the Archeological Commission in Nakchivan where he found burials with painted pottery dated to the end of the 2nd millennium BC. A relatively extensive study of the painted culture in Azerbaijan was made possible during the Soviet period. In 1926, the Kızılvenk cemetery was investigated by the Trans-Caucasian Sciences Association under the leadership of A. Miller in Nakhchivan. In 1934, several painted dishes were found near the Shortepe settlement in Sharur. Excavations continued in the 1960s, painted pottery of Kultepe II, as well as Guruchay and Kondelenchay river basins were investigated. Scraps of painted dishes were found in Karakopektepe.

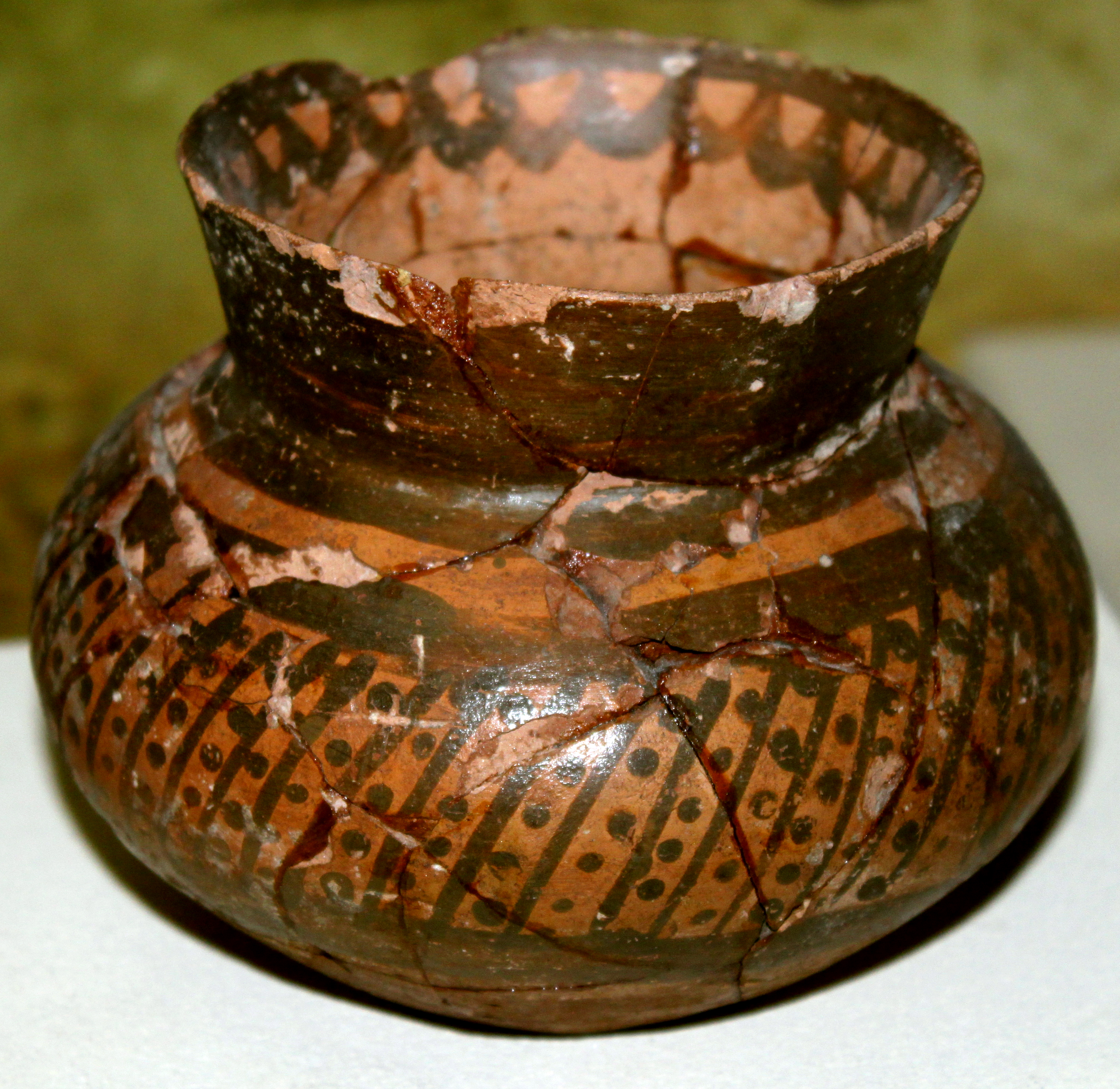
Polychrome vessel. I Kultepe

== Characteristics ==
Archaeologists divided this culture chronologically into four periods:

- XX-XVII centuries BC - simple pottery samples partially polished, monochrome painted (mainly black and gray), neatly decorated with simple geometric shapes or with human, animal, bird patterns; found from Shortepe, Kultepe I, Kultepe II, Uzerliktepe. Jugs, bowls, goblets.
- XVII-XV centuries BC - Polychrome painted vessels decorated with complex geometric shapes, finely decorated with human, animal and bird patterns, Jug and bowl shaped pottery. Gizilveng (Dancing couple illustrated on the pottery)
- XIV-XI centuries BC- Monochrome and polychrome painted, relatively inaccurately decorated with human, animal and bird patterns, geometric figures. Vases, ellipsoid bowls, jugs, plates, kettle-like pottery
- X-VII centuries BC- More rigid and simplistic geometric patterns dyed in only red color.

== Material remains ==
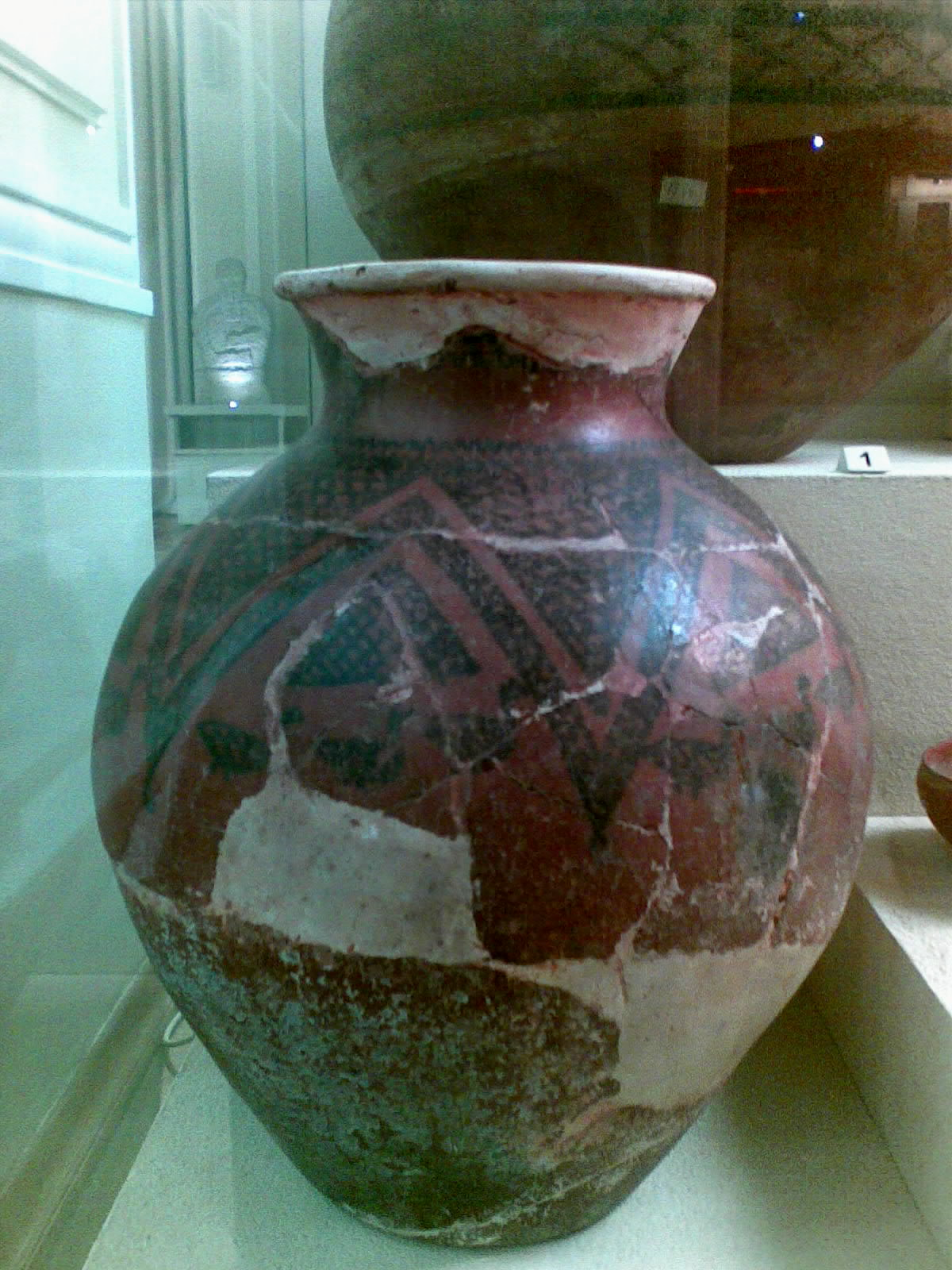
Painted vessel from II Kultepe

Painted pots were already represented in the ceramics of Nakhchivan's variant of the widespread Kura–Araxes culture that preceded Nakhchivan culture. In general, red on clay pots have been found in Azerbaijan since the Eneolithic period. Except a group of painted pots, the rest of them didn't differ from other eneolithic group pots by their clay content or the technology of preparation. In 1936, painted vessels belong to the Middle Bronze Age, were obtained from the second layer of the Shortepe settlement.

Monochrome painted ceramic patterns were discovered from the Dize necropolis. Monochrome painted pots dated to the III-II millenniums BC were mostly encountered in Yayjı necropolis in Nakhchivan. A wide range of animal drawings were illustrated on the monochrome painted long-necked jugs. In 1951, the archeological expedition organized by the Institute of History of the Academy of Sciences of the USSR under the leadership of O. Habibullayev conducted research in the Kultepe I and found painted dishes here.

There were both monochrome and polychrome type clay vessels discovered in Kultepe II. The red colored pots found on the upper layers of II Kultepe were identical to the materials of the I and II Makhta Kultepe residential areas. The painted pottery remains found in Uzerliktepe (Aghdam) were divided into two groups. While the first group was light red, resembles Kizilveng type painted dishes and featuring geometric and zoomorphic figures, the second group was polished. In addition to stamped black and gray decorations, there were also monochrome type dishes in Karaköpektepe region. In 2008, the study conducted by Nakhchivan branch of the ANAS and Georgian University of the USA under the leadership of V. Bakhshaliyev identified that the painted pots found in the Oghlanqala settlement belonged to the Iron Age.

== Relations with other cultures ==
Encountering similar painted vessel patterns of Nakhchivan were found in the Van and Urmia Lake basin, northeastern Anatolia, and the Mil-Mugan plains around Goyche indicates that these regions shared a mutual culture. There were many common features among polychrome pottery from Kultepe II and pottery remains from the Urmia monuments of Haftavān-Tepe and Geoy Tepe. The painted ceramics found in Kultepe I had a similarity to the materials of the Halaf culture. Researchers assumed that the population were linked to the south, to Mesopotamia.

The Middle Chalcolithic painted bowl found in the Shortepe also reminisced the Halaf and Ubaid traditions because of influence of these culture. Drawings depicted on the Nakhchivan's painted pottery symbolized worship tradition (Lullubi tribes). The 8 corners star drawing on a pot found in the Nehecir necropolis was similar to the star description on the Victory Monument of the Lullubi ruler Anubani. There were many similarities between the dress of the goddess depicted on Anubani's Victory Monument and the woman's dress on the Kızılburun painted pitcher.

== See also ==
- Bronze and Iron Age in Azerbaijan
- Stone Age in Azerbaijan
- History of Azerbaijan
