= Voskehat =

Voskehat may refer to:

- Voskehat, Aragatsotn, Armenia
- Voskehat, Armavir, Armenia
