= Voskehat, Aragatsotn =

Voskehat Ոսկեհատ
- Location within Armenia Location within Aragatsotn
- Coordinates: 40°16′35″N 44°16′28″E
- Country: Armenia
- Province: Aragatsotn
- Municipality: Ashtarak
- Founded: 1829
- Elevation: 1,025 m (3,363 ft)

Population (2024)
  - Total: 1,155
- Time zone: UTC+4

Voskehat (Armenian: Ոսկեհատ) is a village in the Ashtarak Municipality of the Aragatsotn Province of Armenia, located on the right bank of Amberd river, 7 km southwest of the provincial capital Ashtarak. It is surrounded by the villages of Agarak from the north, Voskevaz from the east and Lernamerdz from the south. It has an average elevation of 1025 meters above sea level.

== History ==
The villages was founded in 1829-30 after the Treaty of Turkmenchay. However, the area has been settled by human during the Iron Age based on the remains of a fortress and a settlement found in the village, dating back to the 2nd millennium BC.

The village is also home to the remains of a 14th-century church, as well as the Surp Sarkis fortress dating back to the 17th century.

== Economy ==
The population of Voskehat are mainly involved in cattle-breeding and agriculture, mainly grape and wheat.

The village of Voskehat is home to the "Ashtarak Dzu" poultry farm.

== Demographics ==
Historical population
Year	Pop.	±% p.a.
1831	51	—
1897	463	+3.40%
1926	281	−1.71%
1939	388	+2.51%
1959	549	+1.75%
1970	668	+1.80%
1979	761	+1.46%
1989	892	+1.60%
2001	995	+0.91%
2011	974	−0.21%
