= Ravaz =

Ravaz روض
- Village
- Location within Iran
- Coordinates: 39°10′34″N 44°18′41″E
- Country: Iran
- Province: West Azerbaijan
- County: Chaldoran
- Bakhsh: Central
- Rural District: Chaldoran-e Shomali

Population (2006)
  - Total: 111
- Time zone: UTC+3:30 (IRST)
  - Summer (DST): UTC+4:30 (IRDT)

Ravaz (Persian: روض, also Romanized as Ravaẕ) is a village in Chaldoran-e Shomali Rural District, in the Central District of Chaldoran County, West Azerbaijan province, Iran. At the 2006 census, its population was 111, in 21 families.

== Köhne Shahar ==
Köhne Shahar is a very large archaeological site located near the village. Situated in a narrow valley at the altitude of 1905m asl, it belongs to the Kura–Araxes culture, also known as the Early Transcaucasian Culture (ETC). Excavations here have identified ceramics similar to those of South Caucasus and east Anatolia belonging to ETC II phase, as well as to ETC III phase.

The site was excavated between 2012 and 2014 by archaeologist Karim Alizadeh. Kohne Shahar covers approximately 15 hectares, which is very large for Kura-Araxes sites. It consists of a citadel, which is separated by a large wall from the lower town that includes a cemetery.

A community-wide production economy has been identified here with little direct evidence for a stratified social organization. There are several areas of specialised craft production that used imported bitumen, manufacturing objects of stone, deer antler, and cattle horn. Also textiles were produced here.

Five distinct phases of occupation have been found, starting in 3200 BC, and continuing to 2500 BC.
