= Nshavan =

Village in Ararat, Armenia

Nshavan Նշավան
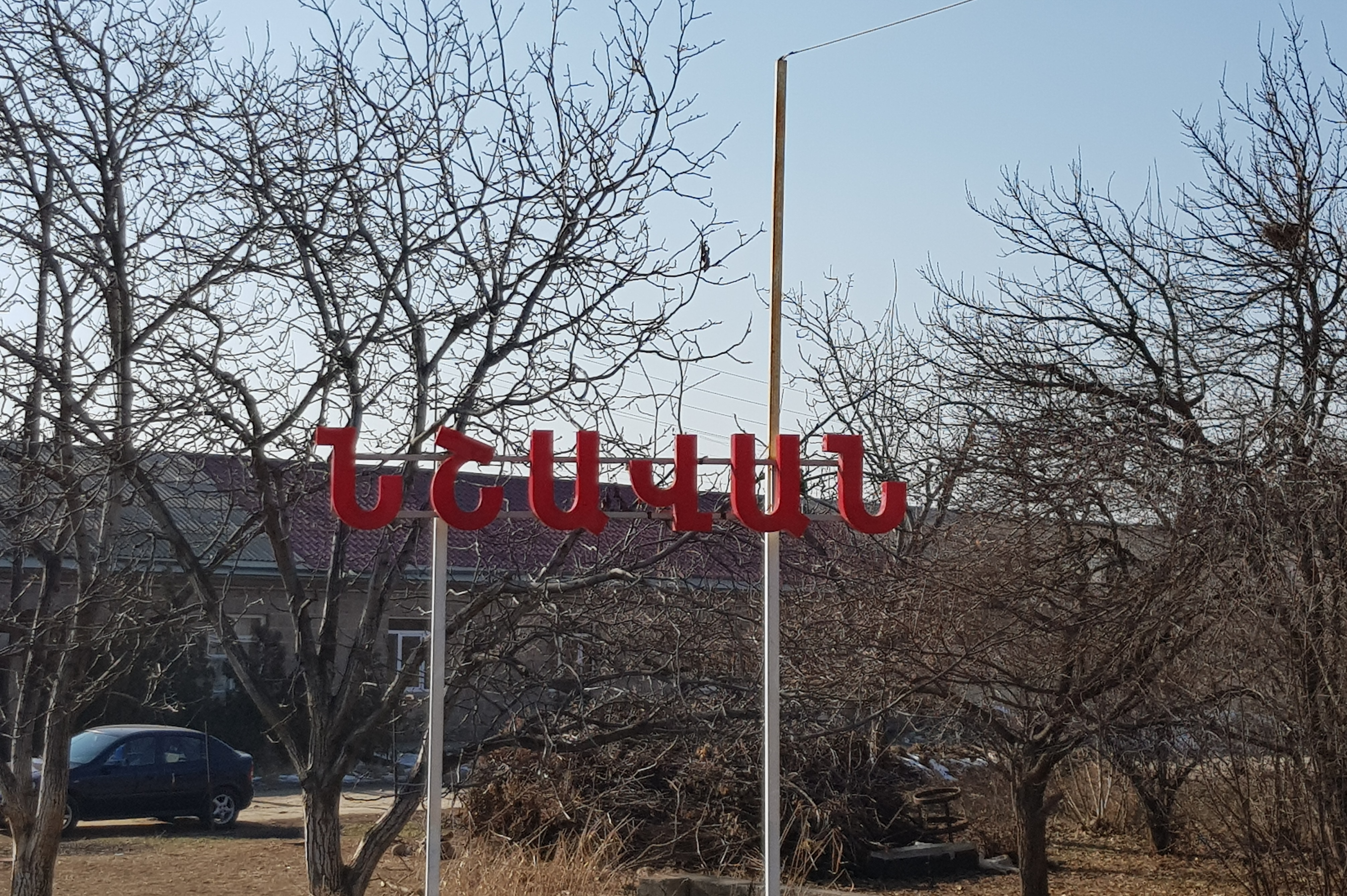
- Nshavan village sign

- Location within Armenia Location within Ararat
- Coordinates: 40°01′35″N 44°31′31″E
- Country: Armenia
- Province: Ararat
- Municipality: Artashat

Population (2011)
  - Total: 1,725
- Time zone: UTC+4
  - Summer (DST): UTC+5

Nshavan (Armenian: Նշավան) is a village in the Artashat Municipality of the Ararat Province of Armenia.
