= Yeni Yaşma =

Azerbaijani village

Coordinates: 40°45′N 49°28′E

Yeni Yaşma is a village and municipality in the Khizi Rayon of Azerbaijan. It has a population of 1,675.
