= Yaşma =

- Location within Azerbaijan
- Coordinates: 40°42′11″N 49°28′37″E
- Country: Azerbaijan
- Rayon: Khizi
- Municipality: Şuraabad

Population (2008)
  - Total: 212
- Time zone: UTC+4 (AZT)
  - Summer (DST): UTC+5 (AZT)

Yaşma (also, Iachma, Jaschma, and Yashma) is a village in the Khizi Rayon of Azerbaijan. The village forms part of the municipality of Şuraabad.
