= Türkoba, Khizi =

Türkoba is a village in the municipality of Şuraabad in the Khizi Rayon of Azerbaijan.
