= Aşağımollahasan höyük =

Mound in Turkey

- Location within Turkey
- 38°39′11″N 43°53′54″E
- Type: Settlement
- Location: Van Province, Turkey
- Region: Anatolia

Site notes
- Condition: In ruins

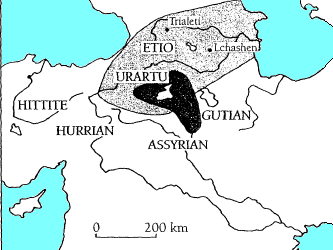
Early expansion of the Kuro-Araxes culture (light shading) shown in relation to subsequent cultures in the area, such as Urartu (dark shading).

Aşağımollahasan höyük is a höyük (mound) in Özalp, Turkey, and is the first known settlement in prehistory in the area of Van. It was discovered by Charles A. Burney.
