= Shengavit (site) =

Archaeological site in present-day Yerevan, Armenia

Shengavit Settlement
- Շենգավիթ բնակատեղի (Armenian)
- Shengavit
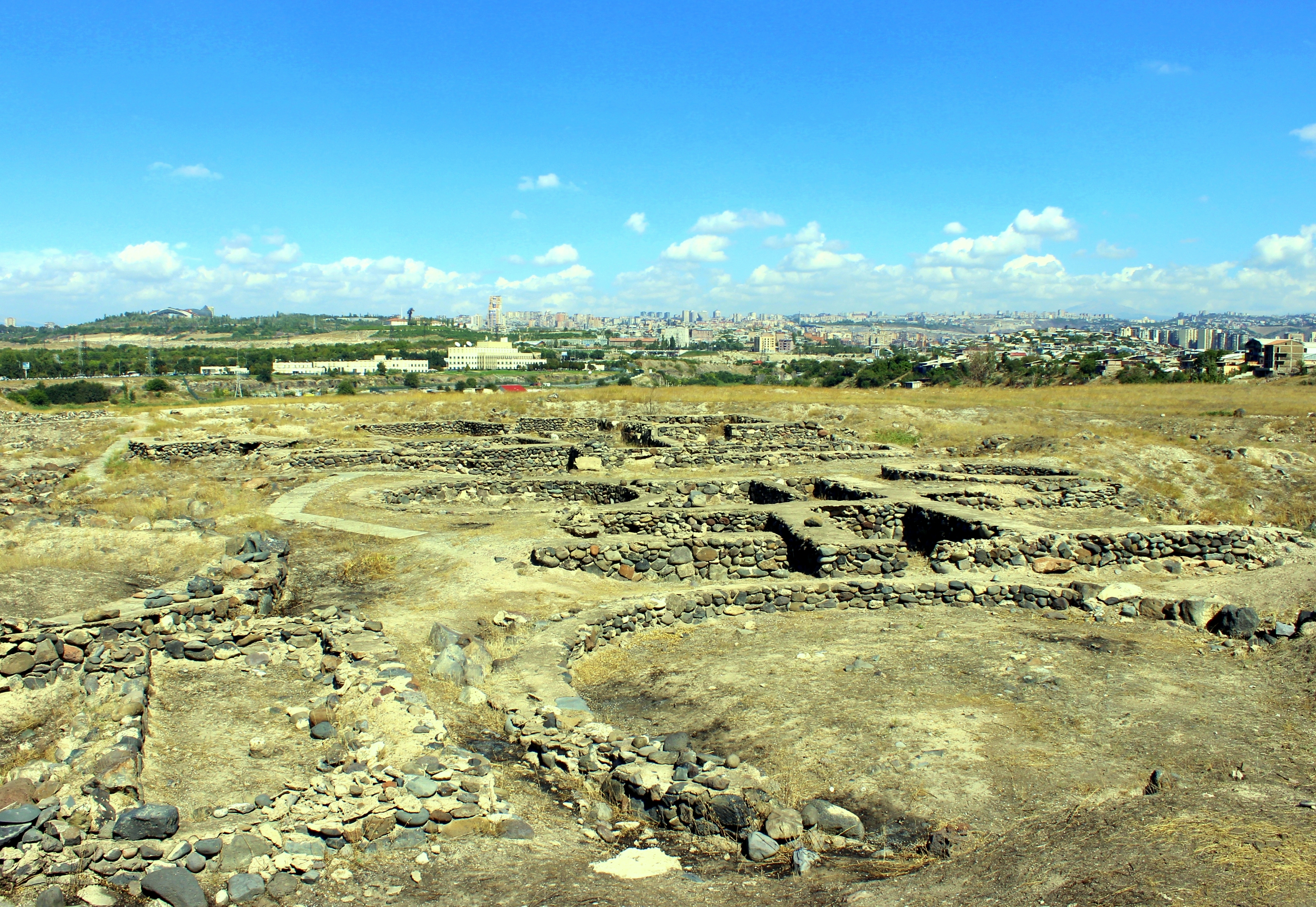
- Stone foundations of Shengavit Settlement
- Interactive map of Shengavit Settlement
- 40.156965°N 44.476862°E
- Type: Settlement
- Periods: Early Bronze Age
- Cultures: Kura-Araxes Culture
- Location: Yerevan, Armenia
- Region: Armenian Highlands

History
- Built: c. 3000 BC
- Abandoned: c. 2500 BC

Site notes
- Material: stone (foundation/lower walls), adobe brick (upper walls)
- Height: Site sits approximately 30 metres (100 ft) above the Hrazdan River
- Area: 6 ha (15 acres)
- Excavation dates: 1936-1938, 1958-1980, 2000-2008, 2009-2010, 2012
- Archaeologists: Yevgeny Bayburdyan (1936-1938), Sandro Sardaryan (1958-1980), Hakob Simonyan (2000-2008), Mitchell S. Rothman (2009-2010, 2012)
- Condition: Extant foundations
- Owner: City of Yerevan, public property
- Management: Shengavit Historical & Archaeological-Preserve; entry fee required (1000 AMD museum & grounds + 2000 AMD personal tour guide for RA citizens)
- Public access: Yes
- Website: http://www.erebuni.am/index.php?option=com_content&view=article&id=1243&Itemid=685&lang=en

The Shengavit Settlement (Armenian: Շենգավիթ հնավայր, Shengavit' hənavayr) is an archaeological site in present-day Yerevan, Armenia (in Shengavit administrative district) located on a hill south-east of Yerevan Lake. It was inhabited during a series of settlement phases from around 3000 BC cal to 2500 BC cal in the Kura–Araxes (Shengavitian) period of the Early Bronze Age and irregularly re-used until 2200 BC cal. The town occupied an area of six hectares. It appears that Shengavit was a societal center for the areas surrounding the town due to its unusual size, evidence of surplus production of grains, and metallurgy, as well as its monumental 4 meter wide stone wall. Three smaller village sites of Moukhannat Tepe, Khorumbulagh, and Tairov have been identified and were located outside the walls of Shengavit. Its pottery makes it a type site of the Kura-Araxes or Early Transcaucasian Period and the Shengavitian culture area.

The name Shengavit is composed of Armenian "shen" ("շեն" meaning "prosperous") and "gavit" ("գավիթ" meaning "narthex", "parish") and is the name of the village that was on the territory of the settlement.

== History of excavation ==
The area of modern day Shengavit has been populated since at least 3000 BC, during the period of Kura–Araxes culture of the Late Chalcolithic through Early Bronze Age. Excavations at the Shengavit historical site started in 1936 under the guidance of archaeologist Evegni Bayburdian who dug a trial trench at the hill which in turn led to further archaeological work to be done at the site. Archaeologist Sandro A. Sardarian resumed the excavations in 1958 but his work was poorly documented. He left insufficient records to pinpoint exact locations where artefacts were found.

In 2000, extensive excavation process was launched under the guidance of archaeologist Hakop Simonyan, who dug stratigraphic trenches at the edges of the old trenches excavated by Bayburdian and Sardarian.

In 2009, professor Simonyan was joined by professor Mitchell S. Rothman from Widener University of Pennsylvania. Together they conducted three series of excavations in 2009, 2010, and 2012 respectively. During the process, a full stratigraphic column to bedrock was reached, showing there to be 8 or 9 distinct stratigraphic levels. These levels cover the time between 3200 BC and 2500 BC. Evidence of later use of the site (until 2200 BC) was also found. The excavation process revealed a series of large buildings, round buildings with square adjoining rooms and simple round buildings. Particularly notable are a series of ritual installations discovered in 2010 and 2012.

In July 2010, Simonyan announced that horse bones were found at the site. German paleo-zoologist Hans-Peter Uerpmann stated that many of these bones were from disturbed contexts, however, and the earliest clearly provenanced horse bone's come from Simonyan's Middle Bronze excavations at Nerkin Naver.

A popular press source unfortunately has been cited misstating information from a 2010 press conference in Yerevan. In that conference Rothman described the Uruk Expansion trading network, and the likelihood that raw materials and technologies from the South Caucasus had reached the Mesopotamian homeland, which somehow was misinterpreted to say that Armenian culture was a source of Mesopototamian culture, which is not true. The Kura Araxes (Shengavitian) cultures and societies are a unique mountain phenomenon, evolved parallel to but not the same as Mesopotamian cultures.

== Settlement plan ==
Archaeologists so far have uncovered large cyclopean walls with towers that surrounded the settlement. Within these walls were circular and square multi-dwelling buildings constructed of stone and mud-brick. Inside some of the residential structures were ritual hearths and household pits, while large silos located nearby stored wheat and barley for the residents of the town. There was also an underground passage that led to the river from the town. Earlier excavations had uncovered burial mounds outside the settlement walls towards the south-east and south-west. More ancient graves still remain in the same vicinity.

== Portable finds ==
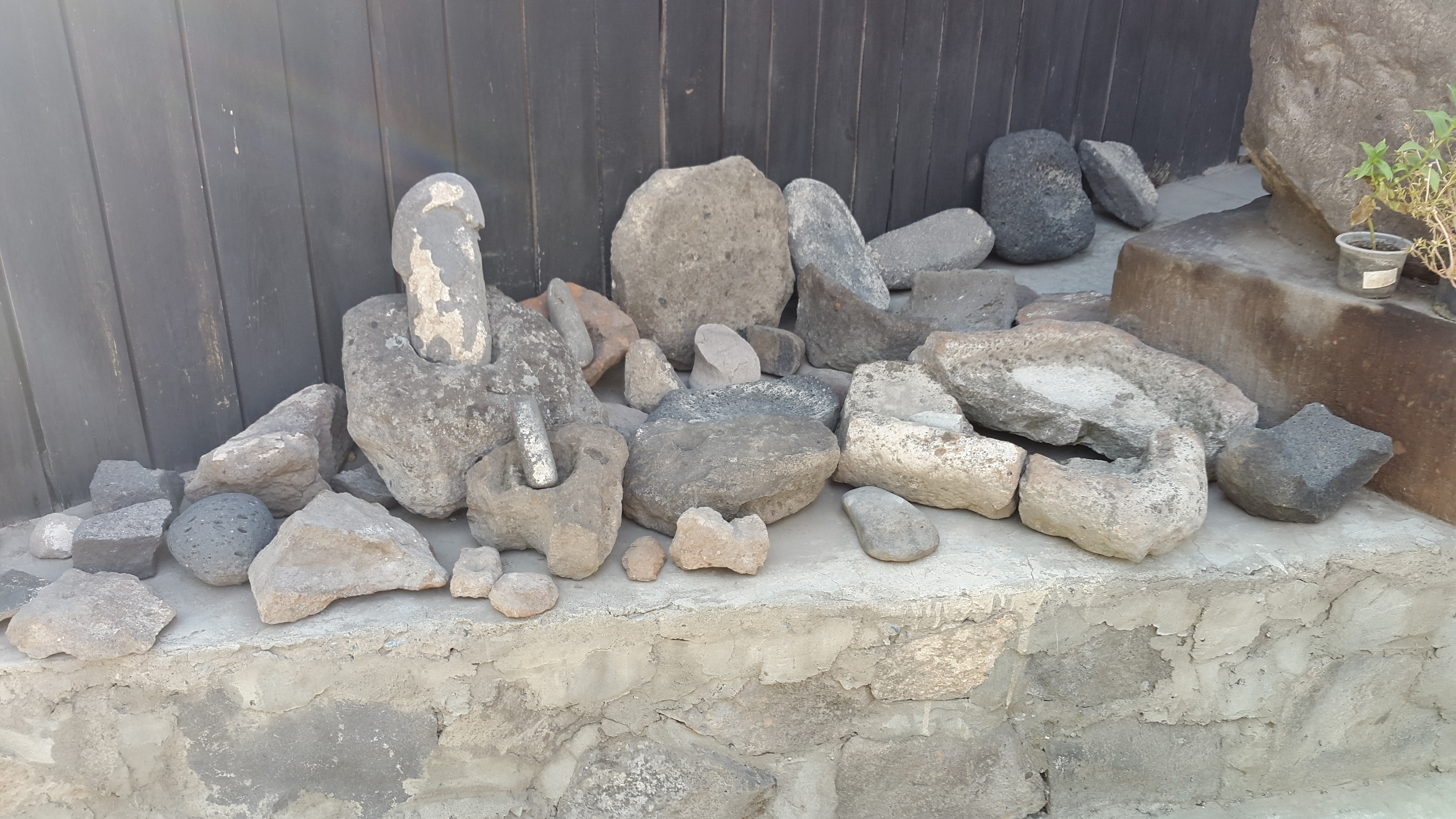
Stone tools from the Shengavit settlement

Amongst the finds during archaeological excavations at Shengavit were chert and obsidian stone tools, mace heads, hoes, hammers, grinders, spindle whorls, spearheads, flakers, needles, pottery, and crucibles (which could hold 10 kg of smelted metal). Storage containers for smelted metal were found as well that held far greater amounts than the town should have required. Large quantities of debris from flint and obsidian knapping, pottery making, metallurgy, and weapons manufacture indicate that the town had organized guilds which performed such tasks. Pottery found at the town typically has a characteristic black burnished exterior and reddish interior with either incised or raised designs. This style defines the period, and is found across the mountainous Early Transcaucasian territories. One of the larger styles of pottery has been identified as a wine vat but residue tests will confirm this notion.

A large stone obelisk was discovered in one of the structures during earlier excavations. A similar obelisk was uncovered at the site of Mokhrablur four km south of Ejmiatsin. It is thought that this, and the numerous statuettes made of clay that have been found are part of a central ritualistic practice in Shengavit.

== Shengavit Museum ==
The Shengavit branch of the Erebuni Historical & Archaeological Culture-Preserve was founded on May 24, 1968. The discoveries from the famous archaeological site of Shengavit, spanning 18 collections, make up an inextricable part of the museum's Historical & Archaeological Culture-Preserve collection.

== Gallery ==
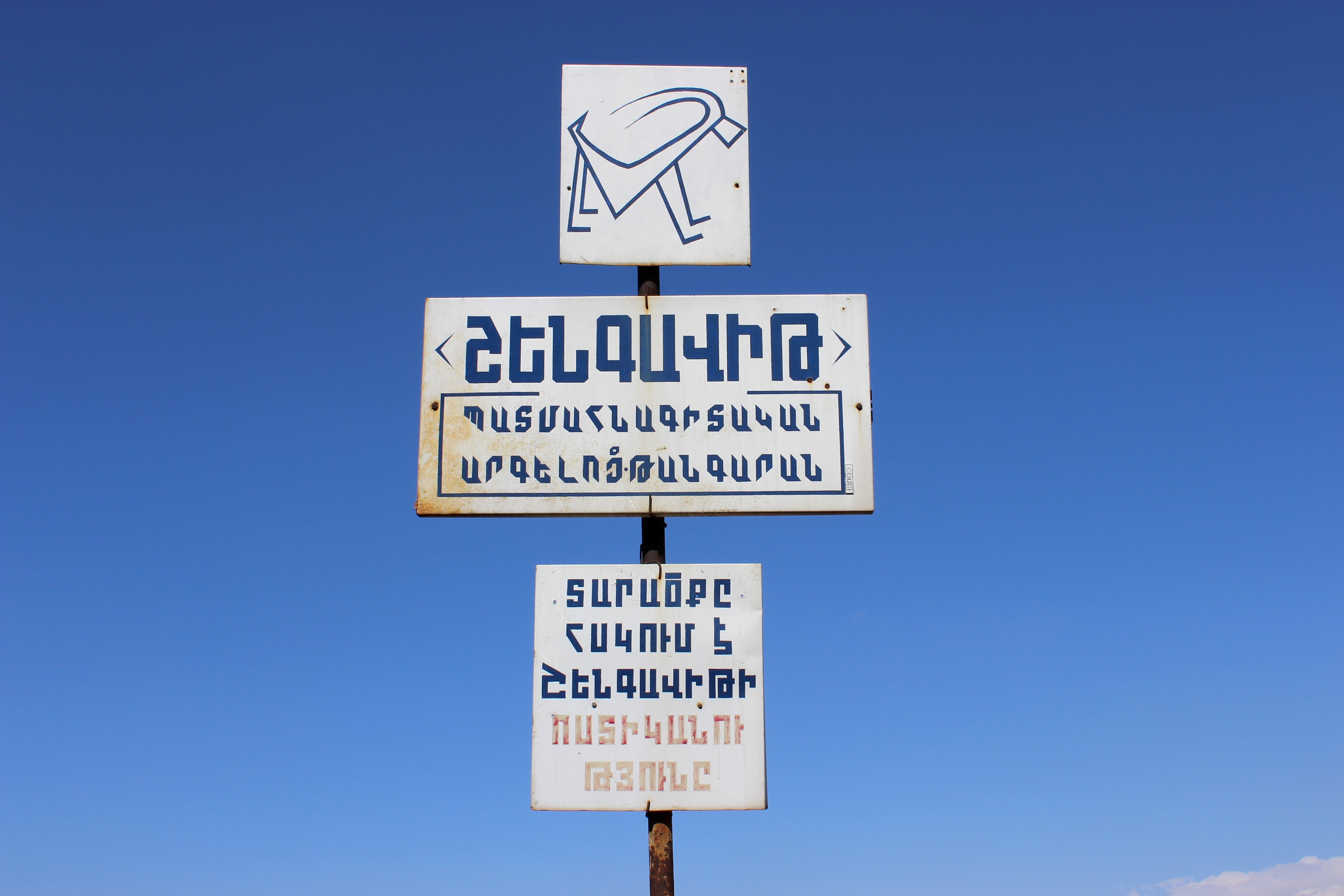
Signage at Shengavit

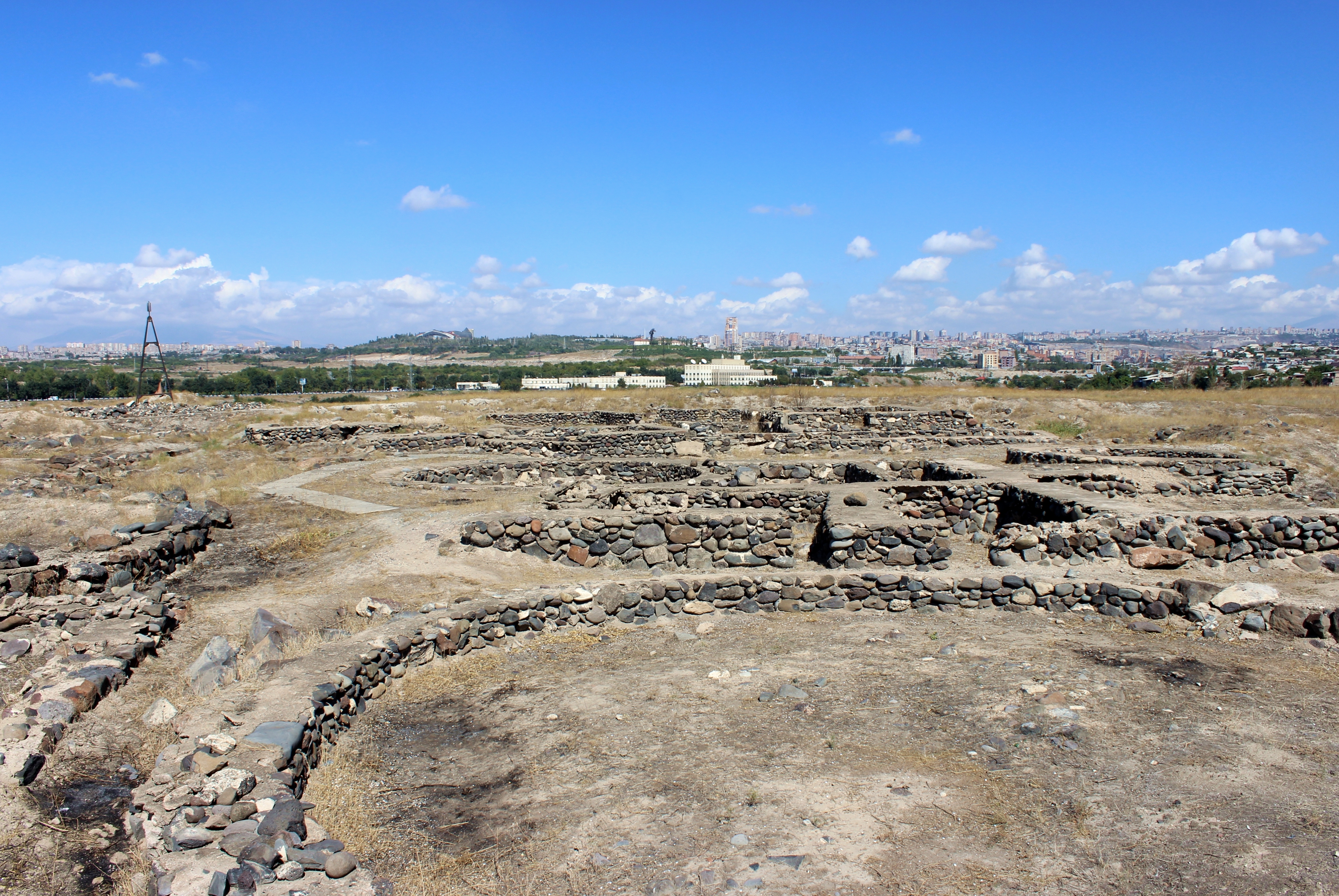
Archaeological site at Shengavit

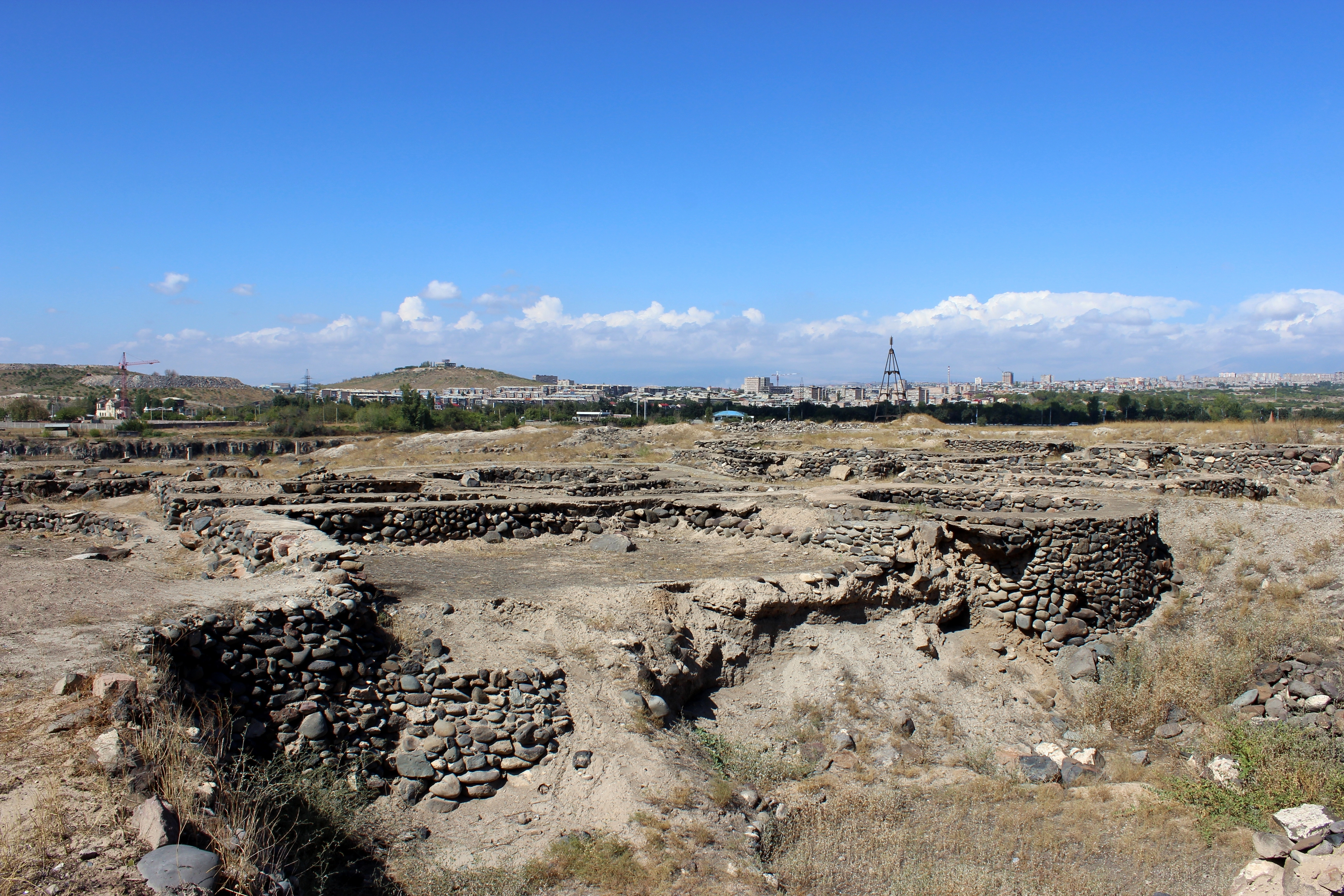
Archaeological site at Shengavit

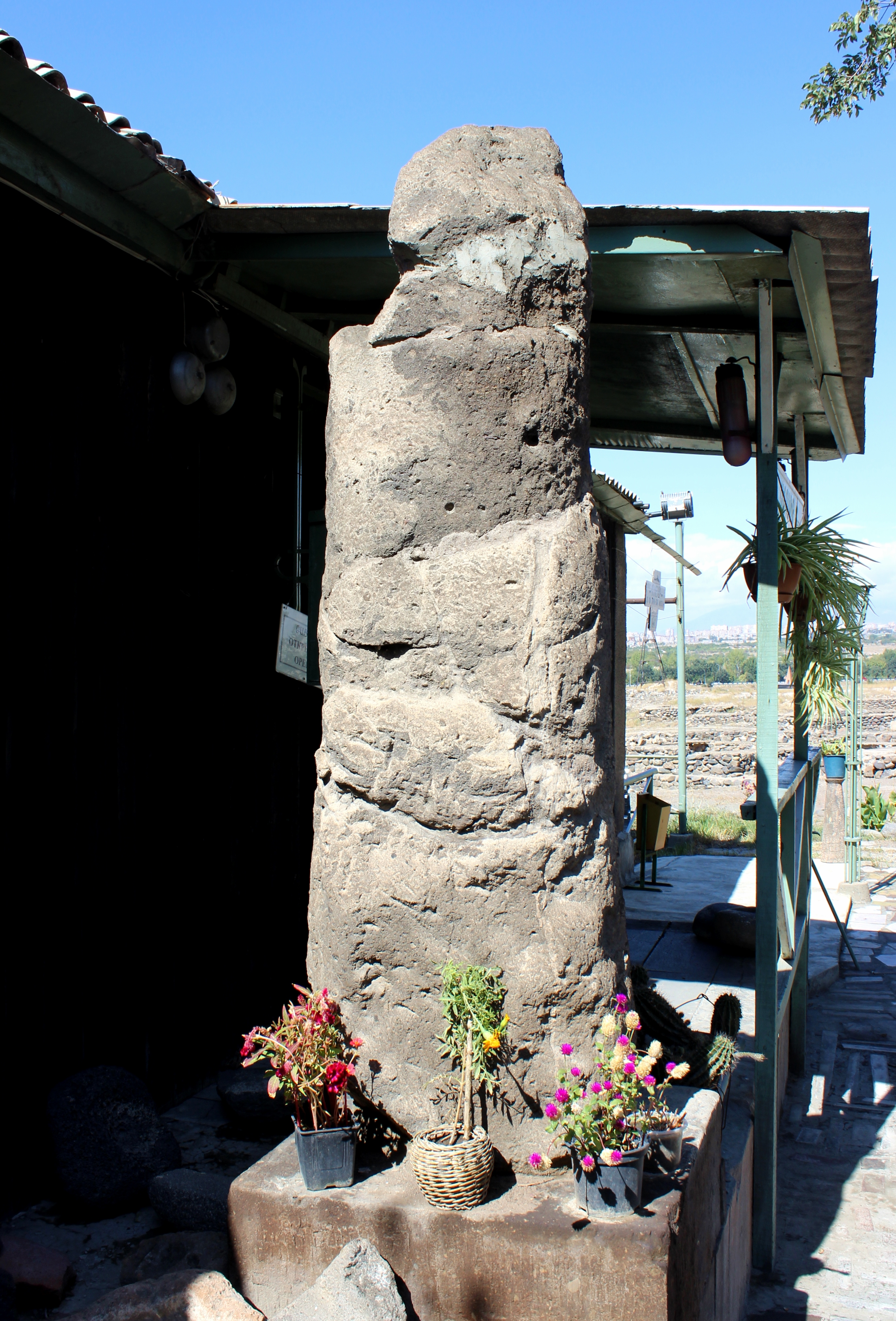
Phallic stone monument found at the site

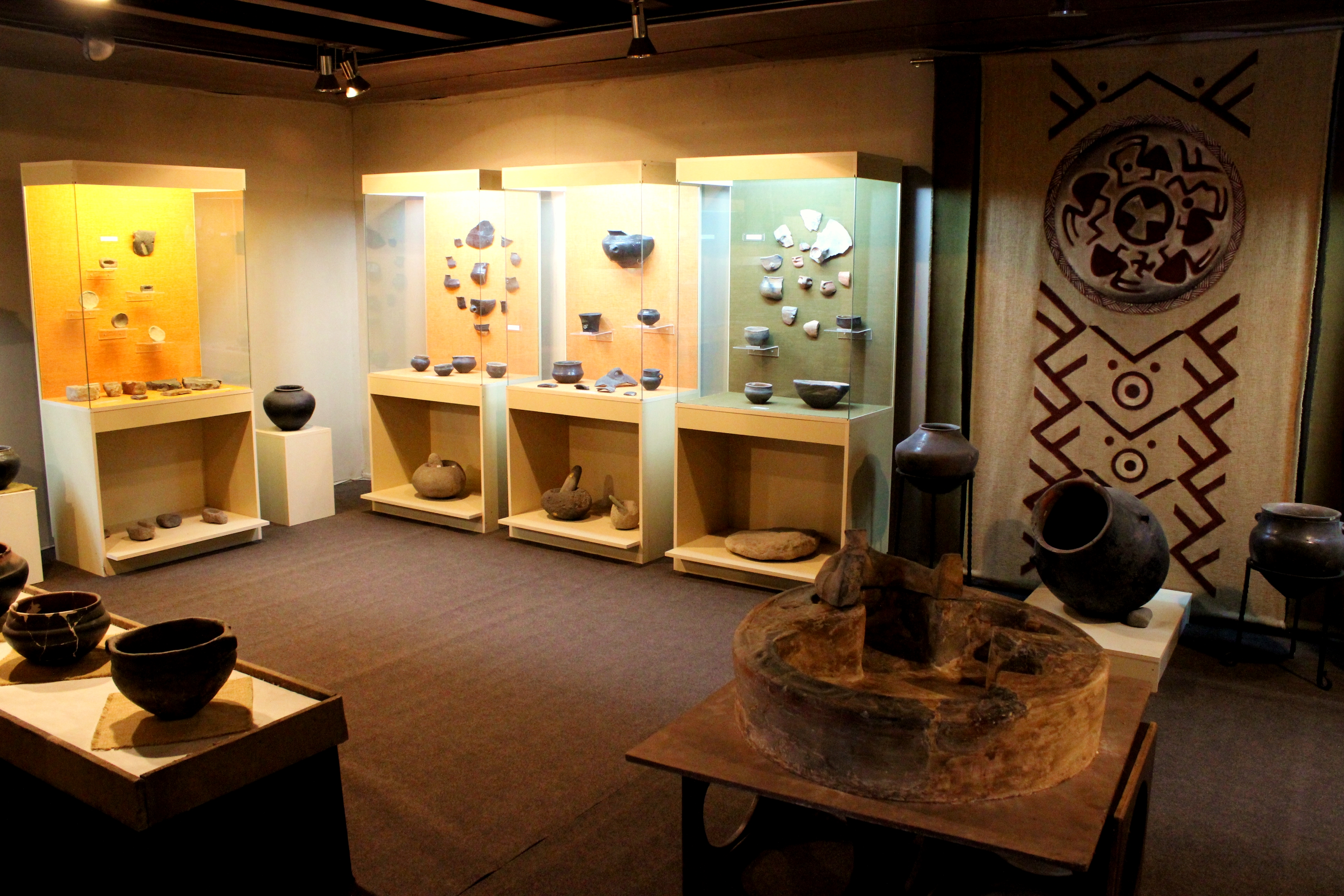

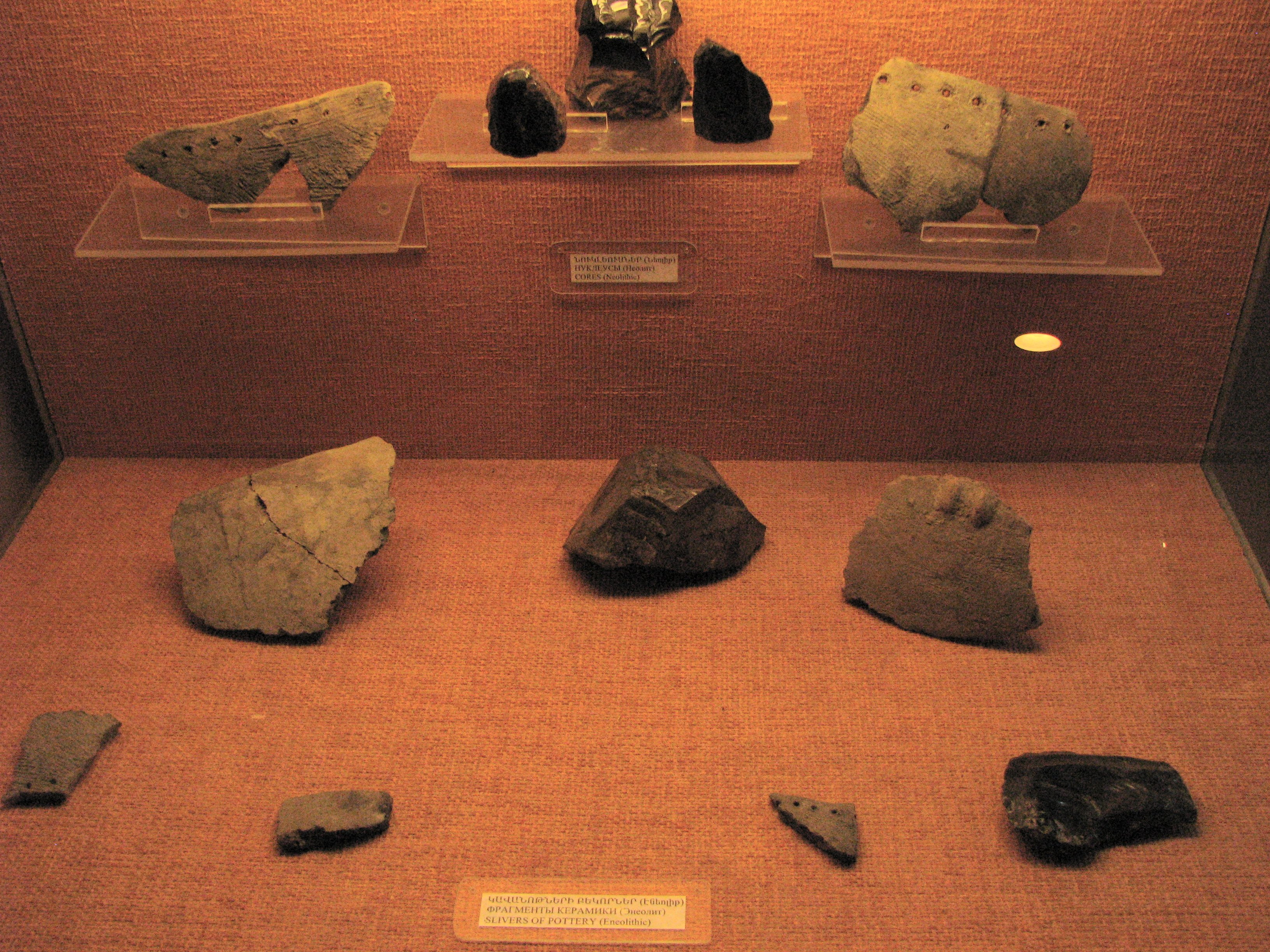
Shengavit Museum

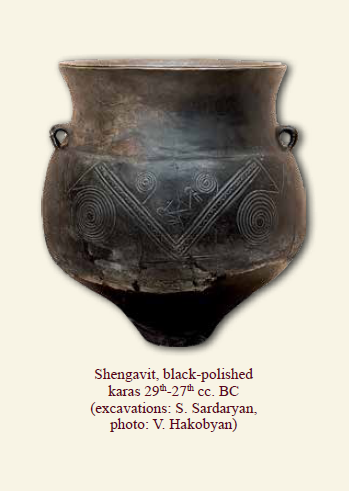
black-polished karas 29th-27th centurys BC.

== See also ==
- Metsamor Castle
- Teishebaini
- Erebuni Fortress
