= Türkoba, Masally =

Türkoba
- Municipality
- Location within Azerbaijan
- Coordinates: 38°52′46″N 48°42′13″E
- Country: Azerbaijan
- Rayon: Masally

Population (2009)
  - Total: 2,662
- Time zone: UTC+4
  - Summer (DST): UTC+5
- Kodlar (code): 30604028

Türkoba (also, Tyurkoba) is a town in Masally Rayon, Azerbaijan. As of 2009 it had a population of 2,662.
