= Margahovit =

Margahovit Մարգահովիտ
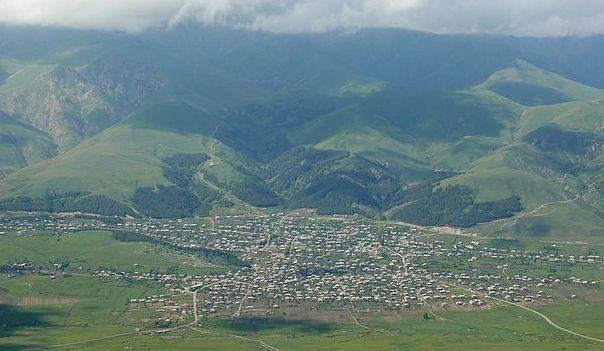

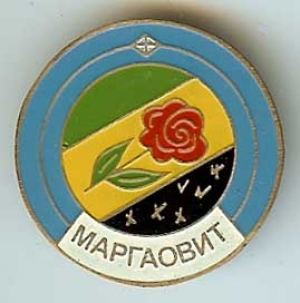
- Coat of arms

- Location within Armenia
- Coordinates: 40°44′17″N 44°41′15″E
- Country: Armenia
- Province: Lori
- Elevation: 1,750 m (5,740 ft)

Population (2011)
  - Total: 3,466

Margahovit (Armenian: Մարգահովիտ, formerly Hamzachiman), is a major village in the Lori Province of Armenia.
