= İkinci Yaşma =

- Location within Azerbaijan
- Coordinates: 40°43′05″N 49°30′43″E
- Country: Azerbaijan
- Rayon: Khizi
- Time zone: UTC+4 (AZT)
  - Summer (DST): UTC+5 (AZT)

İkinci Yaşma is a coastal village in the Khizi Rayon of Azerbaijan.
