= Şorabad, Khizi =

Şorabad
- Municipality
- Location within Azerbaijan
- Coordinates: 40°49′08″N 49°28′19″E
- Country: Azerbaijan
- Rayon: Khizi

Population
  - Total: 2,232
- Time zone: UTC+4 (AZT)
  - Summer (DST): UTC+5 (AZT)

Şorabad, Şuraabad (?-2018) (also, Mikhailabad, Shuraabad, Sovetabad, and Soviet Abad) is a village and municipality in the Khizi Rayon of Azerbaijan. It has a population of 2,232. The municipality consists of the villages of Şuraabad, Yaşma, and Türkoba.
