= Xətai, Babek =

Xətai
- Location within Azerbaijan
- Coordinates: 39°12′57″N 45°25′17″E
- Country: Azerbaijan
- Autonomous republic: Nakhchivan
- District: Babek
- Time zone: UTC+4 (AZT)

Xətai (also, Khatai and Khetayi, known as Sovetabad until 2000) is a village in the Babek District of the Nakhchivan Autonomous Republic of Azerbaijan.

== Etymology ==
Its previous name was Sovetabad. It was established in the meaning of "Soviet village" during the years of Soviet power. Since 2000, the village was named Xətai (Khatai) in honor of the notable Azerbaijani statesman and poet Shakh Ismail Khatai, founder of the Azerbaijani Safavid State.
