= Arpaçay, Azerbaijan =

Arpaçay
- Municipality
- Location within Azerbaijan
- Coordinates: 39°31′N 44°59′E
- Country: Azerbaijan
- Autonomous republic: Nakhchivan
- District: Sharur

Population (2005)
  - Total: 579
- Time zone: UTC+4 (AZT)

Arpaçay (also, Arpachay; until 2003, Sovetabad and Shuraabad) is a village and municipality in the Sharur District of Nakhchivan Autonomous Republic, Azerbaijan. It is located 4 km in the south-east from the district center, on the right bank of the Arpachay River. Its population is busy with horticulture, vegetable-growing, farming and animal husbandry. There are secondary school, library, club and a medical center in the village. It has a population of 579.

== Etymology ==
The name of the village is related with the name of the Arpaçay River which is the flowing near the Arpaçay (Arpachay) village. In the toponomy of Turkic-speaking peoples, distinguishing by its richness the component of the arpa (barley), along with revealing the name of one of the cereal plants, also is expressed in the name of an ancient Turkic tribe in used variants of arma / arba / arpa. In terms of relief, the areas in which is possible to cultivation a barley plant if related with the cereal, then, the heights, the water basins are expressed with the homonym. There exist a thousands the object name in the toponomy which is related with word of "arpa": Arpa dağı "Arpa Mountain" (Ağsu, Şəmkir), Arpa dərəsi "Arpa Valley" (Oğuz, Ağdam, Qubadlı, Daşkəsən, Qazax, Zəngilan, Kəlbəcər, Goranboy, Ordubad, Göygöl), Arpa düzü "Arpa plain" (Çovdar village of Kəlbəcər), Arpa yalı "Arpa hill" (Kəlbəcər, Şuşa), Arpaçı günbəzi "dome of Arpacı" (Cəbrayıl), Arpa çökəyi "pit of Arpa" (Tovuz, Göygöl), Arpa çuxuru "Arpa cavity" (Qubadlı) all are in the Azerbaijan; Arpa, Arpa kəndi "village of Arpa" (since 1946 Areni), Arpa çayı "Arpa River" (since 1957 Akhurian), Arpa Gölü "Arpa Lake" (since 1950 Arpi), Arpavad (since 1945 Khusakert), Arpavar / Arpava (since 1967 Nshavan) in the Armenia; Arpaqala, Arpaşen in the Kars (Turkey); Arpatala, Arpa kəndi (village of Arpa) in the Georgia; Arpalar in the Crimea; Arpa suyu "Arpa water" in the Kazakhstan, etc. In 1933, the Arpalıqkəndi (village of Arpalıq) have been registered in the Cəlilabad region.
