= List of Armenian churches in Azerbaijan =

List of Armenian Apostolic churches in Azerbaijan.

== Baku ==
- Saint Thaddeus and Bartholomew Cathedral - destroyed
- Church of the Holy Virgin (18th century) - destroyed
- St. Gregory the Illuminator's Church (1887) - closed, used as a library

== Dashkasan ==
- Targmanchats Monastery (4-5th centuries) - ruin
- Church of the Holy Virgin, Chiragidzor - destroyed

== Ganja ==
- Church of St. Karapet (Middle Ages) - ruin
- Church of St. John the Baptist (1633) - destroyed
- Church of the All-Savior (17th century) - destroyed; in its place is a medical college
- Church of Saint Sargis church (18th century) - destroyed
- Church of the Holy Mother of God (18th century) - destroyed
- Church of St. Thaddaeus (18th century - destroyed; in the place of the church is a cinema

== Shaki ==
- Church of Kish

== Nakhchivan Autonomous Republic ==
Nakhichevan cultural sites map

A complete list of known Armenian Apostolic churches in Nakhichevan built since the adoption of Christianity in Armenia would include more than 280 churches. Recent reports have alleged that probably all of the Armenian churches in Nakhchivan that were still standing in the decade before the collapse of the Soviet Union were destroyed by Azerbaijan in the aftermath of the Nagorno-Karabakh war. A 2006 report about a visit made to Nakhchivan in 2005 stated that of the five churches visited all were found to have been completely destroyed, in particular the 14th-century St. Karapet monastery in Abrakunis, and the 17th-century St. Hakop-Hayrapet church in Shurut. Azerbaijan has repeatedly barred on-site investigation of the condition of Armenian monuments in the region by outside groups.

Armenians divided the region into 5 gavars (regions): Goghtn, Yernjak, Nakhichevan, Chahuk-Shahaponq and Sharur.

=== Goghtn region ===
Number of known Armenian churches in Goghtn was 94.

Name	Name	Name
St. Stepanos, Vorduar (Ordubad)	St. Yerrordutyun, Aşağı Əylis	St. Nshan, Aşağı Əylis
Metz Astvatsatsin, Aşağı Əylis	St. Tovma monastery, Yuxarı Əylis	St. Stepanos, Yuxarı Əylis (ru)
St. Kristopor, Yuxarı Əylis (ru)	St. Shmavon, Yuxarı Əylis	St. Hovhannes Mkrtich, Yuxarı Əylis
St. Hakob, Yuxarı Əylis	St. Tovma monastery, Vənənd	St. Hovhannes, Berdak
St. Astvatsatsin, Tanakert	St. Stepanos, Qaxaqik	St. Khach, Nunis
St. Stepanos monastery, Mtsghun	St. Astvatsatsin, Çənnəb	St. Sargis, Çənnəb
St. Astvatsatsin, Ramis	St. Astvatsatsin, Der	St. Hakob, Parağa
St. Shmavon, Parağa	St. Stepanos, Navish	St. Stepanos, Shrju
St. Nshan Anapat, Bist	St. Astvatsatsin, Bist	St. Stepanos, Voghohi
St. Grigor or St. Mesrop Mashtots monaster, Mesropavan (ru)	St. Astvatsatsin, Xurs	St. Thargmanchats monastery, Nürgüt
"Presentation to the temple"	St. Stepanos	St. Hripsime
St. Astvatsastin	St. Karapet	St. Hakob (St. Stepanos)
Sineakan Anapat or St. Hovhannes	St. Stepanos	"Pasture’s sanctuary" chapel church
St. Sargis chapel church	St. Minas chapel church	St. Koomsi or Amenaprkich
St. Minas	Poqr Astvatsatsin or Kusastan	St. Teodoros (Tevan-Toros)
St. Hripsime	St. Minas	St. Khoran
St. Hakob	St. Karapet	St. Astvatsatsin
St. Khach or Andzrevaber	St. Loussik chapel	St. Astvatsatsin
St. Gevorg	St. Hakob	St. Stepanos
St. Astvatsatsin chapel church	St. Sargis chapel church	St. Astvatsatsin
St. Gevorg	St. Arakyal	St. Minas
St. Gevorg	St. Nshan	St. Hisoos
St. Karapet	St. Hakob	St. Sargis
St. Karapet chapel church	St. Sargis Monastery	St. Sargis chapel church
St. Astvatsatsin	St. Astvatsatsin	St. Karapet
St. Hakob	St. Kristopor	St. Nshan
St. Gevorg or Dzoravanq Anapat	St. Stepanos Monastery	St. Astvatsatsin
St. Astvatsatsin	St. Tovma Monastery	St. Sargis
St. Karapet chapel church	St. Khach or Hripsime	St. Karapet
St. Hripsime chapel church	St. Astvatsatsin	St. Gayane chapel
Sari St. Nshan chapel church	St. Sargis	St. Karapet
St. Astvatsatsin		

=== Yernjak ===
Number of known Armenian churches in Ernjak was 68.

Name	Name	Name
St. Grigor, Gagh	St. Hakob, Şurud	St. Grigor, Shorot
St. Astvatsatsin, Shorot	St. Stepanos, Poradasht	St. Hakob, Nerqin Ankuziq
St. Sargis, Mijin Ankuziq	St. Gevorg, Jugha	Amenaprkich Monastery, Jugha
Pomboloz Zham, Jugha	St. Karapet, Əbrəqunus	St. Astvatsatsin, Krna
St. Astvatsatsin, Norashen	St. Amenaprkich, Sahkert	St. Astvatsatsin
St. Hripsime or Nahatak	St. Gayane	St. Anapat Monastery
St. Yeghia chapel	St. Sargis chapel church	St. Nshan
St. Yeghia Margare chapel	St. Sargis chapel	St. Geghard
St. Stepanos	St. Tadevos	St. Karapet
St. Astvatsatsin	St. Gevorg	St. Yeghia chapel
St. Hovhannes chapel	St. Astvatsatsin	St. Astvatsatsin
St. Karapet	St. Hakob	St. Gevorg
St. Hovhannes Hreshtakapetats	St. Astvatsatsin	St. Astvatsatsin
St. Poghos-Petros	St. Gevorg	St. Hripsime monastery
St. Hovhannes	St. Karapet chapel	St. Sargis
St. Khach monastery	St. Astvatsatsin chapel church	St. Gevorg
St. Stepanos	St. Astvatsatsin	St. Hakob
Amenayn Srbots Monastery	St. Hovhannes	St. Gevorg
St. Gevorg monastery	St. Hovhannes	St. Stepanos
St. Hovhannes	St. Hovhannes	St. Astvatsatsin
St. Astvatsatsin	St. Kristapor	St. Stepanos
St. Hakob	St. Karapet	St. Grigor
St. Astvatsatsin	St. Stepanos	St. Karapet

=== Nakhichevan ===
Number of known Armenian churches in Nakhichevan gavar was 34.

Name	Name	Name
St. Stepanos or karmir Vanq, Astapat	St. Vardan, Astapat	St. Minas, Emkhana
St. Hovhannes, Tambat	St. Hovhannes, Hajivar	St. Yerrordutyun, Nakhijevan
St. Gevorg, Nakhijevan	St. Astvatsatsin, Alipat	St. Astvatsatin, Shmrthan
St. Hripsime, Qyulthapa	St. Grigor, Aznaberd	St. Hakob, Aznaberd
St. Tovma, Aznaberd	St. Hovhannes, Aznabyurd	St. Karapet
St. Astvatsatsin	St. Gevorg	St. Poghos-Petros
St. Hovhannes	St. Hovhannes	St. Astvatsatsin
St. Stepanos	St. Gevorg	St. Astvatsatsin
St. Astvatsatsin	St. Hripsime	St. Gevorg
St. Astvatsatsin	St. Sargis	St. Astvatsatsin
St. Sargis	St. Hakob	St. Astvatsatsin
St. Astvatsatsin

=== Chahuk-Shahaponq ===
Number of known Armenian churches in Chahuk-Shahaponq was 71.

Name	Name	Name
St. Grigor, Qeolq	St. Khach, Agarak	St. Yerrordutyun, Nors
St. Astvatsatsin, Kzhadzor	St. Grigor, Gomer •	St. Nshan or Hazarabyurats, Kuqi
St. Astvatsatsin, Otsop	St. Stepanos, Otsop	St. Khach monastery, Shamen
St. Hovhannes, Chahuk	St. Astvatsatsin	St. Khach
St. Hovhannes	St. Minas	St. Astvatsatsin
St. Hakob	St. Hovhannes	St. Karapet
St. Grigor	St. Astvatsatsin	St. Hovhannes
St. Astvatsatsin	St. Stepanos	St. Sargis
St. Arjakap	St. Stepanos chapel	St. Grigor
St. Hakob	St. Astvatsatsin	St. Khach or Guyut Monastery
Tookh Manuk chapel	Dziarat chapel	St. Yerrordutyun (Kapuyt Khaz) chapel
St. Karapet	Hovvahayr chapel	St. Sargis chapel church
St. Martiros "Hazaraprkich" monastery	St. Grigor	St. Astvatsatsin
Anapat chapel	St. Karapet chapel	Kapuyt Khaz chapel
St. Astvatsatsin	St. Grigor	St. Stepanos
St. Astvatsatsin	Kuys Varvara chapel	Karkarayi chapel
St. Astvatsatsin	St. Grigor	St. Hakob
St. Astvatsatsin	St. Grigor	St. Stepanos
St. Vardan	St. Sargis	St. Astvatsatsin
St. Shoghakat	St. Karapet chapel church	St. Sargis
St. Astvatsatsin	St. Astvatsatsin	St. Grigor
St. Karapet	St. Astvatsatsin	St Hovhannes
St. Nahatak	St. Grigor	St. Hripsime chapel
St. Astvatsatsin	St. Astvatsatsin	

=== Sharur ===
Number of known Armenian churches in Sharur was 17.

Name	Name	Name
St. Astvatsatsin	St. Karapet	St Hovhannes
St. Sargis	St. Grigor	St. Astvatsatsin
St. Minas	St Hovhannes	St. Astvatsatsin
St. Sargis	St. Stepanos	St. Petros
St. Astvatsatsin	St. Hakob	St. Sargis
St. Astvatsatsin	St. Astvatsatsin	

=== Nasirvaz ===
- Mesrop Mashtots Monastery

=== Channab ===
- St. Astvatsatsin Monastery

=== Julfa ===
- Holy Saviour Monastery

=== Yukhari Aylis ===
- St. Kristapor Church

=== Shurud ===
- St. Hakob-Hayrapet Church

== Qazakh ==
- Saint Sargis Monastery of Gag - ruin

== Aghdam district ==
- Khachin-Darbatli Mausoleum
- Vankasar Church

== Kalbajar District ==
- Dadivank

== Khojavend District ==
- Amaras Monastery
- Gtichavank
- Katarovank

== Tartar District ==
- Saint John the Baptist Church
- Yerits Mankants Monastery

== See also ==
- Armenian Apostolic Church
