= St. Stepanos Monastery =

St. Stepanos Monastery may refer to several Armenian monasteries:

- Saint Stepanos Monastery or Maghardavank, near Julfa, East Azarbaijan, Iran
- St. Stepanos Monastery (Channab), in Ordubad, Nakhchivan, Azerbaijan
- St. Stepanos Monastery (Hin Poradasht), in Julfa, Nakhchivan, Azerbaijan
- St. Stepanos Monastery (Shurud), in Julfa, Nakhchivan, Azerbaijan
- St. Stepanos Monastery (Tivi), in Ordubad, Nakhchivan, Azerbaijan
