= Mesrob =

Mesrob or Mesrop (Armenian: Մեսրոպ) is an Armenian given name.

Mesrob / Mesrop may refer to:

- Mesrop Mashtots, also Saint Mesrop, Armenian monk, theologian and linguist. Inventor of the Armenian alphabet
  - Mesrop Mashtots Institute of Ancient Manuscripts, known as Matenadaran, a repository of ancient manuscripts, research institute and museum located in Yerevan, Armenia
  - Order of St. Mesrop Mashtots, awarded for significant achievements in Armenia
- Mesrop of Khizan, 16th-17th-century Armenian manuscript illuminator
- Mesrob Nishanian of Jerusalem, Armenian Patriarch of Jerusalem from 1939 to 1944
- Mesrob I Naroyan of Constantinople, Armenian Patriarch of Constantinople from 1927 to 1944
- Mesrob II Mutafyan of Constantinople, Armenian Patriarch of Constantinople from 1998 to 2019
- Mesrop Taghiadian, Armenian writer and educator (1803–1858)
- Mesrovb Jacob Seth, Armenian writer and educator (1871–1939)
- Mesrop Aramian, Armenian priest and scholar (b. 1966)

== See also ==
- Mesropavan, village in Goghtn Region of Armenia, currently included into Ordubad region of Nakhichevan autonomy of Azerbaijan
