= Saint Karapet Monastery of Aprakunis =

Armenian monastery in Aprakunis, Azerbaijan, destroyed in 2004

St. Karapet Monastery of Aprakunis
- Սուրբ Կարապետ վանք (Ապրակունիս)
- Location within Azerbaijan

Religion
- Affiliation: Armenian Apostolic Church
- Rite: Armenian Apostolic
- Ecclesiastical or organisational status: yes
- Status: Destroyed in 2004

Location
- Location: Aprakunis, Nakhchivan Autonomous Republic
- Coordinates: 39°08′06″N 45°38′13″E

Architecture
- Type: Dome basilica
- Style: Armenian
- Completed: 8th-9th century

St. Karapet Monastery of Aprakunis (Armenian: Ապրակունիսի Սուրբ Կարապետ վանք), was an Armenian Apostolic monastery, in the Julfa district of Nakhchivan Autonomous Republic), near the village of Aprakunis.

== History ==
It was founded by the Crimean monk Malakia (hy) in 1381. Gathering students, he invited Hovhan Vorotnetsi (ru) and Grigor Tatevatsi to establish the Aprakunyats higher type school in the monastery, the first head scholar of which was Hovhan Vorotnetsi. The construction of the monastery was completed by Grigor Tatevatsi, who after the death of Hovhan Vorotnetsi in 1386 replaced him as the head scholar, and in 1391, due to the invasion of Timur, was forced to leave Yernjak. During 15th and 16th centuries St. Karapet Church of Aprakunis and its school was in decline, and in 17th century, the church and other buildings were already in a state of disrepair. In 1655, the monks Isaiah and Lazarus built a new church with a four-domed basilica with two-storeyed apses on either side of the tabernacle. The main part of St. Karapet Church was built of polished basalt, and the high, slender drum dome was made of brick. The decoration elements were multicoloured at the bottom of the walls. The name of the architect, David Usta, is mentioned in the inscription above the church tabernacle. In 1664–1666, a three-arched vestibule-hall (now a ruin) was attached to the western facade. Adjacent from the south was a vaulted, long St. Stephen chapel. According to the inscription, it was built in 1714 by Khoja Ayvaz, a merchant from Shorot. In 1705, Mr. Aghamal from Nakhchivan built a two-story bell tower on the roof of St. Stephen Chapel. Inside St. Karapet Church It was built in 1714 by Khoja Ayvaz, a merchant from Shorot. In 1705, Aghamal of Nakhchivan built a two-story bell tower on the roof of St. Stepanos Chapel. Inside St. Karapet Church It was built in 1714 by Khoja Ayvaz, a merchant from Shorot. In 1705, Mr. Aghamal from Nakhchivan built a two-story bell tower on the roof of St. Stepanos Chapel. The sons of Naghash Hovnatan, Harutyun and Hakob, decorated interior of St. Karapet Church with high-art frescoes in 1740, and the portraits of the Virgin Mary, Paul and Peter were the best preserved parts. St. Karapet Monastery of Aprakunis between 14th to 18th centuries was a cultural and writing centre. Among the manuscripts written here, there are manuscripts of Grigor Narekatsi, Grigor Tgha and others from the collection copied by Hakob Grch in 1386. The monastery was a renowned place of pilgrimage for healing of snake bite. The relics of St. Karapet and St. Hovhan Voskeberan, the Thousand Saviour Cross, which were taken to affected areas during epidemics were kept in St. Karapet Church in Aprakunis.

== Current status ==
The main church of the monastic complex was still standing in the 1980s. The church and whatever was remaining from the monastic complex was already totally erased by October 7, 2001. On May 31, 2013, a newly constructed mosque was opened on the place of the former monastery.

== See also ==
- List of Armenian churches in Azerbaijan
