= Trunis =

Trunis (Armenian: Տրունիս, Russian: Трунис), is a village in Goghtn Region of Armenia, currently included into Ordubad region of Nakhchivan autonomy of Azerbaijan.

The ruins of the St. Khach Monastery lie within the village. There is a rock near the village considered a place for pilgrimage.

== See also ==
Dırnıs
