= Avey =

Avey is an English surname. Notable people with this surname include:

- Albert Edwin Avey (1886–1963), American philosopher
- Dan Avey (1941–2010), American media personality
- Denis Avey (1919–2015), British Hero of the Holocaust
- Fred Avey, English footballer
- Linda Avey (born 1960), American biologist and entrepreneur
- Sam Avey (1895–1962), American sports promoter

== As a given name ==
- Avey Tare (born 1979), American musician

== Other ==
- Avey temple
- Avey's Coliseum
- Avey Field State Airport or AFSA
- FC Avey Akstafa or FK Avei Agstafa

== See also ==
- Aveyard, a surname
- Aveyron (disambiguation)
