= Inmer =

Coordinates: 39.2258°N 45.9478°E

Inmer (Armenian: Ինմեր, Russian: Инмер), also known as Aznamir (Armenian: Ազնամիր, Russian: Азнамир) is a village in Goghtn Region of Armenia, included into Ordubad region of Nakhichevan autonomy of Azerbaijan.

Ruins of Armenian church has remained though Armenian population left the village in 19th century.
