= St. Shmavon Church (Paragha) =

Armenian church in Nakhchivan, Azerbaijan

- Սուրբ Շմավոն եկեղեցի
- St. Shmavon Church
- Location: Parağa
- Country: Azerbaijan
- Denomination: Armenian Apostolic Church

History
- Status: Destroyed
- Founded: 12–13th centuries

Architecture
- Style: Basilica
- Demolished: 1997–2000

St. Shmavon Church was an Armenian church located in Parağa village (Ordubad district) of the Nakhchivan Autonomous Republic of Azerbaijan. The church was located in the central part of the village.

== History ==
The church was founded in the 12–13th centuries. It was renovated in 1680, according to an Armenian inscription on the lintel of the southern doorway.

== Architecture ==
St. Shmavon was a basilica with gabled roof and consisted of a nave with two aisles, an apse with two-storied vestries on either side, and a vaulted porch at the west. There were Armenian inscriptions and sculptures under the arch of the southern entrance, while the walls showed traces of wall paintings.

== Destruction ==
The church was well preserved in the later Soviet period and was razed to ground at some point between 1997 and February 3, 2000, as documented by investigation of the Caucasus Heritage Watch. By July 20, 2016, a garden and several new buildings had been installed on the former church site.
