= St. Hovhannes Church (Dyrnys) =

Armenian church in Ordubad, Nakhchivan, Azerbaijan

- Սուրբ Հովհաննես եկեղեցի
- St. Hovhannes Church
- Location: Dırnıs
- Country: Azerbaijan
- Denomination: Armenian Apostolic Church

History
- Status: Destroyed

Architecture
- Demolished: 1997–2000

St. Hovhannes Church was an Armenian church located on a hill in the center of the former village of Berdak, near the current Dyrnys village (Ordubad district) of the Nakhchivan Autonomous Republic of Azerbaijan.

== History ==
The date of the construction of the church is unclear, however, the date 1625 appeared on a few cross-stones (khachkars) that were embedded in the church walls. An Armenian inscription in the church attests to renovations in 1888.

== Architectural characteristics ==
The church was a small, vaulted building with a single-chamber nave, an apse in the east and a single doorway in the southern facade. A hall built along the southern facade may have served as a vestry or bell tower. Armenian inscriptions were set in the eastern and southern walls.

== Destruction ==
The church was still standing in the early 1980s. However, it was partially ruined at that time. According to investigation of the Caucasus Heritage Watch, the church was destroyed by February 3, 2000, it remained a vacant plot until 2019 when the Allahshukur Mosque was built on the grounds of the former church. The mosque was built in honor of the Sheikh ul-Islam and Grand Mufti of the Caucasus, Allahshukur Pashazadeh.
