= St. Targmanchats Monastery (Nurgut) =

Armenian monastery in Nakhchivan, Azerbaijan

Coordinates: 39.2234°N 45.89926°E

- Սուրբ Թարգմանչաց վանք
- St. Targmanchats Monastery
- Location: Nürgüt
- Country: Azerbaijan
- Denomination: Armenian Apostolic Church

History
- Status: Destroyed
- Founded: 1662

Architecture
- Demolished: 1997–2006

St. Targmanchats Monastery was an Armenian monastery located in Nürgüt village (Ordubad district) of the Nakhchivan Autonomous Republic of Azerbaijan. It was located in the central part of the village.

== History ==
The monastery was founded in 1662.

== Architectural characteristics ==
The church of the monastery was a basilica with a nave, two aisles, an apse and two vestries.

== Destruction ==
The church was still standing in the 1980s and was destroyed at some point by June 15, 2006, as documented by the Caucasus Heritage Watch.
