= Dırnıs =

Village and municipality in Ordubad, Nakhchivan, Azerbaijan

- Municipality
- Location within Azerbaijan
- Coordinates: 38°59′10″N 45°58′45″E
- Country: Azerbaijan
- Autonomous republic: Nakhchivan
- District: Ordubad

Population (2005)
  - Total: 1,470
- Time zone: UTC+4 (AZT)

Dırnıs (also, Dyrnys, Dernis) is a village and municipality in the Ordubad District of Nakhchivan, Azerbaijan. It is located in the near of the Ordubad-Unus highway, 29 km in the north-east from the district center, on the bank of the Venend River. Its population is busy with gardening, vegetable-growing and farming. There is a secondary school, club, library, culture house, medical center and the mosque of the Middle Ages in the village. It has a population of 1,470. In the territory of the village, in the cemetery were medieval a stone ram statues on the graves.

== Dırnıs mosque ==
Dırnıs mosque - the mosque in the Dırnıs village of the Ordubad region. The mosque was compact in terms of the architecture composition and was reflected in the itself of the features of style and typological of the 18th–19th centuries. The mosque has a sanctuary, windows with lattice; the pillars are from the hewed wood materials.

== Monuments ==
There was an Armenian church near the village, St. Hovhannes Church, which was destroyed by February 2000.

== Notable natives ==
- Huseyn Mammadov — Chairmen of the Presidium of the Supreme Soviet of Nakhchivan ASSR (1952–1964).

== See also ==
- Trunis
- St. Hovhannes Church (Dyrnys)
