= St. Gr. Lusavorich Monastery (Shurud) =

Armenian monastery in Nakhchivan, Azerbaijan

- Սուրբ Գրիգոր Լուսավորիչ վանք
- St. Gr. Lusavorich Monastery
- Location: Şurud
- Country: Azerbaijan
- Denomination: Armenian Apostolic Church

History
- Status: Destroyed

Architecture
- Style: Basilica
- Demolished: 1997–2006

St. Gr. Lusavorich Monastery was an Armenian monastery located in the village of Shurud (Julfa District) of the Nakhchivan Autonomous Republic of Azerbaijan. The monastery was located 1.5–2 km northeast of the village.

== History ==
The founding date of the monastery is unknown. According to an Armenian inscription on the bell tower, the people of Shurud renovated the church in 1708; renovated again at the end of the 18th century and the middle of the 19th.

== Architecture ==
At the late Soviet period, the monastery's auxiliary buildings, its school, and outer walls were in ruins. It was a basilica structure with a gabled roof, hall, five-sided apse, and two vestries, with a porch at the western facade. The bell tower bore an Armenian inscription. Ornamentation included decorative sculptural elements near the entrance and wall paintings of 17th or 18th century date.

== Destruction ==
The monastery was razed to ground at some point between 1997 and June 15, 2006, as documented by investigation of the Caucasus Heritage Watch.
