= Aveyard =

Aveyard is an English surname, found most commonly in Yorkshire. It is derived from an alias Hayvyerd adopted by a 16th-century resident of Dewsbury named Robert Janyn. It was first recorded in 1540, and has remained most common in the area around Dewsbury and Wakefield. Another mention in the 17th century was that a John Aveyard apprehended John Fawcet, who was one of those involved in the Farnley Wood Plot to overturn the return to monarchy in England.

In the 1881 Census, there were 343 people with the surname "Aveyard" and 85% of them were in Yorkshire.

Notable people with this name include:

- Victoria Aveyard (born 1990), American writer
- Walter Aveyard (1918–1985), English footballer

== See also ==
- Avey
- Aveyron (disambiguation)
