= St. Sargis Church (Channab) =

Armenian church in Çənnəb, Ordubad, Nakhchivan, Azerbaijan

- Ցղնայի Սուրբ Սարգիս եկեղեցի
- St. Sargis Church
- Location: Çənnəb
- Country: Azerbaijan
- Denomination: Armenian Apostolic Church

History
- Founded: 13–14th centuries

Architecture
- Demolished: February 2000 – August 2009

St. Sargis Church was an Armenian church located in Çənnəb village (Ordubad district) of the Nakhchivan Autonomous Republic of Azerbaijan. It was located in the southeastern part of the village, near Karmunji Hraparak (Bridge Square).

== History ==
The church was founded in 13–14th centuries, it was renovated in the 17th century and was repaired by S. Saghatelian in 1890.

== Architectural characteristics ==
The church was a single-nave structure with a semicircular apse and entrances in the north and west. The church had Armenian inscriptions inside, on the northern, southern, and western walls.

== Destruction ==
The church was still standing and intact as of February 3, 2000 and was destroyed between February 2000 and August 13, 2009, as documented by the investigation of the Caucasus Heritage Watch.

== See also ==
- St. Astvatsatsin Monastery (Channab)
- St. Stepanos Monastery (Channab)
