= Monastery of Saint Translators =

Armenian monastery in Azerbaijan

- Սուրբ Թարգմանչաց վանք Quşçu məbədi
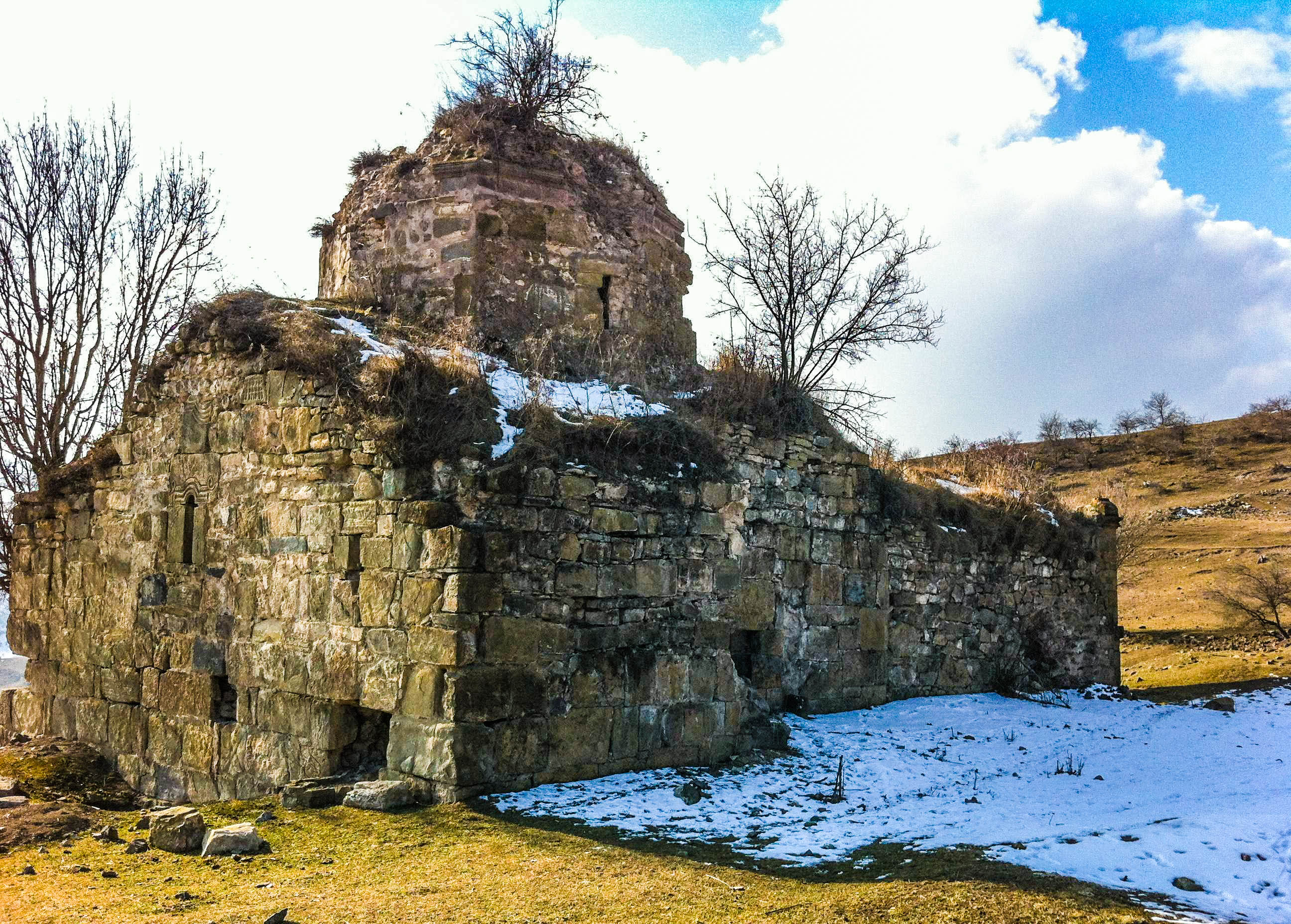

- Location within Azerbaijan

Religion
- Affiliation: Armenian Apostolic Church
- Rite: Armenian Apostolic

Location
- Location: 4 km north of Dashkasan, Azerbaijan
- Coordinates: 40.494444°N 46.063333°E

Architecture
- Completed: 4th-5th century

The Monastery of Saint Translators (Armenian: Սուրբ Թարգմանչաց վանք, Surb Targmanchats Vank, Azerbaijani: Quşçu məbədi) is an Armenian monastery, founded in the 4th century. It is located north of Dashkasan, in Azerbaijan.

The Monastery was founded by Saints Mesrop Mashtots and Sahak Partev. In 411 they translated the Bible from Syriac.

== History ==
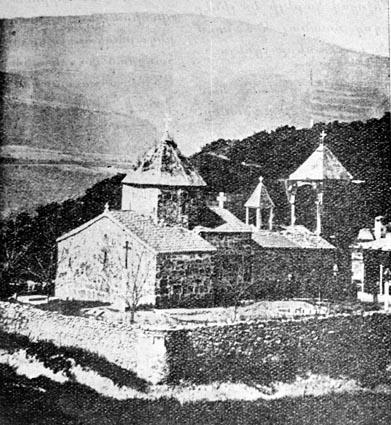
The monastery in 1911.

According to some sources the monastery was built in the end of the 4th century and the beginning of the 5th century. In 989 and 1845 the monastery was reconstructed. The monastery rose during the reign of bishop Gabriel Harutunyan. During his reign, many people from near villages help monastery. The new rose of the monastery was during the reign of Stepanos Balyants in the 1830s. It is known that in 1839, monk Grigor Ter-Hovhannesyants three times served as a priest. In 1849 archimandrite Sargis had followed archimandrite Hovhannes.

A vaulted barn is located to the east of the monastery.

=== Name ===
The Monastery of Saint Translators (Surb Targmanchats) received its name because on its wall Mesrop Mashtots and Sahak Partev translated the Bible from Syriac.

== Description ==
=== Church ===
The main church of the complex is dated to 1630. The church consists of one vaulted rom with an apse in the east, between the two small rooms. Around the nave of the church is located gavit (for porch in Armenian), which stretches west from nave as well. Two-storeyed tower, built of carved stone, is adjacent to the porch to the south and leads to the main entrance of the church. The hall is located north of the church, which probably served as a place of worship - sacristy.

=== The cells ===
There are cells of the monks 5 meters (16 feet) east of the church, looking west. The cells have 6 vaulted rooms, with each having an entrance and a window looking west. To the southeast of cells from north to south stretches a dining room. From the south to the dining room adjoins a similar room, most likely served as a kitchen. The cells of the monks were built in the same style as the whole church, built in 1630. The barn and dining room were attached with archimandrite Stepanos in the 1830s.

== Current status ==
The monastery complex is in a state of collapse.

Currently, the monastery is located in extreme decline, with its cells, a covered stockyard, warehouse are lying in ruins. Nearby buildings are just a pile of stones.

== See also ==
- List of Armenian churches in Azerbaijan
