= Aveyron (disambiguation) =

Aveyron is a department in southern France.

Aveyron may also refer to:

- Aveyron (river), in southern France, tributary of the Tarn
- Aveyron (Loing), a river in central France, tributary of the Loing

== See also ==
- Avey
- Aveyard
