= St. Mary Church, Shiraz =

Armenian Church in Shiraz, Iran

Saint Mary Church
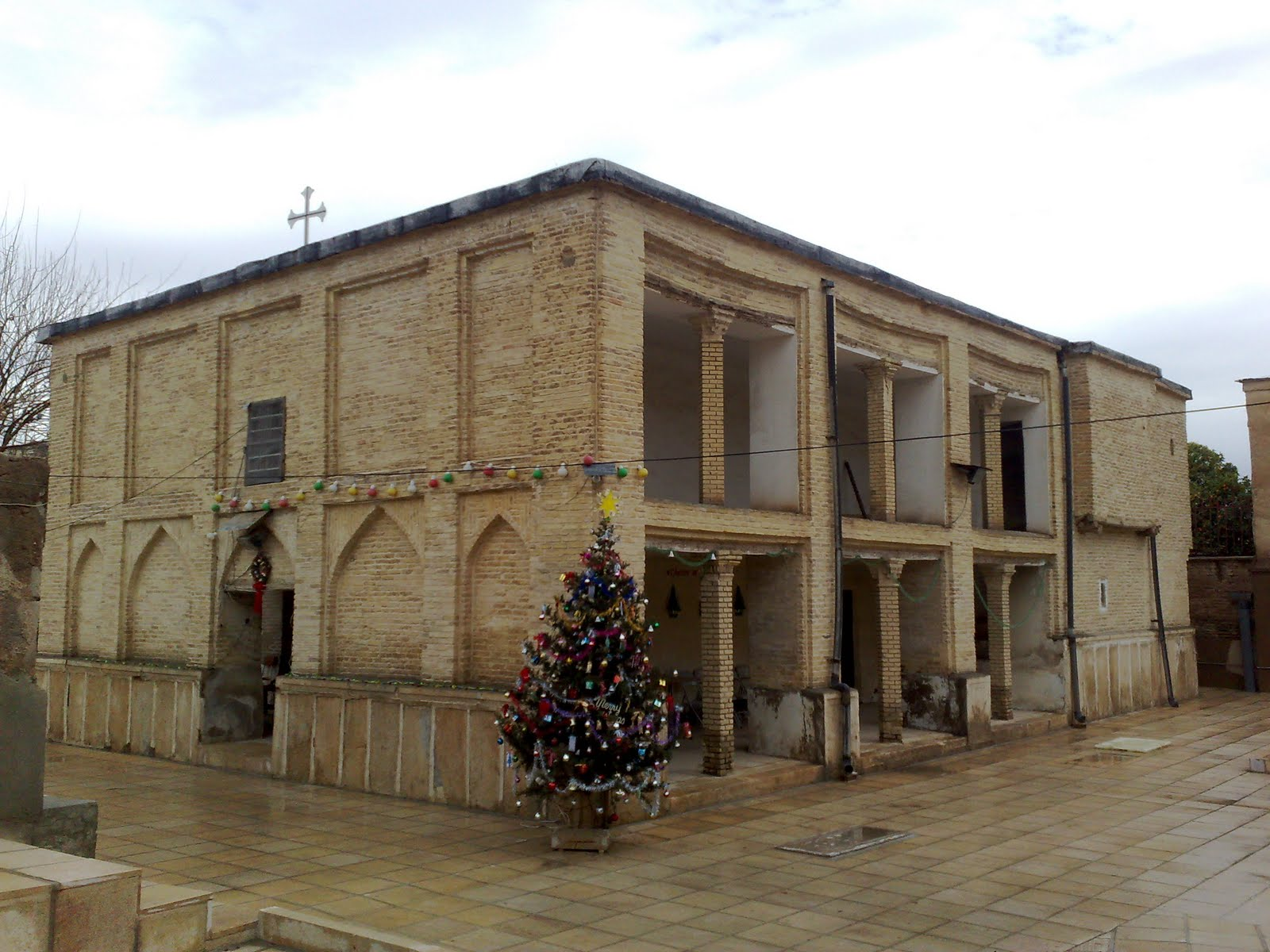
- Saint Mary church of Shiraz

- Location within Iran

Religion
- Affiliation: Armenian Apostolic Church
- Rite: Armenian
- Status: Functioning

Location
- Location: Shiraz, Iran
- Coordinates: 29.611254°N 52.537557°E

Architecture
- Style: Armenian
- Completed: 1662

Saint Mary Church, Holy Mother of God Church or Surp Mariam Asdvadzadzin Church (Armenian: Շիրազի Սուրբ Մարիամ Աստվածածին եկեղեցի, Shirazi Surb Mariam Astvatsatsin yekeghets’i, Persian: کلیسای مریم مقدس) is an Armenian Apostolic church in Shiraz, Fars Province, Iran completed in 1662. It is the only Armenian church in Shiraz.

The grave of well-known Armenian writer, Mesrop Taghiadian is in this church.

== See also ==
- Iranian Armenians
- List of Armenian churches in Iran
- Church of St. Simon the Zealot
