= Holy Saviour Monastery of Julfa =

Armenian Apostolic monastery in Jugha, Nakhichevan Autonomous Republic

- Սուրբ Ամենափրկիչ վանք (Ջուղա)
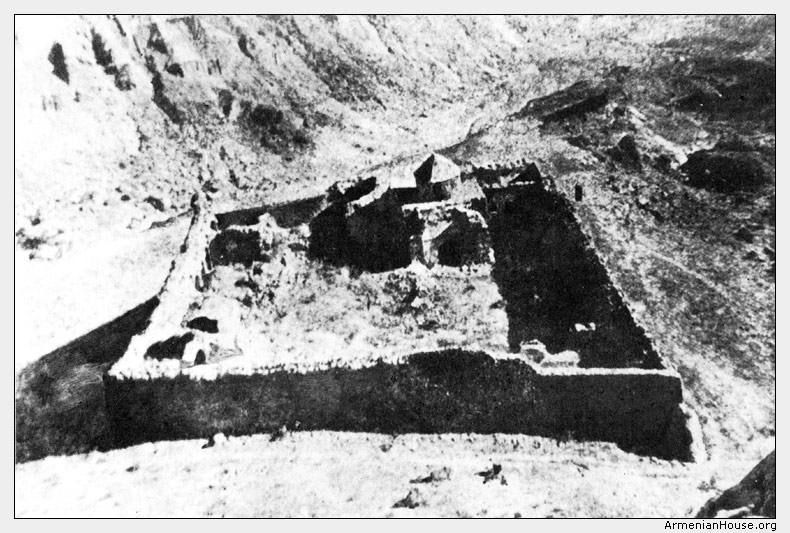
- Holy Saviour Monastery of Julfa

Religion
- Affiliation: Armenian Apostolic Church
- Rite: Armenian Apostolic
- Ecclesiastical or organisational status: yes
- Status: Destroyed

Location
- Location: Jugha, Nakhichevan Autonomous Republic
- Interactive map of Holy Saviour Monastery of Julfa
- Coordinates: 38°58′27″N 45°33′53″E

Architecture
- Style: Armenian
- Completed: 9th-10th century
- Destroyed: 1997–2003

Holy Saviour Monastery of Julfa (Armenian: Ջուղայի Սուրբ Ամենափրկիչ վանք, St. Astvatsatsin Monastery) was an Armenian Apostolic monastery, located north-west of Jugha cemetery at the end of the gorge, 3 km away from the cemetery, on that slope of a high mountain. In the southern part of the monastery, at the foot of the Magharda mountain range, the Araks River flows.

== History ==
According to Mesrop Smbatyants (hy), the monastery was founded in 1271 by Baron Vahram. However, there is written information about the monastic complex prior to 1271. Holy Saviour monastery dates to the time of Khachik II. In 976 king Ashot the Merciful donated money to the monastery, according to St. Stephen Monastery documents. It is believed that the original building of the monastery complex was founded no later than the 9th to 10th centuries. According to Ayvazyan, it was founded in the 12-13th centuries.

== Current status ==
The monastery was still standing in the 1980s. In September 2003, the monastery was undergoing destruction. and by September 2003 it was already completely erased, as documented by Caucasus Heritage Watch. The monastery had also a cemetery with 47 tombstones and it was located just south of the monastery. The cemetery was also completely destroyed by September 2003.

== See also ==
- List of Armenian churches in Azerbaijan
- Holy Saviour Monastery of New Julfa
