= St. Astvatsatsin Monastery (Shurud) =

Armenian monastery in Nakhchivan, Azerbaijan

- Kusakan Monastery
- Սուրբ Աստվածածին անապատ
- Location: Şurud
- Country: Azerbaijan
- Denomination: Armenian Apostolic Church

History
- Status: Destroyed

Architecture
- Demolished: 1997–2006

St. Astvatsatsin Monastery or Kusakan Monastery was an Armenian monastery located in the village of Shurud (Julfa District) of the Nakhchivan Autonomous Republic of Azerbaijan. The monastery was located approximately 1 km north of the village.

== History ==
The founding date of the monastery is unknown. It was rebuilt in 1631.

== Architecture ==
The monastery was a single-chamber nave structure. There were wall paintings adorning the building as well as there were 17th-century carved cross-stones (khachkars) decorating the front of the bema. There were Armenian inscriptions on the interior.

== Destruction ==
The monastery was damaged but still standing in the late Soviet period, however it was razed to ground at some point between 1997 and June 15, 2006, as documented by investigation of the Caucasus Heritage Watch.
