= St. Hakob-Hayrapet Church (Shurud) =

Armenian church in Nakhchivan, Azerbaijan

- Սբ․ Հակոբ Հայրապետ եկեղեցի
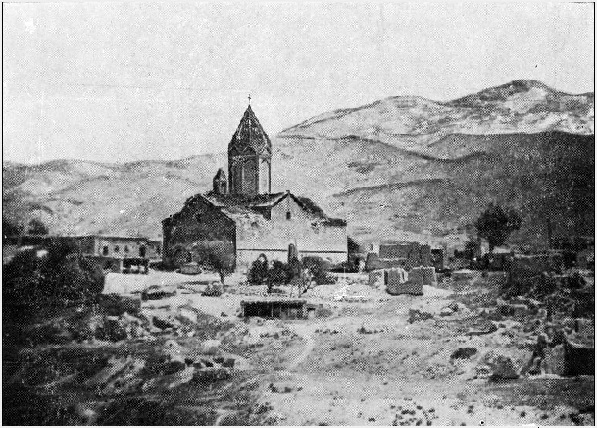
- St. Hakob-Hayrapet Church
- Location: Şurud
- Country: Azerbaijan
- Denomination: Armenian Apostolic Church

History
- Status: Destroyed
- Founded: 12th century

Architecture
- Style: Domed basilica
- Demolished: 1997–2006

St. Hakob-Hayrapet Church was an Armenian church located in the village of Shurud (Julfa District) of the Nakhchivan Autonomous Republic of Azerbaijan. The church was located in the central part of the village.

== History ==
The church was founded in the 12th century and was renovated in the mid-17th century.

== Architecture ==
One of the most striking architectural features of the church was its cruciform basilican plan and high-domed cupola. The interior consisted of a nave with two aisles, large apse, and two vestries. Bands of relief sculpture decorated the door. A pillared porch at the western facade was destroyed by an earthquake in 1841. Armenian inscriptions were placed in the interior, on the western facade, and on the exterior of the dome, while wall paintings added in the 1680s by the Armenian poet and painter, Naghash Hovnatan, adorned the dome.

== Destruction ==
The church was destroyed at some point between 1997 and June 15, 2006, as documented by investigation of the Caucasus Heritage Watch.
