= Unus, Azerbaijan =

Village and municipality in Ordubad, Nakhchivan, Azerbaijan

Unus
- Municipality
- Location within Azerbaijan
- Coordinates: 39°00′47″N 45°58′58″E
- Country: Azerbaijan
- Autonomous republic: Nakhchivan
- District: Ordubad

Population (2005)
  - Total: 743
- Time zone: UTC+4 (AZT)

Unus is a village and municipality in the Ordubad District of Nakhchivan, Azerbaijan. It is located 33 km in the north-west from the district center, on the slope of the Zangezur ridge. Its population is busy with gardening, farming and animal husbandry. There are secondary school, library, club and a medical center in the village. It has a population of 743.

== Etymology ==
According to researchers, unus is a distorted form of the word of əniz//eniz (groove in the ground, arable land, arable, pasture, empty field) in the Turkic languages.

== See also ==
- St. Khach Monastery (Unus)
