= St. Stepanos Monastery (Channab) =

Armenian monastery in Nakhchivan, Azerbaijan

- Սուրբ Ստեփանոս վանք
- St. Stepanos Monastery
- Location: Çənnəb
- Country: Azerbaijan
- Denomination: Armenian Apostolic Church

History
- Founded: 12–13th centuries

Architecture
- Demolished: February 3, 2000 – November 24, 2010

St. Stepanos Monastery was an Armenian monastery located south of Çənnəb village (Ordubad district) of the Nakhchivan Autonomous Republic of Azerbaijan. The monastery was located on high ground in the former village of Mtsgun, some 3 km south of Çənnəb.

== History ==
The monastery was founded in 12–13th centuries. It was rebuilt in 1895, according to an Armenian inscription on the lintel above the northern porch of the church.

== Architectural characteristics ==
The church of the monastery complex had a wooden roof. The church consisted of an apse, two vestries, and a hall. There were a number of 9th to 17th century cross-stones (khachkars) embedded in the walls of the church.

== Destruction ==
The monastery was still standing and intact on February 3, 2000. However, it was destroyed between February 3, 2000 and November 24, 2010 as documented by the investigation of the Caucasus Heritage Watch.

== See also ==
- St. Astvatsatsin Monastery (Channab)
- St. Sargis Church (Channab)
