= Berdak =

Armenian village

Coordinates: 38.9705°N 45.9539°E

Berdak (Armenian: Բերդակ) was a village in the Goghtn district of Armenia, currently included into Ordubad region of Nakhichevan autonomy of Azerbaijan.

The village was located on a hill surrounded by gardens. The ruins of St. Hovhannes church remain on the top of the hill. According to a small plaque, the church was last renovated in 1888.
