= St. Hakob-Hayrapet Monastery (Paragha) =

Armenian monastery in Nakhchivan, Azerbaijan

- Սուրբ Հակոբ Հայրապետ վանք
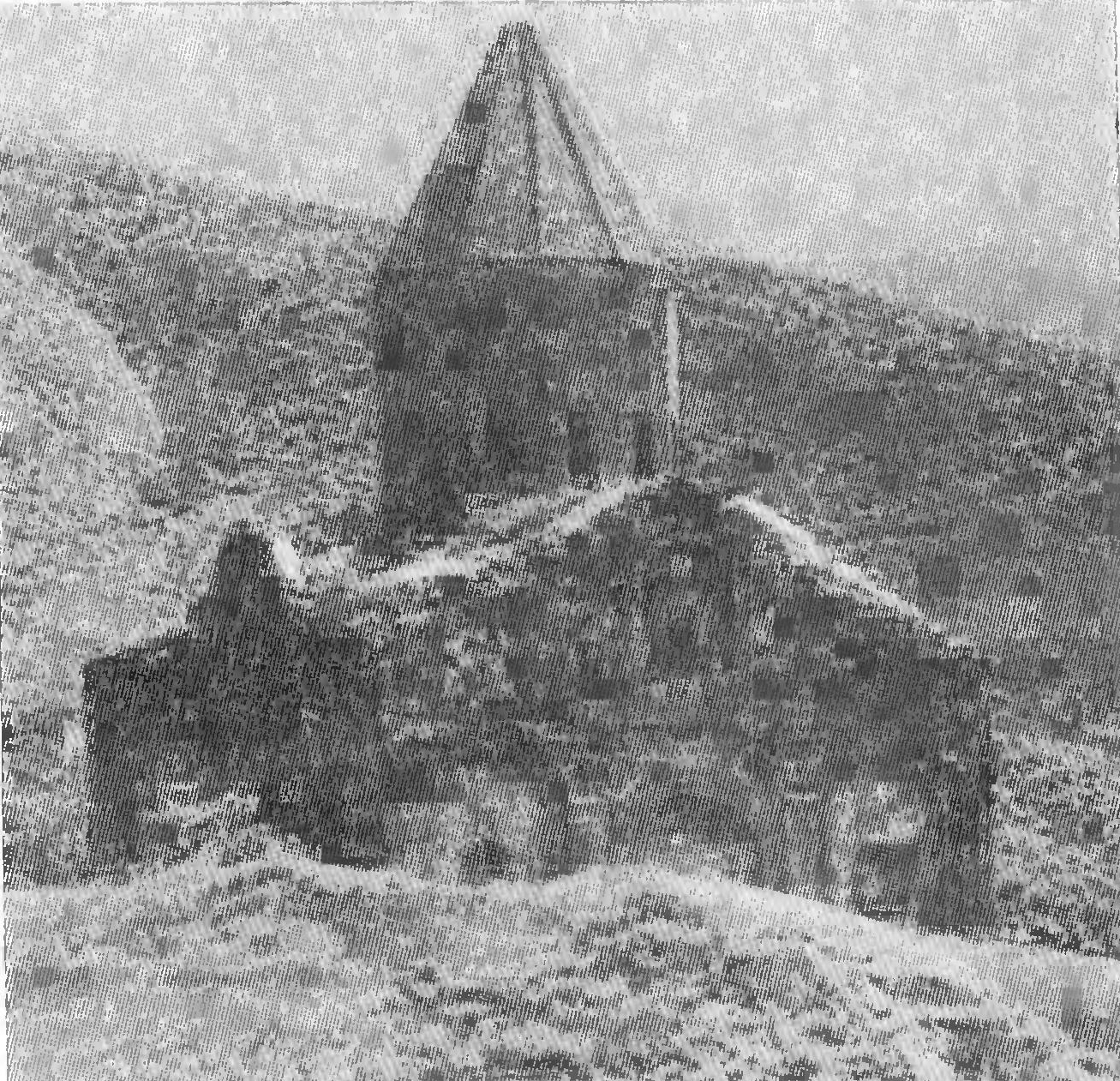
- St. Hakob-Hayrapet Monastery
- Location: Parağa
- Country: Azerbaijan
- Denomination: Armenian Apostolic Church

History
- Status: Destroyed
- Founded: 12–13th centuries

Architecture
- Style: Domed basilica
- Demolished: 1997–2000

St. Hakob-Hayrapet Monastery was an Armenian monastery located near Parağa village (Ordubad district) of the Nakhchivan Autonomous Republic of Azerbaijan. The monastery was located adjacent to the slope of a hill 1 km northwest of the village.

== History ==
The monastery was founded in the 12–13th centuries and was renovated between 1691 and 1701, according to an Armenian inscription on the tympanum of the doorway.

== Architecture ==
In the late Soviet period, the church of the monastery was still standing, but the porch adjacent to its western facade as well as the refectory, associated monastic buildings, and outer walls were in ruins. The monastery was nestled in a small glen at the edge of a mountain. It was a domed basilica with a main apse, two-storied vestries on either side, and a cupola with 12 windows set atop four cruciform pillars. There were reliefs and khachkars on the walls, while the western doorway bore ornamental bands. There were Armenian inscriptions on the western, southern, and northern facades.

== Destruction ==
The monastery was razed to ground at some point between 1997 and February 3, 2000, as documented by investigation of the Caucasus Heritage Watch.
