= St. Astvatsatsin Monastery (Bist) =

Armenian monastery in Ordubad, Nakhchivan, Azerbaijan

- Սուրբ Աստվածածին վանք
- St. Astvatsatsin Monastery
- Location: Bist, Ordubad
- Country: Azerbaijan
- Denomination: Armenian Apostolic Church

History
- Status: Destroyed
- Founded: 12–13th centuries

Architecture
- Style: Basilica
- Demolished: 1997–2006

St. Astvatsatsin Monastery was an Armenian monastery located in Bist village (Ordubad district) of the Nakhchivan Autonomous Republic of Azerbaijan. The monastery was located in the central district of the village.

== History ==
The monastery was founded in the 12th or 13th century and was renovated in 1687 and 1877.

== Architecture ==
The monastery complex initially had outer walls, school, living quarters and other auxiliary buildings, however, in the later Soviet period only the church of the monastery complex was extant. The monastery was one of the most well-known medieval architectural monuments of Nakhichevan, where scribes wrote several manuscripts. The church of the monastery was a basilica with a nave, two aisles, four pillars, a seven-sided apse, two vestries, and a vaulted porch on the western facade.

== Destruction ==
The church of the monastery was still standing in the later Soviet period and was razed to its foundations at some point between 1997 and June 15, 2006, as documented by the Caucasus Heritage Watch. By 2016, a new building was constructed on the site of the monastery.
