= Hovnatanian =

Armenian family of painters

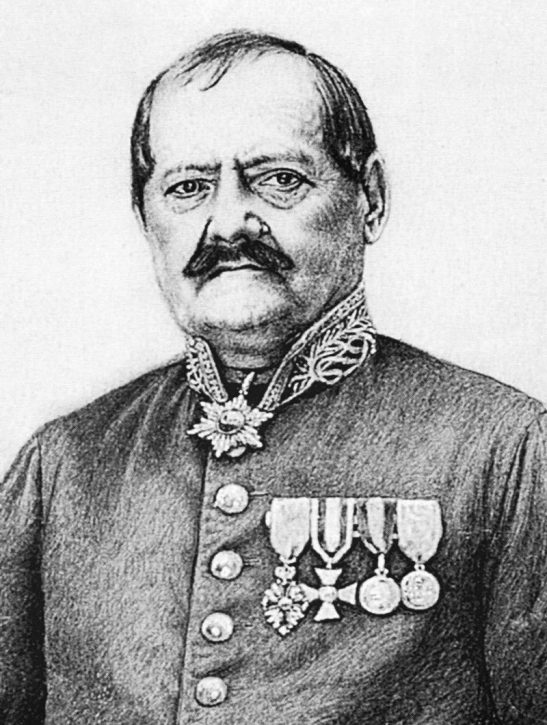
Hakob Hovnatanyan (1806–1881), a representative of the last generation of Hovnatanyans.

The Hovnatanyan family (Armenian: Հովնաթանյաններ, Hovnat'anyanner) was a prominent Armenian family of painters. They include five generations from 17th to 19th centuries. Hovnatanyans are originally from the village of Shorot, Yernjak district in Nakhichevan (now Şurud, Julfa Rayon, Nakhichivan Autonomous Republic).

They were based in Nakhichevan, Yerevan, Tbilisi, Ejmiatsin, Saint Petersburg and Persia. Most of their works are dedicated to Christianity like other works of their era.

The surname derives from Hovnatan, the Armenian equivalent of Jonathan.

== Family members ==
- Naghash Hovnatan (Նաղաշ Հովնաթան) (1661–1722) – founder of the family; poet, artist, miniaturist, wall-painter, and a church clerk
  - Harutyun Hovnatanyan (Հարություն Հովնաթանյան) (18th century) – artist and a wall-painter
  - Hakob Hovnatanyan I (Հակոբ Հովնաթանյան) (died in 1757) – artist, miniaturist, and poet
    - Hovnatan Hovnatanyan (Հովնաթան Հովնաթանյան) (1730s – 1801/1802) – wall-painter
    - Mkrtum Hovnatanyan (Մկրտում Հովնաթանյան) (1779–1846) – artist, buried in Khojivank cemetery, Tbilisi.
      - Aghaton Hovnatanyan (Աղաթոն Հովնաթանյան) (1816–1893) – artist
      - Hakob Hovnatanyan II (Հակոբ Հովնաթանյան) (1806–1881) – artist
        - Ruben Hovnatanyan (1940–1999) – artist

== Legacy ==
A crater on the planet Mercury is named after Hakob Hovnatanian.

== Gallery ==
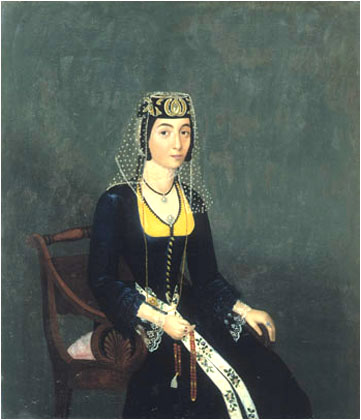
Portrait of Melikov by Hakob Hovnatanyan, The Georgian Museum of Fine Arts, Tbilisi.

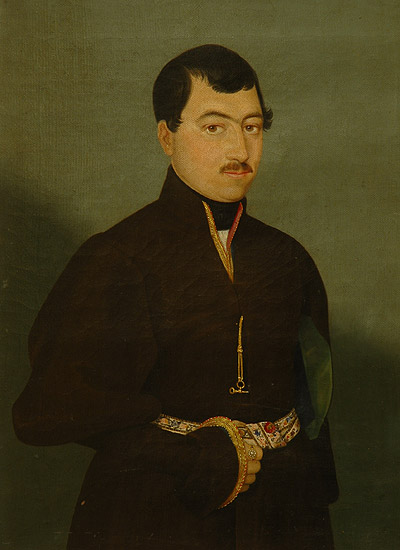
Karajyan by Hakob Hovnatanyan.

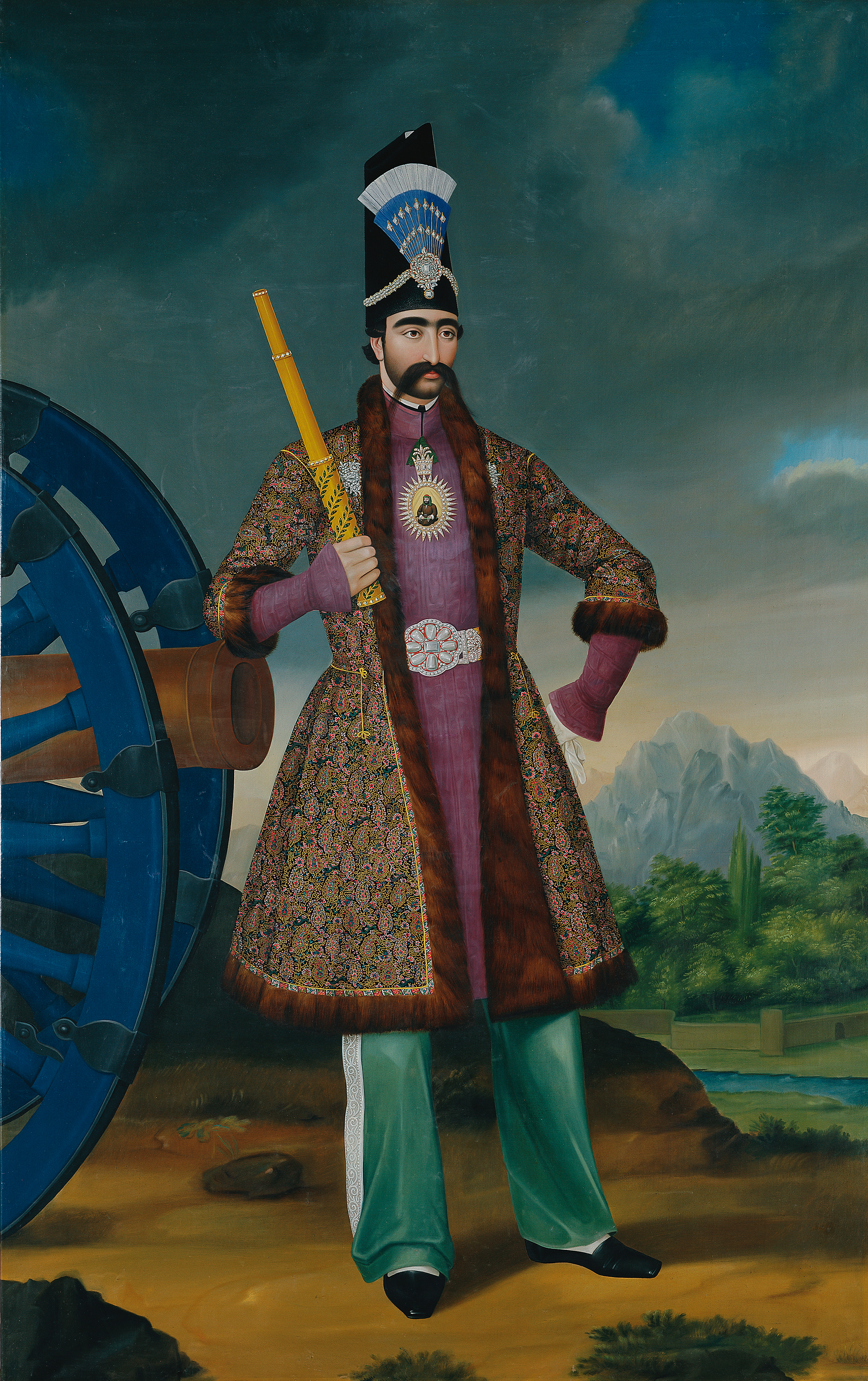
The Shah of Persia Nāser ad-Dīn Shāh by Hakob Hovnatanian

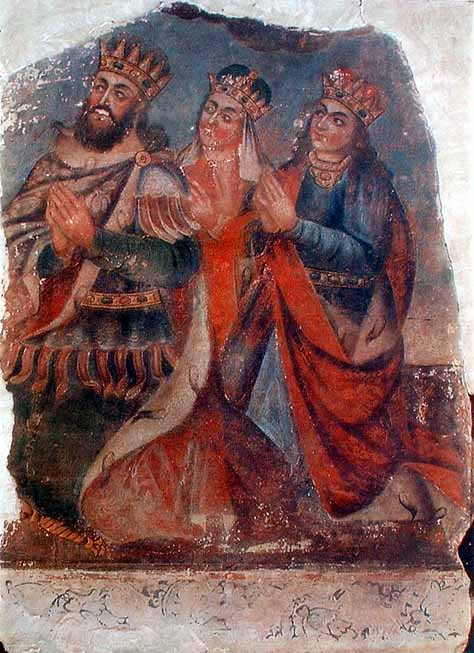
King Tiridates with his wife Ashkhen and sister Khosrovidukht by Naghash Hovnatan.

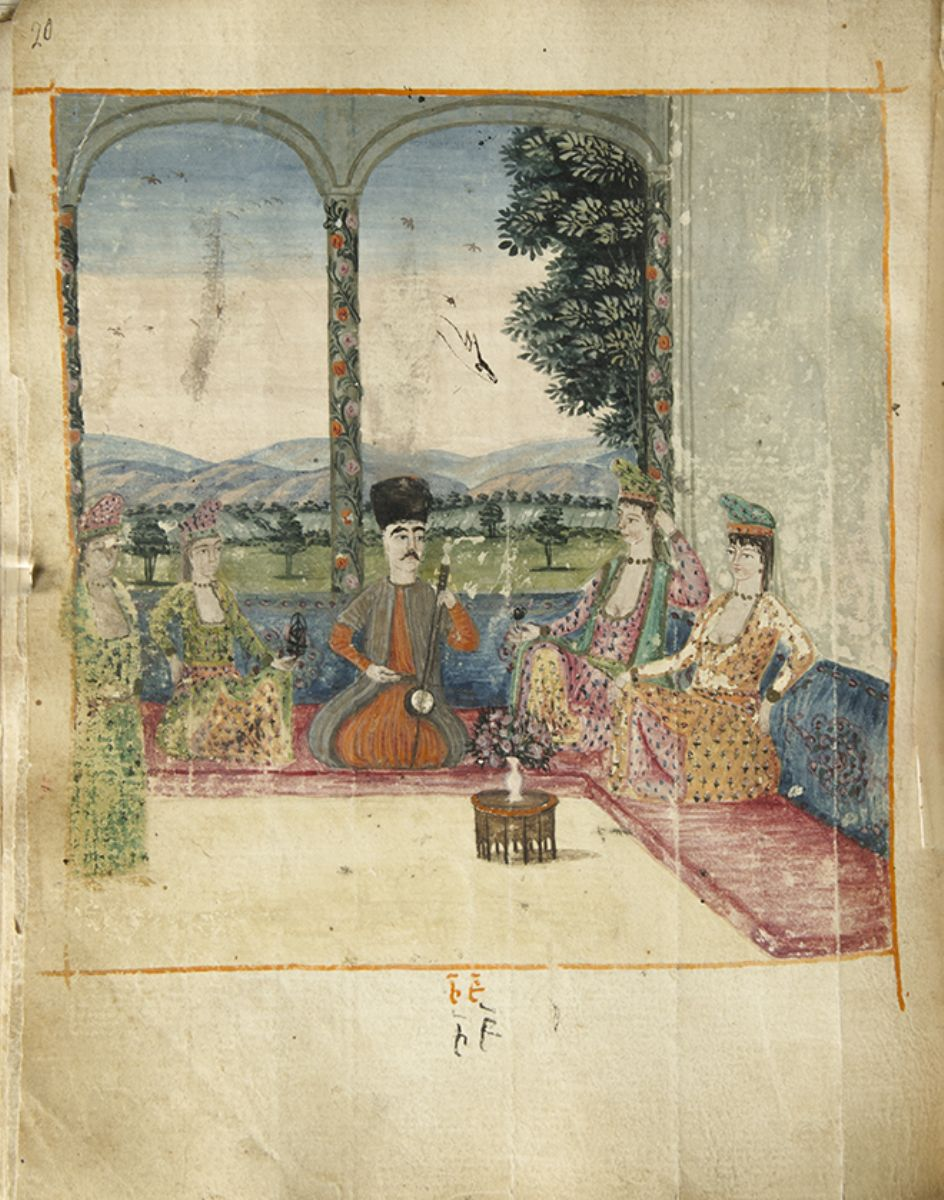
18th century drawing of Naghash Hovnatan

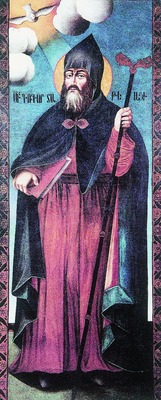
Grigor Tatevatsi by Hovnatan Hovnatanyan

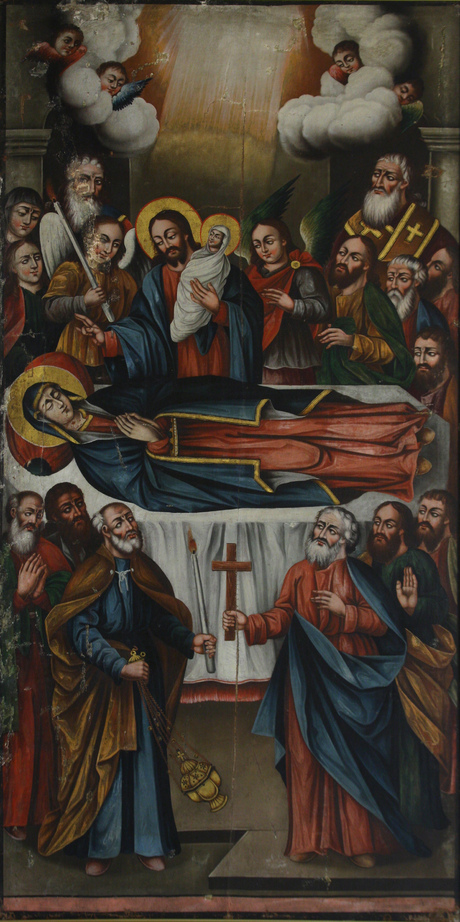
Dormition of the Virgin by Hovnatan Hovnatanyan

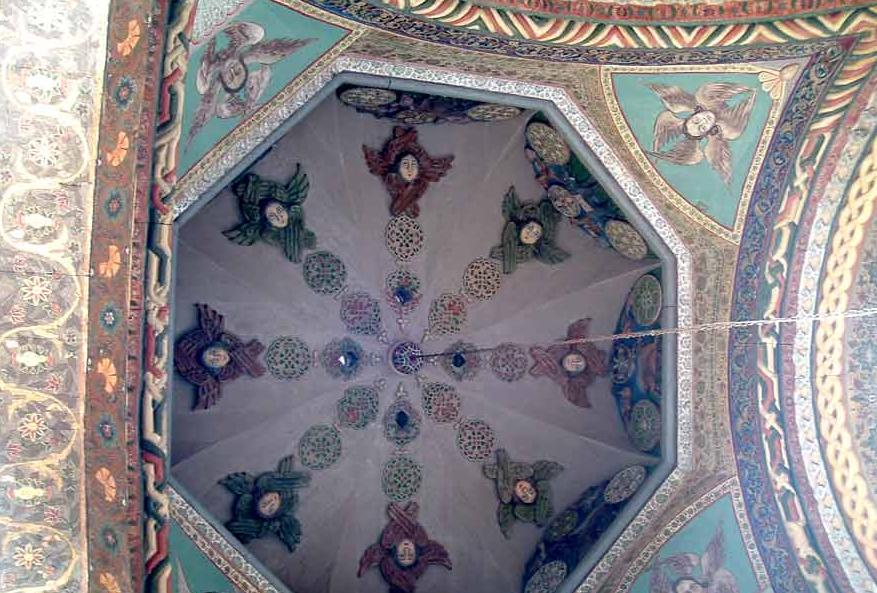
Etchmiadzin Cathedral dome by Hovnatan Hovnatanyan and his son Mkrtum Hovnatanyan.

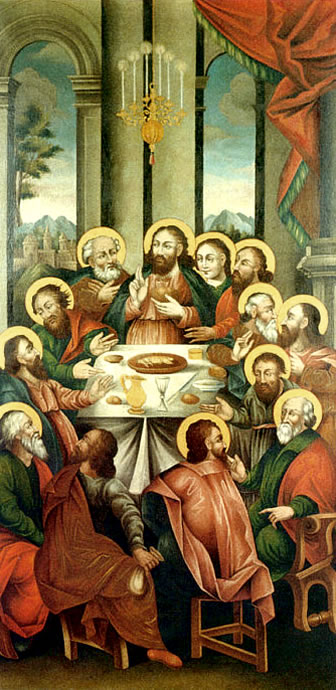
Last Supper by Hovnatan Hovnatanyan.

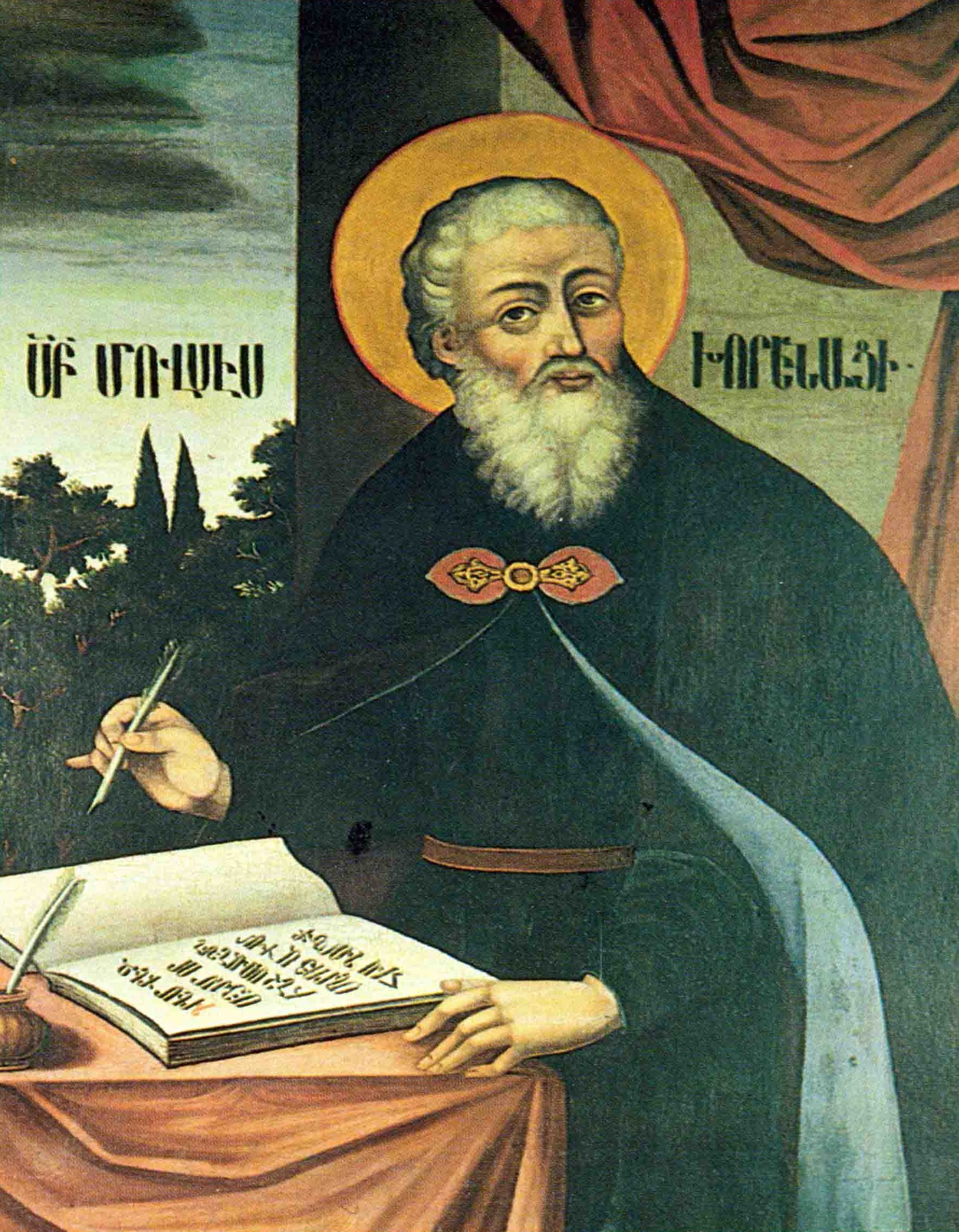
Moses of Chorene by Hovnatan Hovnatanyan.

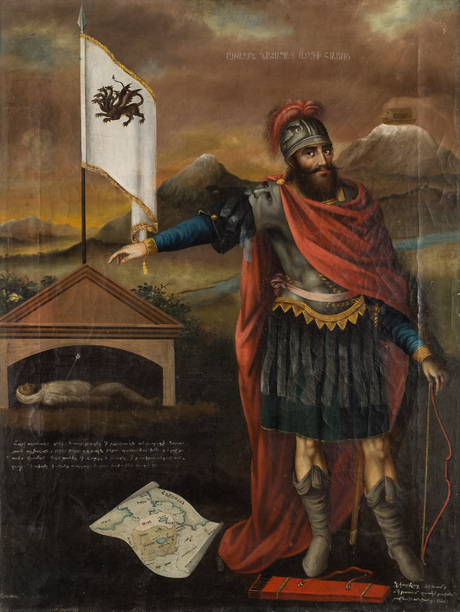
Hayk by Mkrtum Hovnatanyan.

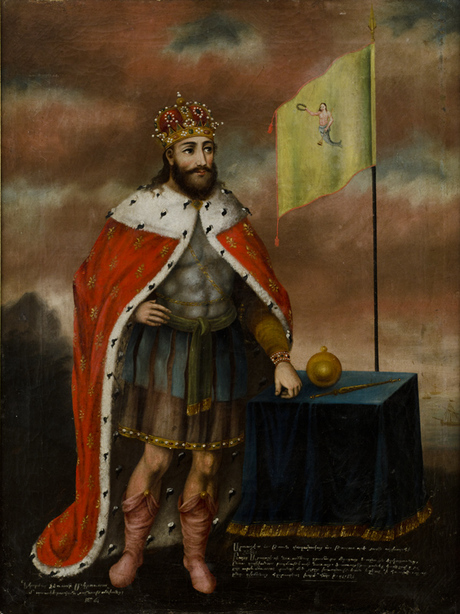
Artashes I by Mkrtum Hovnatanyan

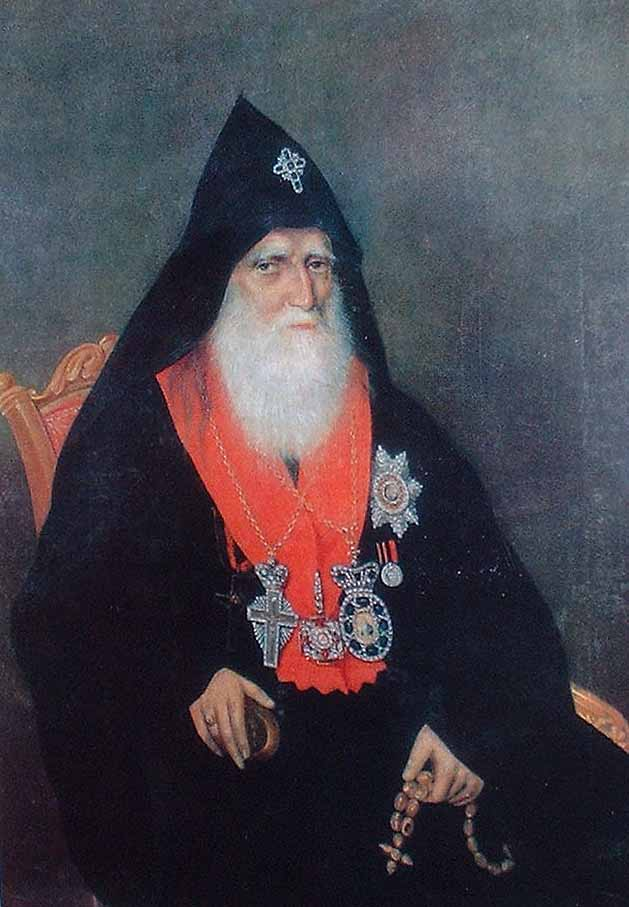
Nerses V by Hakob Hovnatanyan.

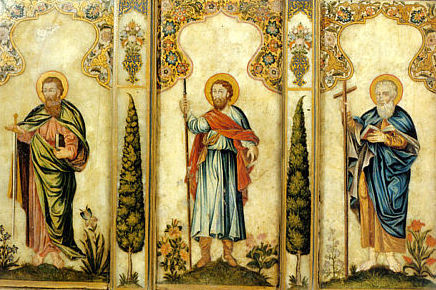
Ejmiatsin, by Naghash Hovnatanyan.

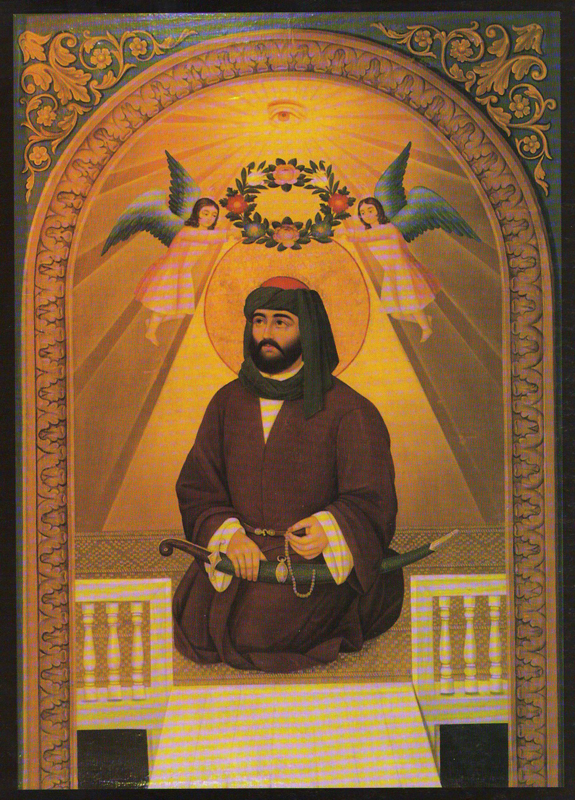
Ali by Hakob Hovnatanyan.

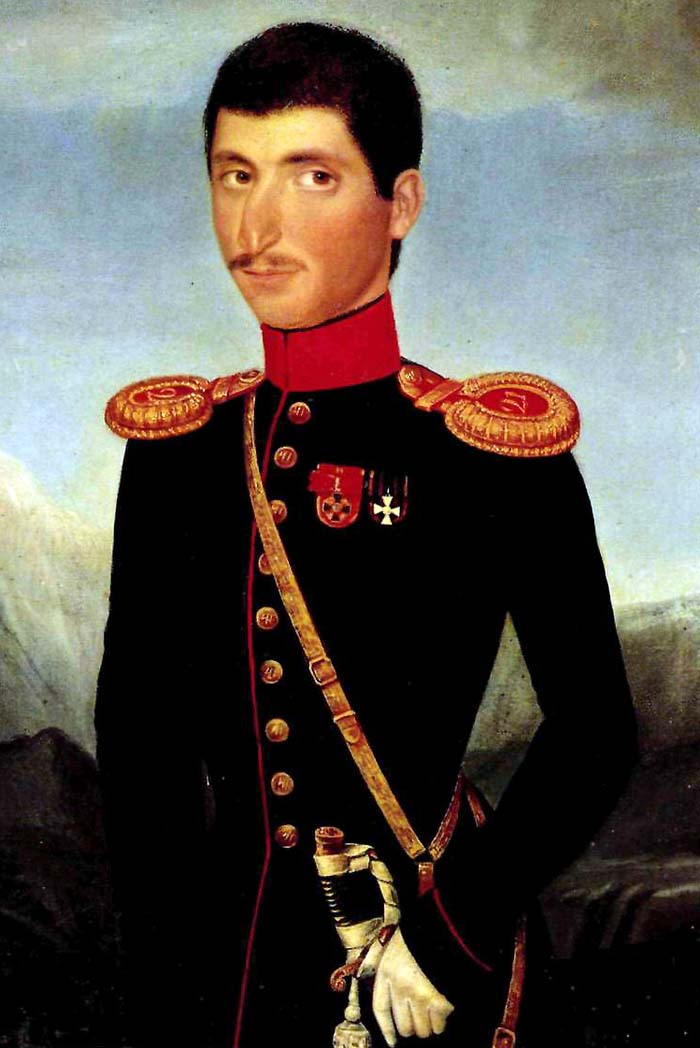
Captain Buchkiev by Aghaton Hovnatanyan

== See also ==
- Armenian culture
