= Bist, Ordubad =

Village and municipality in Ordubad District, Nakhchivan, Azerbaijan

Bist
- Municipality
- Location within Azerbaijan
- Coordinates: 39°08′58″N 45°52′50″E
- Country: Azerbaijan
- Autonomous republic: Nakhchivan
- District: Ordubad

Population (2005)
  - Total: 483
- Time zone: UTC+4 (AZT)

Bist is a village and municipality in the Ordubad District of Nakhchivan, Azerbaijan. It is located in the near of the Ordubad-Nurgut highway, in the north-west from the district center. Its population is busy with gardening, beekeeping and animal husbandry. There are secondary school, club, library and a medical center in the village. It has a population of 483.

== History ==
Historically part of the Goghtn Region of Armenia, the settlement had several Armenian churches. In the village was the Surp Astvatsatsin church – a basilica plan church with a porch, In the countryside nearby was the Surp Nishan monastery

== Bist bridge I ==
The historical monument of the 17th century is located on the Alahi river flowing by the west side of the Bist village. There is also information about the construction of the bridge in the period of Shah Abbas I. Width of the two-arched bridge, built with stone and brick is 3.8 m, length is 21 m and height is 10 m. Sides of the bridge which served to the trade caravans, moving with branches of the Great Silk Road, were covered with iron. Previously, sides of the bridge was reinforced with the local reddish stones.

== Bist Bridge II ==
The bridge of the 17th–18th centuries is located on the Nasirvaz river, in the south east of the Bist village. Width of bridge is 4 m, length is 21 m and height is 10 m. The main purpose of the monument, built stone and brick, with single arch and covered with iron sides is designed to facilitate the movement of trade caravans and passers. In the south side of the bridge, on the stone was written date "in 1868". Although the techniques of construction is similar with the first bridge, it was built in the next period. It is assumed that the bridge was repaired in 1868.

== St. Nshan Monastery ==
St. Nshan or Kopatap Monastery was located 1 km north of the village. The monastery was founded in the late 5th century and was destroyed at some point between 1997 and 2006.

== St. Astvatsatsin Monastery ==
St. Astvatsatsin Monastery was located in the central part of the village. The monastery, founded in 12th or 13th centuries, was razed to its foundations at some point between 1997 and June 15, 2006.

== New Cemetery of Bist ==
The New Cemetery of Bist was an Armenian cemetery located southwest of the village. It consisted of 250–260 tombstones and was destroyed by June 15, 2006.

== Notable people ==
- Sergo Hambardzumyan, an Armenian heavyweight weightlifter.

== See also ==
- St. Nshan Monastery (Bist)
- St. Astvatsatsin Monastery (Bist)
