= St. Nshan Monastery (Bist) =

Armenian monastery near Bist, Ordubad, Nakhchivan, Azerbaijan

- Kopatap Monastery
- Սուրբ Նշան վանք (Կոպատափ անապատ)
- Location: Bist, Ordubad
- Country: Azerbaijan
- Denomination: Armenian Apostolic Church

History
- Status: Destroyed
- Founded: 5th century

Architecture
- Style: Basilica
- Demolished: 1997–2006

St. Nshan or Kopatap Monastery was an Armenian monastery located near Bist village (Ordubad district) of the Nakhchivan Autonomous Republic of Azerbaijan. The monastery was located 1 km north of the village.

== History ==
The monastery was founded in the late 5th century; it was rebuilt in 1668 and was renovated in the 1890s.

== Architecture ==
The monastery was a basilica-style structure. it was a prominent medieval cultural center. Mesrop Mashtots, inventor of the Armenian alphabet, visited the monastery and several manuscripts were copied and illuminated in its scriptorium, some of which are now preserved in the Matenadaran, a manuscript museum and research institute in Yerevan, Armenia. The monastery consisted of one nave, two aisles, a five-sided apse, with an arcaded porch to the south. Armenian inscriptions were set in the southern facade and in the interior.

== Destruction ==
The monastery was still standing by the late Soviet period and was destroyed at some point between 1997 and June 15, 2006, as documented by the Caucasus Heritage Watch.

The monastery had also a small cemetery adjacent to the monastery's narthex. The cemetery was also destroyed by June 15, 2006.
