= St. Khach Monastery (Unus) =

Armenian monastery

- Տրունյաց Սբ․ Խաչ Վանք
- Interactive map of St. Khach Monastery

Monastery information
- Denomination: Armenian Apostolic Church
- Established: 12th century

Architecture
- Status: Destroyed

Site
- Location: Unus, Azerbaijan
- Country: Azerbaijan

St. Khach Monastery was an Armenian monastery located near Unus village (Ordubad district) of the Nakhchivan Autonomous Republic of Azerbaijan. It was located in a gorge in the upper part of Vanandchay (Trunis, Vardanadzor) valley, on the right bank of the Vanandchay river. The church of the monastery complex was still standing in the 1980s and it was destroyed by 2000.

== History ==
The monastery was founded in the 12th century. It was renovated in 1687 according to the Armenian inscription on a cross-stone (khachkar) above the church's doorway and the inscriptions on five cross-stones set in the upper part of the south facade. It was renovated again in 1859.

== Architectural characteristics ==
The church of the monastery was still a standing monument in the 1980s, however much of the complex, including a porch, outer wall and six to seven monastic buildings, was in ruins. The monastery had a vineyard arranged to the south. It had a rectangular, vaulted structure with a nave and two aisles, an eastern apse with two vestries on either side. Armenian inscriptions were placed in the northern, western and southern facades.

== Destruction ==
The monastery has been destroyed at some point between 1997 and 2000. In particular, it has been completely erased by February 15, 2000, as documented by satellite forensic investigation of the Caucasus Heritage Watch.
