= St. Stepanos Monastery (Shurud) =

Armenian monastery in Nakhchivan, Azerbaijan

- Սուրբ Ստեփանոս վանք
- Location: Şurud
- Country: Azerbaijan
- Denomination: Armenian Apostolic Church

History
- Status: Destroyed
- Founded: 9–10th centuries

Architecture
- Demolished: 1997–2006

St. Stepanos Monastery was an Armenian monastery located near the village of Shurud (Julfa District) of the Nakhchivan Autonomous Republic of Azerbaijan.

== History ==
The monastery was founded in the 9th or 10th centuries. It was renovated in the 17th century as well as in the 19th–20th centuries.

== Architecture ==
The monastery had a single-chamber nave, a rectangular apse, and an entryway in the west. There were Armenian inscriptions inside the monastery.

== Destruction ==
The monastery was destroyed at some point between 1997 and June 15, 2006, as documented by investigation of the Caucasus Heritage Watch.
