= Parağa =

Village and municipality in Nakhchivan, Azerbaijan

- Municipality
- Location within Azerbaijan
- Coordinates: 39°04′30″N 45°53′36″E
- Country: Azerbaijan
- Autonomous republic: Nakhchivan
- District: Ordubad

Population (2005)
  - Total: 306
- Time zone: UTC+4 (AZT)

Parağa is a village and municipality in the Ordubad District of Nakhchivan, Azerbaijan. It is located in the near of the Ordubad-Tivi highway, 48 kilometres (30 miles) in the north-west from the district centre, on the left bank of the Gilanchay river, on the slope of the Zangezur ridge. Its population is engaged in gardening, vegetable-growing, and animal husbandry. There are secondary school, club, library and a medical centre in the village. It has a population of 306 in 2005.

== Armenian monuments ==
The Surp Shimavon church (a dome-less church dating from between the 12th and 17th century) was located in Paragha village. The church was destroyed at some point between 1997 and 2000.

In the countryside was the Surp Hakob monastery, dating from the 12th century, with its main church, probably from the 17th century, being a large domed basilica. The monastery was located adjacent to the slope of a hill 1 kilometre (0.62 miles) northwest of the village. It was destroyed at some point between 1997 and 2000.

There was an old Armenian cemetery located on high ground in the northern part of the village. The cemetery consisted of 800–820 tombstones. By August 13, 2009, the cemetery had been erased, its surface bulldozed and graded, and a subdivision of 13 new homes built atop the cemetery.

== Demographics ==
According to the Russian Empire Census in 1897, where the village was mentioned as Paraga (Russian: Парага), it had a population of 935 consisting of 800 Armenian Apostolics and 135 Muslims. The village had 417 men and 518 women.

== See also ==
- St. Shmavon Church (Paragha)
- St. Hakob-Hayrapet Monastery (Paragha)
