= St. Stepanos Monastery (Hin Poradasht) =

Armenian monastery in Azerbaijan

- Սուրբ Ստեփանոս վանք
- Location: Hin Poradasht
- Country: Azerbaijan
- Denomination: Armenian Apostolic Church

History
- Status: Destroyed
- Founded: 1385

Architecture
- Demolished: October 7, 2001 – November 11, 2009

St. Stepanos Monastery was an Armenian monastery located in Julfa District of the Nakhchivan Autonomous Republic of Azerbaijan. The monastery complex was located approximately 1.6 km northwest of abandoned Hin Poradasht village.

== History ==
The monastery was built in 1385. It was renovated in 1560, according to an Armenian inscription on a khachkar above the doorway on the eastern facade. It was renovated again in 1683, according to an inscription located near that entryway.

== Architecture ==
The monastery complex consisted of a main church and 12 to 15 auxiliary buildings enclosed within a perimeter wall that reached 6 to 8 m high. The church was a vaulted structure with a single nave and a five-sided apse with vestries on either side. Armenian inscriptions were set into the western facade and in the interior.

== Destruction ==
The monastery was still extant on October 7, 2001. However, by November 11, 2009, the monastery's foundations had been razed and the site graded, as documented by investigation of the Caucasus Heritage Watch.
