= Mesrovb Jacob Seth =

Indian historian (1871 – 1936)

- Mesrovb Jacob Seth
- Born: 1871; Calcutta, Bengal Presidency, British India
- Died: 1936 (aged 64–65); Calcutta, British India
- Occupations: Historian, writer, merchant
- Known for: Writings on the history of Armenians in India
- Notable work: Armenians in India: From the Earliest Times to the Present Day

Mesrovb Jacob Seth (Armenian: Մեսրովբ Յակովբ Սէթ or Սէթեանց, Mesrovb Hakovb Set’iants’; 15 March 1871 – 31 October 1939) was an Armenian author, historian and educator in Calcutta. He was examiner of Modern and Classical Armenian at the University of Calcutta. He is best known for his writings on the history of Armenians in India.

== Biography ==
Mesrovb Jacob Seth (the anglicized version of his Armenian name, Mesrovb Hakovb Setiants) was born on 15 March 1871 in the Armenian colony of New Julfa near Isfahan, Iran, to Hakovb (Jacob) and Vardeni Setiants. His father was the brother-in-law of the noted Armenian author Mesrop Taghiadian, of whom Seth was a great admirer. Seth received his primary education at the Protestant missionaries' school in his hometown. In 1889, Seth's family emigrated to Calcutta, India, where he attended the Armenian College as a day scholar for a year. After graduating, he passed the entrance examinations of the University of Calcutta. He attained success as a scholar, especially of Classical Armenian, his favourite subject, of which he was an ardent lover and noted exponent. He was one of the few Armenian authors in his time who continued to write in Classical Armenian. In 1895, he was appointed examiner of Modern and Classical Armenian of the University of Calcutta, a position he held for the rest of his life.

Seth worked as a jeweller to make a living, although he devoted all of his free time to his literary activities and historical research. He displayed extraordinary aptitude for and interest in historical and antiquarian research and for many decades engaged himself energetically in the study of old manuscripts, letters, epitaphs and memorial tablets in churches and cemeteries throughout India and presenting these collectively and intelligently to his compatriots and to those interested in these studies. He was appointed a member of the Indian Historical Records Commission in 1925. He was also a member of the Royal Asiatic Society of Bengal and Royal Asiatic Society of Great Britain and Ireland.

Seth was active in the Armenian community of Calcutta and held several prominent positions in Armenian institutions. From 1910 to 1915, he was a member of the board of trustees of the Armenian College. He served as a member of the administration of Calcutta's Armenian Church of the Holy Nazareth on several occasions and was vice-president of the local branch of the Armenian General Benevolent Union.

Mesrovb J. Seth died on 31 October 1939 at the age of 68. He never married and had no children. He is buried in St. Gregory the Illuminator Armenian Church in Calcutta. Seth's personal papers, including several unpublished works, were reportedly sold and lost after his death.

== Bibliography ==
During his lifetime, Seth wrote and published the following books/papers:

- History of the Armenians in India (1895) ISBN 9781593330491
- Is Classical Armenian Dead? (1923)
- The Republic of Armenia (1924) ISBN 978-0520019843
- The Society of Mekhithar (1924)
- Grich Voskegrich Matenagrin (1926, in Armenian)
- Armenians and the East India Company (1926)*
- Hindoos in Armenia (1927)*
- Gorgin Khan (1928)*
- Khojah Petrus (1929)*
- Armenians at Agra and Gwalior (1930)*
- Agah Catchick Arrakiel (1931)*
- Armenians at Chandernagore (1931)*
- The Oldest Christian Grave in Calcutta (1932)*
- The Second Oldest Christian Church in Bengal (1936)*
- Armenians as Political Stepping-Stones (1936)*
- Armenians in India from the Earliest Times to the Present Day (1937)
- Madras, the Birthplace of Armenian Journalism (1937)

The works marked with an asterisk (*) are included in Armenians in India from the Earliest Times to the Present Day, published in 1937.

Seth also wrote several scholarly articles in Armenian in the journals Bazmavep and Handes Amsorya.

== Sources ==
- Aščean, Mesrop Ark῾․ (1993). Diwan, Mesrop D․ T῾ałiadean։ antip ōragrut῾iwnner, erker ew k῾ert῾uacner, vaweragrer, namakner [Divan, Mesrop D. Taghiadian: Unprinted Diaries, Works and Poems, Documents and Letters] (in Armenian). Erewan. pp. 588–589.
- Hananean, J̌․ G․ (1951). "Mesrovb Y. Sēt῾eanc῾ (1871—1939)" (PDF). Nor Azdarar (in Armenian) (2): 15–20.
- Seth, Mesrovb Jacob (1992). Armenians in India from the Earliest Times to the Present Day. New Delhi: Asian Educational Services.
- Seth, Mesrovb J. (1897). History of the Armenians in India from the Earliest Times to the Present Day. London: Luzac & Co.
- "Mesrovb Y. Sēt῾ean Nor-J̌ułayec῾i". Sion (in Armenian). 14 (1–2): 46–47. 1940.
