= Mtsghun =

Mtsghun (Armenian: Մծղուն, Russian: Мтсхун), an ancient settlement in Goghtn Region of Armenia, currently included into Ordubad District of Nakhchivan autonomy of Azerbaijan.

The settlement was destroyed yet in Middle-Ages. It was once famous for its church of St. Stepanos, where Armenian from the region used to come to pilgrimage.
