= Albert Edwin Avey =

American philosopher (1886–1963)

- Born: 29 May 1886; Hannibal, Missouri
- Died: 25 September 1963 (aged 77); Denison, Ohio

Academic background
- Education: Yale University (PhD)
- Thesis: An Analysis of the Process of Conceptual Cognition (1915)

Academic work
- Discipline: Philosophy
- Institutions: Ohio State University
- Main interests: philosophy of religion

Albert Edwin Avey (29 May 1886 – 25 September 1963) was an American philosopher and Professor of Philosophy at Ohio State University. He is known for his works on conceptual cognition and the philosophy of religion.

== Books ==
- Handbook in the history of philosophy. (New York : Barnes & Noble, 1954]
- Readings in philosophy, (Columbus, O., R.G. Adams and Co., 1921)
