= Mesrop Taghiadian =

19th-century Armenian author and educator (1803 – 1858)

- Մեսրոպ Դաւթեան Թաղիադեան
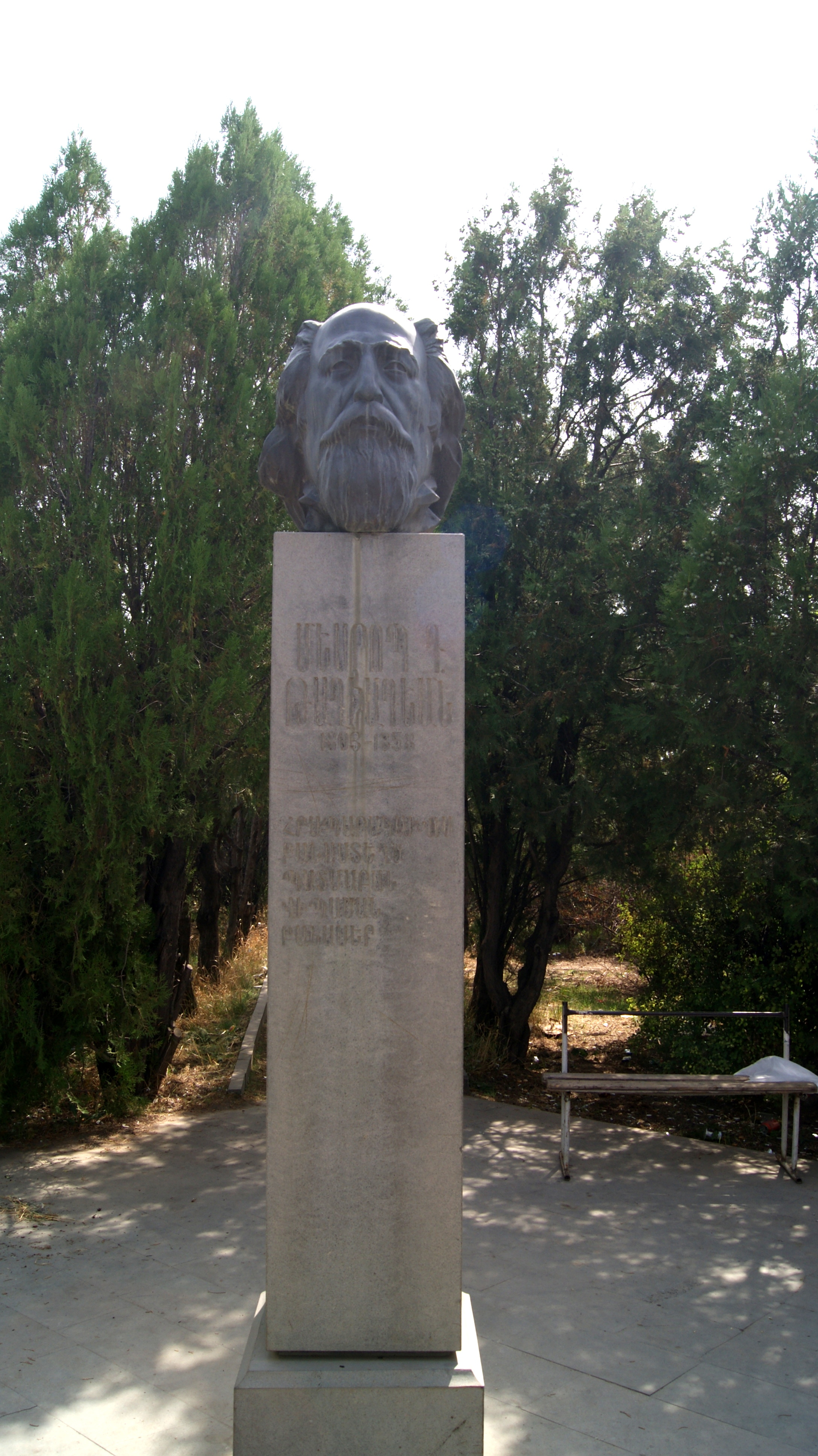
- Bust of Mesrop Taghiadian in the village of Karbi in Armenia
- Born: 2 January 1803; Yerevan, Erivan Khanate, Qajar Iran
- Died: 10 June 1858 (aged 55); Shiraz, Fars, Qajar Iran
- Resting place: Shiraz
- Occupations: Writer, educator

Signature
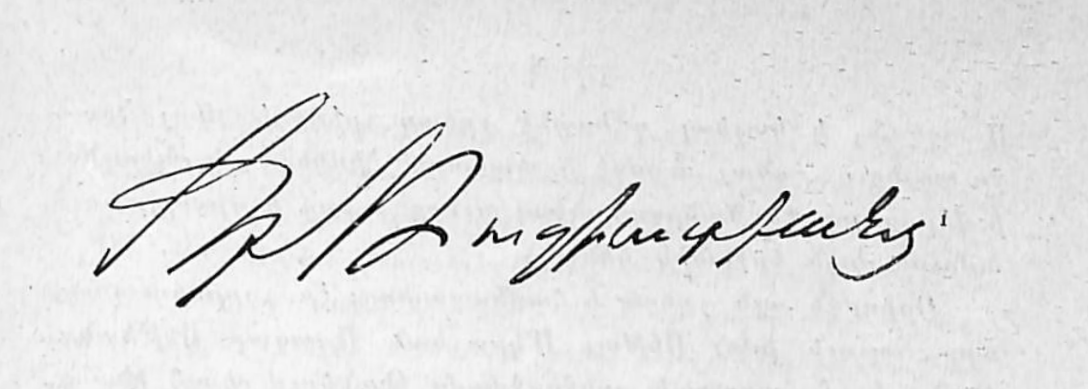

Mesrop Davtian Taghiadian or Taghiadiants (Armenian: Մեսրոպ Դաւթեան Թաղիադեան; (Note: Reformed orthography: Մեսրոպ Դավթյան Թաղիադյան. Different spellings of Taghiadian's surname can be found in his works, including Թաղիադեանց, T’aghiadeants' and Թաղիդեանց, T’aghideants'. He anglicized his name as Mesrop David Taliatin.) 2 January 1803 – 10 June 1858) was a nineteenth-century Armenian writer, educator and journalist. He wrote prolifically in Classical Armenian and is regarded as one of the first Armenian authors of the Romantic movement, as well as one of the earliest modern Armenian fiction writers.

Taghiadian was born in Iranian-ruled Armenia, but lived most of his life away from his homeland. He was educated at the seminary of Etchmiadzin and traveled throughout Armenia with his teacher collecting folk songs and oral traditions. He attained the rank of deacon in the Armenian Church. Taghiadian emigrated to India to pursue further education. He graduated from Bishop's College in Calcutta (then ruled by the British East India Company, now modern Kolkata) in 1830 and published his first literary works during his time there. In 1831, Taghiadian left India and unsuccessfully attempted to establish a school of his own, first in New Julfa, Iran, then in Armenia. He worked as a teacher in Iran and married Tangkhatun Setian, the daughter of an Armenian merchant, who died in 1837. Taghiadian then lived briefly in Constantinople, where he narrowly escaped a plot against him by the Armenian Patriarch and again settled in Calcutta. In the 1840s and 1850s, he published an Armenian periodical, Azgaser, and ran an Armenian school for boys and girls. Having closed his periodical and school and frequently clashing with other members of the Armenian community of Calcutta, Taghiadian decided to return to Armenia. He fell ill and died on the way to Armenia in Shiraz, Iran in 1858.

Taghiadian wrote works of fiction in prose and verse, as well as educational and historical works, travelogues, articles and translations of European authors. Among his notable works are the novels Vep Vardgisi (1846) and Vep Varsenkan (1847) and the long poem Sos yev Sondipi (1848). In his literary works, Taghiadian sought to both entertain and educate readers. His works preach the virtues of enlightenment, unity and patriotism to Armenians. He called on Armenians in the diaspora to immigrate to their homeland. In the pages of Azgaser, he also commented on non-Armenian matters, criticizing European colonialism.

== Biography ==
=== Early life and education ===
Mesrop Taghiadian was born in the Dzoragyugh neighborhood of Yerevan in the Erivan Khanate of Qajar Iran on 2 January 1803. His parents were from the village of Karbi. Taghiadian lost his father at a young age and was raised by his grandmother. He received his primary education at the seminary in Etchmiadzin. From 1816 to 1821, he traveled throughout the provinces of Eastern Armenia with a group of monks headed by his teacher Poghos Gharadaghtsi, collecting and recording folk songs and oral traditions. During this time, Taghiadian was made a deacon (sarkavag) of the Armenian Church. While at Haghpat Monastery, Taghiadian decided to travel to Paris via the Ottoman capital of Constantinople to receive a higher education, but was forced to abandon his plans and instead decided to go to India, which at the time was ruled by the British East India Company. In India, he was immediately hired as an assistant teacher at the Armenian College in Calcutta (now modern Kolkata). From 1826 to 1830, he studied at Bishop's College on a scholarship and received a master's degree. While at Bishop's College, he studied English, Latin, Greek and Persian, as well as theology and fine art. He published several works during this time, including translations into Classical Armenian of Hugo Grotius's De veritate religionis Christianae (1829) and Reginald Heber's poem Palestine (1830), as well as his own booklet titled Dits’abanut’iwn ("Mythology"). He also translated excerpts from William Shakespeare, Lord Chesterfield, John Milton, John Locke, Alexander Pope, Lord Byron, and Robert Burns into Armenian.

=== Travels and return to India ===
Rather over than medium size, his beard and eyes intensely black, each with a lustre peculiar to itself, with a quiet ease and grace about him and a knowledge "of men and things", not to be looked for, he was for a time a mystery. […] Every day he was in our family, our esteem for him increased. We found him a truly refined and cultured Christian gentleman. […] His soul kindled with enthusiasm at the thought of being engaged for life in teaching Armenian youth. It was his perfect ideal of a useful and happy life.

— Description of Taghiadian by American missionary Cyrus Hamlin

Taghiadian returned to Etchmiadzin in 1831 with the intention of opening his own school, after an unsuccessful attempt to do so in New Julfa in Iran. However, he faced hostility from the clerical establishment in Etchmiadzin and departed once again. He lived briefly in New Julfa (1834–1836), where he worked as a teacher and married Tangkhatun Setian, the daughter of a local Armenian merchant. (Note: Taghiadian's first wife was the paternal aunt of the noted Calcutta Armenian educator and historian Mesrovb Jacob Seth.) Both of their sons died at a young age. In late 1836, Taghiadian traveled to Tabriz, where he became the English teacher of one of the sons of Fath-Ali Shah (r. 1797–1834), the former Shah of Iran. In Tabriz, Taghiadian's financial situation remained dire, and in November 1837, his wife died. After this, Taghiadian returned to Armenia and then left for Constantinople. He lived there for about a year, working as a tutor in the home of a wealthy Armenian amira. Taghiadian was persecuted by the Armenian Patriarch of Constantinople Hakobos for his association with American Protestant missionaries. The patriarch had Taghiadian arrested and transported to Trabzon, whence he was to be deported to the Russian Empire and exiled to Siberia. However, he managed to escape from his captors in Trabzon and, after a number of misadventures, once again reached Calcutta in late 1839. In December 1839, he became the head of the Armenian section of the printing house of Bishop's College. He married for a second time in 1841 and worked as a peddler in Calcutta, although he never found success as a businessman.

Taghiadian published a number of works during his second sojourn in Calcutta, including the pedagogical works Aybbenaran (1840) and Mesrovbean sharadrich' (1840), the first part of a history of India titled Patmut’iwn hin Hndkastani (1841), and a work on the importance of girls' education Char' dastiarakut’ean oriordats'. In 1846, he published his novel Vep Vardgisi, an Armenian adaptation of Heinrich Zschokke's Abällino der große Bandit. His second novel, Vep Varsenkan (1847), was more original in content. Taghiadian published a collection of his poems in 1847 under the title T’ut’ak T’aghideants'. Also in 1847, he published Chanaparhordut’iwn i Hays, an account of his travels in Armenia. In 1848, he published a long poem in the Romantic style titled Sos yev Sondipi, a love story between an Indian prince and an Armenian. Most of his long poems were never completed.

=== Final years ===
From 1845 to 1852, Taghiadian published a periodical called Azgaser ("Patriot," later Azgaser araratean), which mainly published his own writings. He published articles on the importance of education, the economic and political development of Armenia, and unity among Armenians. Taghiadian welcomed the Russian conquest of Armenia in 1827 and called on Armenians in the diaspora to return to Armenia, seeing repatriation as the key to his homeland's development. In 1846, Taghiadian founded a coeducational Armenian school in Calcutta called Surb Sandukht ("Saint Sandukht", also known as the Armenian Infant Seminary), where he sought to apply contemporary European pedagogical methods. In 1852, Taghiadian moved his printing press and school to Chuchura north of Calcutta, but both were closed soon after. In 1858, having lost his second wife and being in constant conflict with the Calcutta Armenian community, Taghiadian decided to return to Armenia. He fell ill and died on the journey and was buried in Shiraz, at St Mary Armenian Church. Taghiadian's friend from Calcutta, Tadeos Avetumian, sent a headstone to Shiraz with the following Armenian inscription:

Armenian

Մեսրոպ Դաւթեան Թաղիադեան
Պերճ վարժապետ մեծ գիտնական
Վսեմ քերթող մատենագիր
Հանգիստ առ այս թուխ դամբան
Զքեզ հայոց գիտնոց տաճար,
Պատուասերէ միշտ սիրավառ
Եւ Նոր Ջուղա և Կալկաթա
Ոչ մոռասցեն զքեզ իսպառ։

Transliteration

Mesrop Davt’ean T’aghiadean
Perch varzhapet mets gitnakan
Vsem k’ert’ogh matenagir
Hangist ar' ays t’ukh damban
Zk’ez hayots' gitnots' tachar,
Patvasere misht siravar'
Yev Nor Jugha yev Kalkat’a
Voch' mor’asts’en zk’ez ispar'։

English translation

Mesrop Davtian Taghiadian
Illustrious teacher and great scholar
Sublime poet and writer
Rest in this dark tomb
All the Armenian learned
Shall always honor you enthusiastically
Neither New Julfa nor Calcutta
Will ever forget you.

== Views and style ==
Taghiadian saw education, learning and unity as the main means to Armenians' advancement as a nation, and his writings reflect this goal. He railed against superstition, ignorant clerics, and promoted enlightenment and patriotic ideals. Taghiadian's works are some of the earliest Armenian works in the Romantic style and express the author's humanist views and belief in the capacity for humans to change for the better. His novels represent some of the earliest examples of modern Armenian fictional prose. His novels Vep Vardgisi and Vep Varsenkan highlight the virtues of loyalty to one's ruler, national unity, personal integrity, and self-reliance. Taghiadian's poems have love and patriotism as their main themes. In his poem Sos yev Sondipi, Taghiadian expresses ideals of human equality and the social importance of individual happiness.

Like many contemporary and later Armenian writers, Taghiadian was concerned with the creation of a larger Armenian reading public. He believed that the existing Armenian literature was too serious and dense to interest widespread readership and sought to "combine entertainment with practical purposes" in his works. Unlike his contemporary Khachatur Abovian, who promoted the use of Modern Armenian as a literary language, Taghiadian wrote mainly in Classical Armenian, which he saw as a means of making his works accessible to all Armenians regardless of dialect. In the pages of his periodical Azgaser, he strove to write in a simpler style of Classical Armenian that would be more understandable for his readers.

In his articles, Taghiadian condemned colonialism and advocated for the rights of colonized peoples. He criticized what he saw as the hypocrisy of the colonizing powers, who claimed a high level of morality but committed numerous barbarous acts in their colonial conquests. In particular, Taghiadian criticized the economic exploitation of India by the British and the colonial authorities' indifference to poverty, which he saw firsthand in Calcutta. Although Taghiadian welcomed the conquest of Armenia by Russia as liberation from oppressive Persian rule, he vigorously opposed Russian serfdom and sympathized with the Decembrist rebels.

Taghiadian was an early Armenian advocate for women's education. In his 1828 letter to the people of Yerevan, he called on them to address the issue of women's education and attributed the strength of Britain and France to the freedom and literacy of women in those countries. In his work Char' dastiarakut’ean oriordats', he emphasized the importance of women's education for the overall benefit of the nation and society.

== Legacy and evaluation ==
Taghiadian did not think much of his own literary works, viewing himself more as a teacher and scholar than as a writer. However, his educational, literary and journalistic activities were highly regarded by many later Armenian authors, such as Mikayel Nalbandian, Raffi, Perch Proshian, and Shirvanzade. Nalbandian and Raffi praised Taghiadian's literary talent and ideals while lamenting that relatively few were familiar with his work. Nalbandian noted that this was partly because of Taghiadian's decision to write in Classical Armenian rather than the more accessible vernacular language. Shirvanzade considered Taghiadian to have been one of the most talented and sharp-minded poets of the first half of the nineteenth century. Kevork Bardakjian praises Taghiadian's epigrams as "witty" and his poetry as "subtle and warm." In his study of Mesrop Taghiadian, Leo values the author's work while criticizing his difficult language. He considered the novel Vep Varsenkan to be "overloaded with pious ideas" but ultimately "highly unattractive from the point of view of ideas" because it advocates for the total subordination of children to their parents' will. Taghiadian has been praised for his progressive views on women. Leo calls him "one of the first Armenian feminists, if it can be forgivable to use that word for [Taghiadian's] time" while noting that he was limited by the mentality of his time to viewing women's education only in the context of its benefits for society, not women themselves.

== Works ==
- Astuatsasēr ew azgasēr hasarakutʻean hayotsʻ pʻrkeal kʻaghakʻin Erewanay srbakrōn kʻahanayitsʻ, baretsnund ishkhanatsʻ ew hamayn barepastōn zhoghovrdotsʻ [To the pious and patriotic Armenian public, holy priests, noble-born princes and all the faithful people of the saved city of Yerevan], Calcutta, 1828
- Chshmartutʻiwn kʻristonēakan hawatoy, Calcutta, 1829 (translation of Hugo Grotius's De veritate religionis Christianae)
- Paghestin: Psakeal kʻertʻac, Calcutta, 1830 (translation of Reginald Heber's Palestine)
- Ditsʻabanutʻiwn [Mythology], Calcutta, 1830
- Mesrovbean aybbenaran [Mesropian Abecedary], Calcutta, 1840
- Mesrovbean sharadrichʻ hay ew angghiakan lezuatsʻ [Mesropian Composer of the Armenian and English Languages], Calcutta, 1840
- Patmutʻiwn hin Hndkastani yanyishatak darutsʻ anti tsʻyardzakumn mahmetakanatsʻ [History of Ancient India, from the earliest ages to the invasion of the Mahomedans], Calcutta, 1841
- Patmutʻiwn Parsitsʻ [History of Persia], Calcutta, 1846
- Vēp Vardgisi Tn. Tuhatsʻ [Novel of Vardges, Lord of the Tuhians], Calcutta, 1846
- Zuarchakhōs aṛakkʻ parsitsʻ [Humorous Persian Fables], Calcutta, 1846
- Tʻutʻak Tʻaghiadeantsʻ [Parrot Taghiadiants], Calcutta, 1847
- Karg ew kanonkʻ surb Sandukht dprotsʻi ōriordatsʻ ew paronkatsʻ [Rules and Regulations of the Saint Sandukht School for Girls and Boys], Calcutta, 1847
- Chanaparhordutʻiwn Mesrovbay Tʻaghiadeantsʻ V. A. sarkawagi srboy Ējmiatsni i Hays [Journey of Deacon of Holy Etchmiadzin Mesrop Taghiadiants, M. A., to Armenia], Calcutta, 1847
- Chaṛ dastiarakutʻean ōriordatsʻ [Discourse on the Education of Girls], Calcutta, 1847
- Mesrovbean aṛajnord mankantsʻ [Mesropian Handbook for Children], Calcutta, 1847
- Sōs ew Sōndipi [Sos and Sondipi], Calcutta, 1847 (reprinted in Constantinople in 1871)
- Vēp Varsenkan skayuhwoy aghuanitsʻ [Novel of Varsenik the Albanian Giantess], Calcutta, 1847
- Vkayabanutʻiwn srboyn Sandkhtoy [Martyrology of Saint Sandukht], Calcutta, 1847
- Chanaparhordutʻiwn M. D. Tʻaghideantsʻ i Parskastan [Journey of M. D. Taghideants to Persia], Calcutta, 1848
- Hamaṛōt kʻerakanutʻiwn haykazean lezui [Brief Grammar of the Armenian Language], Calcutta, 1848
- Tʻangaran Tʻaghiadeantsʻ [Taghiadiants Museum], Calcutta (date of publication unknown)
- Egherergutʻiwn yōrhas Tʻankay Tʻaghiadeantsʻ [Elegy on the Death of Tank Taghiadeants], Tiflis, 1893
- Gegharvestakan erker, Yerevan, 1965 (collection of Taghiadian's literary works, ed. Ruzan Nanumian)
- Ughegrutʻyunner։ Hodvatsner։ Namakner։ Vaveragrer [Travelogues, Articles, Letters, Documents], Yerevan, 1975 (eds. Ruzan Nanumian and Pion Hakobyan)
- Diwan, Mesrop D. Tʻaghiadean։ antip ōragrutʻiwnner, erker ew kʻertʻuacner, vaweragrer, namakner [Divan, Mesrop D. Taghiadian: Unprinted Diaries, Works and Poems, Documents and Letters], ed. Archbishop Mesrob Ashjian, New Julfa, 1979 (reprinted in Yerevan in 1993)
