= Əbrəqunus =

Village and municipality in the Julfa District of Nakhchivan, Azerbaijan

- Municipality
- Location within Azerbaijan
- Coordinates: 39°08′06″N 45°38′13″E
- Country: Azerbaijan
- Autonomous republic: Nakhchivan
- District: Julfa

Population
  - Total: 2,747
- Time zone: UTC+4 (AZT)

Əbrəqunus (Armenian: Ապրակունիս, romanized: Aprakunis) is a village and municipality in the Julfa District of Nakhchivan, Azerbaijan. It has a population of 2,747.

== History ==
A medieval Armenian monastery called Surp Karapet was located in Abrakunis. It stood intact but in a state of disrepair until shortly before 2005, when it was demolished. The main church in the monastery was built in 1381 over the ruins of a previous church. Internally, it was a domed basilica with four piers. The lower parts of the church were built with cut stone, but the dome and its tall drum were of brick and from a later repair. The interior had Persian-style frescoes from the 1740s. On the exterior walls were various relief carvings, crosses, eagles, etc. Beside the south wall was a small chapel dedicated to St. Stephanos. In 1705 a bell tower was added to the roof of this chapel. The main church of the monastic complex was still standing in the 1980s. The church and whatever was remaining from the monastic complex was already totally erased by October 7, 2001. On May 31, 2013, a newly constructed mosque was opened on the place of the former monastery.
