= Nürgüt =

Village and municipality in, Ordubad, Nakhchivan, Azerbaijan

- Municipality
- Location within Azerbaijan
- Coordinates: 39°13′30″N 45°53′54″E
- Country: Azerbaijan
- Autonomous republic: Nakhchivan
- District: Ordubad

Population (2005)
  - Total: 131
- Time zone: UTC+4 (AZT)

Nürgüt (also, Nurgyut, Nourgut and Dere Nurgut) is a village and municipality in the Ordubad District of Nakhchivan, Azerbaijan. It is located in the north-west from the district center, on the Ordubad plain. Its population is busy with gardening, beekeeping, animal husbandry. There are primary school, club in the village. It has a population of 131.

== Etymology ==
Its also called Dere ("valley" in Turkic) Nurgut because of its location in the valley. Toponym most likely in Persian means "new village", "new castle" which is the distorted version of the word Nourut in Persian.

== Monuments ==
There was an Armenian monastery, St. Targmanchats Monastery, in the village, located in its central part. The monastery was destroyed at some point between 1997 and 2006.
