= Xurs =

- Municipality
- Location within Azerbaijan
- Coordinates: 39°12′18″N 45°54′01″E
- Country: Azerbaijan
- Autonomous republic: Nakhchivan
- District: Ordubad

Population (2005)
  - Total: 156
- Time zone: UTC+4 (AZT)

Xurs (also, Khurs and Khurst) is a village and municipality in the Ordubad District of Nakhchivan, Azerbaijan. It is located near the Ordubad-Nurgut highway, northwest from the district center. Its population is busy with gardening, beekeeping, animal husbandry. There are secondary schools, clubs, and a medical center in the village. It has a population of 156.

== Etymology ==
The researchers believe that this name is a variant of the ethnonym of Gorus. Reportedly, in the 16th century the goruslar, one of the cattle-breeder tribes, were part of the tribes of Qizilbash. Following the settlements created in Shirvan by the Safavid shahs, they spread to different areas.
