= Karmir Monastery (Astapat) =

Former monastery near Nehram, Nakhchivan, Azerbaijan

- Կարմիր Վանք
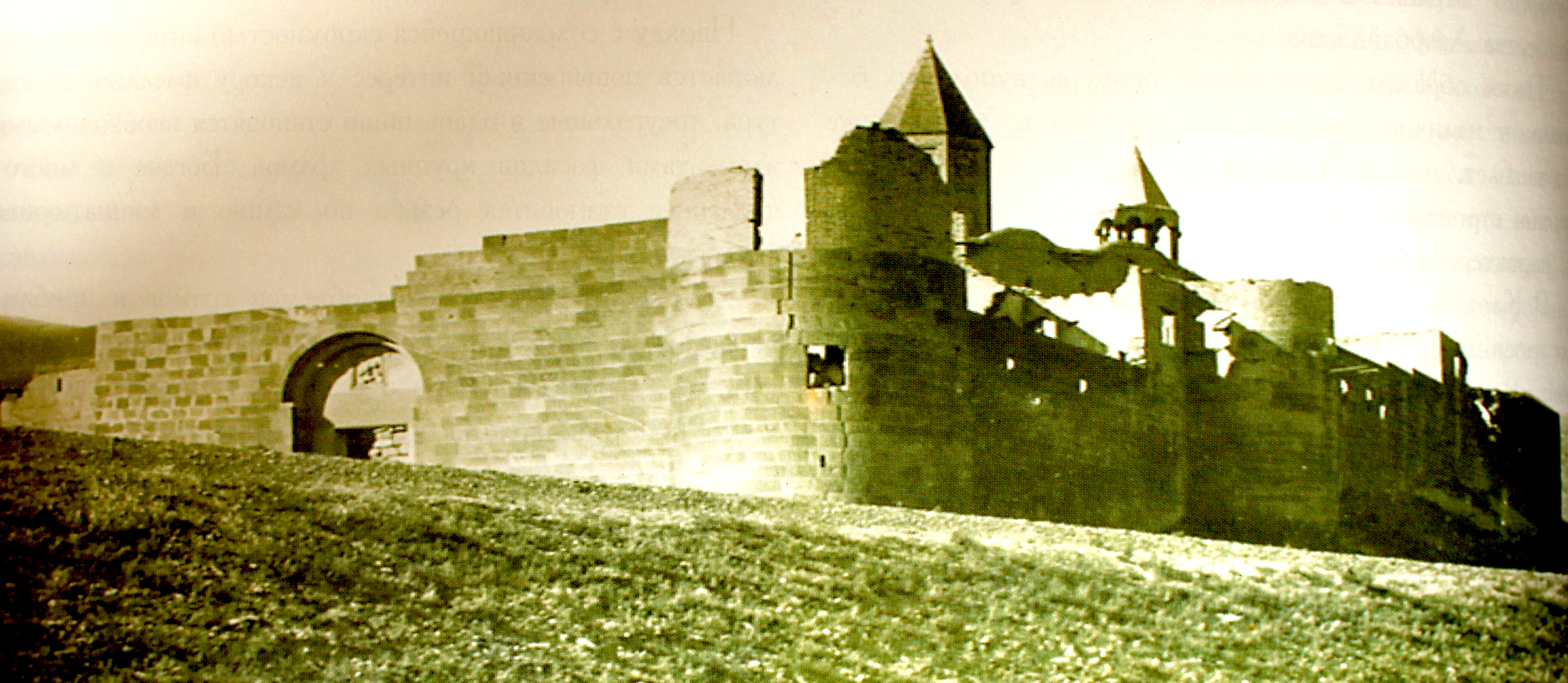

- Location within Azerbaijan

Monastery information
- Other name: Khndrakatar St. Stepanos or Astapat Monastery
- Denomination: Armenian Apostolic Church

Architecture
- Status: Destroyed

Site
- Location: Nehram
- Country: Azerbaijan
- Coordinates: 39.085204°N 45.403125°E

Karmir Monastery (Arm: Կարմիր Վանք) was a destroyed monastery, located near the Nehram village in the Nakhchivan Autonomous Republic of Azerbaijan. The monastery was also known as Khndrakatar St. Stepanos or Astapat Monastery.

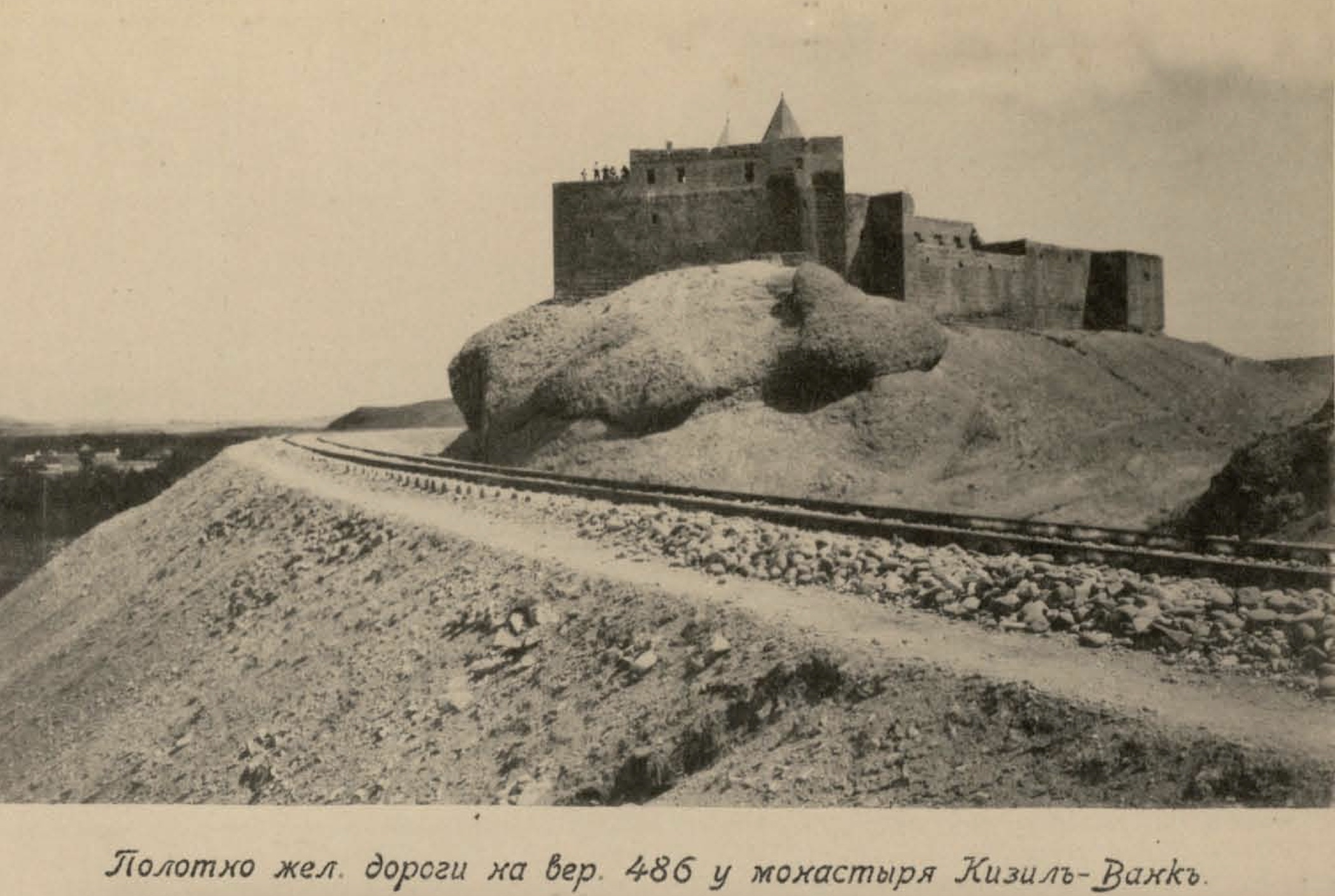
The monastery

== History ==
The monastery complex was founded in the 7th century. It is mentioned in 976 in the encyclical of Catholicos Khachik I. It was ruined and rebuilt several times - it underwent renovations in the 13th, 15th, 16th, 17th and 18th centuries. It was also damaged by the earthquake of 1841, after which it was renovated around 1860. At the beginning of the twentieth century the monastery was deserted and started to fall apart. Because of neglect, the dome of the church, the upper sections of the walls, the southwestern section of the roof, the southern wall of the porch, the outer walls, watchtowers, dwelling places, and auxiliary buildings have all collapsed.

== Architectural characteristics ==
In the 1980s, the only surviving part of the monastery complex was the semi-dilapidated church, which was a domed structure extending from east to west. It had a five-sided apse, two vestries, and a hall. The high-ceilinged cupola of the church stood on a square formed by the arches supported by two pairs of pillars and connecting the eastern pillars with the western wall of the apse. The only portal of the church was located on the western facade and opened onto the porch. The latter had a rectangular plan and two pillars. Using the slanted position of the church site, the builders constructed a lower level under the bema and the vestries that served as a hiding place where manuscripts and sacred utensils of the monastery were stored.

== Destruction ==
The monastery was still a standing monument in the 1980s. It was already destroyed by August 26, 2003, according to the research of the Caucasus Heritage Watch.
