= St. Astvatsatsin Monastery (Channab) =

Armenian monastery in Çənnəb, Azerbaijan

- Սուրբ Աստվածածին վանք
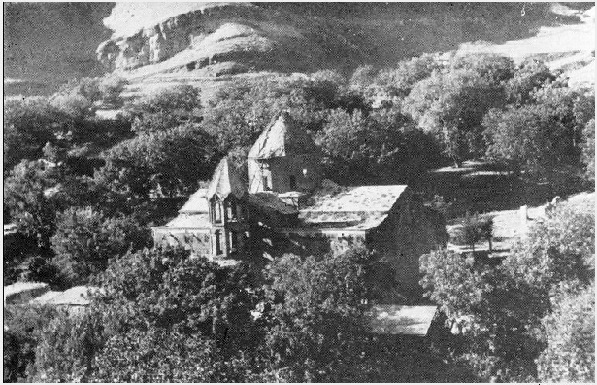
- Interactive map of St. Astvatsatsin Monastery

Monastery information
- Denomination: Armenian Apostolic Church

Site
- Location: Çənnəb
- Country: Azerbaijan

St. Astvatsatsin Monastery was an Armenian monastery located in Çənnəb village (Ordubad district) of the Nakhchivan Autonomous Republic of Azerbaijan. It was located in the northern district of the village.

== History ==
The church was renovated at the end of the 12th century, additional renovations took place in the 16th and 17th centuries, according to the epigraphic and literary sources.

== Architectural characteristics ==
The church of the monastery complex was a domed basilica with a large, bright apse, two vestries, and a hall. In the center of the roof rose a cupola with eight windows, supported by four cruciform pillars. A bell tower was attached to the south facade. Armenian inscriptions were set in the facades on all sides of the building, and there were sculptures under the arches to the entrances, in the corners, and on the bell tower.

== Destruction ==
The church of the monastery complex was still standing and well-preserved monument in the 1980s; however, it was destroyed and completely erased by February 3, 2000, as documented by the Caucasus Heritage Watch. The monastery had also an Armenian cemetery with 180–200 tombstones. The cemetery was adjacent to the northern, western, and eastern walls of the monastery. The cemetery was also destroyed by February 3, 2000.

== See also ==
- St. Sargis Church (Channab)
- St. Stepanos Monastery (Channab)
