= Mesropavan =

Village in Goghtn Region, Armenia

Mesropavan (Armenian: Մեսրոպավան, Russian: Месропаван) is a historical village in Goghtn Region of Armenia, currently included into Ordubad region of Nakhchivan autonomy of Azerbaijan.

== Name ==
Mesropavan is named after Mesrop Mashtots, founder of the Armenian Alphabet, who lived in the village for years in the 5th century.

== History ==
The region has numerous caves with interesting petroglyphs. Also there are remains of numerous old-age buildings and a monastery, where Mesrop Mashtots preached, build in 456 AD.
