= Çənnəb =

Village and municipality in, Ordubad, Nakhchivan, Azerbaijan

- Municipality
- Location within Azerbaijan
- Coordinates: 39°01′03″N 45°54′12″E
- Country: Azerbaijan
- Autonomous republic: Nakhchivan
- District: Ordubad

Population (2005)
  - Total: 507
- Time zone: UTC+4 (AZT)

Çənnəb (also, Çənənəb, Chananab and Channab) is a village and municipality in the Ordubad District of Nakhchivan, Azerbaijan. It is located at the foot of the mountain, 32 km in the north-west from the district center. Its population is busy with gardening, beekeeping, farming and animal husbandry. There are secondary school, library, club and a medical center in the village. It has a population of 507.

== Historical and Archaeological monuments ==
=== Channab Bridge ===
Channab Bridge is located 12 km from the Channab village, in the territory of the district of Ordubad, on the Düylün River. Its length is 10 pagonameters. It is assumed that it have been built in the beginning of the 19th century. The bridge, built in the highest construction technique has kept the level of national architecture and its hardness. In 1996, as a result of the reconstruction of the bridge, the Channab village has got access to the highway.

There was an Armenian monastery, St. Astvatsatsin Monastery, in the village. The monastery was still standing and well-preserved monument in the 1980s, however it was destroyed by February 2000.

There was also an Armenian church, St. Sargis Church, in the village. The church was standing and intact as of February 3, 2000 and was destroyed between February 2000 and August 13, 2009.

St. Stepanos Monastery was another Armenian monastery located some 3 km south of the village. The monastery was destroyed between February 3, 2000, and November 24, 2010.

== Notable natives ==
- Stepan Zorian

== See also ==
- St. Astvatsatsin Monastery (Channab)
- St. Stepanos Monastery (Channab)
- St. Sargis Church (Channab)
