= Saint Sarkis Monastery of Gag =

Ruined monastery in Azerbaijan

Coordinates: 41.1414°N 45.2661°E

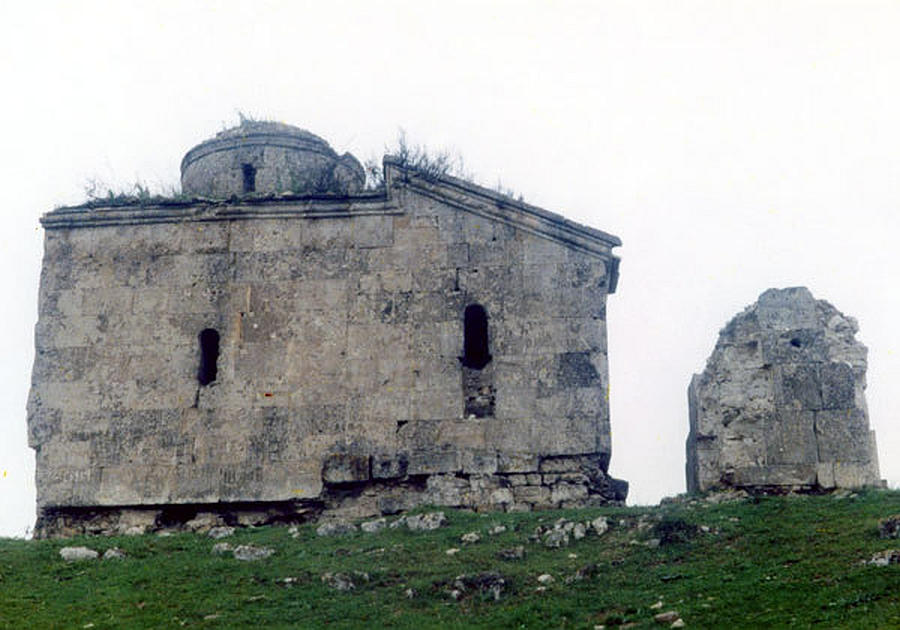
Saint Sarkis Monastery of Gag

Saint Sarkis Monastery of Gag (Armenian: Գագա Սուրբ Սարգիս Վանք, Gaga Surp Sarkis Vank) is a ruined, medieval Armenian Apostolic monastery in the Qazakh Rayon of the Republic of Azerbaijan. It is located about 500 metres to the east of the present-day border of Armenia, and four kilometres west of the village of Dash Salakhly. The monastery is built at the top of Gag Mountain, at an altitude of 922 metres above sea level and 420 metres from the foot of the mountain.
