= Naghash Hovnatan =

Armenian poet

Naghash Hovnatan Նաղաշ Հովնաթան
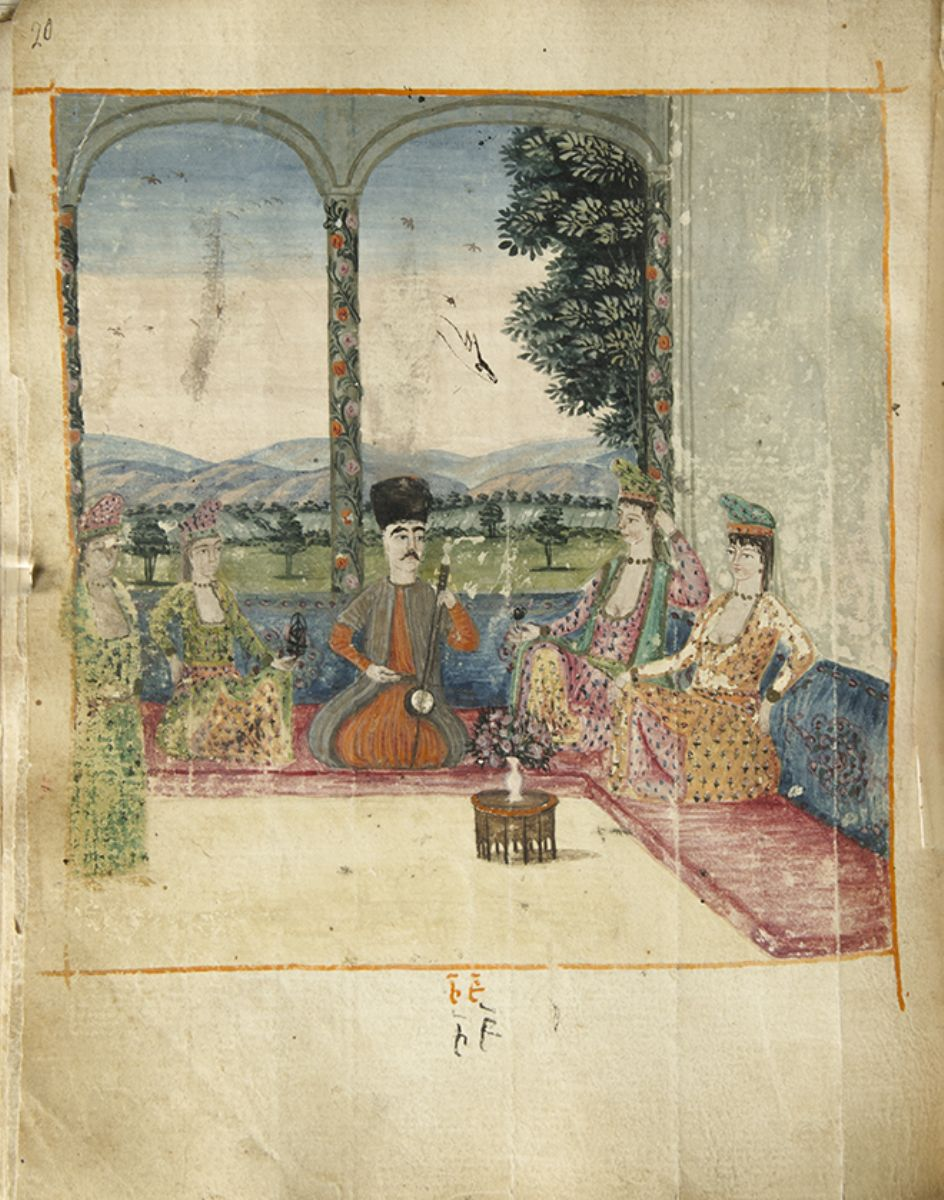
- 18th century drawing of Naghash Hovnatan
- Born: 1661 Shorot, Nakhijevan, Safavid Iran (modern-day Nakhchivan Autonomous Republic, Republic of Azerbaijan)
- Died: 1722 (aged 60–61) Shorot, Nakhijevan
- Occupation: poet, ashugh, painter

Naghash Hovnatan (Armenian: Նաղաշ Հովնաթան; 1661, Shorot, Nakhijevan, Safavid Iran – 1722, Shorot) was an Armenian poet, ashugh, painter, and founder of the Hovnatanian artistic family. He is considered the founder of the new Armenian minstrel school, following medieval Armenian lyric poetry.

== Biography ==
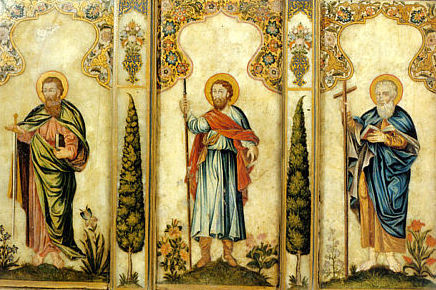
Naghash Hovnatan's work in the Etchmiadzin Cathedral

Hovnatan was born to a priestly family in Nakhijevan (at the time part of the Erivan Province in the Safavid Empire) in the village of Shorot. He studied at the Saint Thomas Monastery in Agulis. Hovnatan spent most of his life in Tbilisi and Yerevan and is considered one of the most prominent representatives of late medieval secular Armenian poetry, his work is closest to the work of ashughs. In 1710 he moved to Tbilisi, where, in addition to being a painter, he also became a court ashugh. Hovnatan authored more than a hundred satirical, romantic, drinking, and edifying or admonitory songs and odes.

As a painter, Hovnatan undertook the interior decoration of the Etchmiadzin Cathedral in 1712, which was completed by 1721. The nickname "naghash" means "painter" in Persian.

In 1983, a collection of his poems in Armenian was published in Yerevan.

== See also ==
- Armenian literature
- Music of Armenia
- Hovnatanian family
