= Şurud =

Village and municipality in the Julfa District of Nakhchivan, Azerbaijan

- Municipality
- Location within Azerbaijan
- Coordinates: 39°09′05″N 45°47′42″E
- Country: Azerbaijan
- Autonomous republic: Nakhchivan
- District: Julfa

Population (2005)
  - Total: 180
- Time zone: UTC+4 (AZT)

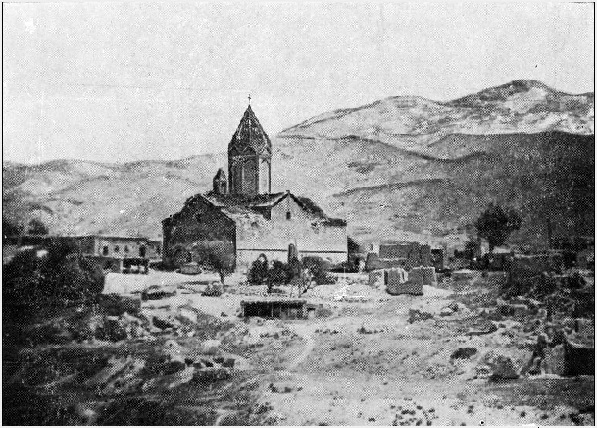
St. Hakob-Hayrapet Church

Şurud (anglicized as Shurud), also Shorot (Armenian: Շոռոթ) or Shurut (Armenian: Շուրութ) is a village and municipality in the Julfa District of Nakhchivan, Azerbaijan. It is located 23 km to the north of the district center, on the slope of the Zangezur mountain range.

It has a population of 180, primarily occupied in farming and animal husbandry. There are a secondary school, a club, a library, a communication center, and a medical center in the village.

== History ==
Shurut was a small Armenian-populated town during the late medieval period, with churches, schools, monasteries, scriptoriums, and a population of several tens of thousands. It is first mentioned in historical sources from the 13th century.

== Monuments ==
- St. Hakob-Hayrapet Church was a 12th-century Armenian church located in the center of the village and was destroyed at some point between 1997 and 2006.
- St. Astvatsatsin Monastery or Kusakan Monastery was an Armenian monastery located 1 km north of the village and was razed to ground at some point between 1997 and 2006.
- St. Gr. Lusavorich Monastery was an Armenian monastery located 1.5–2 km northeast of the village and was destroyed at some point between 1997 and 2006.
- St. Stepanos Monastery was a 9-10th century Armenian monastery located near the village and destroyed at some point between 1997 and 2006.
- Main Cemetery of Shurud was an Armenian cemetery consisting of 500-510 tombstones and was located in the northern part of the village. The cemetery was destroyed at some point between 1997 and June 15, 2006.

== Notable people ==
- Naghash Hovnatan (1661–1722), Armenian poet, ashugh, painter, and founder of the Hovnatanian artistic family

== See also ==
- St. Hakob-Hayrapet Church (Shurud)
- St. Astvatsatsin Monastery (Shurud)
- St. Gr. Lusavorich Monastery (Shurud)
- St. Stepanos Monastery (Shurud)
