= Goghtn =

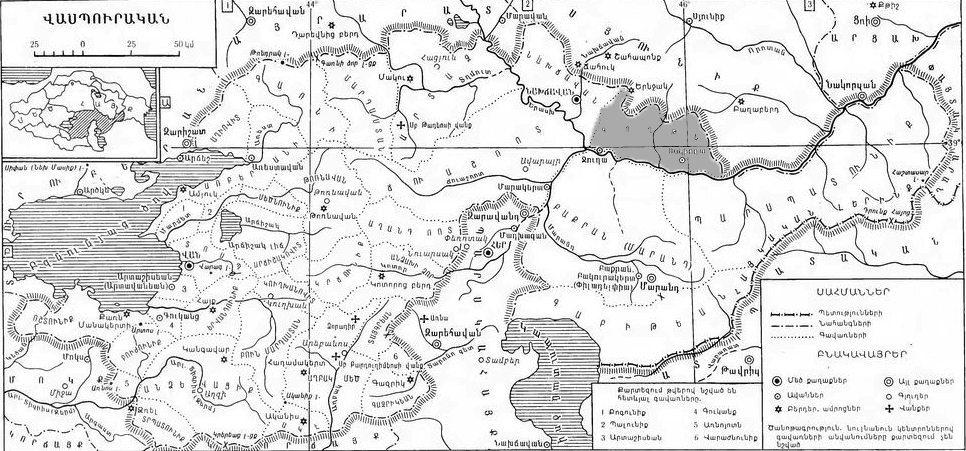

Goght’n (Armenian: Գողթն; also mentioned in sources as Goght’an, Գողթան, and alternatively transliterated as Gołt῾n) was a canton (gavar’) located in the province of Vaspurakan in historical Armenia. Its borders roughly corresponded to the modern Ordubad Rayon of Nakhichevan, Azerbaijan.

Goght’n was well known for winemaking, the quality of its grape and fruit orchards. The region also was the birthplace of a number of prominent Armenian gusans (minstrels). The ancestors of the renowned twentieth-century Armenian composer and music ethnologist Komitas Vardapet were originally from Goght’n. Some of the region's oldest towns and villages have survived to this day, including Jugha (now Julfa) and Ordvat’ (modern-day Ordubad).

== History ==
=== Early to medieval ===
According to Movses Khorenatsi, King Tigran Ervanduni (of the Orontid line) of Armenia settled his wife and his daughters in an area to the east of (Ararat) and up to Goght’n, in Tambat, Oskiokh, Djaghguyn and other settlements giving them also three towns – Khram, Jugha and Khoshakunik, and on the other bank of the river (Arax) all the fields from Ajanakan up to the Nakhchavan Fortress. Mesrop Mashtots, the inventor of the Armenian alphabet, is assumed to have lived and worked in the town of Msrvanis (Mesropavan) during his stay in Goght’n. The Armenian princes of Goght’n probably had branched off from the family in Syunik’ and had their own regional bishop. The second Gahnamak, or Military List, notes that the princes were expected during time of war to furnish 500 cavalry to help defend the Kingdom of Armenia's southern gate (that is, its southern border).

The seventh-century Armenian atlas Ashkharhats’uyts’ mentions Goght’n as the 31st of the 35 districts of Vaspurakan. Its last hereditary Armenian prince, Vahan, who had been brought up in Damascus as a Muslim, converted back to his Christian faith after returning to Armenia. For this act of apostasy, he was seized by the Muslims and sent to Syria, where he was tortured and executed in 737. Sometime in the early tenth century, during the tenure of the emir of Iranian Azerbaijan Yusuf ibn Abi'l-Saj, Goght’n fell to a Muslim emir called, by the contemporary Armenian historian Hovhannes Draskhanakertts'i, Agarene, probably from the Arab Shaybani tribe. Goght’n may have been referred to at this time as Kilit by the Arabs. When the fortress of Yernjak fell to Yusuf in 912/14, Yusuf awarded it to the emir, whose successors sought to expand their landholdings through the course of the tenth century. The city of Nakhchavan was taken, though by the second half of the ninth century the emir of Goght’n had lost it to the Bagratuni kings of Armenia. The emirs of Goght’n and Armenians kings continued to struggle over control of the Arax River Valley until King Gagik I (r. 989–1020) reduced them at end of the tenth century. It was later overrun by the Seljuks, passing under the control of the Mongols and later Safavid Persia.

=== Early modern to modern ===
In 1604, the region was depopulated by Shah Abbas I and its Armenian inhabitants deported to Iran. Goght’n became a part of the khanate of Nakhichevan in the mid-1700s and was divided into five districts (mahals): Ordubad, Agulis, Dasht, Belev, and Chananab. In 1752, it was attacked and subjugated by Azad Khan.

In the early twentieth century, Goght'an was the name given to the subregion of Sharur-Nakhichevan by the government of the First Republic of Armenia. Its administrative center was at Agulis, with commissar Ashot Melik-Musian and militia chief Movses Giulnazarian at its head. The region suffered intense fighting during a brief conflict between Armenia and the Azerbaijan Democratic Republic in the latter half of 1919, including the destruction of Agulis in December by a Muslim mob.

== Monuments ==
A number of historical Armenian churches were once found in Goght’n. These included Basilica of St. James in Shor’ot’, the Monastery of St. Thomas the Apostle in Upper Agulis, Holy Mother of God Church in Ts’gnay, and Monastery of St. Mesrop in Msrvanis.
