= Agulis (historical village) =

Historical Armenian village

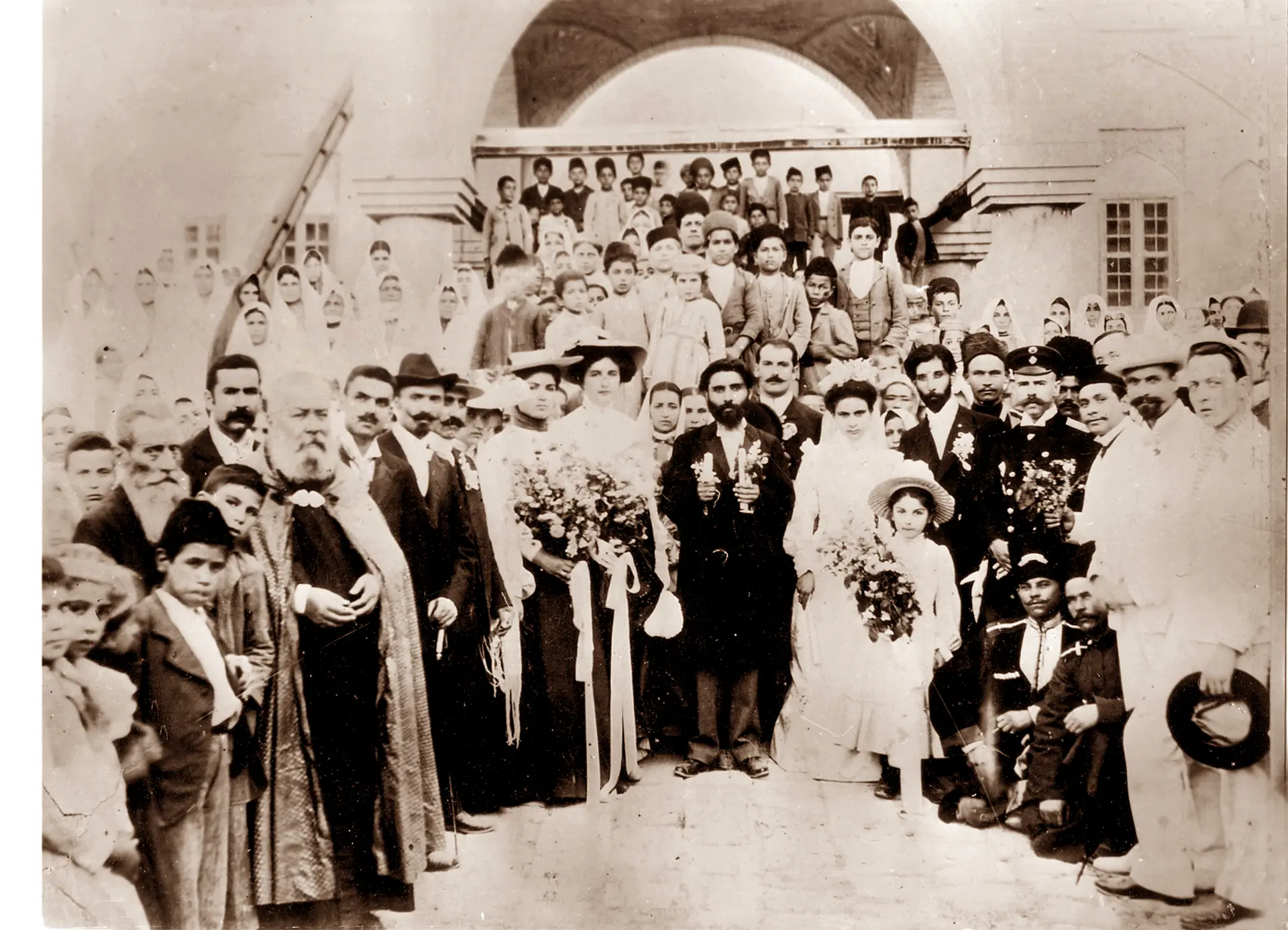
An Armenian wedding party in Agulis in December 1919.

Agulis (or Augulis, Aguillar, or Akoulis) was a historical Armenian village located in the Nakhichevan region of present-day Azerbaijan. The village played an essential role in Armenian history due to its cultural, strategic, and historical significance. Dozens of Armenian churches existed up until 1919 when the Armenian population was massacred by Azeri and Turkish soldiers and which resulted in the destruction of the town.

== History ==
Agulis was an important center of Armenian culture and learning. The village was home to several notable Armenian schools, monasteries, and churches, including the Surb Astvatsatsin Church, also known as the Church of the Holy Mother of God, which was built in the 17th century. The church is known for its unique architectural design and its impressive wall paintings. The village was also home to several renowned Armenian scholars, writers, and religious leaders. During the 13th and 14th centuries trade among Asia Minor and Italy was provided mainly by Armenians, also many Armenian families in Agulis and Siunik were involved in the Italian trade.

As a strategic fortress town, Agulis played a vital role in the defense of the Armenian kingdom against foreign invaders. The village was located along the border of the Armenian and Persian empires and was frequently attacked and occupied by hostile forces. Despite these challenges, Agulis remained a symbol of Armenian resistance and resilience for centuries. During the Seljuk invasion of Armenia in the 11th century, the village became a refuge for Armenian monks and scholars, and it played a significant role in preserving Armenian culture and language during a time of crisis.

Evidence of the organization of education, the art of copying manuscripts and the cultural life of Agulis dates back to the 12th-17th centuries. During this period, significant work was carried out in the schools and scriptoria of the Monastery of St. Thomas the Apostle and the Church of St. Christopher. Manuscripts distinguished by miniatures and the art of binding were copied here. The Monastery of St. Thomas the Apostle, which occupied a central place in the cultural life of Agulis due to its historical past, was also a repository of manuscripts.

Since the 16th century, Agulis was one of the key trade and economic centers of Eastern Armenia. It was a city with active trade relations with Russia, Persia, Western Europe and India. Its wealthy class was made up of Armenian merchants (khodja). Trade in Agulis required education and was conducted within the framework of the Armenian trade school, the center of which was New Jugha.

In the 16th century, with the rise of the Safavid dynasty to power in Persia, Agulis became part of the Safavid Persian Empire.

In the 17th century, Zakaria Aguletsi called Agulis by the name "Dasht". After the destruction of the nearby important trade center of Jugha by the Persian authorities and the forced resettlement of most of the local Armenians deep into Persia, Agulis became a large city, the population of which reached 10 thousand people by the end of the 17th century, which was due to the fact that it was not affected by the deportation. Here, at the school of the monastery of St. Thomas the Apostle, the founder of the famous Ovnatanyan family of artists, a prominent Armenian artist and ashugh Naghash Hovnatan received his education.

Many residents of Agulis were traditionally engaged in trade and entrepreneurship. Their activities extended along the ancient trade routes (the "Silk Road") connecting the East and the West. These routes passed along the Araks River, near which Agulis was located. The merchants of Agulis had close ties with the Armenian merchants first of Jugha, and after its destruction, of New Jugha in Persia. The merchants of Jugha, and then of New Jugha, played a key role in international trade between the Persian Safavid Empire and Europe. It can be said that Agulis was the closest satellite of Jugha and New Jugha in trade relations and was part of their trade empire built on trust networks in a special position. In New Jugha, the Agulis people founded a separate quarter, Dashtetsots, from which came the famous dynasty of Russian aristocrats, the Lazarevs. The colonies of the Agulis people stretched from Venice and Livorno to Tiflis and Astrakhan. Among Armenians and local Muslims, the Agulis people were associated with rich and successful merchants, and the city was known by the informal name "Golden Gorge". In the 18th century, part of the Armenian population of Agulis professed Catholicism, which reflected the fact that the Catholic mission was active along the trade routes connecting Europe and Persia.

The Agulis trade routes passed along the Agulis-Tabriz-Isfahan, Agulis-Tabriz-Maragha, Agulis-Yerevan-Karin-Tokhat, Agulis-Smyrna-Istanbul routes, and other cities and settlements. Agulis merchants took part in the trade between Ottoman Turkey and Safavid Iran, as well as in the Ottoman Empire's trade with Europe. Agulis merchants owned quite large plots of land.

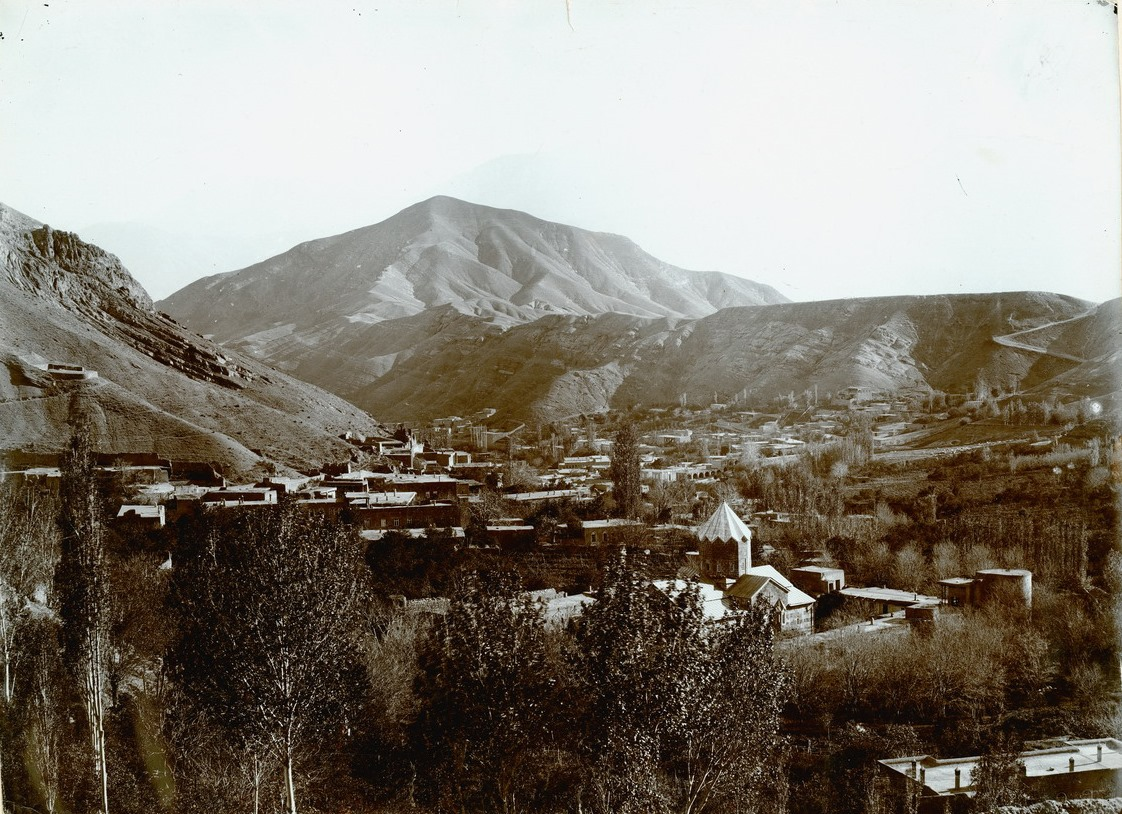
Saint Thomas Monastery of Agulis

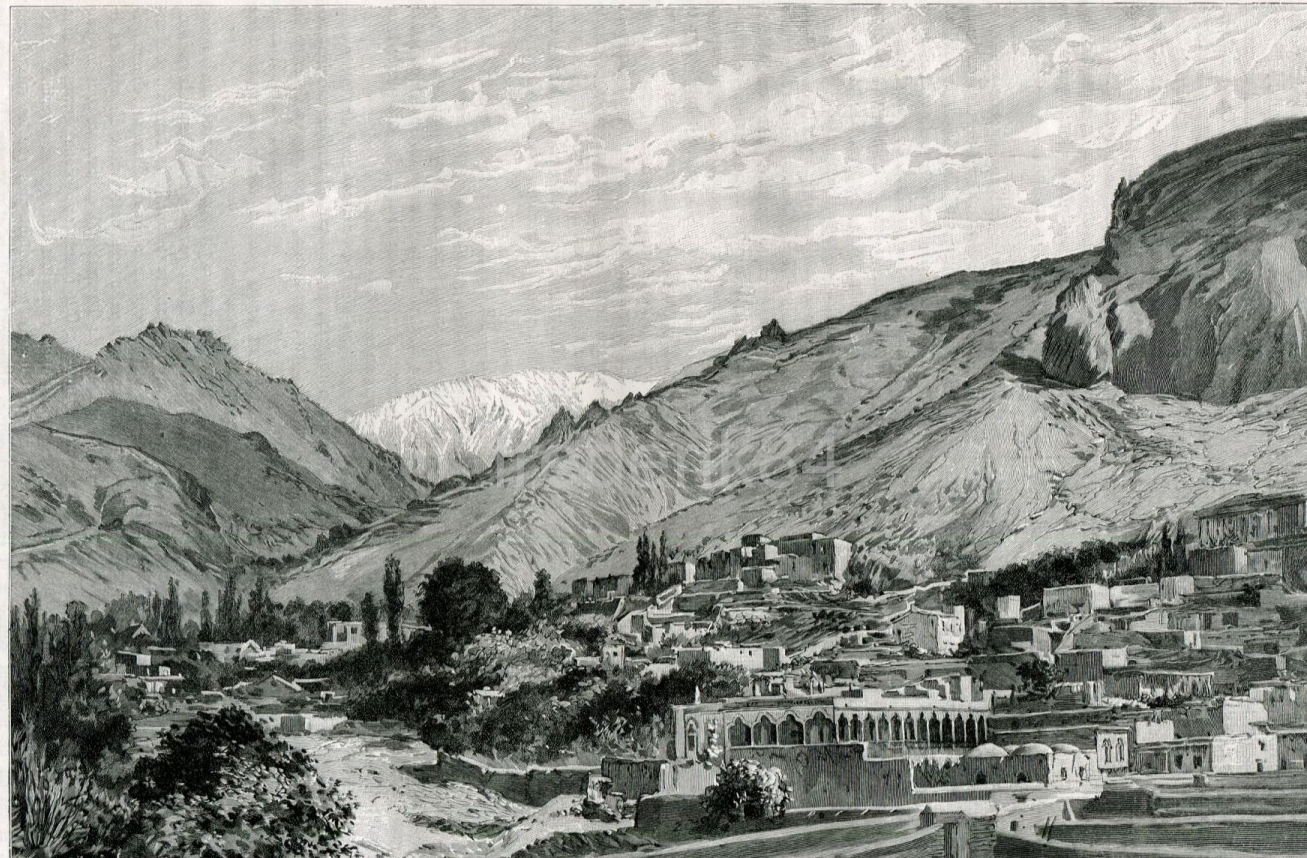
Agulis in 1891

Against the backdrop of the decline of the Safavid Persian Empire in the mid-18th century, the city of Akulis was ravaged and plundered by Afgan ruler Azad Khan. As a result, a large number of Armenians died of hunger, and many of them were forced to leave the city. In the 18th century, the city's population was constantly oppressed by local quasi-independent authorities, despite the fact that the settlement had a special status of "khass", which made it subordinate directly to the shah, which partially protected it from the tyranny of local rulers and reduced taxes. However, these mechanisms worked less and less as the central power in the Safavid state weakened. The situation improved significantly in 1828 after the annexation of the territory of the Nakhichevan Khanate to the Russian Empire. During the 19th and early 20th centuries, Agulis experienced a period of relative stability and prosperity.

In the 19th century, the famous Armenian writer Raffi taught at the gymnasium in Agulis. One of the three founders of the Dashnaktsutyun party, Christophor Mikaelyan, was also from Agulis, and the other founder, Stepan Zorian, was a native of the neighboring village of Tskhna. Raffi and Mikaelyan, like some other prominent Armenian intellectuals, received assistance from the merchant and philanthropist Melkon Panyants (Paniev), a native of Agulis who lived in Moscow, had the title of "Honorary Citizen of the City" and was the church warden of the Surb Khach Church (since 1868) on Armenian Lane, as well as an advisor to the board of the Armenian Lazarevsky School. Yakov Davtyan, who became the first head of Soviet foreign intelligence and played an important role in its development, was born in Agulis in 1888. In 1914, Agulis was visited by the famous artist Martiros Saryan, who expressed admiration for the village's architecture and the surrounding natural beauty.

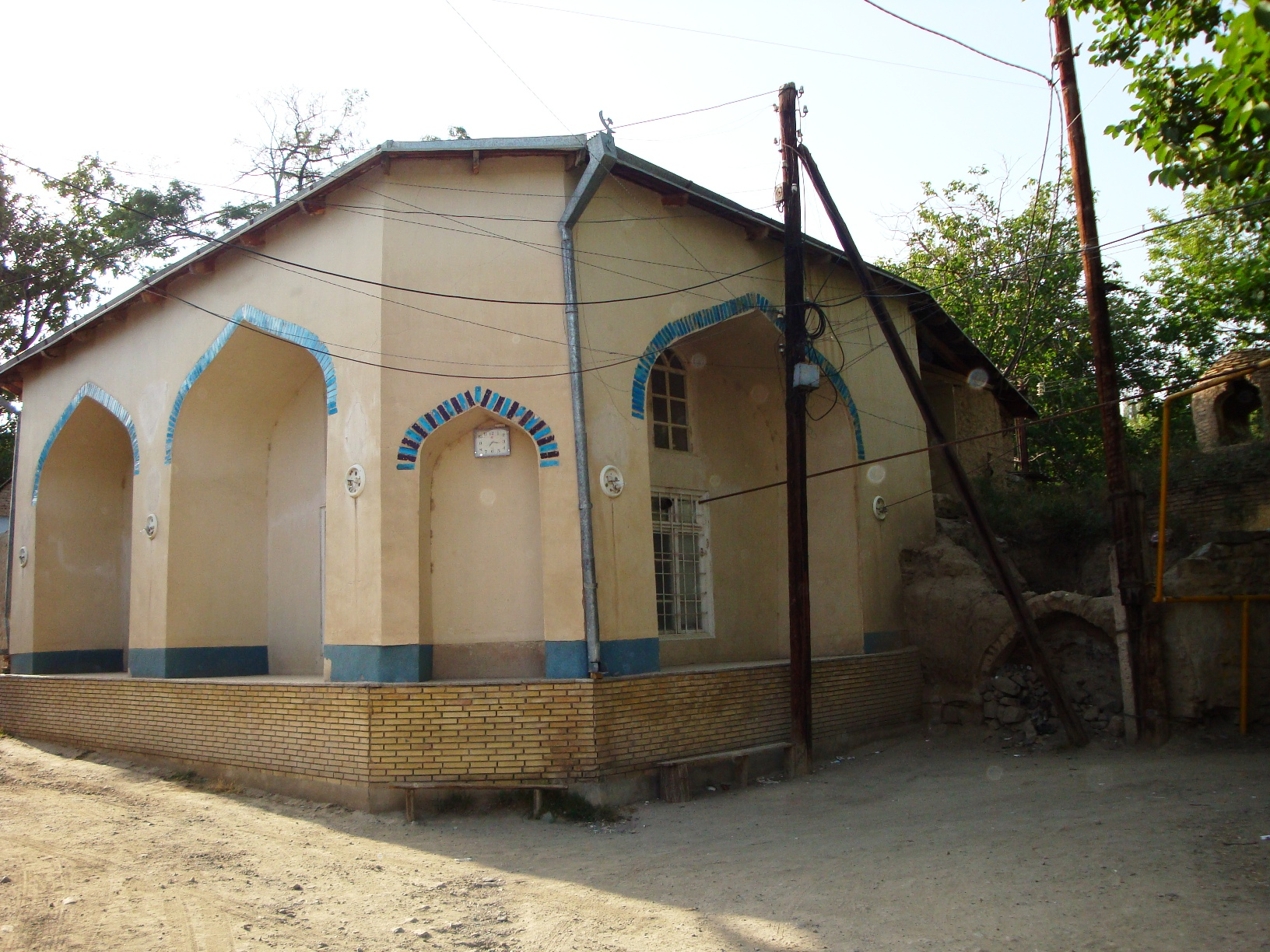
Old mosque in Ashagy-Aylis

By the end of the 19th century, there were 11 churches in Agulis: the monastery of St. Tovma, St. Christopher, St. Hovhannes, St. Hakob Hayrapetats, St. Stepanos, etc. The Aguletsots temple in Shusha was also built by people from the city.

Among the Armenian residents of Agulis and their descendants, there was an opinion that they were "Armenian Jews", although the meaning of this name remains unclear, since they traditionally professed Christianity. The inhabitants of Agulis and the surrounding villages ("Zokstan") formed a separate ethnographic group of Armenians known as Zoks. They spoke their own dialect, which was poorly understood by many Armenians living in other areas. For this reason, there was an opinion among Armenians that it was a special language developed by merchants from Agulis, which allowed them to talk to each other so that others did not understand the meaning of the conversation.

According to the 1897 census, 649 people lived in Lower Akulis, all Armenians. In Upper Akulis, 1,325 Armenians and 639 Azerbaijanis.

Agulis was partially destroyed in December 1919 during the interethnic and interreligious clashes in Transcaucasia caused by the collapse of the Russian Empire. The Armenian population of Agulis was almost completely slaughtered by Azerbaijanis and Turkish militia. Among the pogromists were Muslim refugees from Zangezur, where ethnic cleansing of Azerbaijanis by Armenians was carried out. The mother of the Azerbaijani writer Akram Aylisli witnessed the massacre of Armenians. According to the latter, his mother's stories about the atrocities greatly influenced the writer's work. About a hundred Armenian refugees escaped to Persia. Their descendants live in Iran, Russia, the USA, Armenia and other countries.

During the Soviet era, the territories of the Nakhichevan district, including Agulis, became part of the Azerbaijan SSR. The Zok dialect was preserved only in some villages around Agulis, where Armenians continued to live. But they were also forced to leave their homes in the late 1980s during the Karabakh conflict caused by the weakening of central power in the USSR. As a result, the Zoks were absorbed into the pan-Armenian nation and other peoples, and their dialect practically disappeared. Video recordings of conversations in the Zok dialect, prepared by the British linguist Catherine Hodgson, can be found on the Internet.

At the same time, up until 1986, one Armenian family lived in Aylis itself, from which the famous Yerevan artist and ethnographer Lusik Aguletsi came.

In Soviet times, the Monastery of the Holy Apostle Thomas (13th-14th centuries) with all its historical and architectural structures was included in the list of monuments of all-Union significance. In the post-Soviet decades, on a new wave of hostility between Azerbaijanis and Armenians accompanied by mutual destruction of monuments, all the Armenian temple complexes of Agulis were destroyed, as were the local Armenian cemeteries. A similar fate befell the huge ancient Armenian cemetery of khachkars, located nearby - near the modern Azerbaijani city of Julfa (ancient Armenian name - Jugha).

A map created by the USSR General Staff in 1977 marks several burial grounds and numerous ruins, although pinpointing medieval cemeteries poses significant difficulties. In Agulis, for instance, there were around 2,000 historical tombstones, and Aivazyan had photographed and drawn many of them during the 1970s and 1980s.

The works of the Armenian historian A. A. Aivazyan are dedicated to the study of the history and culture of Agulis.

== See also ==
- Agulis massacre
- Zok language
- Zoks
- Saint Thomas Monastery of Agulis
- St. Tovma Monastery (Chalkhangala)
- Aşağı Əylis
  - St. Stepanos Church (Ashaghy Aylis)
  - St. Nshan Church (Ashaghy Aylis)
- Yuxarı Əylis
  - St. Shmavon Church (Yukhari Aylis)
  - St. Stepanos Church (Yukhari Aylis)
  - Mets Astvatsatsin Monastery (Yukhari Aylis)
  - St. Hakob-Hayrapet Church (Yukhari Aylis)
  - St. Hovhannes-Mkrtich Church (Yukhari Aylis)
- Nader Shah's decree to the merchants of Agulis
