= Aşağı Əylis =

Aşağı Əylis Ագուլիս Agulis
- Municipality
- Location within Azerbaijan
- Coordinates: 38°55′11″N 45°59′11″E
- Country: Azerbaijan
- Autonomous republic: Nakhchivan
- District: Ordubad

Population (2005)
  - Total: 1,007
- Time zone: UTC+4 (AZT)

Aşağı Əylis (also rendered as Ashaghy Aylis, Ashaga Aylis, Ashagy Aylis) or Agulis (Armenian: Ագուլիս) is a village and municipality in the Ordubad District of Nakhchivan, Azerbaijan. It is located in the near the Ordubad-Yuxarı Aylis highway, 3 km in the east from the district center, on the bank of the Aylis River. Its population is busy with gardening, farming, animal husbandry. There are secondary school, club and a medical center in the village. It has a population of 1007.

The village was an important settlement of the Vaspurakan province of the Kingdom of Armenia or the Vaspurakan Kingdom, and many Armenian merchants trading along the Silk Road were said to have Agulis as hometown. Some historical Armenian Apostolic Churches that were in the area include St. Stepanos Church, St. Tovma Monastery of Agulis, St. Kristapor Church, St. Shmavon Church, St. Hovhannes-Mkrtich Church, St. Hakob-Hayrapet Church, Mets Astvatsatsin Monastery, St. Nshan (Amarayin) Church, St. Stepanos (St. Yerrordutyun Church). However, the Armenian presence in Nakhchivan was steadily extinguished in the 20th century, and with it the religious and cultural testaments to the historical Armenian presence in Agulis.

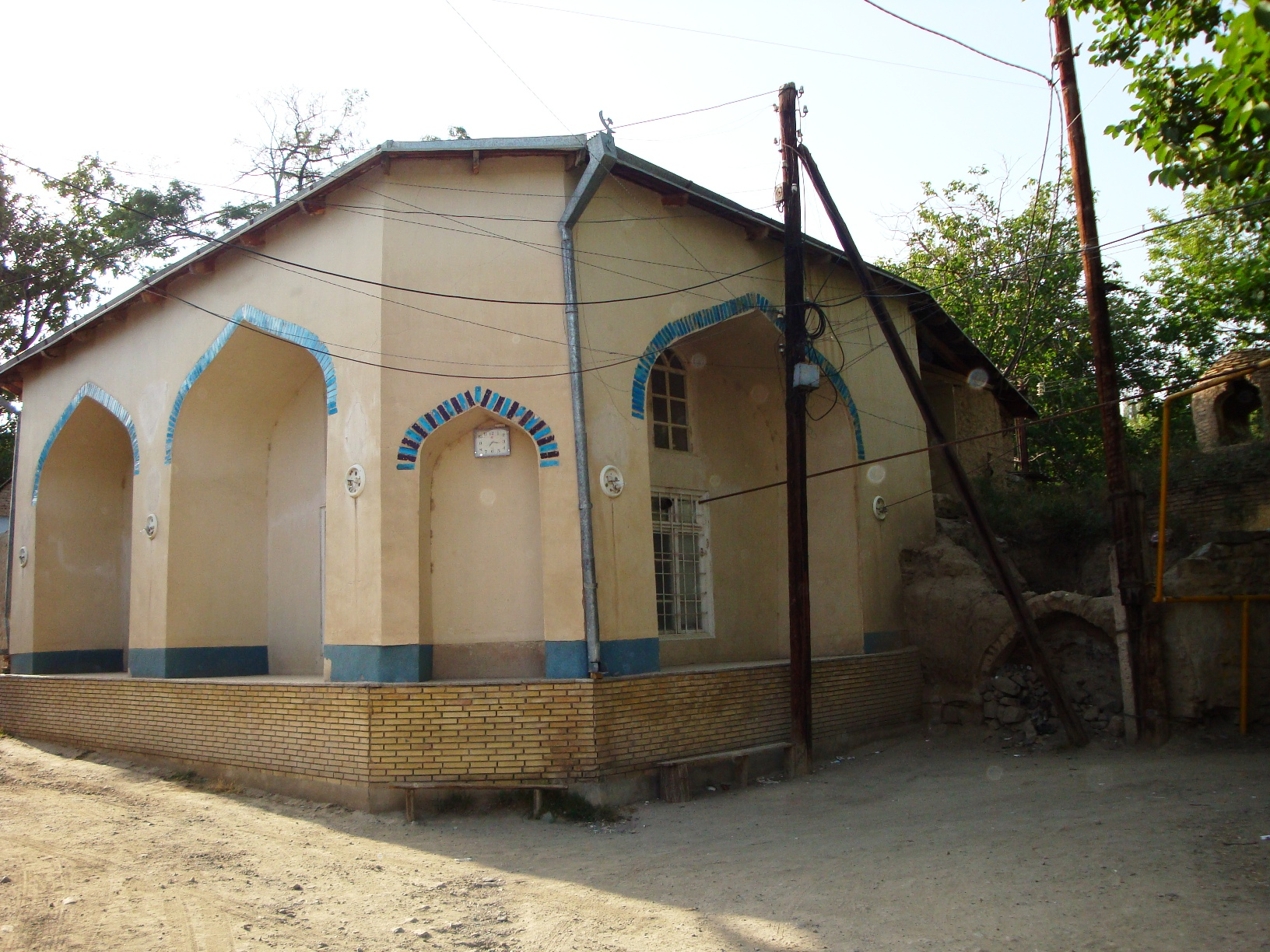
Mosque of the 18th century in the village

== Etymology ==
The settlement was first mentioned in historical sources in the 11th century under the Armenian name Agulik (Armenian: Ագուլիք).

Several ideas have been put forward about the later Azerbaijani name of Əylis. The city cemetery of the Ordubad known as the holy cemetery, is called "Malik Ibrahim cemetery". Malik Ibrahim's grave is inside this sanctuary, who had died in 1419. Thus, the village which was given him as award for his bravery, was named Əl-Leys, where Əl-Leys means brave or fearless in Arabic.

== See also ==
- Agulis (historical)
- Agulis massacre
- Akram Aylisli
- Saint Thomas Monastery of Agulis
- St. Stepanos Church (Ashaghy Aylis)
- St. Nshan Church (Ashaghy Aylis)
- Yuxarı Əylis
  - St. Shmavon Church (Yukhari Aylis)
  - St. Stepanos Church (Yukhari Aylis)
  - Mets Astvatsatsin Monastery (Yukhari Aylis)
  - St. Hakob-Hayrapet Church (Yukhari Aylis)
  - St. Hovhannes-Mkrtich Church (Yukhari Aylis)
