= Əylis =

Əylis or Aylis or Akulisy or Akulis may refer to:

- Aşağı Əylis (Nerkin Agulis, Lower Agulis), Azerbaijan
- Yuxarı Əylis (Verin Agulis, Upper Agulis), Azerbaijan
- Agulis (historical)
