= St. Hovhannes-Mkrtich Church (Yukhari Aylis) =

Armenian Apostolic Church in Nakhchivan, Azerbaijan

- Սուրբ Հովհաննես Մկրտիչ եկեղեցի
- St. Hovhannes-Mkrtich Church
- Location: Yukhari Aylis
- Country: Azerbaijan
- Denomination: Armenian Apostolic Church

Architecture
- Demolished: 1997–2000

St. Hovhannes-Mkrtich Church was an Armenian Apostolic Church located in the lower district of Yukhari Aylis village of the Nakhchivan Autonomous Republic of Azerbaijan. It was located approximately 400-500m southwest of St. Shmavon Church of the same village.

== History ==
The church was renovated in 1663, according to literary sources and an Armenian inscription on the base of the cupola of the church. The church was in a partially ruined condition in the late Soviet period.

== Architectural characteristics ==
It had a polygonal apse and two-storied vestries on either side, an eight-windowed dome rested atop four octagonal pillars. There were Armenian inscriptions on the perimeter of the dome. The frescoes on the church, added in 1686, were largely decayed. Some 150 tombstones existed along the northern and eastern sides of the church, within the perimeter wall. Since the 1940s, the tombstones were gradually disturbed and broken.

== Destruction ==
The church was still a standing monument in the 1980s, however it has been already destroyed by February 2000, according to the Caucasus Heritage Watch.

== See also ==
- St. Kristapor Church (Yukhari Aylis)
- St. Stepanos Church (Yukhari Aylis)
- Saint Thomas Monastery of Agulis
- St. Shmavon Church (Yukhari Aylis)
