= St. Kristapor Church (Yukhari Aylis) =

Church located in Yukhari Aylis, Azerbaijan

- Սուրբ Քրիստափոր եկեղեցի
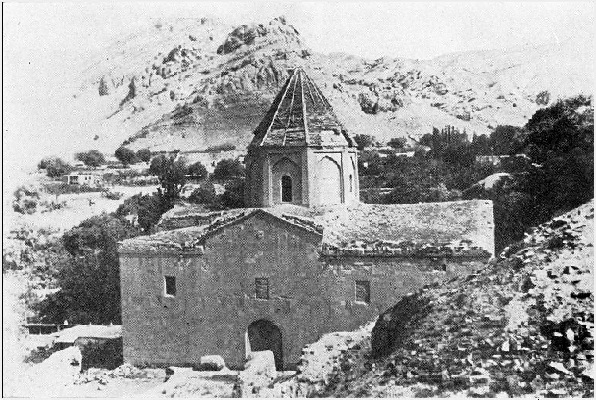
- St. Kristapor Church
- Location: Yukhari Aylis
- Country: Azerbaijan
- Denomination: Armenian Apostolic Church

History
- Status: Destroyed

Architecture
- Style: Domed basilica

St. Kristapor Church was an Armenian Apostolic Church located on the slope of Gindar hill in the central district of Yukhari Aylis village of the Nakhchivan Autonomous Republic of Azerbaijan.

== History ==
The earliest mention of St. Kristapor Church in the manuscripts dates to the 15th century. According to the Armenian inscriptions in the church, it was rebuilt between 1671 and 1675.

== Architectural characteristics ==
The church had a four-aisled dome-bearing basilica composition. It consisted of a senior shrine, a pair of storage rooms and a prayer hall with a bright and high interior, on the four massive facades of which the dome was erected. It had three arched and decorated entrances on the western, northern and southern facades.

== Destruction ==
The church was still a standing monument in the 1980s. It was completely demolished by February 3, 2000, according to the Caucasus Heritage Watch.

== See also ==
St. Stepanos Church (Yukhari Aylis)

Saint Thomas Monastery of Agulis

St. Shmavon Church (Yukhari Aylis)

St. Hakob-Hayrapet Church (Yukhari Aylis)
