= Nader Shah's decree to the merchants of Agulis =

Persian decree

Matenadaran, folder 1g, doc. 1288
- Matenadaran, Armenia
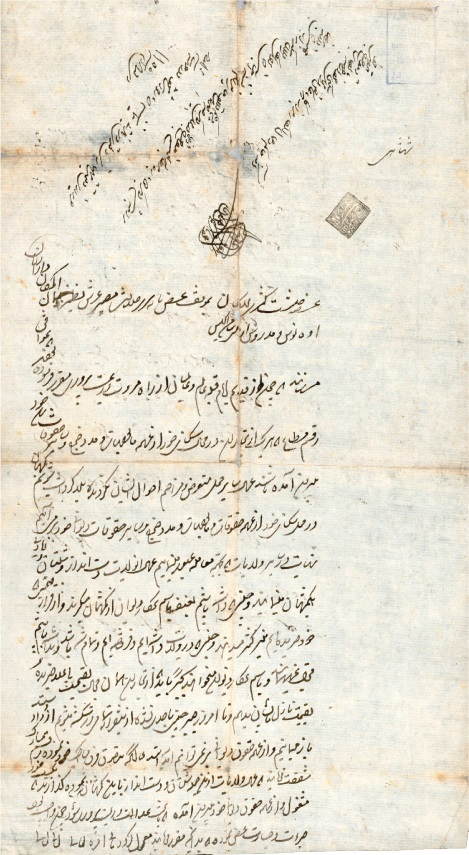
- Type: Farman
- Date: December 1742 – January 1743
- Place of origin: Afsharid Iran
- Language: Persian
- Patron: Nader Shah
- Script: Shekasteh Nastaliq
- Discovered: 2014 by Kristine Kostikyan and H. Gevorgyan

Nader Shah's decree to the merchants of Agulis (archival designation: Matenadaran, folder 1g, doc. 1288) is a Persian decree (farman) preserved in the Catholicosate Archive of the Matenadaran in Armenia. Written in Shekasteh Nastaliq script, the decree was issued by the Iranian ruler Nader Shah (r. 1736–1747) in late 1742 or early 1743 after merchants from Agulis petitioned Nader Shah about tax demands and abuses by state officials. The petitioners included the Armenian merchants Hovhannes and Martiros. The document contains information about taxation, trade and economic conditions under Nader Shah's rule.

== Background ==
Agulis was a center of trade and handicraft production in Nakhchivan during the seventeenth and eighteenth centuries. The settlement was associated with an established Armenian merchant class involved in regional and long-distance trade. After Nader Shah (r. 1736–1747) defeated the Ottomans in the mid-1730s, Nakhchivan became part of Afsharid Iran.

The financial demands created by Nader Shah's wars in Daghestan led the government to intensify tax collection in the early 1740s. Provincial authorities were ordered to increase tax collection and collect unpaid dues, including from groups that had earlier received exemptions. The modern historians Kostikyan and Margaryan write that merchants and other inhabitants faced heavier taxation, fines, and abuses by local authorities.

Reports of pressure on merchants appear in several contemporary sources. The Armenian historian Abraham Yerevantsi referred to the treatment of Christian merchants in Hamadan in 1730, while the Chronicle of the Carmelites discusses the difficulties experienced by Armenian merchants in New Julfa. According to Kostikyan and Margaryan, these conditions contributed to merchants leaving Iran, including from New Julfa (Isfahan's Armenian quarter) and parts of the South Caucasus.

== Hovhannes and Martiros ==
Hovhannes (Ovānis) and Martiros (Mardīrūs) were Armenian merchants from Agulis who left the town during the mid-eighteenth century and transferred property to the St. Tovmas Monastery. Documents connected to the family, including purchase deeds, survive in the monastery archive. The decree was issued after the two merchants petitioned Nader Shah. It forms part of a larger group of roughly one hundred Persian documents associated with them.

The two merchants were brothers and sons of Srapion (or Srafion). Family records from 1699 and 1725/6 refer to Srapion as a property holder and give him the titles ʿamdat al-tujjār ("head of the merchants") and ra'īs al-niṣārī ("chief of the Christians").

Both brothers held the title khvajeh, which was commonly associated with wealthy merchants. Sources cited by Kostikyan and Margaryan indicate that they traded through routes linking the Ottoman Empire and the eastern South Caucasus, including Aleppo, Bayazed, Ganja, Shaki, and Qabala.

The documents also describe Hovhannes as taking part in local tax administration in Agulis and nearby villages in Nakhchivan. The brothers owned land in several settlements and shared possession of a mill, a caravanserai, and a calico workshop that was rented out.

Kostikyan and Margaryan describe the decree as part of a broader pattern of petitions submitted by Armenian merchants concerning taxation and abuses by officials. They note similarities between this decree and earlier requests made by merchants from New Julfa.

== Historical significance ==
According to Kostikyan and Margaryan, the decree sheds light on the economic policies under Nader Shah's rule and the tactics employed to extract money and impose additional taxes on merchants. Although Nader Shah's orders were intended to address these issues, they ultimately did not alleviate the merchants' plight. The persistent pressure on the administration to maximize revenue from all subjects undermined the effectiveness of these decrees, resulting in disorder and violence from Nader Shah's officials. This environment of exploitation and instability led to significant despair among merchants, prompting many to leave Iran.

== Sources ==
- Aslanian, Sebouh (2011). From the Indian Ocean to the Mediterranean: The Global Trade Networks of Armenian Merchants from New Julfa. University of California Press. ISBN 978-0520947573.
- Kostikyan, Kristine; Margaryan, Gor (2024). "Nādir Šāh's Decree Issued at the Request of the Armenian Merchants of Agulis". Iran and the Caucasus. 28 (2): 166–178. doi:10.1163/1573384X-02802004.
