= Agulis massacre =

1919 massacre of Armenians

- Part of Muslim uprisings in Kars and Sharur–Nakhichevan
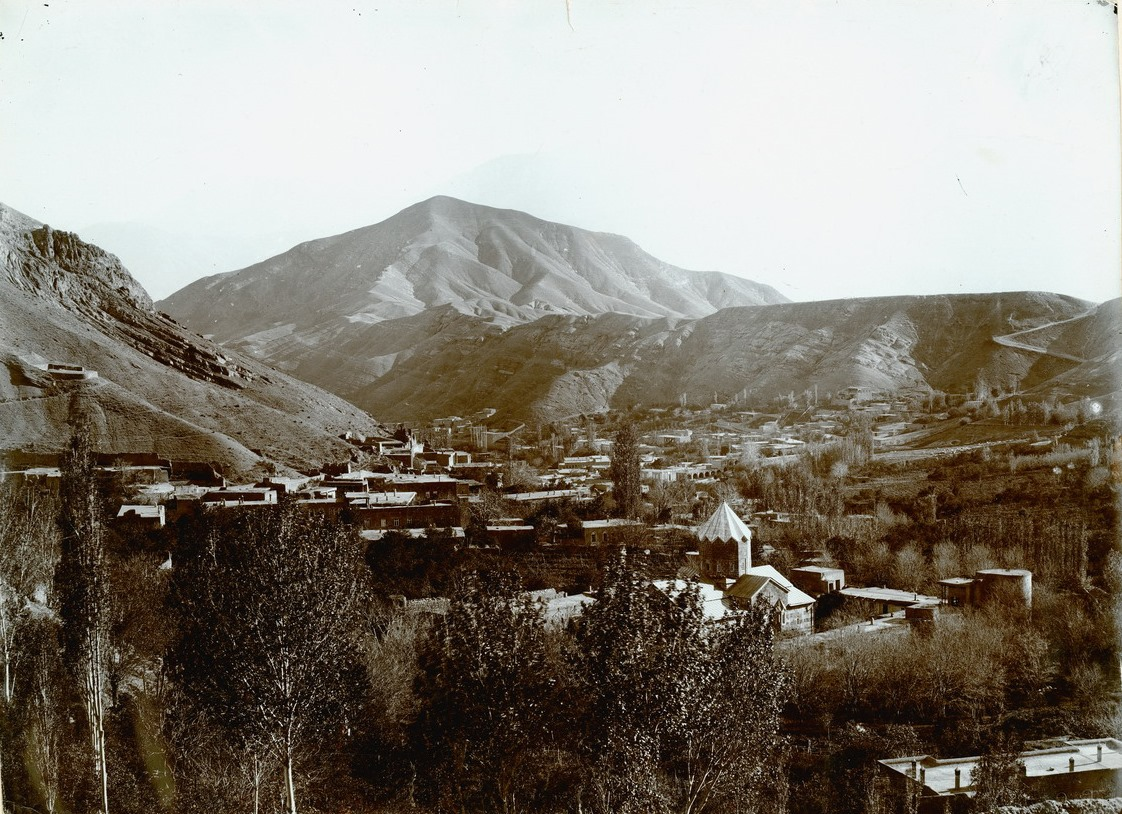
- Town panorama in early 1900s
- Location: 38°57′10″N 45°58′53″E; Yuxarı Əylis, Nakhchivan, Azerbaijan
- Date: December 24–25, 1919
- Target: Armenian civilians
- Attack type: Massacre
- Deaths: 1,400
- Perpetrators: Azerbaijani authorities and locals and refugees from Zangezur
- Motive: Anti-Armenianism

The Agulis massacre (Armenian: Ագուլիսի ջարդեր) was a massacre of the Armenian population of Agulis (modern-day Yuxarı Əylis) by Azerbaijani state authorities and Azeri locals from Ordubad and refugees from Zangezur as part of the Muslim uprisings in Kars and Sharur–Nakhichevan against the First Republic of Armenia. The attack, lasting from December 24 to December 25, 1919, resulted in the destruction of the town of Agulis.

== Background ==
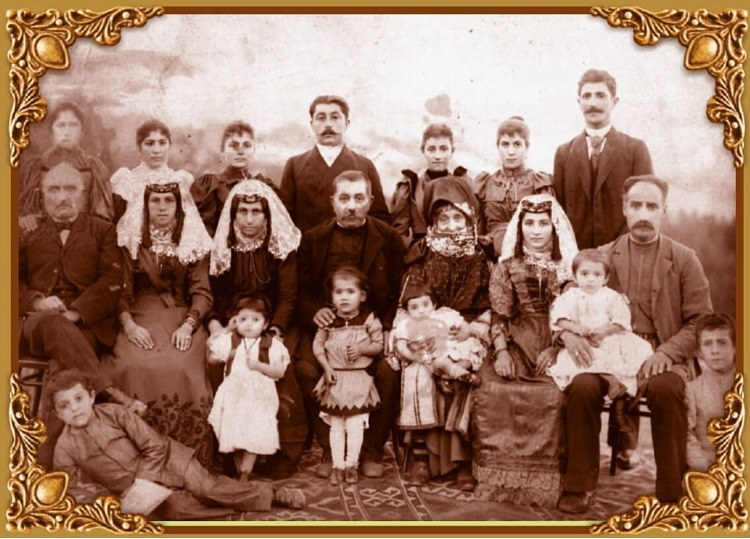
Armenian family from Agulis

Agulis was known from antiquity as an Armenian cultural center of trade and crafts being a part of the Vaspurakan province of the Kingdom of Armenia (antiquity). The merchants of Agulis had a cooperative relationship with their Muslim neighbors and played a key role in the Trans-Araxes trade of the Persian Khanates of the Caucasus. The Agulis district (mahal) during the period of Iranian Armenia was the only mahal of Nakhchivan to retain a majority Armenian population before the Russian conquest.

Following the independence of the Transcaucasian republics from the Russian Empire and the Transcaucasian Federation in 1918, the nationalist parties of Armenia and Azerbaijan fought over the borders of the two states. The principal areas involved in the border disputes were the mixed Armenian-Azerbaijani regions of Nakhchivan, Zangezur, and Nagorno-Karabakh. The result of these border disputes was ethnic cleansing on both sides in order to reduce the other sides claim to the land. This was done by Armenia in Zangezur and by Azerbaijan in Nakhchivan.

In the spring of 1919, the First Republic of Armenia extended administrative control over the region of Sharur-Nakhichevan, with Agulis being made the centre for the subregion of Goghtan. But in the summer of the year, a Muslim insurgency broke out against Armenian rule, and in August the region came under the control of Azerbaijan and the newly appointed commissar of Ordubad, Abbas Guli Bey Tairov. Tairov was assisted by Edif Bey, the commandant of Ordubad and an Ottoman commander who had stayed behind after the end of World War I following the Ottoman withdrawal of the region. Agulis pledged its loyalty to Tairov, although in the following months, its inhabitants faced a growing food crisis and were not allowed to leave the town. The plight of its inhabitants worsened when, in November of that year, the Azerbaijan Democratic Republic unsuccessfully attempted to wrestle the region of Zangezur from Armenian control.

Matters came to a head-on December 17, when frenzied Muslims who had been deported from Zangezur, made their way to Lower Agulis and began to attack its Armenian inhabitants, forcing them to retreat to the upper town. One of the main reasons for this was that Azerbaijani refugees from that district had suffered so intensely from exposure and famine due to the Armenian outrages in Zangezur, they had apparently lost control and sought relief in Lower Agulis. The Azerbaijanis eventually settled in the abandoned Armenian homes after the massacre.

== The massacre ==
On December 24, the frenzied Muslim mob, joined by the Azerbaijani refugees from Zangezur, entered Upper Agulis and started to pillage the town. They then proceeded to massacre its Armenian population, leaving Upper Agulis in smoldering ruins the next day. According to the Armenian government, up to 400 Armenians were killed in Lower Agulis and up to 1,000 in Upper Agulis.

== Aftermath ==
The town was partially rebuilt during the Soviet period. However, none of the Armenian cultural monuments were restored and the monuments that remained were completely destroyed by Azerbaijan, which was labelled as an act of cultural genocide by several authors. A prime example of this was the destruction of the Saint Thomas Monastery of Agulis which still remained standing in the late 1980s per the field research of Argam Aivazian but, was subsequently bulldozed and a mosque was built over it.

== Stone Dreams ==
The massacre of Agulis, the hometown of Azerbaijani writer Akram Aylisli, was one of the primary settings of his controversial novel Stone Dreams. The book was widely welcomed in Armenia. However, in Azerbaijan the book was met with public outcry, defiance, and smear campaigns initiated by Azerbaijani authorities.

== See also ==
- Muslim uprisings in Kars and Sharur–Nakhichevan
- List of massacres in Azerbaijan
- Armenians in Nakhchivan
- Anti-Armenian sentiment in Azerbaijan

== Bibliography ==
- Aivazian, Argam (1990). "Agulis". The Historical Monuments of Nakhichevan. Detroit: Wayne State University Press. pp. 14–24. ISBN 978-0814318966.
- Bournoutian, George (2015). "Demographic Changes in the Southwest Caucasus, 1604–1830: The Case of Historical Eastern Armenia" (PDF). Forum of EthnoGeoPolitics. 3 (2). Amsterdam: 27–35. ISSN 2352-3654.
- De Waal, Thomas (2003). Black Garden: Armenia and Azerbaijan Through Peace and War. New York: New York University Press. ISBN 978-0-8147-1945-9.
- Hovannisian, Richard G. (1982). "The Doom of Akulis". The Republic of Armenia, Vol. II: From Versailles to London, 1919-1920. Berkeley: University of California Press. pp. 207–238. ISBN 0-520-04186-0.
- Shakeri, Khosrow (1998). The Armenians of Iran; The Paradoxical Role of a Minority in a Dominant culture. Cambridge: Center for Middle Eastern Studies of Harvard University: Harvard University Press. ISBN 9780932885166.
- Vaux, Bert (2008). Zok: The Armenian dialect of Agulis. In between Paris and Fresno: Mazda Publishers. pp. 283–301. ISBN 9781568591681.
