= Lusik Aguletsi =

Armenian artist (born 1946)

- Լուսիկ Ագուլեցի
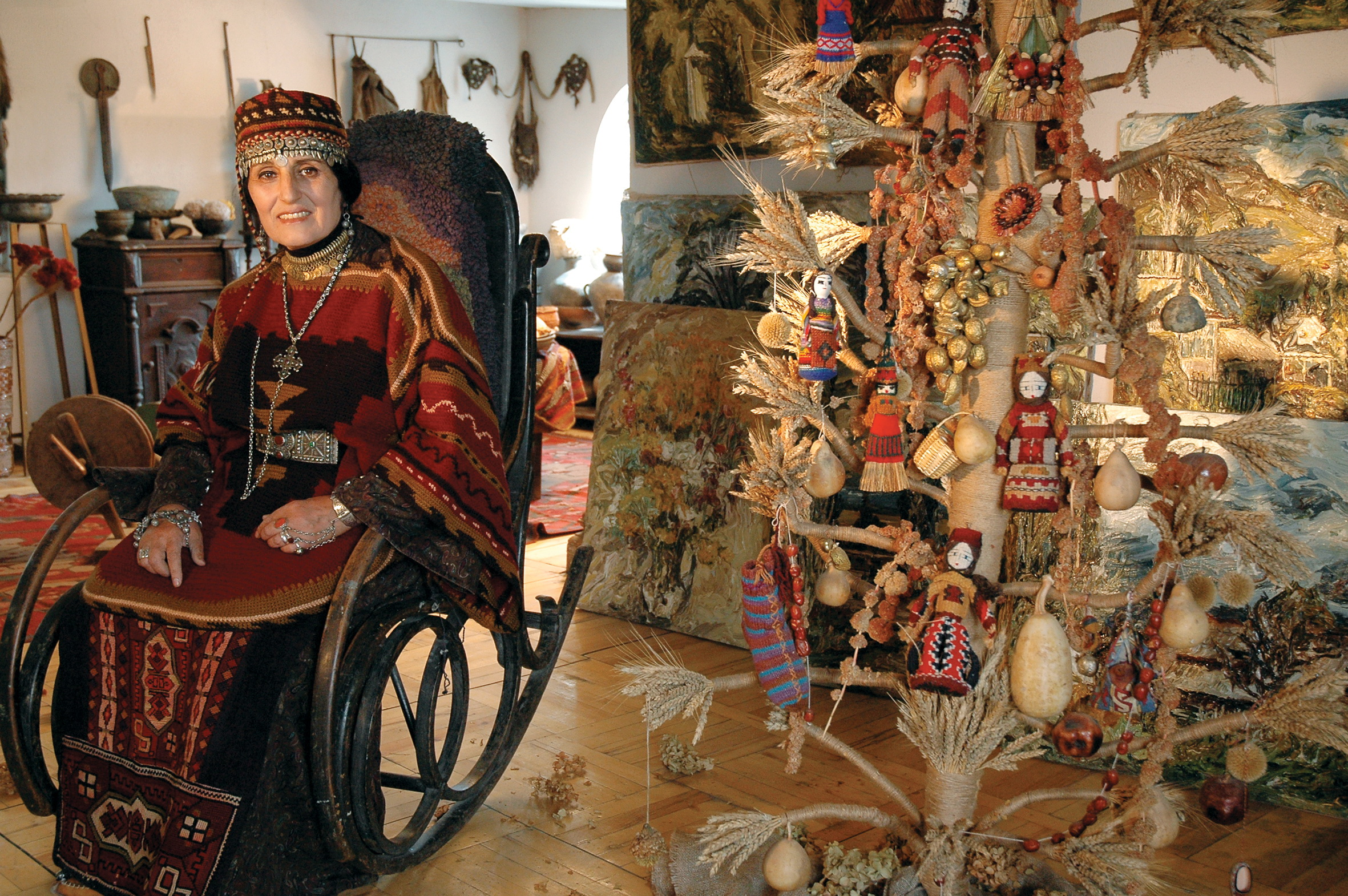
- Aguletsi in her traditional attire
- Born: Lusik Zhorik Harutyunyan; May 31, 1946; Verin Agulis, Nakhichevan ASSR, Azerbaijan SSR (now Nakhchivan, Azerbaijan)
- Died: July 13, 2018 (72 years old); Yerevan, Armenia
- Education: Panos Terlemezyan Art College (1967)
- Spouse: Yuri Samvelyan
- Awards: Honored Artist of Armenia; Movses Khorenatsi medal

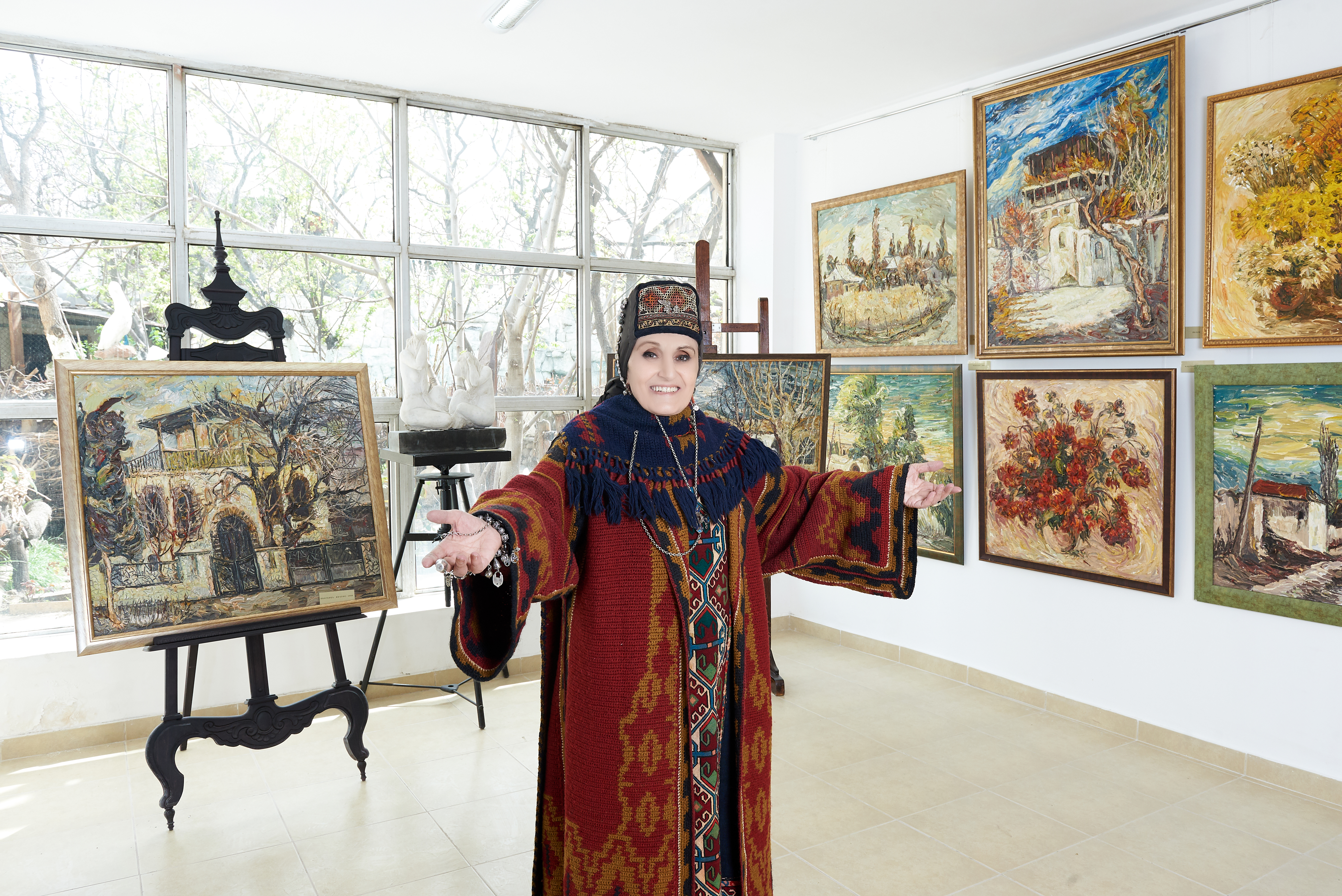

Lusik Aguletsi (Armenian: Լուսիկ Ագուլեցի; born Lusik Zhorzhiki Harutyunyan May 31, 1946 - July 13, 2018) was a Nakhichevan-born Armenian painter, ethnographer, and Honored Artist of Armenia. She was a prominent figure who dedicated her life to preserving and promoting Armenian heritage, particularly folk art.

== Life and education ==
Aguletsi was born on May 31, 1946, in the village of Verin Agulis in Nakhichevan, to the Harutyunyan family. They were one of the last Armenians living in Agulis after the 1919 Agulis massacre committed by the Azerbaijanis.

In 1953, Aguletsi's family moved to Yerevan. From 1963 till 1967, she studied at the Panos Terlemezyan Art College and received a special prize from the Avangard newspaper. She became a member of the Artists' Union of Armenia in 1974.

Lusik Aguletsi died on July 13, 2018, at the age of 72.

== Awards and prizes ==
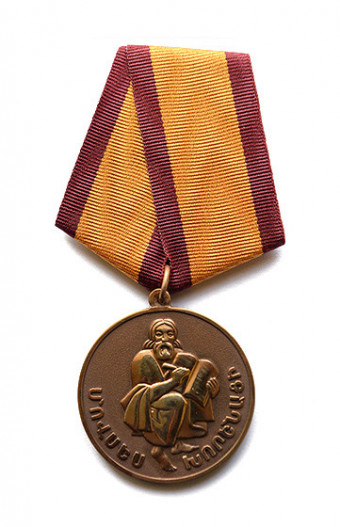
Movses Khorenatsi Medal

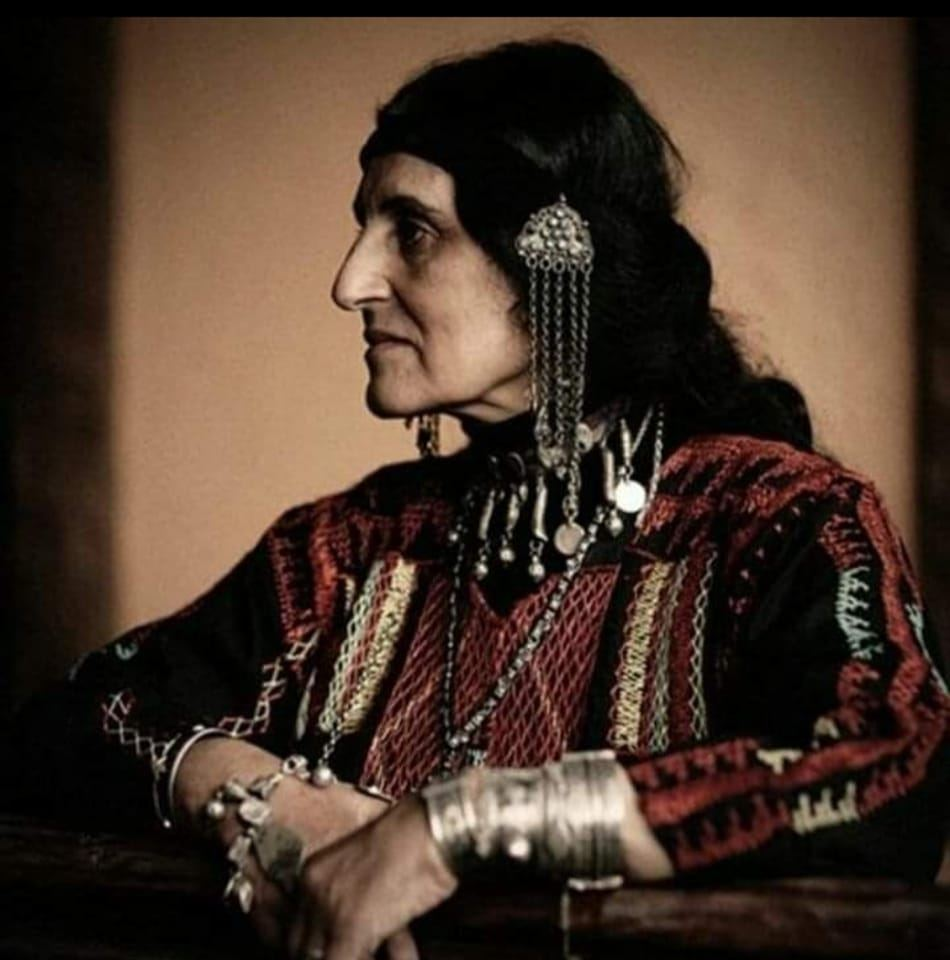
Lusik Aguletsi in Armenian traditional attire and jewelry

- Honored Artist of Armenia
- Gold medal of Yerevan City Hall
- Movses Khorenatsi medal

== Legacy ==
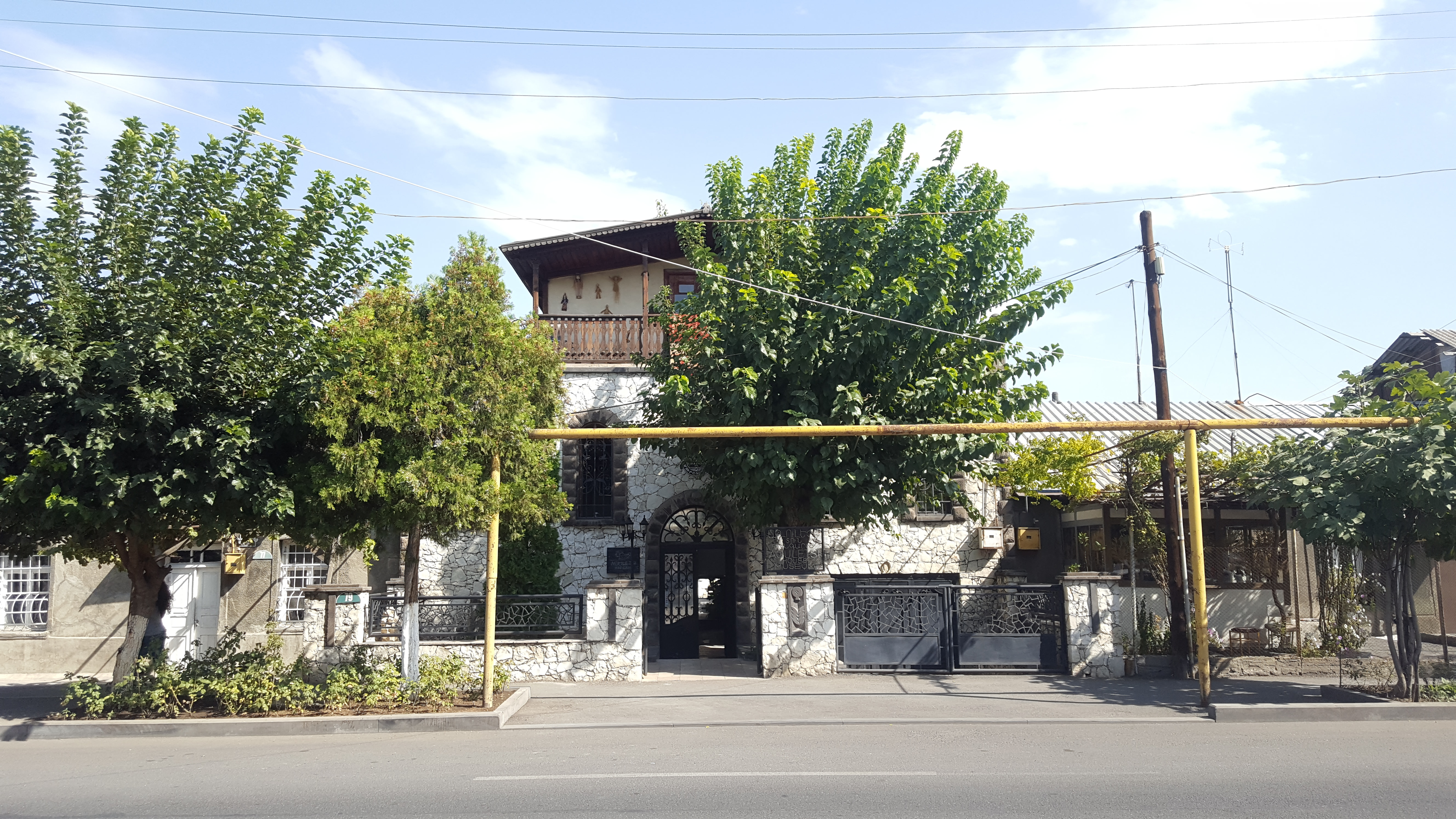
Lusik Aguletsi House-Museum and Art Cafe

Aguletsi's house on Muratsan Street was converted into a home muesuem.

== Works ==
- Lusik Aguletsi, Relics of the Past collection, Yerevan, (2010)

== Gallery ==
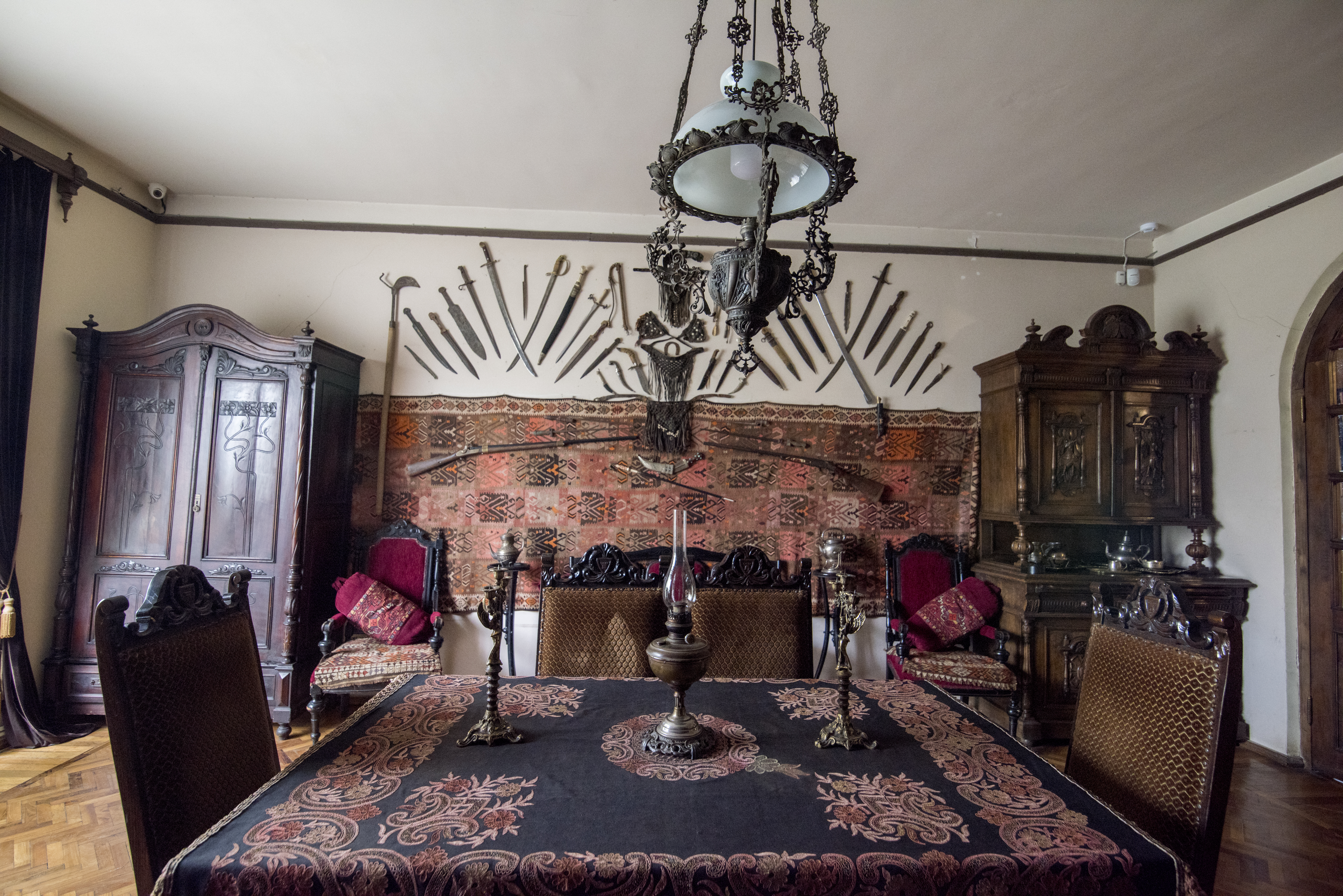

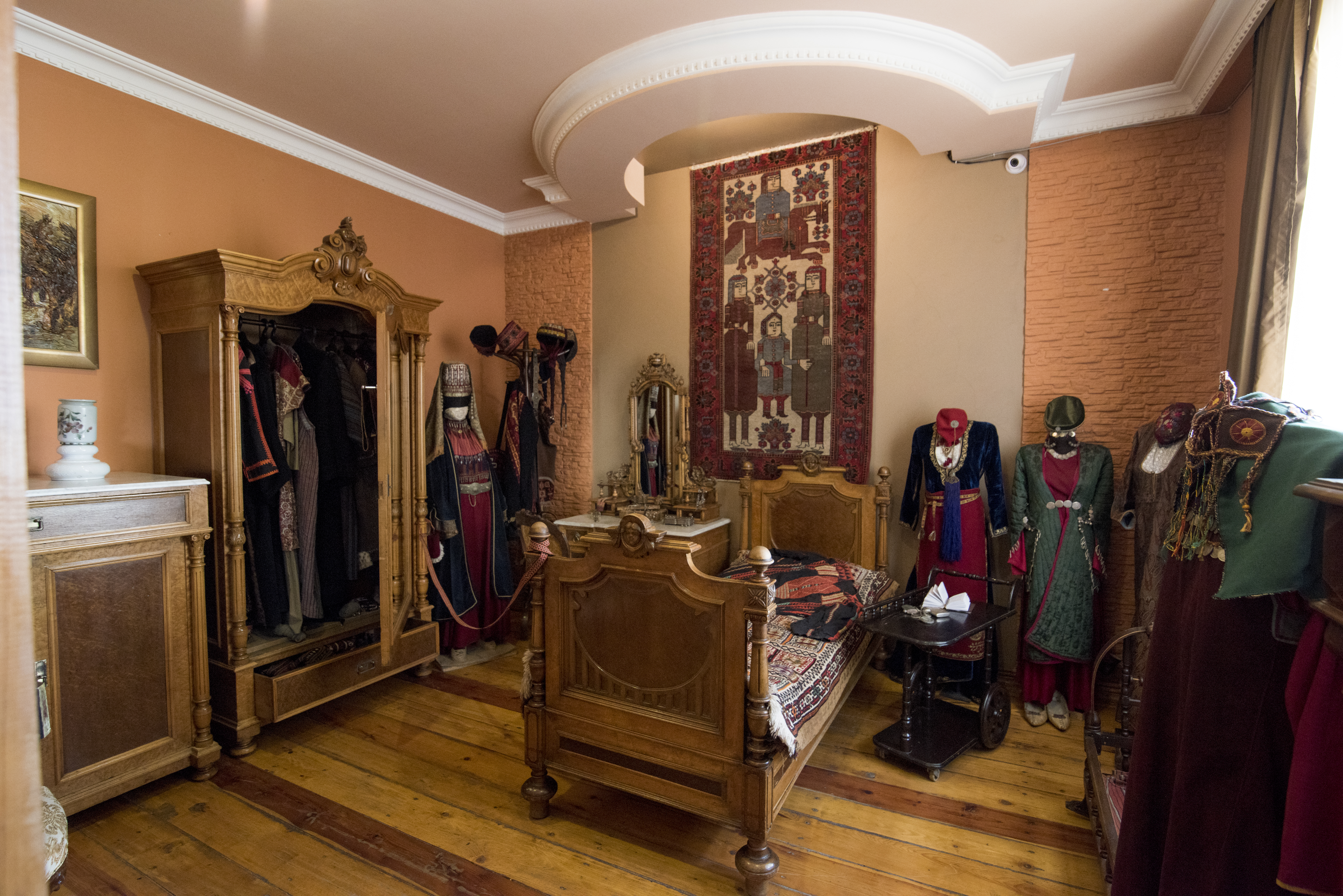

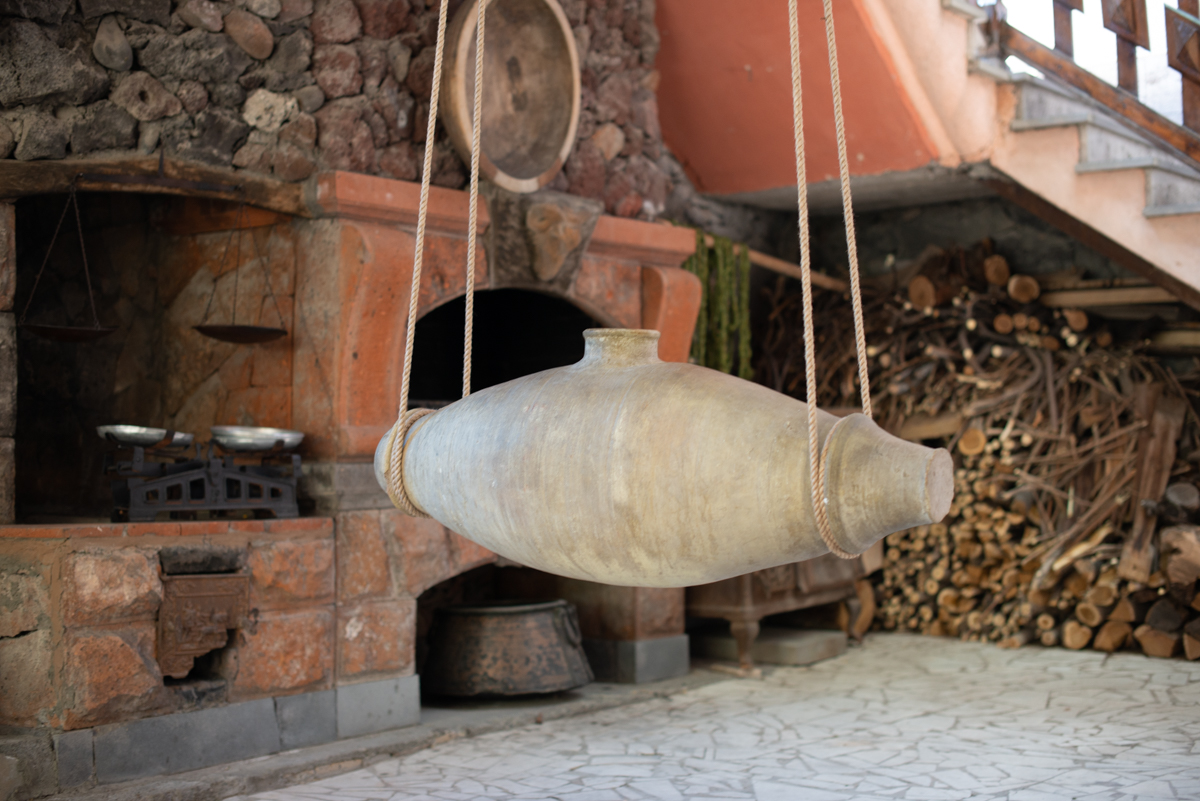

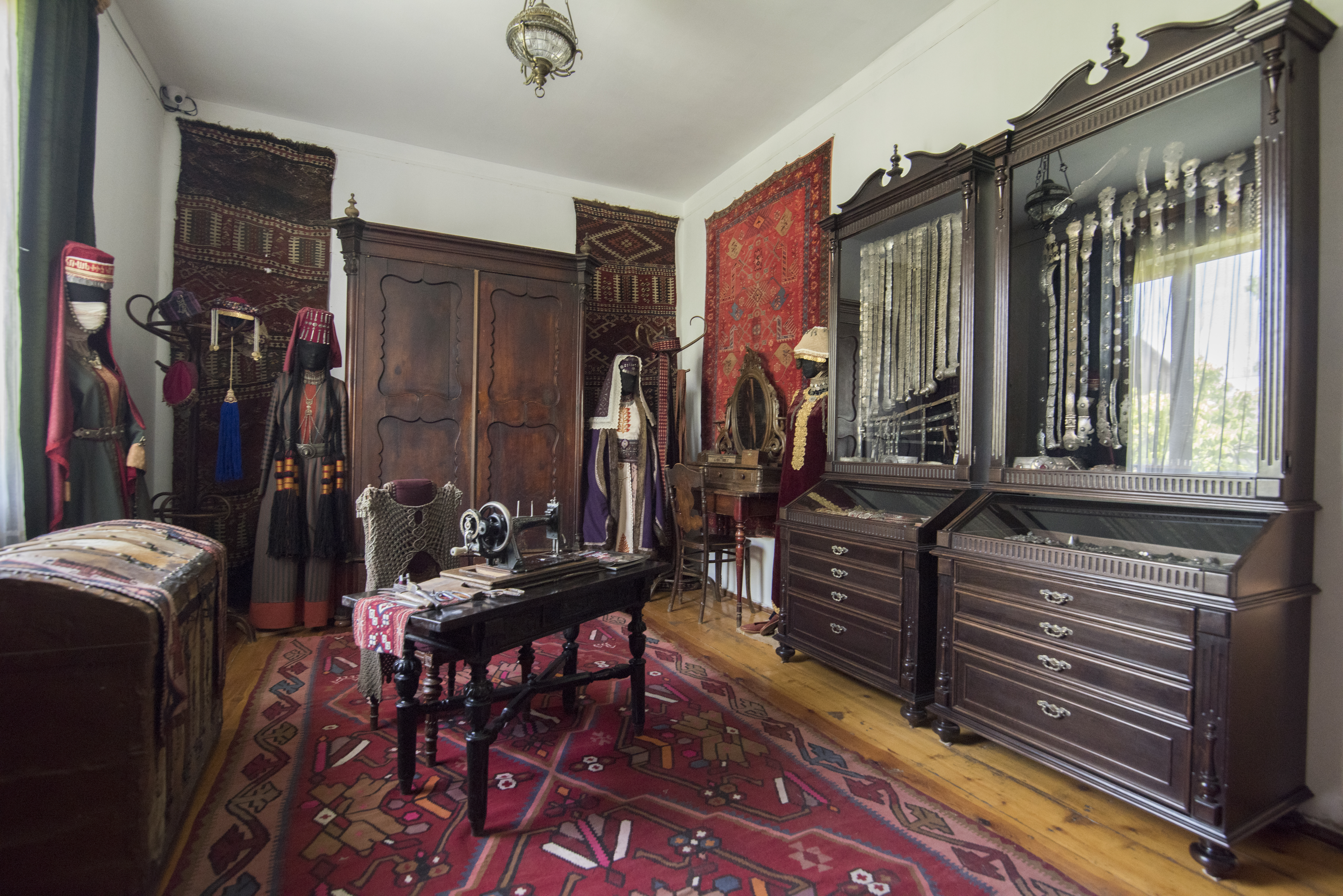

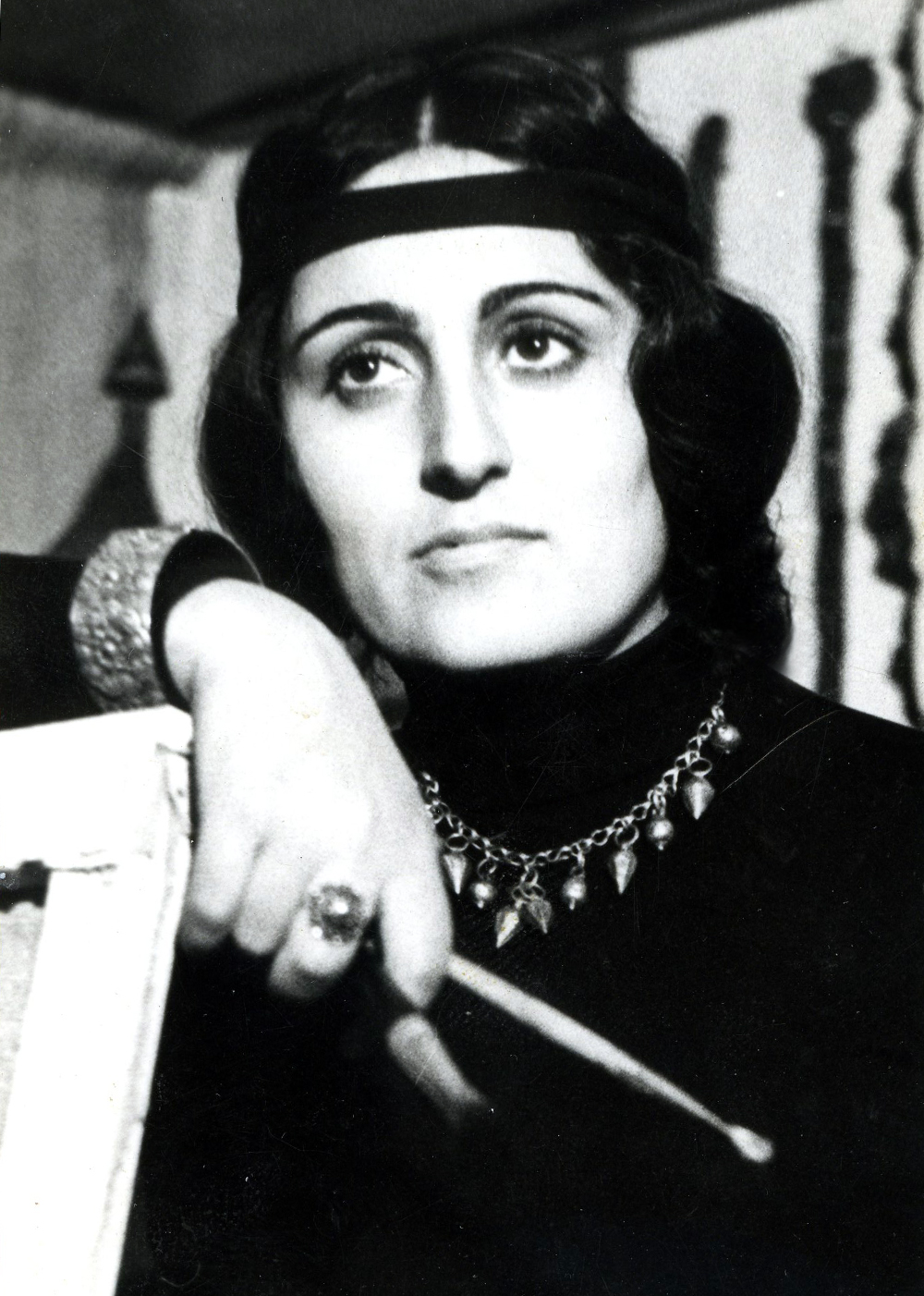

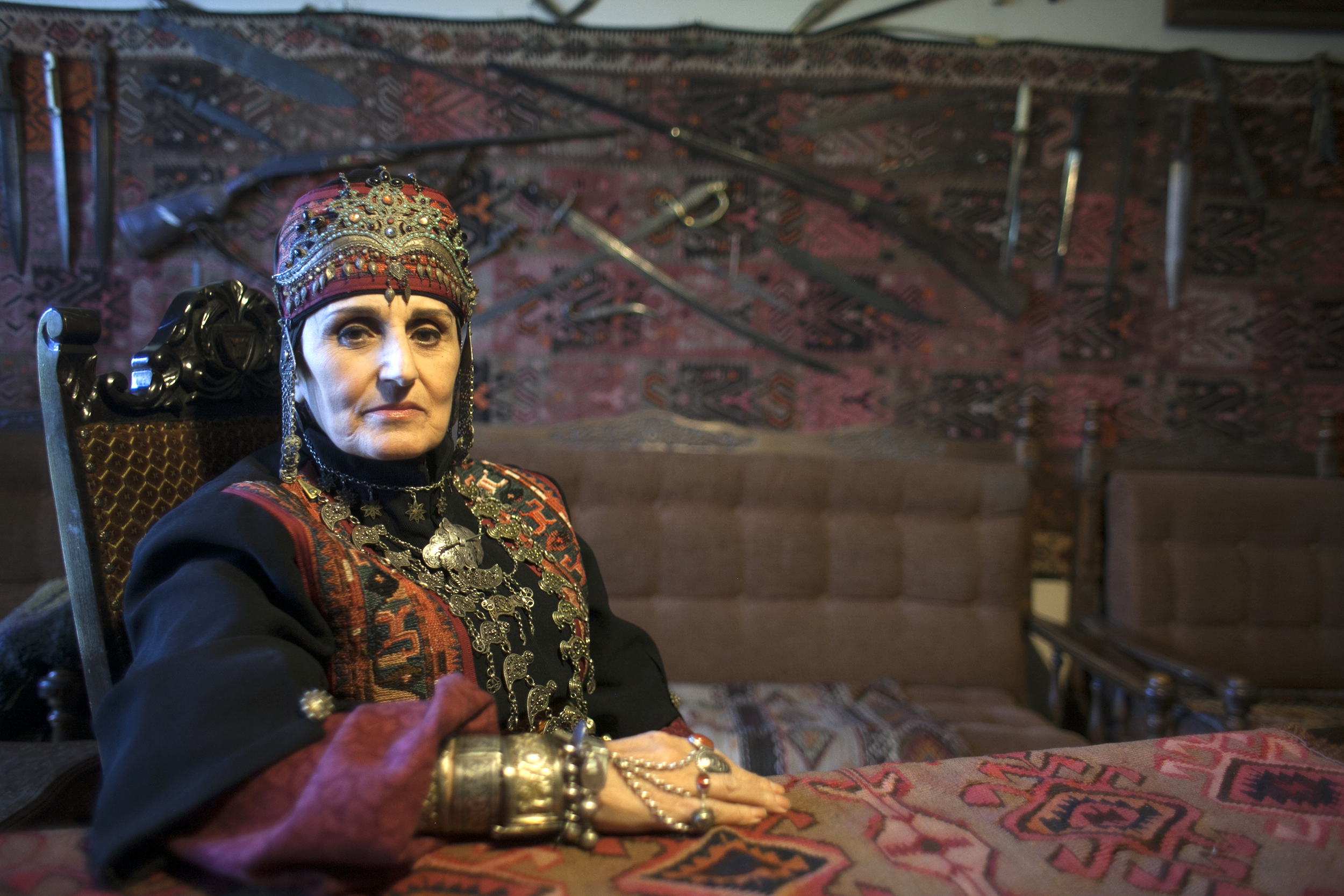

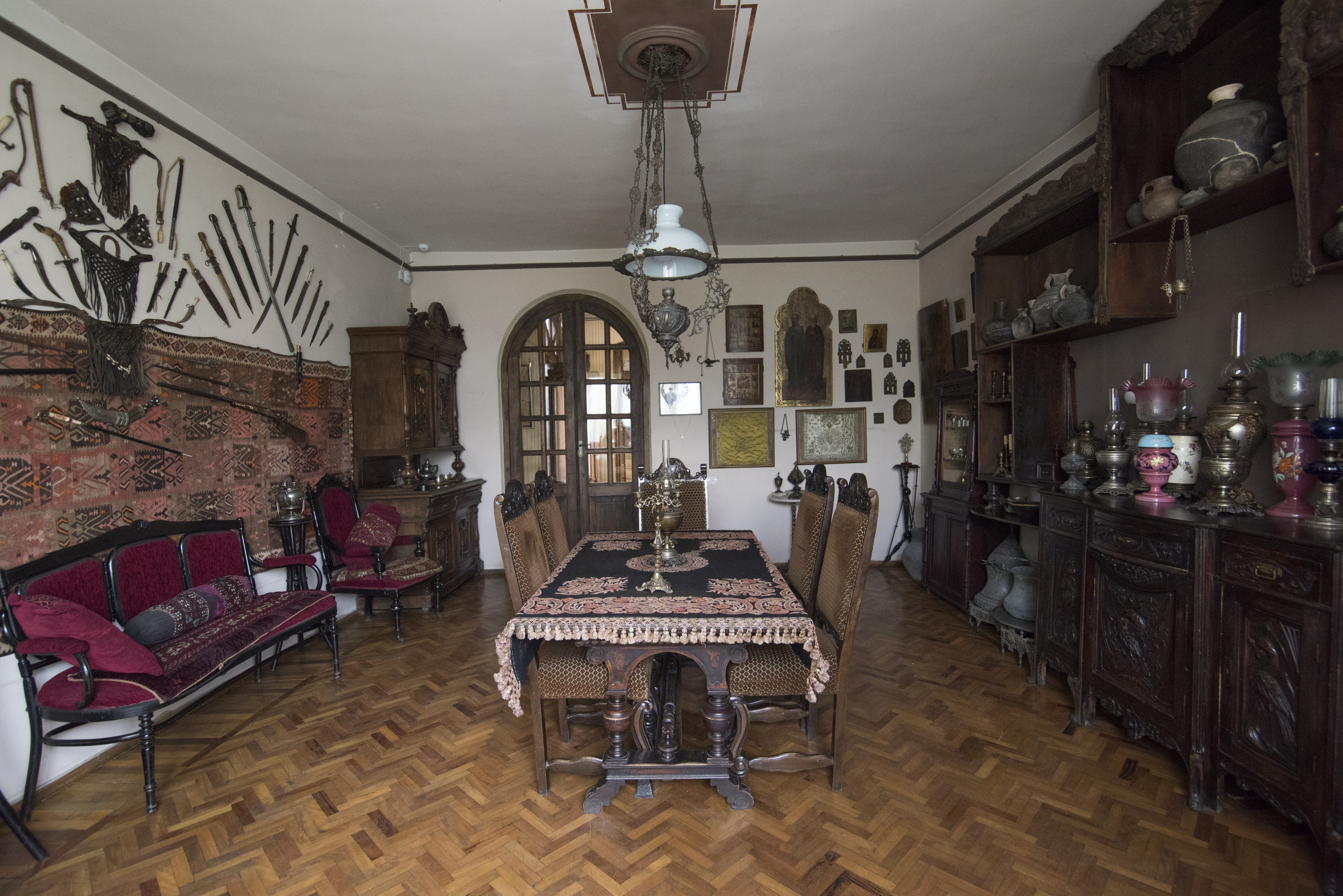

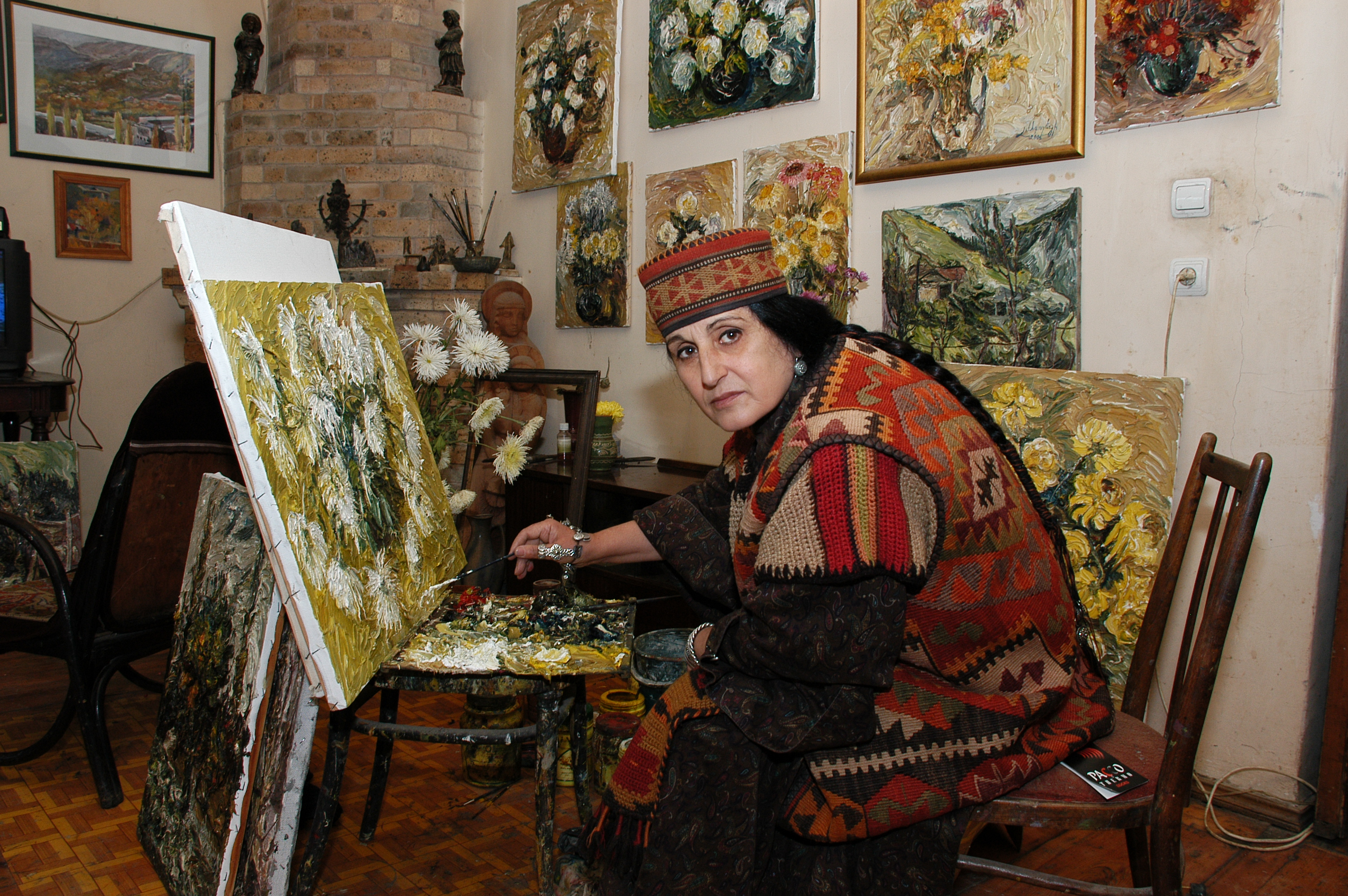

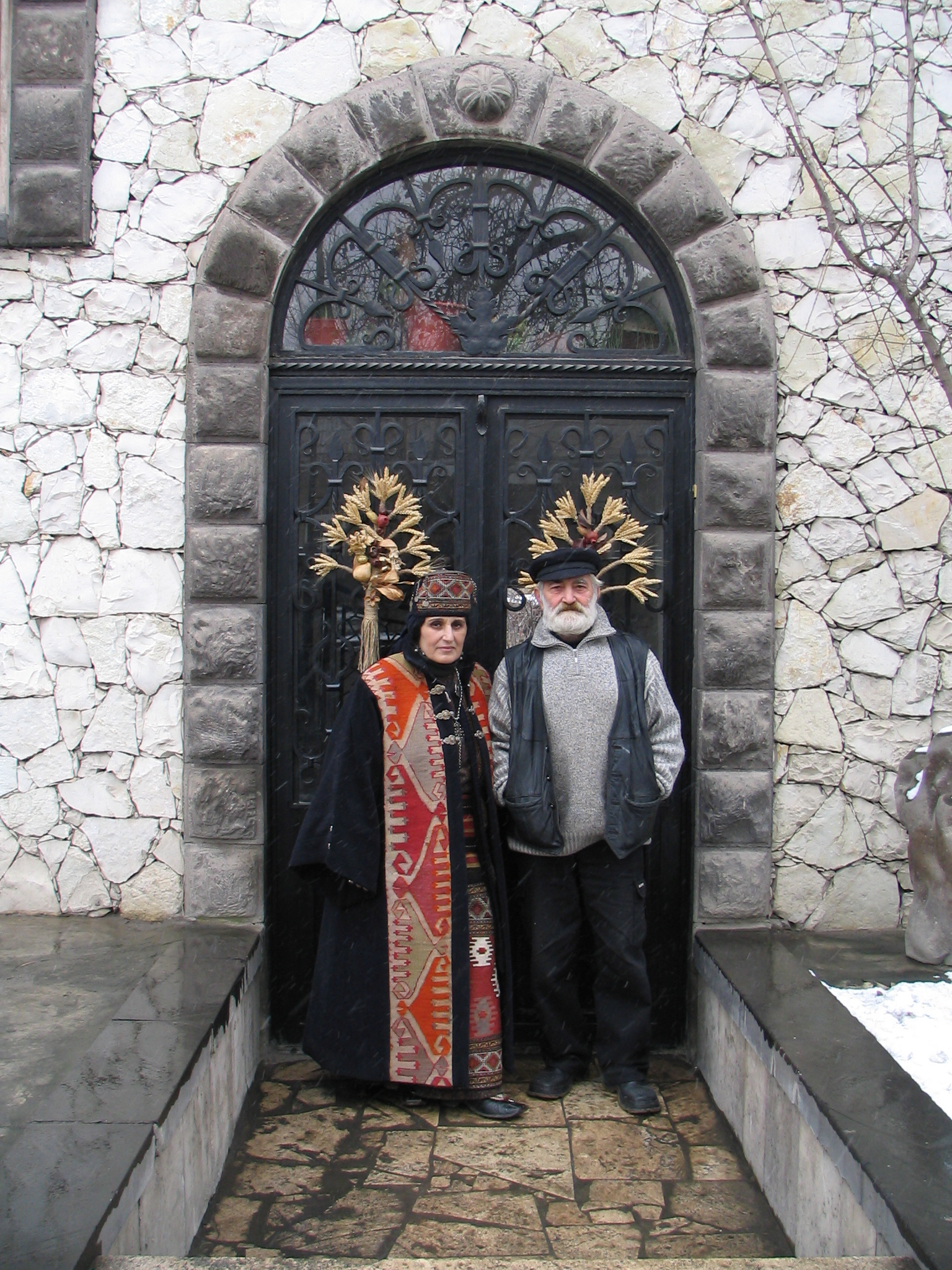

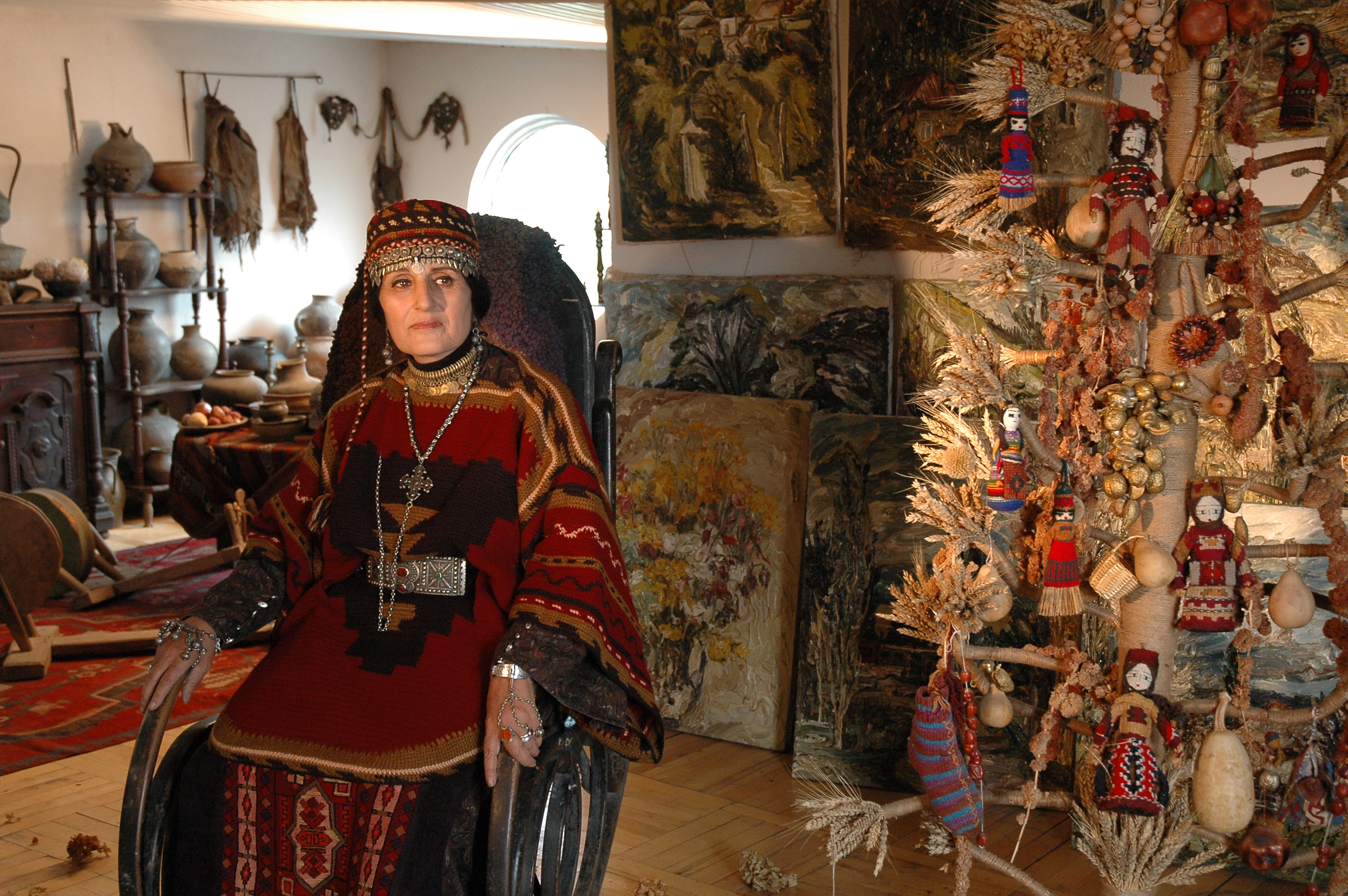

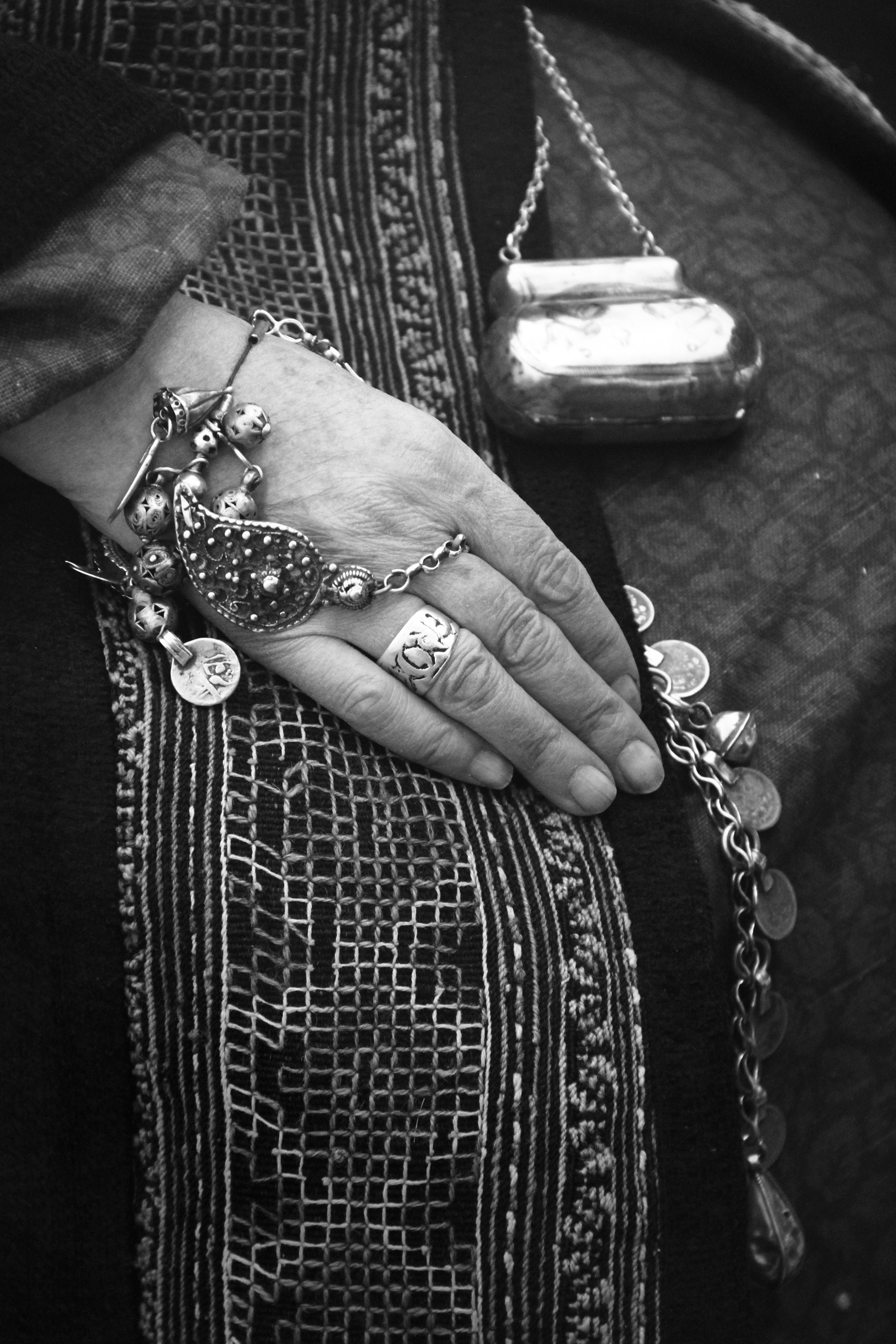
