= St. Hakob-Hayrapet Church (Yukhari Aylis) =

Armenian Apostolic Church in Yuxarı Əylis, Nakhchivan, Azerbaijan

- Սուրբ Հակոբ-Հայրապետ եկեղեցի
- St. Hakob-Hayrapet Church
- Location: Yukhari Aylis
- Country: Azerbaijan
- Denomination: Armenian Apostolic Church

Architecture
- Years built: 11–12th centuries
- Demolished: 1997–2000

St. Hakob-Hayrapet was an Armenian Apostolic Church located in the lower district of Yukhari Aylis village of the Nakhchivan Autonomous Republic of Azerbaijan. It was still a standing monument in the 1980s and had been already destroyed by 2000. It was located approximately 240 m northeast of St. Hovhannes-Mkrtich Church of the same village.

== History ==
The church was founded in the 11th or 12th century and renovated in the 17th century. According to an Armenian inscription on the perimeter of the cupola, the church was renovated again within a six-month period in 1901.

== Design and architectural characteristics ==
In terms of its style, the church was a single-chamber nave with a domed hall and had a two-storied rectangular apse. There were Armenian inscriptions at the bottom of the dome and in the western facade.

== Destruction ==
St. Hakob-Hayrapet was a standing and well-preserved monument in the 1980s, but was destroyed by February 3, 2000, according to the Caucasus Heritage Watch.

== See also ==
- St. Kristapor Church (Yukhari Aylis)
- St. Stepanos Church (Yukhari Aylis)
- Saint Thomas Monastery of Agulis
- St. Shmavon Church (Yukhari Aylis)
