= St. Stepanos Church (Ashaghy Aylis) =

St. Stepanos or St. Yerrordutyun Church
- Սուրբ Ստեփանոս (Երրորդություն) եկեղեցի
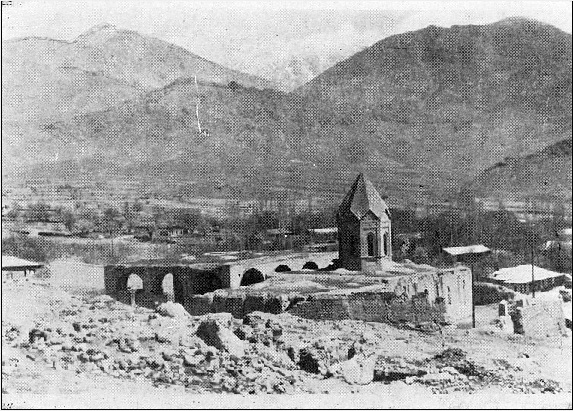
- St. Stepanos or St. Yerrordutyun Church
- Location: Ashaghy Aylis
- Country: Azerbaijan
- Denomination: Armenian Apostolic Church

History
- Founded: 12/13th century

Architecture
- Style: domed basilica
- Demolished: 1997-2000

St. Stepanos or St. Yerordutyun Church was an Armenian church located in the northwestern part of the Ashagy Aylis village (Ordubad district) of the Nakhchivan Autonomous Republic of Azerbaijan. It was located next to St. Nshan Church. It was still a standing monument in the 1980s and was completely erased by 2000.

== History ==
The church was founded in the 12th or 13th century, it was renovated in the 17th century as well as in the 19th century, according to Armenian inscriptions found in the church.

== Architectural characteristics ==
The church was a domed basilica; a cupola with eight-sided drum rested atop the flat roof, the plan included a five-sided apse on the exterior and a porch at the west end. The interior walls bore Armenian inscriptions and fragments of frescoes.

== Destruction ==
St. Stepanos Church was still a standing monument in the late Soviet period (the 1980s). The church along with the adjacent St. Nshan Church was already completely erased by February 2000, as the investigation of the Caucasus Heritage Watch shows.

== See also ==
- St. Nshan Church (Ashaghy Aylis)
