= St. Nshan Church (Ashaghy Aylis) =

St. Nshan or Amarayin Church
- Ամառային (Սուրբ Նշան) եկեղեցի
- St. Nshan or Amarayin Church
- Location: Aşağı Əylis
- Country: Azerbaijan
- Denomination: Armenian Apostolic Church

History
- Status: Destroyed
- Founded: 9th Century

Architecture
- Style: Basilica
- Demolished: 1997-2000

St. Nshan or Amarayin Church was an Armenian church located in the northwestern part of the Ashagy Aylis village (Ordubad district) of the Nakhchivan Autonomous Republic of Azerbaijan. It was located next to St. Stepanos (St. Yerordutyun) Church. It was still a standing monument in the 1980s and was destroyed at some point between 1997 and 2000.

== History ==
The church was founded in the 9th century and was rebuilt in the 17th century. The church is mentioned in the colophon of a synaxarium with the date 1690.

== Architectural characteristics ==
The church was attached to the north facade of St. Yerordutyun Church. In its form the church was an open structure where liturgical services were performed in the summer months, that is why it was also called "Amarayin" (i.e. summer in Armenian) church. The basilica consisted of a nave, two aisles, and a seven-sided apse with two four-sided apses on either side. Arcades on the north, south, and west facades created an open architectural form.

== Destruction ==
The church was still a standing monument in the late Soviet period (the 1980s). The church along with the adjacent St. Stepanos Church was already completely erased by 2000, as the investigation of the Caucasus Heritage Watch shows.

== See also ==
St. Stepanos Church (Ashaghy Aylis)
