= St. Stepanos Church (Yukhari Aylis) =

Armenian church in Yukhari Aylis, Nakhchivan, Azerbaijan

- Սուրբ Ստեփանոս եկեղեցի
- St. Stepanos Church
- Location: Yuxarı Əylis
- Country: Azerbaijan
- Denomination: Armenian Apostolic Church

Architecture
- Style: Domed basilica
- Years built: 12–13th centuries
- Demolished: 1997–2000

St. Stepanos Church was an Armenian church located on the slope of a hill in the northwestern Verin Get district of Yukhari Aylis village of the Nakhchivan Autonomous Republic of Azerbaijan.

== History ==
The church was most probably built in the 12th or 13th century and was rebuilt in the 17th century and in 1845.

== Architectural characteristics ==
The church was built with basalt and reddish-pink colored stones, it was a basilica-style structure with a four-sided dome and a cross-like roof. In the eastern part of the church, on both sides of the main altar, there were quite large and semicircular altars. The church had three entrances, which were located on the southern, western and eastern sides. The domed basilica had three apses facing a main hall, and under the apses were vestries that could be accessed from their bemas. The cupola rested on four cruciform pillars. There were Armenian inscriptions on the southern facade and decorative sculptures around the entrances and windows.

== Destruction ==
The church was still a standing monument in the 1980s. It has been completely destroyed by February 3, 2000, according to the Caucasus Heritage Watch.

== See also ==
- St. Kristapor Church (Yukhari Aylis)
- Saint Thomas Monastery of Agulis
- St. Shmavon Church (Yukhari Aylis)
- St. Hakob-Hayrapet Church (Yukhari Aylis)
