= Mets Astvatsatsin Monastery (Yukhari Aylis) =

Armenian monastery complex

- Մեծ Աստվածածին վանք
- Interactive map of Mets Astvatsatsin Monastery

Monastery information
- Denomination: Armenian Apostolic Church
- Established: 1st Century

Architecture
- Status: Destroyed

Site
- Location: Yukhari Aylis
- Country: Azerbaijan

Mets Astvatsatsin Monastery was an Armenian monastery complex located on the slope of a hill, some 1.5 km east of Yukhari Aylis village (Ordubad district) of the Nakhchivan Autonomous Republic of Azerbaijan. The monastery complex was completely erased in 2000–2009.

== History ==
The monastery was founded by Thaddeus the Apostle in the 1st century, according to local legend. It was rebuilt in the 12th–13th centuries, in the 17th century, and in the 18th century. It was a partially standing and dilapidated monument in the 1980s.

== Architectural characteristics ==
The monastery complex was enclosed by a high outer wall and the entire complex of the buildings was perched on a hillside with a sweeping view of the plain of Yukhari Aylis.

The epithet "Mets" (Armenian: large) was given to this monastery in order to distinguish it from the other St. Astvatsatsin Church in Yukhari Aylis. The church of Mets Astvatsatsin was part of a large architectural complex that included a porch, a guesthouse, and ten to twelve other buildings that were all at one time surrounded with a high outer wall. The monastery complex had also a vineyard and a fountain. In the 1980s, most of the buildings and the outer wall were in ruins, and the church was abandoned and dilapidated. After investigating this complex and its vicinity, Argam Ayvazyan concludes that this location had been the site of an ancient pagan temple. According to the traditions of the natives of Agulis, the Apostle Thaddeus destroyed the idols of the pagan gods and founded a church. During the ensuing centuries statuettes of gods made out of clay and metal were frequently discovered there, especially when renovations were in progress, according to the testimony of eyewitnesses.

== Destruction ==
The monastery complex was a partially standing monument in the later Soviet period (the 1980s). According to the investigation of the Caucasus Heritage Watch, the monastery had been largely demolished by February 25, 2000. An IKONOS satellite image of 2000 shows only one area of the complex in the north still standing, suggesting destruction of the complex was in process in 2000. By June 28, 2009, a QuickBird satellite image shows that the erasure of the monastery had been completed.
