= Yuxarı Əylis =

Village and municipality in Ordubad, Nakhchivan, Azerbaijan

Yuxarı Əylis Վերին Ագուլիս
- Municipality
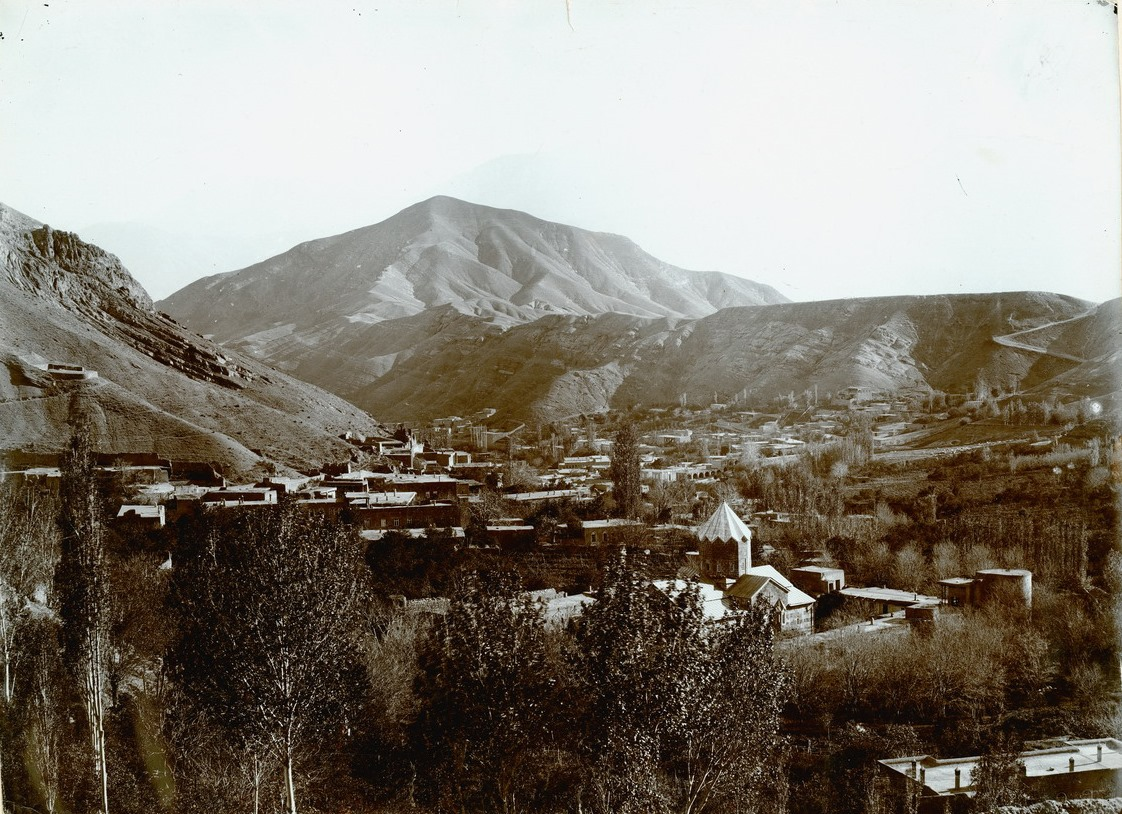
- Town panorama in the early 1900s

- Location within Azerbaijan
- Coordinates: 38°57′10″N 45°58′53″E
- Country: Azerbaijan
- Autonomous republic: Nakhchivan
- District: Ordubad

Population (2005)
  - Total: 1,916
- Time zone: UTC+4 (AZT)

Yuxarı Əylis (Armenian: Վերին Ագուլիս, romanized: Verin Agulis, lit. 'Upper Agulis') is a village and municipality in the Ordubad District of Nakhchivan, Azerbaijan. It is located in the left and right sides of the Ordubad-Aylis highway, 12 km in the north-east from the district center. Its population is busy with gardening, farming, animal husbandry. There are secondary school, club, library, communication branch and a medical center in the village. It has a population of 1,916.

The village was an important settlement of the Vaspurakan province of the Kingdom of Armenia or the Vaspurakan Kingdom, and a number of Armenian merchants who plied their trade along the Silk Road were of Agulis origin.

== History ==
The settlement was first mentioned in historical sources in the 11th century under the Armenian name Argulik (Armenian: Արքուլիք). Agulis was known from antiquity as an Armenian cultural center of trade and crafts being a part of the Vaspurakan province of the Kingdom of Armenia.

Its Armenian population specialized in the production of handicraft and sericulture. Numerous sixteenth-century sources spoke of it as a thriving town that maintained strong commercial links with India, Russia, Safavid Persia and Western Europe.

In the 18th century, Agulis had its own schools, a library, a silkworm factory, a large market. The town was enclosed by walls and surrounded by orchards and vineyards. Its Armenian population at the time was recorded at 8,000 households. In 1752, it was captured and subjected to a heavy sack by the armies of Azat Khan, the ruler of Āzarbāijān. The town was incorporated into the Russian Empire in 1828, following the Russo-Persian War. By 1897, when a census was carried out by the Russian government, Agulis' population had dropped to 1,670.

In the nineteenth century, Verin ("Upper") Agulis, together with the adjoining Nerkin ("Lower") Agulis, was a major Armenian settlement in the Nakhchivan Uyezd of the Erivan Governorate, with twelve churches and monasteries. The most important church was the St. Thomas the Apostle Monastery, founded in the first century and restored in 1694. The monastery was an important center of learning whose alumni included the merchant and traveler Zakaria Aguletsi, A. Araskhanyan, animal breeder Avetis H. Kalantar, and L. Manvelyan. The community also spoke a unique dialect of Armenian called Zok.

=== Destruction in 1919 ===
In the spring of 1919, the First Republic of Armenia extended administrative control over the region of Sharur-Nakhchivan, with Agulis being made the centre for the sub-district of Goghtan. But in the summer of the year, a Muslim insurgency broke out against Armenian rule, and in August the region came under the control of the newly appointed commissar of Ordubad, Abbas Guli Bey Tahirov. Agulis pledged its loyalty to Tahirov, although in the following months, its inhabitants faced a growing food crisis and were not allowed to leave the town. The plight of its inhabitants worsened when, in November of that year, the Azerbaijan Democratic Republic unsuccessfully attempted to wrest the region of Zangezur from Armenian control.

Matters came to a head on December 17, when a frenzied Muslim mob, made up of locals and refugees fleeing from the fighting in Armenia, made its way to Lower Agulis and began to attack its Armenian inhabitants, forcing them to retreat to the upper town. On December 24, the mob, joined by the local Azerbaijani gendarmerie, entered Upper Agulis and started to pillage the town. They then proceeded to massacre its Armenian population, leaving Upper Agulis in smouldering ruins the next day. According to the Armenian government, up to 400 Armenians were killed in Lower Agulis and up to 1,000 in Upper Agulis. The town was partially rebuilt during the Soviet period.

== Monuments ==
St. Thomas Monastery was, according to the legend, founded by Bartholomew the Apostle. It was last restored in 1694. It, along with other Armenian churches, were destroyed by Azerbaijan state authorities toward the end of the 1990s, at some point between 1997 and 2009 On May 15, 2014, a mosque was constructed on the place of the monastery complex. St. Stepanos Church was located on the slope of a hill in the northwestern Verin Get district of the village. It has been completely destroyed by February 3, 2000.

== Demographics ==
According to the Russian Empire Census in 1897, where the village was split into Armenian and Tatar (later known as Azerbaijanis) ethnic-quarters, it had a total population of 1,971 consisting of 1,325 Armenian Apostolics and 639 Muslims. The village had 863 men and 1,108 women.

== Cultural references ==
The 1919 destruction of Agulis is referred to in the controversial 2012 novella Stone Dreams by Azerbaijani writer Akram Aylisli.

== Notable natives ==
- Christapor Mikaelian - One of the founders of the Armenian Revolutionary Federation
- Ziya Kyazim — Azerbaijani Soviet actor, People's Artist of Azerbaijan SSR (1943)
- Akram Aylisli - Azerbaijani writer
- Mouchegh and Melkoum Petrossian - Founders of Caviar Petrossian in Paris, France.
- Lusik Aguletsi - Armenian painter and ethnographer

== See also ==
- Agulis (historical)
- Aşağı Əylis
- St. Shmavon Church (Yukhari Aylis)
- Mets Astvatsatsin Monastery (Yukhari Aylis)
- St. Hakob-Hayrapet Church (Yukhari Aylis)
- St. Hovhannes-Mkrtich Church (Yukhari Aylis)
