= Akram Aylisli =

Azerbaijani writer and politician

- Əkrəm Əylisli
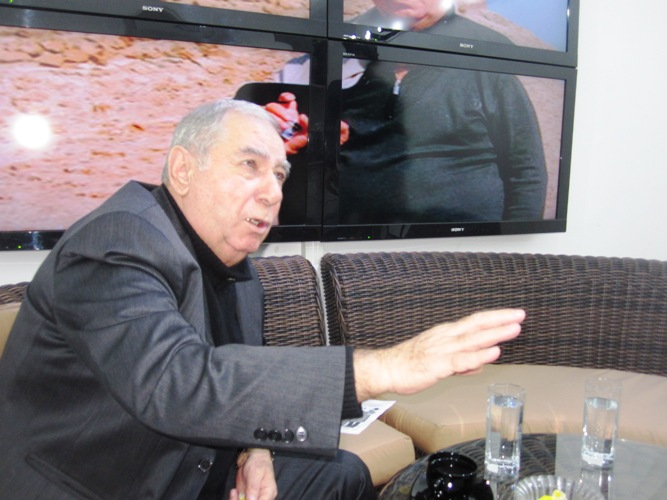
- Born: Akram Najaf oglu Naibov; January 12, 1937 (age 89); Aylis, Soviet Azerbaijan
- Spouse: Galina Aylisli
- Children: Iljas Naibov, Najaf Naibov
- Writing career
- Notable awards: People's Writer (Revoked)

Akram Najaf oglu Naibov (Azerbaijani: Əkrəm Nəcəf oğlu Naibov, born December 6, 1937), better known by his pen name Akram Aylisli (Əkrəm Əylisli), is an Azerbaijani writer, playwright, novelist and former member of parliament. His works have been translated from his native Azerbaijani into a number of languages in the former Soviet Union and around the world. He was decorated by the President of Azerbaijan with the prestigious "Istiglal" (2002) and "Shokhrat" orders. In 2013, after the publication of Aylisli's Stone Dreams novella, which depicted the pogroms carried out by Azerbaijanis against the Armenians in Sumgait and Baku and presented Armenians in sympathetic light, President Aliyev signed a presidential decree that stripped Aylisli of the title of "People's Writer" and the presidential pension. His books were burnt by Azerbaijani intelligentsia and compatriots in his hometown, his son and wife were fired from their jobs and a "bounty" of some $13,000 was promised for cutting the writer's ear off. In March 2014, a formal request was made by various public figures throughout the world to nominate Aylisli for the Nobel Peace Prize.

In the summer 2026, Aylisli won the 2026 EBRD Literature Prize for "People and Trees, a Trilogy". The award was accepted by Katherine E Young on behalf of the author. In commenting on the award, literary critic Maya Jaggi said that Aylisli's "fraught life as much as his courageous works reflects the challenges facing his country", and also highlighted that he had "described himself humbly as a ‘writer and humanist with the ability to feel pity for another’s pain’."

== Biography ==
Aylisli was born in the village of Aylis in 1937 in the Ordubad region of the Nakhchivan, part of Soviet Azerbaijan, near the borders of Armenia and Iran. His mother, Leya Ali Kyzy, was the village storyteller, his father died in WWII when Akram was five. His youth in the Soviet Union coincided with one of its more liberal periods: the years of de-Stalinization and the 'Thaw' under the flamboyant leadership of Nikita Khrushchev. Aylisli received his graduate education at the Maxim Gorky Literature Institute in Moscow, the elite school of creative writing for Soviet writers.

His first work, a poem entitled "Qeşem ve onun Kürekeni", was published in the journal Azerbaycan. During Soviet times, Aylisli was a poet, translator, and playwright, and he authored a number of novels: "Trees without Shade", "Shining of the six suns", "The season of colorful dresses", "The white canyon", "The dam", "Peoples and Trees" and others. Most of Aylisli's works are associated with this native village. Aylisli's stories and novels, so subtle and full of affection for peasant life, are very popular in Azerbaijan and the Soviet Union. His novel "Peoples and Trees" has been translated into more than thirty languages and published beyond Soviet borders in the countries of Eastern Europe. Сonceptually and personally, Aylisli was close to the Russian "Village Prose" movement.

Aylisli was also the author of a number of dramas and plays, including "Quşu Uçan Budaqlar", "Menim Neğmekar Bibim", "Bağdada Putyovka Var", and "Vezife", which were staged and shown in theaters in Baku, Nakhchivan, Ganja, and Yerevan. Moreover, Aylisli worked as a translator. He translated into Azeri the books by Gabriel García Márquez, Heinrich Böll, Ivan Turgenev, Konstantin Paustovsky, Vladimir Korolenko, Anton Chekhov, Vasily Shukshin, Chinghiz Aitmatov, Salman Rushdie.

From 1968 to 1970, he became the editor-in-chief of "Gençlik", and later worked as a satirist for the journal Mozalan. From 1974 to 1978, he served on the Azerbaijan SSR's State Committee for Cinematography.

Aylisli was awarded the title of "People's Writer" as well as the highest state awards of Azerbaijan – the medals of "Shokhrat" ("Honor") and "Istiglal" ("Independence"). In November 2005, he was elected to the National Assembly of Azerbaijan (Milli Majlis) as a member of parliament representing his constituency in Julfa-Ordubad. He served for one term, which ended on November 7, 2010.

Aylisli is generally supportive of left wing views. His works published in the Soviet Union did not conform to socialist realism, than some other writers of the Azerbaijan SSR at that time, and he spoke negatively about the Soviet era for a while in the 1990s. In one of his recent interviews broadcast on television channel ANS TV he stated that he believes that Karl Marx was a genius, and the world will come to his ideas sooner or later.

== Stone Dreams controversy ==
In late 2012 and early 2013, Aylisli found himself embroiled in controversy when his novella, Daş yuxular (Stone Dreams), was published in a Russian-language journal Druzhba Narodov (Friendship of the Peoples). It covers the pogroms of Armenians in Baku in 1989 and the massacre of Armenians in his native village by Turkish troops in 1919. The scenes of the recent past and the tales of old people about the Armenian massacre intertwined in the novel. The original book was written in 2006 in Azerbaijani language, but the author postponed the publication because he did not like the translation into Russian, which later performed by himself. The Original book in Azerbaijani has never been published ever since.

=== Plot ===
The novel tells the story of the Azerbaijani actor Saday Sadykhly and his efforts to protect his Armenian neighbors during the Sumgait and Baku Pogroms in the closing years of the Soviet Union. The novel begins as the severely beaten Sadykhly is being transported to the hospital: while trying to protect his Armenian neighbor he was also assaulted by the yeraz [Azeri refugees from Armenia] on the streets of Baku, who mistook him too for an Armenian.

There are four main characters in the novel. Sadai Sadykhly, his friend Nunavrish Karabahly, also an actor, Sadykhly's father-in-law Professor of psychiatry, Dr. Abbasaliev and a surgeon in the hospital where Sadykhly was taken right after assault, Dr. Farid Farzaneh. Although it looks like that Sadykhly was recovering at the beginning, by the end his body couldn't sustain the physical injuries or the nervous pressure, and so he died.

=== Accusations ===
If a single candle were lighted for every murdered Armenian, the light from these candles would be brighter than that of the moon

— The Stone Dreams

Many in Azerbaijan took offense to Aylisli's sympathetic portrayal of Armenians, with whom they were at war with over control of the region of Nagorno-Karabakh in the early 1990s. The novella stirred resentment by depicting only the Azerbaijani brutality against Armenians during the conflict, while never mentioning incidents of alleged Armenian violence against Azerbaijanis, such as the Khojaly massacre.

There are some other controversial aspects to the novel. Shortly after the pogroms in Sumgait at the beginning of March 1988 Sadyghly wants "to go to Echmiadzin in order to convert to Christianity with the blessing of the Armenian Catholicos, stay [there] forever as a monk begging God to forgive Muslims for all the evils which they committed against Armenians." This element to the novel is likely to be deeply frustrating for many Azerbaijani readers, considering the ambiguous role played by the Armenian Catholicos in the events of the late 1980s. Vazgen I did not act to protect the Azerbaijani population of Armenia or to prevent their expulsion, becoming an unpopular figure in Azerbaijan and his name a derogatory one.

Another sensitive taboo seemingly questioned by Aylisli is the significance of circumcision—a ritual sacred to every practicing Muslim. Dr. Farzani, who is married to a Russian woman, wants to have their son circumcised. But his wife asks Farzani whether the Prophet is wiser than God. Ultimately, their son comes to see circumcision as an act of violence on his body, and this reaction eventually breaks Farzani's family apart. Such a controversial portrayal of a concept as sacred as circumcision is likely to prove very irritating for some Azerbaijani readers.

=== Harassment campaign ===
Soon after Stone Dreams was published, the honored writer became an enemy of the state. Mass media launched a wide-scale bullying campaign.

Let them burn all my books because they have not saved anyone...

— Akram Aylisli

In Baku, Ganja, and in the writer's native village, rallies were organized where people cried out slogans such as "Death to Akram Aylisli!", "Traitor!", "Why have you sold yourself out to the Armenians?", "Akram is Armenian!", and they set his books and portraits on fire. Youth Organization of Refugees from Nagorno-Karabakh announced their and other NGOs dealing with the affairs of veterans, refugees and IDPs' intention to take legal action against Aylisli.

On February 7, 2013, the President of Azerbaijan Ilham Aliyev signed a presidential decree that stripped Aylisli of his title "People's Writer" and the personal pension that went with it.

Ali Hasanov, Head of the Azerbaijani Presidential Administration's Social and Political Department, denounced him for purportedly having no national spirit or sense of humanity, for disrespecting the memory of those who died during the war, and for posing as a defender of human values. He added that Aylisli represents Armenian youth who killed thousands of Azerbaijanis, and took control over Azerbaijani lands and committed the massacre in Khojaly, but that he represents Azerbaijanis as murderers and weak personalities. He further added that as Azerbaijanis, they "must express public hatred towards these people."

If I were Armenian, everybody would have already known about that. And I would not be ashamed of that!

— Akram Aylisli

Parliamentarians of the National Assembly during the special session required to deprive Aylisli of all state awards, and his Azerbaijani citizenship, and insisted that he move to Armenia. Parliamentarians commented that the novella "insulted not only Azerbaijanis, but the whole Turkish nation," on account of references to the Ottoman Empire's historical persecution of Armenians. They suggested that Aylisli have DNA tested to determine if he was genetically ethnic Armenian. The Chairmen of the National Assembly Ogtay Asadov stated "There is something suspicious in the blood of everybody who supports Aylisli".

The Ministry of Education withdrew his works from the school curriculum. Aylisli's plays were banned from theaters. A lot of Azerbaijani writers, artists and academics repudiated him. Union of Azerbaijani Writers convened a meeting and expelled Aylisli from its membership.

Aylisili's wife and son were fired from their jobs.

The chairman of the Caucasian Muslim Board, Sheikh Allahshukur Pashazadeh, branded him an apostate.

Hafiz Haciyev, leader of the pro-government political party Muasir Musavat (Modern Equality), said his party would pay $13,000 to anyone who would cut Aylisli's ear off. After coming under strong pressure from foreign embassies and U.S. Department of State on the Azerbaijani government, the Ministry of Interior forced Muasir Musavat to rescind the reward.

=== Author's reaction ===
Responding to the critics accusing him of being partial, the writer has said: "If I had any doubt that I had disgraced my people that would break me. But they think that when I say two good words about some Armenian, I must say three good ones about an Azerbaijani. But it's not my business to keep that foolish balance! In my story I depict a character and his perception of reality. His mind is very fragile; he's on the brink of insanity." Aylisli defended himself in an interview, commenting that "Armenians are not enemies for me....How can they be? I am a writer living in the 21st century. A solution to Nagorno-Karabakh is being delayed, and hostility is growing between the two nations. I want to contribute to a peaceful solution." In answer to accusation of betrayal Aylisli claimed that he is not a patriot: Where have you seen a writer as a patriot? He must write everything his mind and reason tell him to."

=== Support ===
On February 3, 2013, a group of young independent intellectuals organized a small demonstration near the monument of Mirza Alakbar Sabir to support Akram Aylisli. A number of Azerbaijani writers and intellectuals, including writer and screenwriter Rustam Ibragimbekov, also spoke out in defence of Aylisli.

Leyla Yunus, an Azerbaijani human right activist, claimed that "Only Aylisli defends the honor and the dignity of our nation after the story of Ramil Safarov". Ragıp Zarakolu, a Turkish human right activist and publisher who is well known for facing legal harassment for a long time for publishing books about the Armenian genocide, also supported Aylisli.

Human Rights Watch, Helsinki Citizens' Assembly and the Institute for the Protection of Media Rights spoke up for Aylisli. Human Rights Watch (HRW) voiced its concern for Aylisli's physical safety and called for Azerbaijan's "government to end [the] hostile campaign of intimidation." "The government of Azerbaijan is making a mockery of its international obligations on freedom of expression," remarked HRW's Europe and Central Asia director Hugh Williamson.

The chairman of Armenia's Union of Writers, Levon Ananyan, offered a formal response to the controversy on February 8, saying, "Kudos to our Azerbaijani colleague! He is that brave man who blazes the trail, the trail that leads to repentance through truth." Ananyan added that "Not only Armenians, but also Russians, all people that are concerned about the future of the country...should share this braveness."

The Russian PEN center and a number of Russian writers, including Boris Akunin, Andrei Bitov, Viktor Erofeev, Sergey Kaledin and Lev Anninsky, also declared their support for Ayilisli.

In February 2014, a formal request was made by various public figures throughout the world to nominate Aylisli for the Nobel Peace Prize - "For courage shown in his efforts to reconcile the Azerbaijani and Armenian people". Among the nominators were social science professors and university presidents such as Craig Calhoun and Immanuel Wallerstein from the US, and Theodor Shanin from the UK. They noted that Akram Aylisli was probably the first Turkic author who wrote a book of penitence for the Armenian Genocide. "Aylisli was the first to express that pain in a literary work which is very personal, deep and hard-won. <...> Mr Aylisli's actions are important not only for Armenians and Azerbaijanis, but for others all across the former Soviet Union, who have been blinded by ethnic hatred. His example in fact transcends location, ethnicity or political persuasion. His lone resistance, his defiance, his willingness to sacrifice all for the sake of truth, is an encouragement to each of us to be brave. <...> Mr Aylisli is one of those rare people such as Martin Luther King and Andrey Sakharov, whose personal courage and moral impulse can change a nation's fate and destroy the walls dividing nations."

In July 2026, Aylislie received the EBRD Literature Prize.

== Works ==
- Gilas ağacı [Wild Cherry Tree]. Baku: Uşaqgəncnəşr, 1961, 47 pages.
- Dağlara çən düşəndə [When the Mountains Fell]. Baku: Azərnəşr, 1963, 56 pages.
- Atalar və atasızlar [Fathers and Fatherless]. Baku: Azərnəşr, 1965, 121 pages.
- Mənim nəğməkar bibim [My Singer is my Aunt]. Baku: Azərnəşr, 1968
- Adamlar və ağaclar [Men and Trees]. Baku: Gənclik, 1970, 247 pages.
- Kür qırağının meşələri [Forests of Clay]. Baku: Gənclik, 1971, 50 pages.
- Ürək yaman şeydir [Heartbreaking]. Baku: Gənclik, 1973, 152 pages.
- Bu kənddən bir qatar keçdi [A Train From This Village]. Baku: Azərnəşr, 1977, 267 pages.
- Gilənar çiçəyinin dedikləri [Faded Flower They Say]. Baku: Yazıçı, 1983, 438 pages.
- Adamlar və ağaclar [Men and Trees]. Baku: Gənclik, 1985, 320 pages.
- Ədəbiyyat yanğısı [Literary Fire]. Baku: Yazıçı, 1989.
- Seçilmiş əsərləri (iki cilddə) [Selected works in two volumes]. 1st vol. Baku: Azərnəşr, 1987, 497 pages.
- Seçilmiş əsərləri (iki cilddə) [Selected works in two volumes]. 2nd vol. Baku: Azərnəşr, 1987, 416 pages.
- Möhtəşəm tıxac (novel) [Great Traffic Jam]
- Daş yuxular (novel) [Stone Dreams]
  - Russian translation published as Акрам АЙЛИСЛИ: Каменные сны. Дружба Народов 2012, 12 (online at Журнальный зал)

In English Translation

- Farewell, Aylis : a non-traditional novel in three works, Katherine E Young, (translator) Brighton, MA : Academic Studies Press, 2018. ISBN 9781618117953, OCLC 1051776488
- People and Trees: A Trilogy, Katherine E Young, (translator) Brighton, MA : Plamen Press, 2024. ISBN 9781951508418
