= St. Shmavon Church (Yukhari Aylis) =

Armenian Apostolic Church in Nakhchivan, Azerbaijan

- Սբ․ Շմավոն եկեղեցի
- St. Shmavon Church
- Location: Yukhari Aylis
- Country: Azerbaijan
- Denomination: Armenian Apostolic Church

History
- Status: Destroyed

Architecture
- Demolished: 1997–2000

St. Shmavon Church was an Armenian Apostolic Church located on the right bank of the Aylis (Agulis) River in Yukhari Aylis village of the Nakhchivan Autonomous Republic of Azerbaijan. It was located some 400-600m southwest of St. Kristapor Church of the same village. It has been completely erased by February 2000.

== History ==
The church was rebuilt in the 17th century and a manuscript dated 1638 is known to have been copied at St. Shmavon. In the 1980s, only two pillars, the apse, and a segment of the northern wall remained from the church. An earlier source describes interior paintings on the arches and the drum of the dome that depicted plant motifs and images of four angels with spread wings. There were Armenian inscriptions on the western and southern facades, it also known to have included a scriptorium.

== Destruction ==
The remainings of the church have been completely destroyed at some point between 1997 and 2000, according to the Caucasus Heritage Watch.

== See also ==
- St. Stepanos Church (Yukhari Aylis)
- Saint Thomas Monastery of Agulis
- St. Hakob-Hayrapet Church (Yukhari Aylis)
- St. Kristapor Church (Yukhari Aylis)
