= Saint Thomas Monastery of Agulis =

Armenian Apostolic monastery in Nakhchivan, Azerbaijan

- Ագուլիսի Սուրբ Թովմա առաքյալ վանք or Ագուլիսի վանք
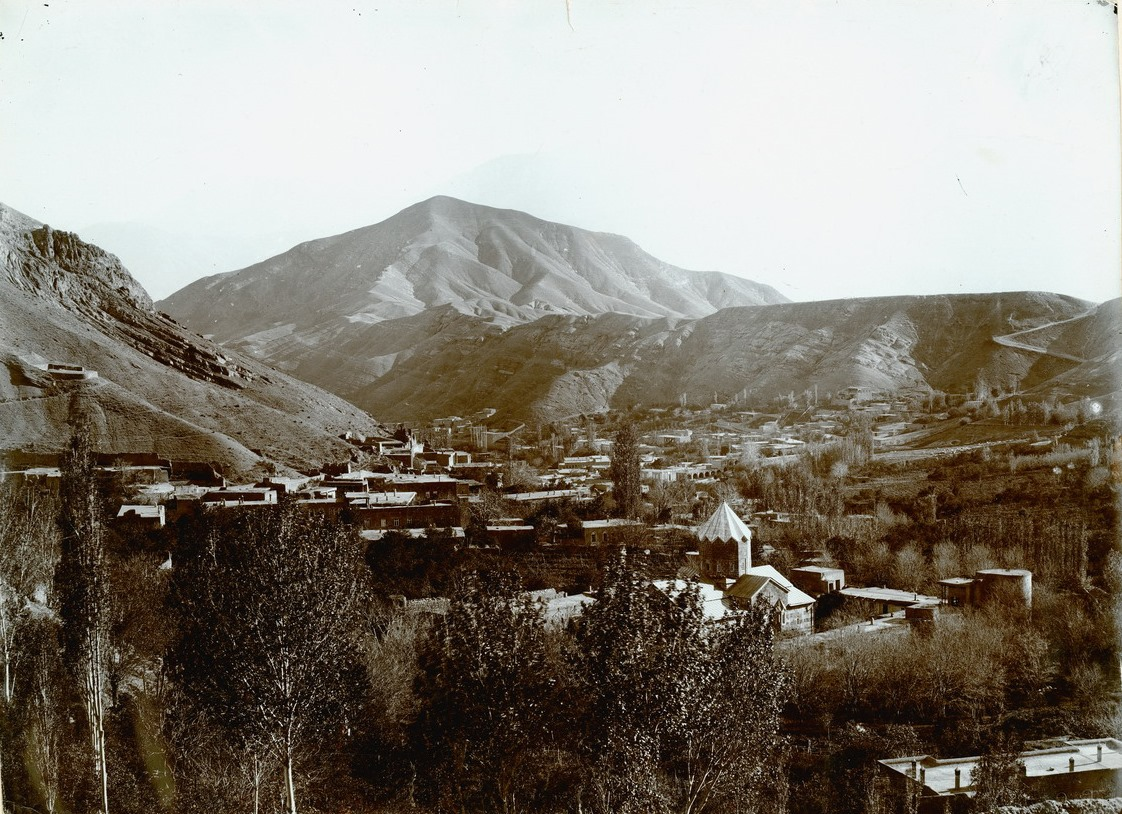
- Saint Thomas Monastery of Agulis

- Location within Azerbaijan

Religion
- Affiliation: Armenian Apostolic Church
- Rite: Armenian Apostolic
- Ecclesiastical or organisational status: yes
- Status: Destroyed

Location
- Location: Yuxarı Əylis, Nakhchivan, Azerbaijan
- Coordinates: 38°57′10″N 45°58′53″E

Architecture
- Style: Armenian
- Completed: 4th century

Saint Thomas Monastery of Agulis (Armenian: Ագուլիսի Սուրբ Թովմա առաքյալ վանք) was an Armenian Apostolic monastery, located in the Yuxarı Əylis village of the Nakhchivan Autonomous Republic of Azerbaijan. It was historically built in the Goghtn district of the historical Armenian province of Vaspurakan.

== History ==
According to tradition, St. Thomas Monastery was founded by St. Bartholomew the Apostle in the 1st century, and his pupil, Kums (hy), was appointed its priest. It was probably a small chapel-like building that was rebuilt and expanded after the conversion of Armenia to Christianity. It was the centre of Goghtn parish, from the early Middle Ages to 1838. In the monastery there were some relics: right hand of Thomas the Apostle donated by Catholicos Yeprem I in 1821, relic of St. Gayané (fr) and right hand of Hakop Hayrapet. The monastery had a cemetery belonging to the 13th to 19th centuries. It was located about 250 m northeast of the complex.

== Architecture ==
St. Thomas Monastery consisted of a temple, bell towers, a wall and auxiliary buildings. The church of the monastery was probably damaged by the earthquake of 1679 and in 1694 a completely new church was built, with polished basalt, reddish felsite, a seven-sided tabernacle on the inside and a dome-shaped basilica with four crosses.

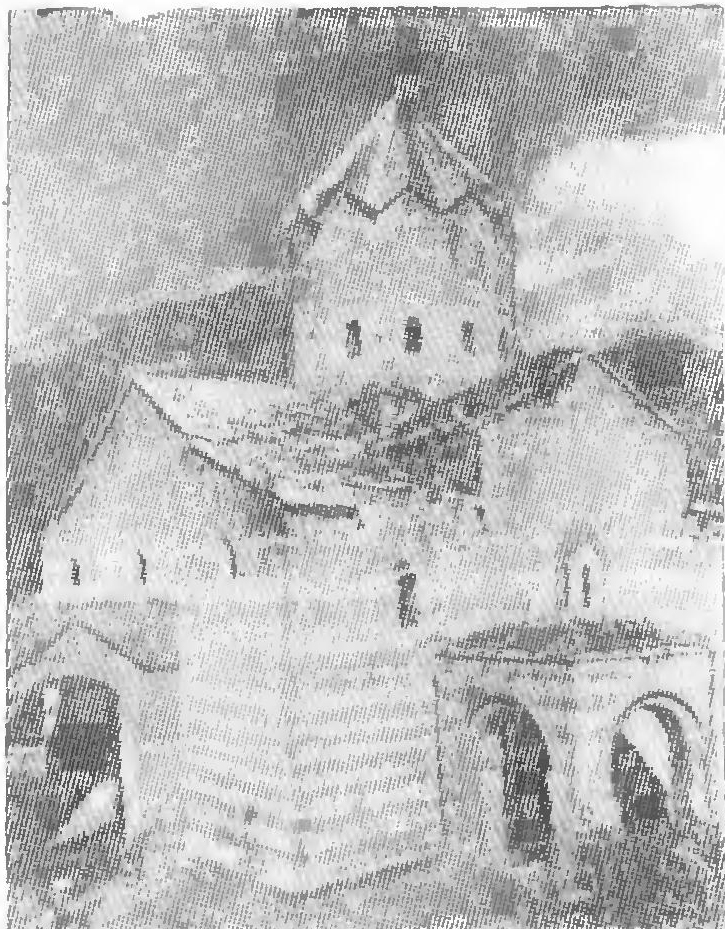
St. Thomas Monastery in early 20th century

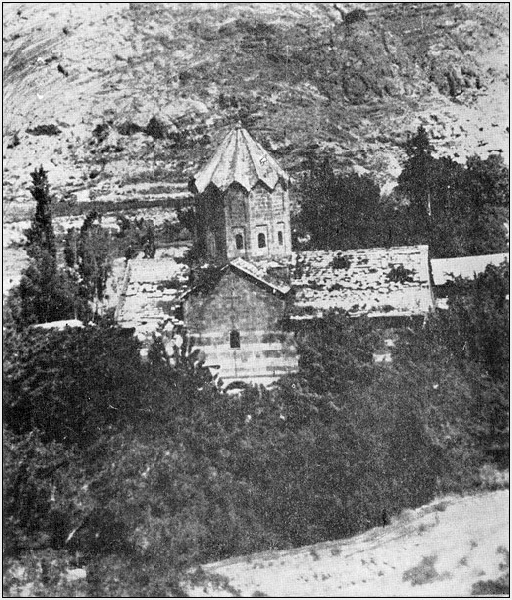
St. Thomas Monastery

== Current status ==
In 1919, Turkish troops destroyed Agulis, massacred the Armenian population and looted the monastery, which was later abandoned and deserted. The monastery was still standing in the 1990s. Large structures in the monastery were in the process of being dismantled in February 2000. The complete destruction and erasure of the monastery was already complete by June 28, 2009. On May 15, 2014, a mosque was constructed on the place of the monastery complex.

== See also ==
- List of Armenian churches in Azerbaijan
- St. Kristapor Church (Yukhari Aylis)
- St. Shmavon Church (Yukhari Aylis)
- St. Hakob-Hayrapet Church (Yukhari Aylis)

== Sources ==
- Հակոբյան Թ. Խ., Մելիք-Բախշյան Ստ. Տ., Բարսեղյան Հ. Խ., Հայաստանի և հարակից շրջանների տեղանունների բառարան, հ. 1 [Դ-Կ] (խմբ. Մանուկյան Լ. Գ.), Երևան, «Երևանի Համալսարանի Հրատարակչություն», 1986, էջ 27 — 1008 էջ։
- Ստեփան Մելիք-Բախշյան, Հայոց պաշտամունքային վայրեր, Երևան, «ԵՊՀ հրատարակչություն», 2009 — 6, էջեր 6 — 432 + 10 էջ ներդիր էջ. — 500 հատ։
- Ղևոնդ Ալիշան, Սիսական, էջ 326
- Հ. Շահխաթունեանց, Ստորագրություն, էջ 325
- Ե. Լալայան, Գողթն, էջ 69
- Մ. Փափազյան. Հնութիւնք Հայրենեաց, Դ., Թ. էջ 287
- Արգամ Այվազյան, Նախիջևանի ԻՍՍՀ հայկական հուշարձանները։ Համահավաք ցուցակ (խմբ. խմբ. Բ. Ա. Ուլուբաբյան), Երևան, «Հայաստան», 1986 — 21, էջեր 21 — 224 էջ։
