= Nakhichevan uezd =

Coordinates: 39°12′58″N 45°24′38″E

Nakhichevan uezd Нахичеванский уезд
- Uezd
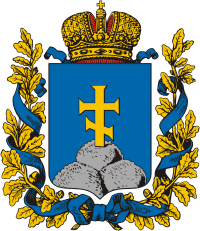
- Coat of arms

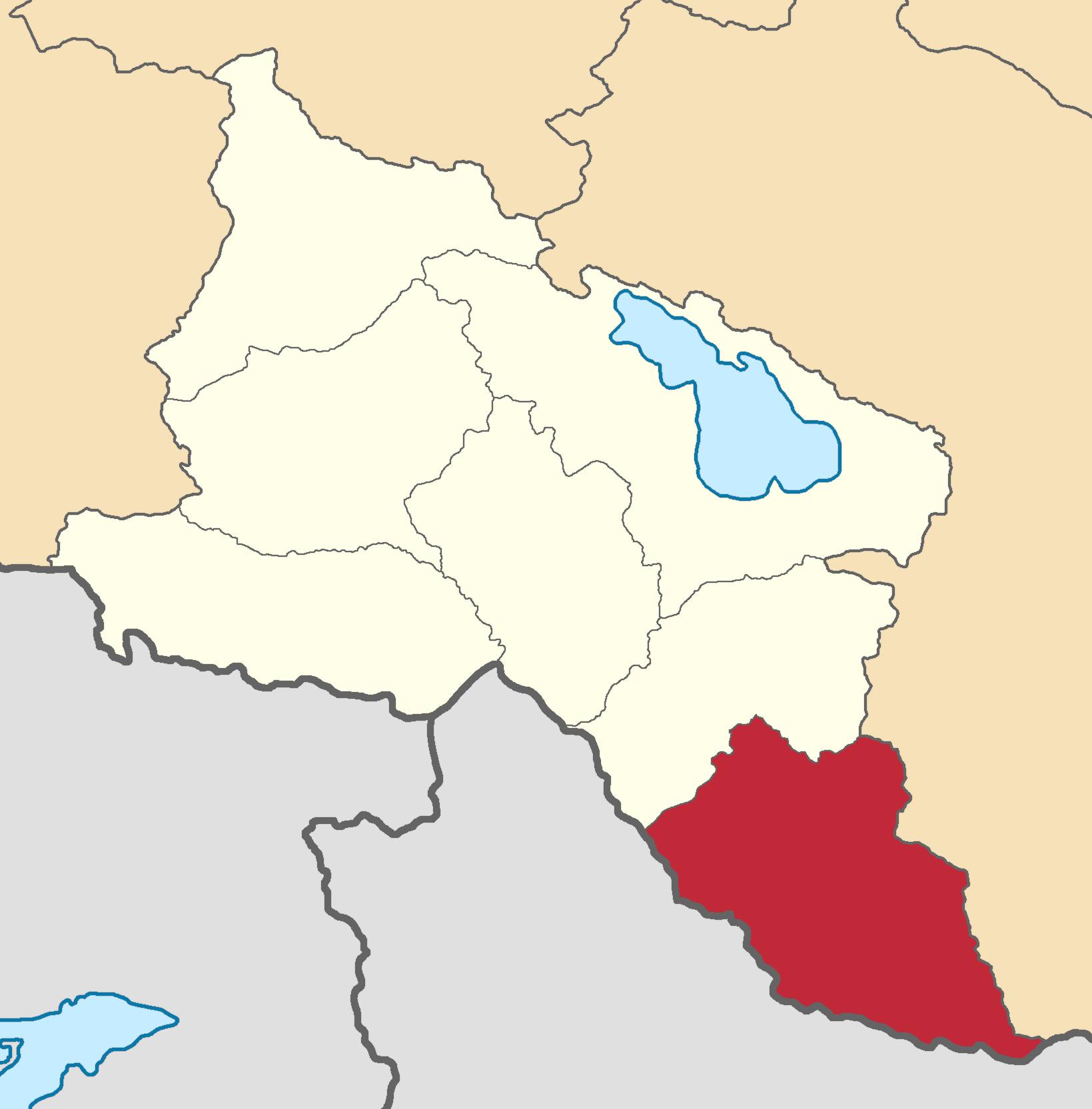
- Location in the Erivan Governorate
- Country: Russian Empire
- Viceroyalty: Caucasus
- Governorate: Erivan
- Established: 1840
- Abolished: 1929
- Capital: Nakhichevan (present-day Nakhchivan)

Area
  - Total: 4,482.87 km^{2} (1,730.85 sq mi)

Population (1916)
  - Total: 136,859
  - Density: 30.5293/km^{2} (79.0706/sq mi)
  - Urban: 10.71%
  - Rural: 89.29%

The Nakhichevan uezd (Note: Russian: Нахичева́нскій уѣ́здъ, romanized: Nakhichevánsky uyézd; Azerbaijani: نخچوان قضاسی, romanized: Naxçıvān qaz̤āsı; Armenian: Նախիջևանի գավառ, romanized: Naxiǰewani gavaṙ) was a county (uezd) of the Erivan Governorate of the Caucasus Viceroyalty of the Russian Empire. It bordered the governorate's Sharur-Daralayaz uezd to the north, the Zangezur uezd of the Elizavetpol Governorate to the east, and Iran to the south. The uezd's administrative center was the city of Nakhichevan (present-day Nakhchivan).

The county was mostly mountainous and devoid of industry beyond salt plantations. Before the Russian Revolution it was home to more than 81,200 Muslims (Note: Primarily Tatars.) who formed the majority of the population, and a significant minority of 54,200 Armenians who would later be massacred or displaced during the Armenian–Azerbaijani war of 1918–1920.

Originally formed from the Nakhichevan Khanate, the Nakhichevan uezd was part of the Armenian Oblast and later the governorate of Erivan. Shortly after the Bolshevik coup, the district fell under the control of the invading Ottoman army (and was briefly annexed by the Treaty of Batum) until the latter's withdrawal in late 1918—In the wake of the retreat, the district came under the control of local Muslims between 1919 and 1920, with brief periods of Armenian control in the middle of each year, ending with region's takeover by the 11th Army of Soviet Russia. Finally, the district was transformed into the Nakhchivan exclave of Azerbaijan and later partitioned with Armenia (forming parts of the latter's Syunik and Vayots Dzor provinces) whilst part of the Transcaucasian SFSR.

== History ==
=== Background ===
The topography of the uezd was mainly mountainous with most of the lowland located along the Aras river. The highest peaks of the uezd (Kambil at 11,188 feet (3,410 m); Damara-dag at 11,090 feet (3,380 m); and Mount Kaputjukh at 12,855 feet (3,918 m)) were located along the Karabakh Range, which made up the eastern boundary with the Elizavetpol Governorate. Kyuki-dag at 10,282 feet (3,134 m) rose from the Sharur-Daralayaz uezd in the north. The left tributaries of the Aras (the Nakhichevan-chay, Alinja-chay, and Gilan-chay) flowed through the territory of the uezd. The population of the uezd was primarily engaged in cattle breeding and gardening, especially in the Ordubad area. There were practically no industrial plants or factories, but there were however salt plantations which produced approximately 250,000 pounds of salt per annum.

The subcounties (uchastoks) of the Nakhichevan uezd in 1913 were as follows:

| Name | 1912 population | Area |
|---|---|---|
| 1-y uchastok (1-й участок) | 25,497 | 660.62 square versts (751.83 km^{2}; 290.28 mi^{2}) |
| 2-y uchastok (2-й участок) | 28,243 | 1,253.92 square versts (1,427.04 km^{2}; 550.98 mi^{2}) |
| 3-y uchastok (3-й участок) | 25,241 | 1,327.35 square versts (1,510.61 km^{2}; 583.25 mi^{2}) |
| 4-y uchastok (4-й участок) | 32,651 | 697.15 square versts (793.40 km^{2}; 306.33 mi^{2}) |

=== Russian rule and World War I ===
The Nakhichevan uezd, based in the city Nakhichevan, was originally one of the territorial administrative subunits of the Armenian Oblast in 1828–1840, created after its annexation into the Russian Empire in 1828 through the Treaty of Turkmenchay. The territory of the uezd roughly corresponded to the defunct Nakhichevan Khanate and was the site of large-scale Armenian repatriation from Iran, which was across the Aras river to the south.

In 1844, the Caucasus Viceroyalty was reestablished, in which the Nakhichevan uezd briefly formed part of the Tiflis Governorate before its transfer to the newly established Erivan Governorate in 1849. The new governorate in addition to Nakhichevan also included the uezds of Erivan, Alexandropol, Nor Bayazet and Ordubad, however, the latter was later abolished in 1868 and incorporated into the south of the Nakhichevan and Zangezur uezds, the latter continuing to border Nakhichevan from the east. Not long after, further administrative reforms resulted in the separation of the northern part of the Nakhichevan uezd corresponding to the present-day Sharur District of Azerbaijan and the Vayots Dzor Province of Armenia to form the Sharur-Daralayaz uezd in 1870—bordering Nakhichevan from the north.

On 3 March 1918, in accordance with the Treaty of Brest-Litovsk the Russian SFSR ceded the Kars and Batum oblasts to the Ottoman Empire who had been unreconciled with its loss of those territories (which they referred to as Elviye-i Selase) since 1878. Despite the resistance of the Transcaucasian Democratic Federative Republic which had initially rejected the Brest-Litovsk treaty, the Ottoman Third Army was successful in occupying the oblasts, and going on to expand into the western districts of the Erivan and Tiflis governorates, including the Nakhichevan uezd. These additional territorial gains were confirmed through the Treaty of Batum with the individual South Caucasus republics.

=== Republic of Aras ===
Flag of the Republic of Aras.

As stipulated in the Mudros Armistice, the Ottoman Empire was compelled to withdraw its armies from the Erivan and Tiflis governorates, thus withdrawing to the Treaty of Brest-Litovsk boundaries. One of the commanders of the occupying army, Yukub Shevki, sponsored the creation of the Republic of Aras in the occupied Erivan districts, providing it with moral support, weapons, and instructors.

Following the conclusion of the 2-week Armeno-Georgian war, Armenia repositioned its forces to annex the Republic of Aras, however, their advance into the district was halted on 18 January 1919 by Captain F. E. Laughton who established a local British military governorship in the district. On 26 January 1919, the governorship was confirmed by the British military headquarters based in Tiflis (present-day Tbilisi) as a means to prevent ethnic clashes between Armenian soldiers and local Muslims of up to "ten thousand well-armed men".

The British sympathy to the Aras Republic was later reversed when Major-General William M. Thomson became the highest-ranking officer in the South Caucasus—believing that Pan-Turkism was influential in the region, especially in consideration of the presence of Azerbaijani and Ottoman agents Samed Bey and Colonel Halil Bey, respectively. Thomson believed that they were scheming to "forge a bridge between the Ottoman Empire and Azerbaijan and ultimately between Nationalist Turkey and Soviet Russia." Following the British announcement of the dissolution of the governorship and the plans to annex the region to Armenia, Gevorg Varshamyan was selected to become the first governor of the district.

Armenia's formal annexation of Nakhichevan was officially declared on 3 May 1919, after which Armenian forces commanded by Drastamat Kanayan and accompanied by British representative General K. M. Davie advanced southward into the district along the railway. When the force had reached Davalu (present-day Ararat), Thomson ordered them to stop, believing that Armenia was encouraging the defiance of Zangezur in refusing to submit to British–Azerbaijani authority in a "severe breach of faith". The restriction Thomson had placed was later revoked after acting prime minister Alexander Khatisian met him in Tiflis to assure him that the Armenians of Zangezur were acting independently of the Armenian government. On 13 May 1919, when Armenian forces had advanced to Bashnorashen (present-day Sharur), Khatisian arrived in Nakhichevan and met the minister of war of the Aras Republic, Kalb Ali Khan Nakhichevansky, after which the Aras Republic effectively capitulated.

=== Anti-Armenian uprising ===
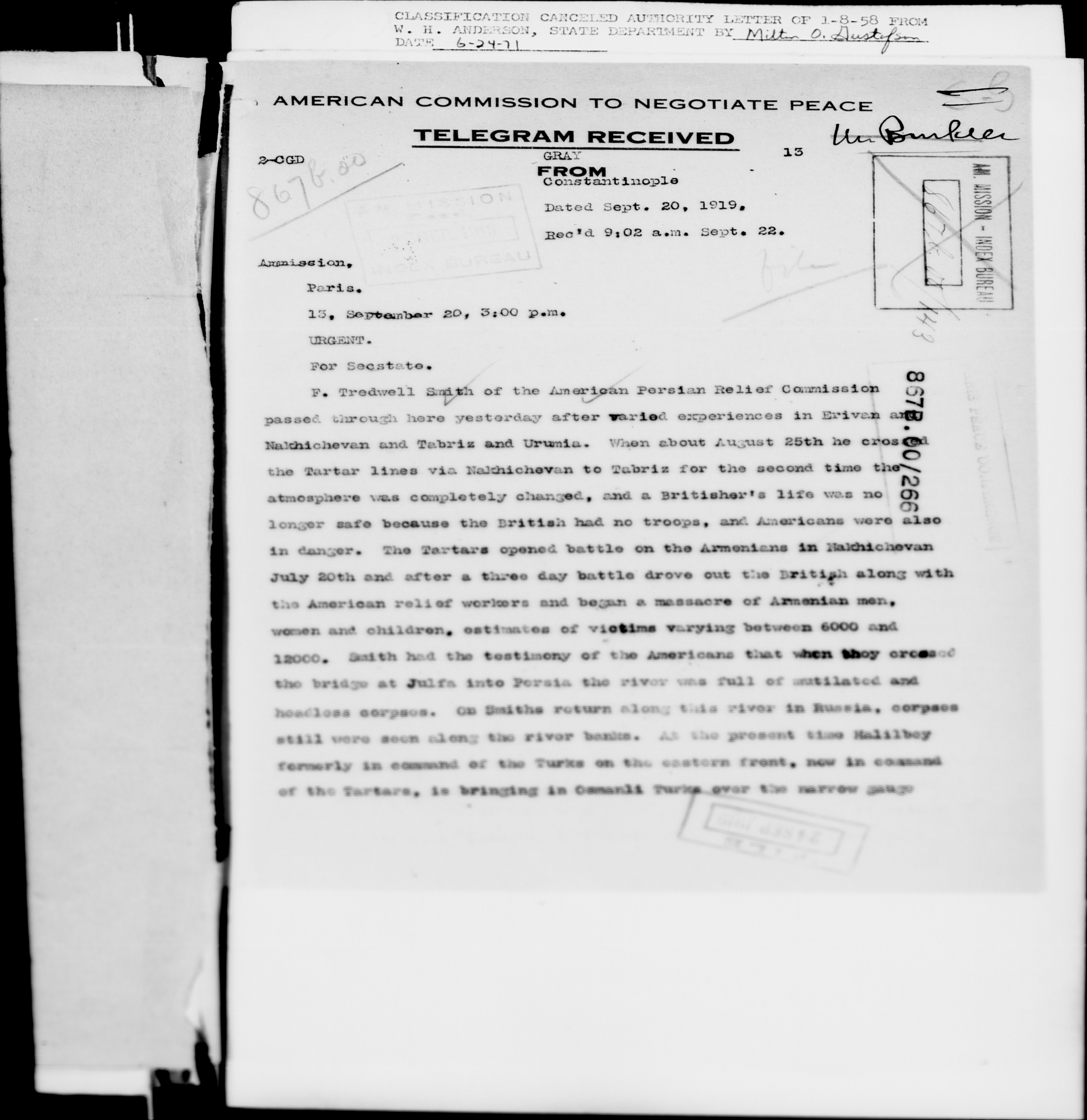
American Commission to Negotiate Peace telegram describing massacres around Nakhichevan.

Despite the apparent defeat of the Ottoman Empire, agents of the Turkish National Movement were reported to be fostering rebellion amongst the Muslims of Nakhichevan, eventually culminating in a large-scale anti-Armenian uprising in July 1919. Fearing retaliation by the Volunteer Army, Azerbaijan did not openly intervene to assist the Nakhichevan rebels, however, on 14 July they provided covert assistance. On 20 July, a pogrom began against the Armenian inhabitants of the city of Nakhichevan—within a few days, the Armenian administration was completely ousted and its Armenian inhabitants expelled. As the uprising spread throughout the Nakhichevan uezd, Armenians in Jugha (present-day Gülüstan) were forced to escape across the Aras river into Iran. Some 6,000 Armenians from Nakhichevan living in the Ararat Valley managed to escape to Daralayaz, Nor Bayazet, and Zangezur (present-day Vayots Dzor, Gegharkunik and Syunik provinces, respectively). During the uprising, Halil Bey coordinated the destruction of 45 Armenian villages and the massacre of 10,000 of their inhabitants, including the destruction of the large Armenian town of Agulis (present-day Yuxarı Əylis) and its 1,400 inhabitants. In late 1919, Samed Bey complained to the Azerbaijani government about the presence of Iranian agents trying to bring refugees from Nakhichevan into Iran.

Some months after the Sovietization of Azerbaijan on 18 June 1920, Armenia issued an ultimatum to the rebels of Zangibasar (present-day Masis) some 15 kilometers southwest of Yerevan to submit to Armenian rule. Not expecting that the ultimatum would be answered, the Armenian army launched an offensive to recapture the rebelling districts on 19 June. In the fight for Zangibasar, Lieutenant Aram Kajaznuni, the son of the first prime minister of Armenia was killed, however, the Armenians won the battle on 21 June, with the local Muslims consisting mainly of Tatars (Note: Later known as Azerbaijanis.) fleeing to Aralikh (present-day Aralık) in the neighbouring Surmalu uezd to avoid retribution. After the battle, volunteer detachments consisting of Armenian refugees from the Aresh and Nukha uezds of Azerbaijan looted the abandoned homes.

The militarists in the Armenian government were strengthened by the success in Zangibasar, hence, they prepared to move against the rebels of Vedibasar (present-day southern Ararat Province) and Nakhichevan; the advance into the former began on 11 July and by the next day, Armenian forces had captured the district and reached the boundary of the Erivan and Sharur-Daralayaz uezds at the mountain pass known as Volchi vorota (Russian: Волчьи ворота, lit. 'Wolf gate') and the local Muslims fled into Sharur. On 14 July, the Armenian advance continued through Volchi vorota into the Sharur district, capturing it 2 days later whilst the locals fled across the Aras river into Iran. Before the Armenians could advance into the Nakhchevan uezd proper, the national council (Azerbaijani: milli şura) of Nakhichevan appealed for peace, however, the negotiations only served in delaying Armenia's advance, after which Şahtaxtı some 40 kilometres (25 miles) northwest of the city of Nakhichevan was captured. By this time, the 11th Army of Soviet Russia (which had previously invaded Azerbaijan) occupied southern Nakhichevan with the aim of linking with Kemalist Turkey. Colonel V. Tarkhov, the commander of the "united troops of Soviet Russia and Red Turkey in Nakhichevan", addressed the Armenians in Shahtaght, proclaiming Soviet control over the rest of the district, thus putting an end to the Armenian campaign.

During the Turkish–Armenian War beginning in September 1920, Armenia for the third time in six years was invaded by Turkish forces; this time under the command of General Kâzım Karabekir. The outcome of the war was Armenia's formal loss of Nakhichevan as the district became an autonomous protectorate of Soviet Azerbaijan, as confirmed by the treaties of Kars and Moscow in 1921. The Nakhichevan uezd was combined with the Sharur subdistrict of the Sharur-Daralayaz uezd and organized into the Nakhichevan ASSR. The south-easternmost parts of the uezd, Karchevan and part of the Zaritap Municipality (part of the Syunik and Vayots Dzor provinces, respectively), were transferred to Soviet Armenia in 1929–1934 whilst within the Transcaucasian SFSR.

== Demographics ==
According to the Russian Empire Census, the Nakhichevan uezd had a population of 100,771 on 28 January [O.S. 15 January] 1897, including 52,984 men and 47,787 women. The majority of the population indicated Tatar (Note: Before 1918, Azerbaijanis were generally known as "Tatars". This term, employed by the Russians, referred to Turkic-speaking Muslims of the South Caucasus. After 1918, with the establishment of the Azerbaijan Democratic Republic and "especially during the Soviet era", the Tatar group identified itself as "Azerbaijani".) to be their mother tongue, with a significant Armenian speaking minority:

Linguistic composition of the Nakhichevan uezd in 1897
| Language | Native speakers | % |
|---|---|---|
| Tatar | 64,151 | 63.66 |
| Armenian | 34,672 | 34.41 |
| Russian | 858 | 0.85 |
| Kurdish | 639 | 0.63 |
| Polish | 154 | 0.15 |
| Ukrainian | 152 | 0.15 |
| Georgian | 42 | 0.04 |
| Greek | 18 | 0.02 |
| Persian | 16 | 0.02 |
| Assyrian | 9 | 0.01 |
| German | 9 | 0.01 |
| Belarusian | 4 | 0.00 |
| Jewish | 4 | 0.00 |
| Other | 43 | 0.04 |
| TOTAL | 100,771 | 100.00 |

According to the 1917 publication of Kavkazskiy kalendar, the Nakhichevan uezd had a population of 136,859 on 14 January [O.S. 1 January] 1916, including 74,081 men and 62,778 women, 133,343 of whom were the permanent population, and 3,516 were temporary residents:

| Nationality | Urban | | Rural | | TOTAL | |
| Nationality | Number | % | Number | % | Number | % |
|---|---|---|---|---|---|---|
| Shia Muslims | 11,475 | 78.32 | 69,716 | 57.05 | 81,191 | 59.32 |
| Armenians | 2,844 | 19.41 | 51,365 | 42.03 | 54,209 | 39.61 |
| Russians | 233 | 1.59 | 471 | 0.39 | 704 | 0.51 |
| Kurds | 0 | 0.00 | 517 | 0.42 | 517 | 0.38 |
| Georgians | 72 | 0.49 | 96 | 0.08 | 168 | 0.12 |
| Other Europeans | 14 | 0.10 | 43 | 0.04 | 57 | 0.04 |
| Asiatic Christians | 7 | 0.05 | 0 | 0.00 | 7 | 0.01 |
| North Caucasians | 6 | 0.04 | 0 | 0.00 | 6 | 0.00 |
| TOTAL | 14,651 | 100.00 | 122,208 | 100.00 | 136,859 | 100.00 |

== Settlements ==
According to the 1897 census, there were 67 settlements in the Nakhichevan uezd with a population over 500 inhabitants. The religious composition of the settlements was as follows:

| Name | Armenian Apostolic | Muslim | Eastern Orthodox | Male | Female | TOTAL |
|---|---|---|---|---|---|---|
| Əbrəqunus (Абракунис, Abrakunis) | 804 | | | 395 | 412 | 807 |
| Aza (Аза Верхняя, Aza Verkhnyaya) | 692 | | | 341 | 382 | 723 |
| Çalxanqala (Азнабюрт, Aznabyurt) | 1,354 | 334 | | 876 | 814 | 1,690 |
| Yuxarı Əylis (Акулис Верхний (Армянский), Akulis Verkhniy (Armyanskiy)) | 1,325 | | | 550 | 782 | 1,332 |
| absorbed by Yuxarı Əylis (Акулис Верхний (Татарский), Akulis Verkhniy (Tatarskiy)) | | 639 | | 313 | 326 | 639 |
| Aşağı Əylis (Акулис Нижний, Akulis Nizhniy) | 649 | | | 261 | 391 | 652 |
| unknown (Алиабаш, Aliabash) | 507 | | | 259 | 248 | 507 |
| Ərəfsə (Аравса, Aravsa) | | 614 | | 335 | 279 | 614 |
| Ərəzin (Аразин, Arazin) | 172 | 418 | | 303 | 287 | 590 |
| Badamlı (Бадамлу (Мазоп), Badamlu (Mazop)) | 761 | 252 | | 526 | 487 | 1,013 |
| Bənəniyar (Бананиар, Bananiar) | | 688 | | 370 | 318 | 688 |
| Biləv (Биляв, Bilyav) | | 865 | | 433 | 432 | 865 |
| Bist (Бист) | 526 | 544 | | 683 | 387 | 1,070 |
| Bulqan (Булган, Bulgan) | | 862 | | 462 | 402 | 864 |
| Vənənd (Вананд, Vanand) | | 988 | | 501 | 487 | 988 |
| Gömür (Гемур, Gemur) | 904 | | | 427 | 477 | 904 |
| Ağbulaq (Гиджазур, Gidzhazur) | 628 | | | 295 | 333 | 628 |
| abandoned (Горадиз, Goradiz) | 697 | | | 307 | 396 | 703 |
| Kültəpə (Гюльтапа, Gyultapa) | 506 | | | 260 | 255 | 515 |
| Dırnıs (Дернис, Dernis) | | 499 | | 303 | 196 | 499 |
| Cəhri (Джагры (Джаук), Dzhagry (Dzhauk)) | 996 | 2,352 | | 1,680 | 1,674 | 3,354 |
| Camaldın (Джамалдин, Dzhamaldin) | | 690 | | 369 | 325 | 694 |
| Gülüstan (Джульф (Джульфы, Джуга), Dzhulf (Dzhulfy, Dzhuga)) | 751 | | | 389 | 374 | 763 |
| abandoned (Дигин-Алмалу, Digin-Almalu) | 737 | | | 383 | 368 | 751 |
| Dəstə (Доста, Dosta) | | 1,863 | | 981 | 882 | 1,863 |
| Zeynəddin (Зайнадин, Zaynadun) | | 724 | | 407 | 317 | 724 |
| Qahab (Кагаб, Kagab) | | 615 | | 358 | 257 | 615 |
| Qazançı (Казанчи, Kazanchi) | 1,057 | | | 541 | 545 | 1,086 |
| Qarabağlar (Карабагляр, Karabaglyar) | | 1,711 | | 949 | 762 | 1,711 |
| absorbed by Nakhchivan (Караханбеклу, Karakhanbeklu) | 639 | | | 310 | 329 | 639 |
| Qaraçuq (Карачуг, Karachug) | | 994 | | 552 | 442 | 994 |
| Karchevan (Карчеван) | 489 | | | 225 | 264 | 489 |
| Kolanı (Кёлани-Кишляг, Kyolani-Kishlyag) | | 545 | | 297 | 248 | 545 |
| Qıvraq (Кивраф, Kivraf) | | 1,281 | | 697 | 584 | 1,281 |
| Kırna (Кирна, Kirna) | | 549 | | 303 | 247 | 550 |
| Güznüt (Кузнут, Kuznut) | 1,445 | | | 700 | 777 | 1,477 |
| Kükü (Кюки, Kyuki) | | 568 | | 299 | 269 | 568 |
| Külüs (Кюлус, Kyulus) | | 515 | | 315 | 200 | 515 |
| Nahajir (Нагаджир, Nagadzhir) | | 499 | | 260 | 239 | 499 |
| Nəsirvaz (Насырвах (Мисирван), Nasyrvakh (Misirvan)) | 288 | 253 | | 283 | 258 | 541 |
| Nakhchivan (Нахичевань, Nakhichevan) | 2,259 | 6,170 | | 4,666 | 4,124 | 8,790 |
| Nehrəm (Неграм, Negram) | | 2,662 | | 1,457 | 1,206 | 2,663 |
| Göydərə (Норашен, Norashen) | 314 | 588 | | 482 | 421 | 903 |
| Nursu (Норс, Nors) | 953 | | | 487 | 466 | 953 |
| Ordubad (Ордубат, Ordubat) | | 4,091 | | 2,458 | 2,153 | 4,611 |
| Parağa (Парага, Paraga) | 800 | 135 | | 417 | 518 | 935 |
| unknown (Парадашт, Paradasht) | 692 | | | 330 | 362 | 692 |
| Saltaq (Салтах, Saltakh) | | 669 | | 379 | 290 | 669 |
| Bardzruni (Султан-бек, Sultan-bek) | 809 | | | 397 | 412 | 809 |
| Sirab (Сураб, Surab) | | 907 | | 532 | 375 | 907 |
| Babek (Тазакенд, Tazakend) | 1,486 | 385 | | 879 | 992 | 1,871 |
| Tivi (Тива, Tiva) | | 766 | | 446 | 320 | 766 |
| Türkeş (Тикеш, Tikesh) | | 488 | | 293 | 195 | 488 |
| Tumbul (Тумбул) | 484 | 373 | | 391 | 467 | 858 |
| Üstüpü (Уступи, Ustupi) | | 1,131 | | 630 | 501 | 1,131 |
| Xanəgah (Ханага, Khanaga) | | 591 | | 310 | 281 | 591 |
| abandoned (Хачапарах, Khachaparakh) | | 535 | | 316 | 219 | 535 |
| Xok (Хок, Khok) | | 1,228 | | 723 | 505 | 1,228 |
| Çənnəb (Чананаб (Цгна), Chananab (Tsgna)) | | | 803 | 337 | 471 | 808 |
| Şahbuz (Шахбуз, Shakhbuz) | | 804 | | 453 | 351 | 804 |
| Şahtaxtı (Шахтахты, Shakhtakhty) | | 1,427 | | 731 | 726 | 1,457 |
| Şıxmahmud (Шихмахмуд, Shikhmakhmud) | 746 | | | 398 | 380 | 778 |
| Şurud (Шурут, Shurut) | 723 | 116 | | 406 | 433 | 839 |
| Güney Qışlaq (Юхари Ирамешин, Yukhari Irameshin) | | 570 | | 327 | 243 | 570 |
| Yaycı (Яйджи, Yaydzhi) | | 2,112 | | 1,156 | 958 | 2,114 |
| Yamxana (Ямхана, Yamkhana) | 656 | | | 325 | 360 | 685 |
| Yarımca (Яримджа, Yarimdzha) | 633 | | | 352 | 312 | 664 |
| TOTAL | 26,482 | 45,610 | 803 | 38,576 | 35,493 | 74,069 |

== Bibliography ==
- Bournoutian, George A. (1992). The Khanate of Erevan Under Qajar Rule, 1795-1828. Costa Mesa: Mazda Publishers. ISBN 9780939214181.
- Bournoutian, George A. (2018). Armenia and Imperial Decline: The Yerevan Province, 1900–1914. Milton Park, Abingdon, Oxon: Routledge. ISBN 978-1-351-06260-2. OCLC 1037283914.
- de Waal, Thomas (2015). Great Catastrophe: Armenians and Turks in the Shadow of Genocide. Oxford. ISBN 978-0-19-935070-4. OCLC 897378977.
- "Հայաստանի զորքերը գրավում են Զանգիբասարը [այսօր՝ Մասիս]․ 23 հունիս, 1920" [Armenian forces capture Zangibasar (now Masis): 23 June 1920]. ANI Armenian Research Center (in Armenian). 23 June 2021. Archived from the original on 20 October 2022.
- Hovannisian, Richard G. (1971). The Republic of Armenia. Vol. 1: The First Year, 1918–1919. Berkeley: University of California Press. ISBN 978-0520019843.
- Hovannisian, Richard G. (1982). The Republic of Armenia. Vol. 2: From Versailles to London, 1919–1920. Berkeley: University of California Press. ISBN 978-0520041868.
- Hovannisian, Richard G. (1996a). The Republic of Armenia. Vol. 3: From London to Sèvres, February–August 1920. Berkeley: University of California Press. ISBN 978-0520088030.
- Кавказский календарь на 1913 год [Caucasian calendar for 1913] (in Russian) (68th ed.). Tiflis: Tipografiya kantselyarii Ye.I.V. na Kavkaze, kazenny dom. 1913. Archived from the original on 19 April 2022.
- Кавказский календарь на 1917 год [Caucasian calendar for 1917] (in Russian) (72nd ed.). Tiflis: Tipografiya kantselyarii Ye.I.V. na Kavkaze, kazenny dom. 1917. Archived from the original on 4 November 2021.
- Khatisian, Alexander (16 March 2020). "9. The expansion of the borders of Armenia and the 1919 the act of May 28". Հայաստանի Հանրապետության ծագումն ու զարգացումը [Origin and development of the Republic of Armenia] (in Armenian) – via ANI Armenian Research Center.
- Tsutsiev, Arthur (2014). Atlas of the Ethno-Political History of the Caucasus (PDF). Translated by Nora Seligman Favorov. New Haven: Yale University Press. ISBN 9780300153088. Archived (PDF) from the original on 17 June 2023.
- Jamalova Nigar. Armenia’s plans on the Nakhchivan territory and the countermeasures of the Azerbaijan government (1918-1920). "Azərbaycan Tarixşünaslığı" jurnalı / Journal of "Azerbaijan Historiography". 2024/6.
