= Armenians in Nakhchivan =

Ethnic group in Azerbaijan

Total population
- 0

Regions with significant populations
- Nakhchivan

Languages
- Armenian

Religion
- Armenian Apostolic Church

Related ethnic groups
- Armenians in Azerbaijan, Armenians in Baku

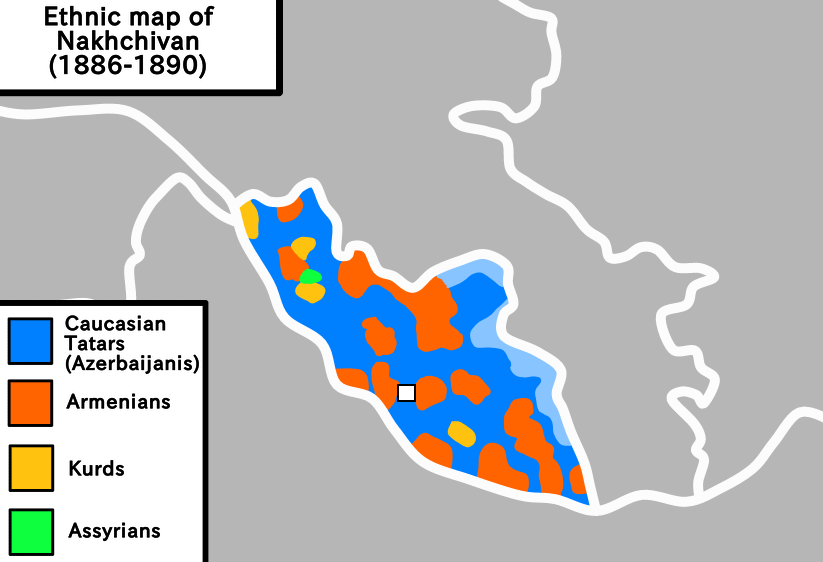
Ethnic map of Nakhichevan in 1886-1890.

Armenians had a historic presence in Nakhchivan (Armenian: Նախիջևան, Armenian pronunciation: [nɑχidʒɛvɑn]). According to an Armenian tradition, Nakhchivan was founded by Noah, of the Abrahamic religions. Following the transfer of the region to the Azerbaijani SSR, the region observed a significant demographic shift.

Amid anti-Armenian sentiment and policies in Azerbaijan, the Armenian population gradually decreased to around 0%. Still some Armenian political groupings of Armenia and the Armenian diaspora, claim that Nakhchivan should belong to Armenia. The Medieval Armenian cemetery of Jugha (Julfa) in Nakhchivan, regarded by Armenians as the biggest and most precious repository of medieval headstones marked with Christian crosses – khachkars (of which more than 2,000 were still there in the late 1980s), was completely demolished by 2006 by Azerbaijan.

== History ==
=== 6th century BC to 4th century AD ===
Nakhchivan became part of the Satrapy of Armenia under Achaemenid Persia c. 521 BC. In 189 BC, Nakhchivan was part of the new Kingdom of Armenia established by Artaxias I. The area's status as a major trade center allowed it to prosper, though because of this, it was coveted by many foreign powers. According to historian Faustus of Byzantium (4th century), when the Sassanid Persians invaded Armenia, Sassanid King Shapur II (310-380) removed 2,000 Armenian and 16,000 Jewish families in 360-370.

=== 5th to 18th century ===
In 428, the Armenian Arshakuni monarchy was abolished and Nakhchivan was annexed by Sassanid Persia. In 623 AD, possession of the region passed to the Byzantine Empire. Nakhchivan itself became part of the autonomous Principality of Armenia under Arab control. After the fall of the Arab rule in the 9th century, the area became the domain of several Muslim emirates of Arran and Azerbaijan. Nakhchivan became part of the Seljuk Empire in the 11th century, followed by becoming the capital of the Atabegs of Azerbaijan in the 12th century. In the 1220s it was plundered by Khwarezmians and Mongols. In the 15th century, the weakening Mongol rule in Nakhchivan was forced out by the Turcoman dynasties of Kara Koyunlu and Ak Koyunlu.

In the 16th century, control of Nakhchivan passed to the Safavid dynasty of Persia. Because of its geographic position, it frequently suffered during the wars between Persia and the Ottoman Empire in the 14th to 18th centuries. In 1604, Shah Abbas I Safavi, concerned that the lands of Nakhchivan and the surrounding areas would pass into Ottoman hands, decided to institute a scorched earth policy. He forced the entire local population, Armenians, Jews and Muslims alike, to leave their homes and move to the Persian provinces south of the Aras River. Many of the deportees were settled in the neighborhood of Isfahan that was named New Julfa since most of the residents were from the original Julfa (a predominantly Armenian town).

In the 14th and 15th centuries, residents of 28 Armenian settlements in Nakhchivan converted to Roman Catholicism influenced by preachings of a Dominican priest from Bologna named Bartholomew. Services in the Armenian language were delivered to them by Dominican priests for at least the next 350 years. At the time of the French traveller Jean Chardin's visit to Nakhchivan in the 1670s, only 8 of the original 28 villages remained loyal to Catholicism, and the rest had returned to the jurisdiction of the Armenian patriarch due to "heavy impositions upon them" with the remaining Catholics "not likely to hold out long." The largest of the remaining Catholic villages was Abrener. Indeed there was no mention of Catholics in Nakhchivan in the 1897 Russian Imperial census.

=== 19th century to early 1920 ===
After the last Russo-Persian War and the Treaty of Turkmenchay, the Nakhchivan khanate passed into Russian possession in 1828. Aleksandr Griboyedov, the Russian envoy to Persia, stated that by the time Nakhchivan came under Russian rule, only 17% of its residents were Armenians, while the remainder of the population (83%) were Muslims. After the resettlement initiative which encouraged massive Armenian immigration in the South Caucasus from the Ottoman Empire and Iran, the number of Armenians had increased to 45% while Muslims remained the majority at 55%. Armenian migrants mainly arrived to Nakhchivan from Urmia, Khoy and Salmas. With a dramatic increase in the Armenian and Muslim population, Griboyedov noted friction arising between them. The Nakhchivan khanate was dissolved in 1828, its territory was merged with the territory of the Erivan khanate and the area became the Nakhichevan uezd of the newly-formed Armenian oblast, which later became the Erivan Governorate in 1849. According to official statistics of the Russian Empire, by the turn of the 20th century Azerbaijanis made up 57% of the uyezd's population, while Armenians constituted 42%. At the same time in the Sharur-Daralayaz uezd, the territory of which would form the northern part of modern-day Nakhchivan, Azeris constituted 70.5% of the population, while Armenians made up 27.5%.

During the Russian Revolution of 1905, conflict erupted between the Armenians and the Azeris, culminating in the Armenian-Tatar massacres. In the final year of World War I, Nakhchivan was the scene of more bloodshed between Armenians and Azerbaijanis, who both laid claim to the area. By 1914, the Armenian population was at 40% while the Azeri population increased to roughly 60%. After the February Revolution, the region was under the authority of the Special Transcaucasian Committee of the Russian Provisional Government and subsequently of the short-lived Transcaucasian Democratic Federative Republic. When the TDFR was dissolved in May 1918, Nakhchivan, Nagorno-Karabakh, Zangezur (today the Armenian province of Syunik), and Qazakh were heavily contested between the newly formed and short-lived states of the First Republic of Armenia and the Azerbaijan Democratic Republic (ADR). In June 1918, the region came under Ottoman occupation. Under the terms of the Armistice of Mudros, the Ottomans agreed to pull their troops out of the Transcaucasus to make way for the forthcoming British military presence.

Under British occupation, Sir John Oliver Wardrop, British Chief Commissioner in the South Caucasus, made a border proposal to solve the conflict. According to Wardrop, Armenian claims against Azerbaijan should not go beyond the administrative borders of the former Erivan Governorate (which under prior Imperial Russian rule encompassed Nakhchivan), while Azerbaijan was to be limited to the governorates of Baku and Elisabethpol. This proposal was rejected by both Armenians (who did not wish to give up their claims to Qazakh, Zangezur and Karabakh) and Azeris (who found it unacceptable to give up their claims to Nakhchivan). As disputes between both countries continued, it soon became apparent that the fragile peace under British occupation would not last. In December 1918, with the support of Azerbaijan's Musavat Party, Jafargulu Khan Nakhchivanski declared the Republic of Aras in the Nakhchivan uezd of the former Erivan Governorate assigned to Armenia by Wardrop. The Armenian government did not recognize the new state and sent its troops into the region to take control of it. The conflict soon erupted into the violent Aras War.

Armenian population of Nakhichevan
Year	Armenians	%	TOTAL
1828	1,632	44.7	3,656
1831	▲13,342	43.7	30,507
1896	▲36,671	42.2	86,878
1897	▼34,672	34.4	100,771
1916	▲53,900	40	135,000
1926	▼11,276	10.8	104,656
1939	▲13,350	10.5	126,696
1959	▼9,519	6.7	141,361
1970	▼5,828	2.9	202,187
1979	▼3,406	1.4	240,459
1989	▼1,858	0.6	293,875
1999	▼17	0	354,072

By mid-June 1919, however, Armenia succeeded in establishing control over Nakhchivan and the whole territory of the self-proclaimed republic. The fall of the Aras republic triggered an invasion by the regular Azerbaijani army and by the end of July, Armenian troops were forced to leave Nakhchivan city to the Azerbaijanis amidst the Muslim uprisings in Kars and Sharur–Nakhichevan. Again, more violence erupted leaving some ten thousand Armenians dead and forty-five Armenian villages destroyed. Meanwhile, feeling the situation to be hopeless and unable to maintain any control over the area, the British decided to withdraw from the region in mid-1919. Still, fighting between Armenians and Azeris continued and after a series of skirmishes that took place throughout the Nakhchivan district, a cease-fire agreement was concluded. However, the cease-fire lasted only briefly, and by early March 1920, more fighting broke out, primarily in Karabakh between Karabakh Armenians and Azerbaijan's regular army. This triggered conflicts in other areas with mixed populations, including Nakhchivan. In mid-March 1920, Armenian forces launched an offensive on all of the disputed territories, and by the end of the month both the Nakhchivan and Zangezur regions came under stable but temporary Armenian control.

=== 1920 to present ===
In July 1920, the 11th Soviet Red Army invaded and occupied the region and on July 28, declared the Nakhchivan Autonomous Soviet Socialist Republic with "close ties" to the Azerbaijan SSR. A referendum was called for the people of Nakhchivan to be consulted. According to the formal figures of this referendum, held at the beginning of 1921, 90% of Nakhchivan's population wanted to be included in the Azerbaijan SSR "with the rights of an autonomous republic. The decision to make Nakhchivan a part of modern-day Azerbaijan was cemented March 16, 1921, in the Treaty of Moscow between Bolshevist Russia and Turkey. The agreement between the Soviet Russia and Turkey also called for attachment of the former Sharur-Daralayaz uezd (which had an Azerbaijani majority) to Nakhchivan, thus allowing Turkey to share a border with the Azerbaijan SSR. This deal was reaffirmed on 23 October in the Treaty of Kars.

During the Soviet era, Nakhchivan saw a significant demographic shift. Its Armenian population gradually decreased as many emigrated to the Armenian SSR. In 1926, 11% of region's population was Armenian. Some Armenian-populated locales of Nakhchivan were transferred under Armenia's jurisdiction by 1936, which decreased that number further. By 1979, it shrunk to 1.4%. The Azeri population, meanwhile increased substantially with both a higher birth rate and immigration (going from 85% in 1926 to 96% by 1979). The Armenian population saw a great reduction in their numbers throughout the years repatriating to Armenia.

== Ethnic cleansing ==
The transferal of Nakhichevan from Armenia to Azerbaijan under the 1921 Treaty of Moscow enabled Azerbaijani authorities to gradually carry out ethnic cleansing of Armenians, including forced displacement and destruction of cultural monuments, within the region. Historian Christopher Walker states that Azeri authorities implemented policies aimed to "de-Armenize" the region. Between the 1960s and 1980s, Azeri authorities and locals prevented Armenians from visiting cultural monuments, which prevented future Armenian claims to cultural heritage in the region. The Armenian presence diminished from 1917 and onwards under the control of the Azeri SSR: from 44 villages in 1917 to two villages in 1987, from comprising 40% of the population to less than 2%. That Armenians were a demographic minority in the region was due to their forced deportation under Shah Abbas II in 1604, which according to certain historians, was also a form of ethnic cleansing. The complete elimination of all Armenians and their heritage from has been described in various ways, including "ethnic cleansing", "white genocide" and "Nakhchivanization."

The elimination of the Armenian population from Nakhichevan followed pogroms—sometimes considered an extension of the 1915 Armenian Genocide—carried out against Armenians by Azeri state authorities, Azeri locals, and Ottoman Turkey.

Arif Yunus, an exiled Azerbaijani historian and activist, argues that the Aliyev regime’s "cultural genocide" in Nakhichevan—and its ability to get away with such erasure—serves as a show of force meant to weaken and intimidate domestic opposition.

== Armenian political claims to Nakhchivan ==
Some Armenian political groupings of the Republic of Armenia and the Armenian diaspora, most notably the Armenian Revolutionary Federation (ARF) claim Nakhchivan as part of United Armenia. The ARF programme for example states: The borders of United Armenia shall include all territories designated as Armenia by the Treaty of Sèvres as well as the regions of Nagorno-Karabakh (Artsakh), Javakhk, and Nakhchivan.

However, Nakhchivan is not officially claimed by the government of Armenia. Armenian Foreign Minister Vardan Oskanyan claimed in december of 2006 that as the legal successor to the Armenian SSR, Armenia is loyal to the Treaty of Kars which created the Nakhchivan ASSR as part of the Azerbaijan SSR, however that Turkey's actions call into question the validity of the treaty.

== Destruction of Armenian heritage sites in Nakhchivan ==
Between 1964 and 1987, Nakhchivan-born researcher Argam Aivazian now exiled in Armenia documented 89 Armenian churches, 5,840 Khachkars, and 22,000 tombstones in the area. The area of Julfa, was home to the largest ancient Armenian cemetery in the world, at one time containing 10,000 Khachkars, with the oldest dating back to the 6th century. A report released in the publication Hyperallergic states that all the Armenian heritage documented by Aivazian has been destroyed. Between 1997 and 2006, a total of 89 churches, 5,840 Khachkars and 22,000 tombstones from the Armenian past of Nakhchivan were destroyed by Azerbaijan in Julfa. Footage of the deliberate destruction was released in a short film called The New Tears of Araxes. It depicts Azerbaijani soldiers loading debris into trucks and dumping them into the Araxes river. Many local Azerbaijanis were enraged by the destruction considering the Armenian cemetery part of their cultural history.

The European Parliament have taken an interest in the fate of the cemetery and passed a resolution in February 2006, condemning the destruction of the cemetery, but its delegation has not been allowed to visit the site itself.

== Notable Armenians from Nakhchivan ==
- Hovnatanian (17th–19th centuries), a family of painters originally from Shurut village
- Christapor Mikaelian (1859–1905), one of the three founders of the ARF, born in Agulis village
- Stepan Sapah-Gulian (1861–1928), intellectual and leader of Social Democrat Hunchakian Party born in Djahri village
- Manuk Abeghian (1865–1944), scholar of literature and folklore, born in Astabad village
- Stepan Zorian (1867–1919), one of the three founders of the ARF, born in Tsghna village
- Hasmik (Taguhi Hakobyan, 1878-1947) born in Nakhichevan city
- Garegin Nzhdeh (1886–1955), military commander, statesman, born in Kznut village
- Yakov Davydov (1888–1938), Soviet official, born in Verin Agulis
- Vladimir Sargsyan (1935–2013), mathematician
- Argam Aivazian (b. 1947), historian and researcher, born in Arinj village
- Aghvan Vardanyan (b. 1958), ARF politician, born in Gömür village
- Umid Imamyan (b. 1947), ARF politician, born in Arinj village

== See also ==
- Armenian cultural heritage in Azerbaijan
- Armenians in Azerbaijan
- Nader Shah's decree to the merchants of Agulis
- Muslim uprisings in Kars and Sharur–Nakhichevan
- Nakhchivan Autonomous Republic
- Nakhichevan uezd
