= Isa Musayev =

Azerbaijani theater actor and director (1912–1976)

- Born: 27 October 1912 (age 112); Nakhchivan, Nakhichevansky Uyezd, Erivan Governorate, Russian Empire
- Died: 8 February 1976 (aged 63); Nakhchivan Nakhichevan ASSR, Azerbaijan SSR, USSR
- Education: Baku Theater School
- Occupation(s): theater actor and director
- Years active: 1929–1976
- Awards: People's Artist of the Azerbaijan SSR Honored Artist of the Azerbaijan SSR

Isa Hasan oghlu Musayev (Azerbaijani: İsa Həsən oğlu Musayev, 27 November 1912 – 8 February 1976) was an Azerbaijani theater actor, director, People's Artist of the Azerbaijan SSR.

== Biography ==
Isa Musayev was born on 27 November 1912 in Nakhchivan. He entered the Nakhchivan Pedagogical College, but left his education unfinished in 1927 and came to Baku, where he studied at the Baku Theater School named after Mirza Fatali Akhundov. After graduating, he returned to Nakhchivan and began working in the theater.

Isa Musayev for the first time in the theater played the role of Sabir in the play "Sabir's trial" directed by Samad Movlavi. In 1930–1940 and 1943–1976, he was one of the leading actors of the Nakhchivan State Musical Dramatic Theatre. In 1940–1943 he worked as an actor and director at the Guba State Drama Theater named after Abbasgulu Bakikhanov. He had been a member of the CPSU since 1942.

Isa Musayev died on 8 February 1976 in Nakhchivan.

== Awards ==
- People's Artist of the Azerbaijan SSR – 24 May 1960
- Honored Artist of the Azerbaijan SSR – 17 June 1943
- Order of the Badge of Honour

== Literature ==
- Rəhimli, İ. (2017). Azərbaycan Teatr Ensiklopediyası (3 cilddə). Vol. 2-ci cild. Bakı: Azərnəşr. 392 səh. ISBN 978-9952-8021-9-1.
- Ҹ. Б. Гулијев, ed. (1983). Азәрбајҹан Совет Енсиклопедијасы: [10 ҹилддə]. Vol. VII ҹилд (Мисир – Прадо). Бакы: Азәрбајҹан Совет Енсиклопедијасынын Баш Редаксиjасы.
- П. А. Марков, ed. (1964). Театральная энциклопедия: [в 6 т.] Vol. Т. 3. Кетчер — Нежданова. Москва: Советская энциклопедия.
- Rəhimli, İ. (2005). Azərbaycan Teatr Tarixi (dərslik). Bakı: Çaşıoğlu. 864 səh.
- Иса Мусајев. Азәрбајҹан Театр Ҹәмијјәти. Бакы: «Ишыг» нәшријјаты. 2005. 864 səh.
