= Arazin =

Arazin may refer to:

- Ərəzin, Azerbaijan
- Arazin, Iran
