= Church of Mijin Ankuzik (Anzur) =

Armenian church in Nakhchivan, Azerbaijan

Coordinates: 39.213005°N 45.770186°E

- Church of Mijin Ankuzik
- Location: Orta Anazyr
- Country: Azerbaijan
- Denomination: Armenian Apostolic Church

History
- Status: Destroyed

Architecture
- Demolished: 1997–2009

The Church of Mijin Ankuzik (Orta Anzyr) was an Armenian ruinous church located in the abandoned Mijin Ankuzik (Orta Anzyr) village (Julfa District) of the Nakhchivan Autonomous Republic of Azerbaijan. It was located in the western part of the abandoned village.

== History ==
The church was renovated in the 17th century. It was already in ruins when historian Argam Ayvazyan surveyed it during his fieldwork in Nakhchivan. The ruins of the church were still extant in the late Soviet period; however, the ruins were razed to ground at some point between 1997 and November 11, 2009, as documented by the Caucasus Heritage Watch.
