= Kamran Guliyev =

Kamran Guliyev may refer to:

- Kamran Guliyev (footballer)
- Kamran Guliyev (actor)
