= Kamran Guliyev (actor) =

Kamran Guliyev Kamran Quliyev
- Born: September 9, 1958 (age 67); Zeynaddin, Nakhichevan ASSR, Azerbaijan SSR, USSR
- Education: Azerbaijan State Institute of Arts
- Occupations: actor, film director
- Awards

Kamran Mammadgulu oghlu Guliyev (Azerbaijani: Kamran Məmmədqulu oğlu Quliyev, born September 9, 1958) is an Azerbaijani actor, film director, People's Artiste of Azerbaijan (1999).

== Biography ==
Kamran Guliyev was born on September 9, 1958, in Nakhichevan ASSR. From 1981 to 1986, he studied at the Azerbaijan State Institute of Arts.

He became an actor in Nakhchivan State Musical Dramatic Theatre in 1979. In 1997 he replaced the chief director of the theater. From February 2004 to June 2013, he worked as the director and chief director of the theater, and he has worked in the Ministry of Culture of the Nakhchivan Autonomous Republic.

== Awards ==
- People's Artiste of Azerbaijan — October 9, 1999
- Honored Artist of the Azerbaijan SSR — 1987
- Taraggi Medal — September 25, 2008
