= Shingiley Mosque =

Mosque in Dəstə, Ordubad, Azerbaijan

- Location of the mosque in Azerbaijan

Religion
- Affiliation: Islam

Location
- Location: Dəstə, Ordubad District
- Country: Azerbaijan
- Interactive map of Shingiley Mosque
- Coordinates: 38°53′02″N 45°54′29″E

Architecture
- Completed: 19th century

The Shingiley Mosque is a 19th-century mosque and historical-architectural monument located in the village of Dəstə, Ordubad District, Azerbaijan.

The mosque was included in the list of immovable historical and cultural monuments of local importance by Decision No. 132 of the Cabinet of Azerbaijan dated August 2, 2001. By Decision No. 98 of the Cabinet of Ministers of the Nakhchivan Autonomous Republic dated November 21, 2007, Shingiley Mosque was classified as an architectural monument of national importance.

== About ==
The Shingiley Mosque is located in the village of Dəstə, Ordubad District. According to inscriptions found in the mosque, it was originally built in the 11th century and restored in the 20th century.

The mosque has two entrances, with the main one located on the northern side, where there is also a balcony. There are two arched windows on each of the western and eastern walls, and five windows on the southern wall. The ceiling is supported by six columns. The mosque is 16.6 metres (54 ft) long, 9 metres (30 ft) wide, and 4.3 metres (14 ft) high.

After the Soviet occupation of Azerbaijan, an official campaign against religion began in 1928. In December of that year, the Central Committee of the Communist Party of Azerbaijan transferred many mosques, churches, and synagogues for use as educational clubs. While there were 3,000 mosques in Azerbaijan in 1917, this number dropped to 1,700 in 1927, 1,369 in 1928, and only 17 by 1933. The Shingiley Mosque also ceased functioning during this period.

=== After Independence ===
After Azerbaijan regained its independence, the mosque was included in the list of immovable historical and cultural monuments of local importance by Decision No. 132 of the Cabinet of Ministers of the Republic of Azerbaijan dated August 2, 2001. By Decision No. 98 of the Cabinet of Ministers of the Nakhchivan Autonomous Republic dated November 21, 2007, the Shingiley Mosque was added to the list of architectural monuments of national importance.

== See also ==
- Islam in Azerbaijan
- List of mosques in Azerbaijan
