= Tivi =

Village and municipality in Nakhchivan, Azerbaijan

- Municipality
- Location within Azerbaijan
- Coordinates: 39°07′28″N 45°53′29″E
- Country: Azerbaijan
- Autonomous republic: Nakhchivan
- District: Ordubad

Population (2005)
  - Total: 1,347
- Time zone: UTC+4 (AZT)

Tivi is a village and municipality in the Ordubad District of Nakhchivan, Azerbaijan. It is located in near the Ordubad-Bist highway, 60 km north-east of the district center.

Its population works in gardening, farming, beekeeping and animal husbandry. There is a secondary school, library, club and a medical center in the village. It has a population of 1,347.

The paradise of mountains, Tivi is rich in water resources. Here, there are the interesting monuments of the Bronze and ancient ages (the necropolis and settlement). Gamigaya drawings are in the north-east of the Tivi village.

== Etymology ==
The name of the village is related to the local mineral springs of the same name, used by the local population for the purpose of treatment. At the toponomy, tibi, tivi, tube, tupu used in meaning "swamp", "lake", "the place filled with water". The tupu variant of this geographical name, can be found at the name of the Ustupu village in the territory of the district.

== Tivi Necropolis ==
Tivi Necropolis is the archaeological monument of the ancient period, near of the Tivi village of Ordubad region. It was registered in 1968. Its area is about 2 hectares. It consists of the stone box-type graves. The graves are rectangular, has been directed from north to south, from west to east; its side walls built with sculpted rough stones, and floor with two or three large stone slabs. Some parts of the graves were destroyed by result erosion, while others during the farm works. The found materials consists of simple clay pots, and the bronze ring typical of the antique period, various earrings, and beads made of agate. According to the findings, the monument belongs to the 3rd–2nd centuries BC.

== Monuments ==
There was an Armenian church, Church of Shrju, located some 2 km north-east to the village, in the southeastern part of the abandoned village of Shrju. The church was destroyed at some point between 1997 and June 15, 2006.

St. Stepanos Monastery was an Armenian monastery founded in 11–12th centuries and was located some 2 km south of the village. The monastery was destroyed at some point between 1997 and June 15, 2006.

== See also ==
- St. Stepanos Monastery (Tivi)
- Church of Shrju
