= Arindzh =

Arindzh or Aryndzh may refer to:

- Arinj, Armenia
- Arınc, Azerbaijan
