= Vincenzo degli Alessandri =

Vincenzo degli Alessandri (fl. 1530 – c. 1595, Venice) was an Italian traveler and diplomat who served the Republic of Venice.

== Biography ==
He was working in Venetian bailo in Constantinople from 1560 to 1570. He was elected to be extraordinary notary of Council of Ten and was sent to Safavid Iran on a secret mission in October 1570. DIsguising himself as a merchant, he was charged with obtaining Safavid alliance to prevent Ottoman invasion of Cyprus. Although he was arrested in Erzerum and escaped Ottoman agents, taking refuge in residence of Nicholas Friton, Bishop of Nakhchivan, he eventually made it to Tabriz in July, 1572.

Arriving in Qazvin around August, he failed to meet Shah Tahmasp, but managed to gain a lot of information about him. He also managed to meet Haydar Mirza Safavi, even accompanied him in a hunt. With unsuccessful result, he returned to Venice and made an oral report to the Senate in September, 1574, which is regarded as harsh and partial according to some researchers. This report on Safavid Iran was later reprinted and shared around Europe many times.

Once in Venice, he resumed his career in chancery, becoming an ordinary notary and obtaining an office for a son as compensation "than he could at any time claim for his trip to Persia". He was sent to Šibenik and Bosnia Eyalet in 1588 to settle border disputes and other controversies with Ferhad Pasha Sokolović. Although exempted from this task due to illness, he negotiated in Venice, on behalf of the Senate, with Bosnian merchants and diplomats in 1589. After February 1595, he requested to be rewarded for his work in the Ottoman Empire and in other parts of the world. His later life is unknown.

== Links ==
- Report of Vincenzo degli Alessandri (in Italian)
