= Arinc =

Arinc may refer to:

- Arınc, Azerbaijan
- ARINC, an American communications company
