= John III of Soltaniyeh =

Archbishop of Soltaniyeh

The Most Reverend John III of Soltaniyeh
- Church: Catholic Church
- Archdiocese: Archdiocese of Soltaniyeh; Archdiocese of Khanbaliq
- Appointed: 9 May 1398
- Predecessor: Francis of Soltaniyeh
- Successor: John IV of Soltaniyeh
- Previous post: Bishop of Nakhchivan (preceded by Johannes de Galonifontibus)

Orders
- Rank: Archbishop

Personal details
- Born: Kastamonu, Beylik of Candar
- Died: c. 1412

John III of Soltaniyeh (Latin: Iohannes Sultaniensis archiepiscopus) was a Dominican friar, diplomat and archbishop of Soltaniyeh, often mistaken for his namesake, Johannes de Galonifontibus, with whom he shared a post - Bishopric of Nakhchivan.

== Early life ==
He was probably born to Paduan Italian merchant family in Kastamone, then ruled by Candar dynasty.

== Career ==
He succeeded Johannes de Galonifontibus as bishop of Nakhchivan in late 14th century, then appointed as Archbishop of Soltaniyeh by Pope Boniface IX on 9 May 1398. He was granted papal bull by Boniface on 19 August 1398 during his visit to Rome on granting indulgences to all Christians who contributed to the restoration of churches destroyed by Timur in Georgia and Armenia and to the ransom of Christians captured and enslaved.

In 1402, after his victory over the Ottoman Turks at the Battle of Ankara, Timur sent Johannes on an embassy to European courts to announce his victory. Timur proposed treaties to facilitate commercial exchanges between European powers and his realm. He also carried a portrait of Timur and a letter from his son Miran Shah. Henry IV of England and Charles VI of France replied by congratulating Timur. During his travels, he visited Martin of Aragon, Robert of the Palatinate, as well as Konrad von Jungingen. Despite Timur's death in 1405, John never returned to his post. In June 1407, John was in Venice, in September 1408 in Pisa, then with a delegation of participants in the Council of Pisa he visited Hungary, where negotiations were held with Sigismund regarding the Papal schism. He was tasked with sending invitations to Manuel II, Prince Mircea the Elder and Alexander the Good. He granted undulgencies in Church of St. Mary, in Kronstadt (now Brașov, Romania). He remained in Pisa after 2 April 1409.

On December 1410, Antipope John XXIII named him as administrator of Archdiocese of Khanbaliq. Latest document by him was dated to 12 February 1412, where granted the indulgencies to visitors of Dominican Church in Lviv.

== Legacy ==
He wrote Timur's biography, as well as Libellus de notitia orbis (Book of the Knowledge of the World), where he described his own travel impressions and information received from other travelers, mainly merchants about Caucasus, Asia Minor, Iran and other regions. A part of his book was published by Anton Kern, the librarian of Graz University. According to Raymond-Joseph Loenertz he spent his last years in Crimea.
