= Johannes de Galonifontibus =

The Most Reverend Jean de Gillefontaine
- Bishop of Nakhchivan
- Church: Catholic Church
- Diocese: Bishopric of Nakhchivan
- Appointed: 1377
- Predecessor: John of Rouen
- Successor: John III of Soltaniyeh

Orders
- Rank: Bishop

Personal details
- Born: Gaillefontaine, France
- Died: c. 1400

Johannes de Galonifontibus (French: Jean de Gillefontaine) was a Dominican friar active in the South Caucasus in March 1377. He was appointed by Gregory XI on 9 March 1377 as Bishop of Nakhchivan. He is often mistaken for Archbishop of Sultaniya, John III of Soltaniyeh who was also a bishop of Nakhchivan because of Anton Kern, who published John III's Libellus de Notitia Orbis and tentatively associated him with his namesake.

== See also ==
- Timurid relations with Europe
