= Paolo Piromalli =

Italian Roman Catholic bishop

Most Reverend Paolo Piromalli
- Bishop of Bisignano
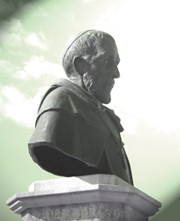
- Church: Catholic Church
- Diocese: Diocese of Bisignano
- In office: 1664–1667
- Predecessor: Carlo Filippo Mei
- Successor: Giuseppe Maria Sebastiani
- Previous post: Archbishop of Nakhchivan (1655–1664)

Personal details
- Died: 12 July 1667

Paolo Piromalli (1591 – 12 July 1667) was an Italian dominican missionary, theologian, orientalist and bishop.

== Biography ==
Paolo Piromalli was born in 1591 at Siderno (Ulterior Calabria). Having embraced the rule of St. Dominic, he devoted himself to preaching, and was in 1628 called to Rome to teach philosophy in the monastery of Santa Maria sopra Minerva. Appointed in 1631 director of the missions of Major Armenia, he succeeded in gaining for the Catholic faith a number of schismatics and Eutychians, among the latter the patriarchs Cyriac and Moyse III. In 1637 he traveled through Georgia, and was twice sent to pacify in Poland the uneasiness caused by the disputes of the Armenians. In 1642 he went to Persia, remaining there ten years, and then preached the Gospel in several parts of India. In 1654 he passed over to Africa, with a view of converting infidels, but was captured by Barbary pirates, who kept him prisoner for fourteen months. Appointed archbishop of Nakhchivan (1655), he governed that Armenian Church to the close of 1664, when he was transferred to the episcopal see of Bisignano, in the kingdom of Naples. He died July 12, 1667, at Bisignano.

== Works ==
- Theanthropologia (Vienna, 1656).
- Apologia de duplici natura Christi (ibid. 1656).

Piromalli wrote sixteen works never printed, among which we may mention a Vocabulary and a Grammar of the Armenian language.

== Bibliography ==
- This article incorporates public domain material from McClintock, John; Strong, James (1867–1887). Cyclopædia of Biblical, Theological and Ecclesiastical Literature. Harper and Brothers.
- Busolini, Dario (2015). "PIROMALLI, Paolo". Dizionario Biografico degli Italiani (in Italian). Vol. 84: Piovene–Ponzo. Rome: Istituto dell'Enciclopedia Italiana. ISBN 978-88-12-00032-6.
- Cheney, David M. "Archbishop Paolo Piromalli, O.P. †". Catholic-Hierarchy.org. (for Chronology of Bishops) ^{[self-published]}
