= Azarias Friton =

Most Reverend Azarias Friton
- Archbishop of Nakhchivan
- Church: Catholic Church
- Archdiocese: Archdiocese of Nakhchivan
- In office: 1604–1607
- Predecessor: Nicholas Friton
- Successor: Matthaeus Erasmos

Orders
- Consecration: 9 May 1604 by Girolamo Bernerio

Personal details
- Born: 1563
- Died: 7 January 1607 (aged 43–44) Rome, Papal States
- Buried: San Nicola da Tolentino agli Orti Sallustiani, Rome

Azarias Friton, O.P. (1563 – 7 January, 1607) was a Roman Catholic prelate who served as Archbishop of Nakhchivan (1604–1607).

== Biography ==
Azarias Friton was born in 1563 and appointed a priest in the Order of Preachers. On 24 March 1604, he was appointed during the papacy of Pope Clement VIII as Archbishop of Nakhchivan as successor to his uncle Nicholas Friton. On 9 May 1604, he was consecrated bishop by Girolamo Bernerio, Cardinal-Bishop of Albano, with Agostino Quinzio, Bishop of Korčula, and Leonard Abel, Titular Bishop of Sidon, serving as co-consecrators. He served as Archbishop of Nakhchivan until his death on 7 January 1607 in Rome. His current resting place is San Nicola da Tolentino agli Orti Sallustiani.

Catholic Church titles
Preceded by Nicholas Friton	Archbishop of Nakhchivan; 1604–1607	Succeeded by Matthaeus Erasmos
