= Mesrop Mashtots Monastery =

Armenian monastery in Nəsirvaz, Nakhchivan, Azerbaijan

- St. Gr. Lusavorich Monastery
- Սուրբ Մեսրոպ Մաշտոց վանք
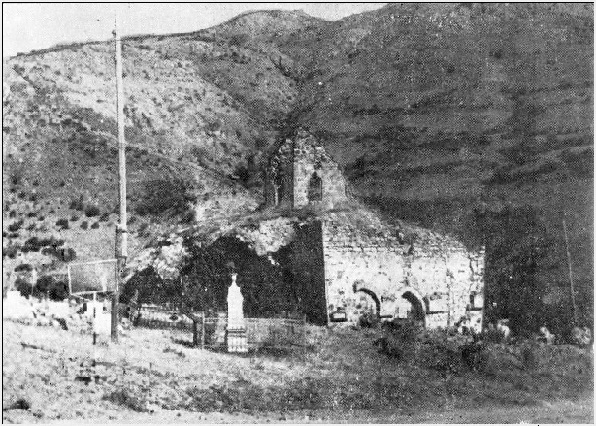
- Mesrop Mashtots Monastery
- 39°10′6.179″N 45°55′25.061″E
- Location: Nəsirvaz
- Country: Azerbaijan
- Denomination: Armenian Apostolic Church

History
- Status: Destroyed
- Founded: 456

Architecture
- Demolished: 1997–2006

Mesrop Mashtots Monastery or St. Gr. Lusavorich Monastery was an Armenian monastery located in Nəsirvaz village (Ordubad district) of the Nakhchivan Autonomous Republic of Azerbaijan. The monastery was located in the western part of the village.

== History ==
The monastery was founded in 456 by Prince Shabit of Goghtn. The existing Armenian inscriptions in the walls of the church show that it was renovated in the 15th and 17th centuries as well as the late 19th century.

== Architecture ==
The monastery complex had outer walls, porch, and subsidiary buildings which were no longer extant in the late Soviet period. The inventor of the Armenian alphabet, Mesrop Mashtots, once lived in the monastery complex. The church of the monastery was a small domed structure consisting of a hall, main apse, and two vestries, with Armenian inscriptions on the interior. Four pillars supported a large cupola with eight windows, adjacent to which was a small bell tower.

== Destruction ==
The church of the monastery complex was still standing in the 1970 and 1980s. However, it was destroyed by June 15, 2006, as documented by satellite investigation of the Caucasus Heritage Watch.

The monastery complex had also an Armenian cemetery with 300–320 tombstones which was located just north to the monastery. The cemetery was also destroyed by June 15, 2006.
