= Tigranakert (Nakhchivan) =

Ancient Armenian city

- Interactive map of Tigranakert
- Cultures: Armenian
- Location: Unidentified, most likely along the Vanandchay river
- Region: Armenian Highlands

History
- Built: 1st century BCE
- Built by: Tigranes the Great

Tigranakert (Armenian: Տիգրանակերտ) or Tigranavan (Armenian: Տիգրանավան) was an ancient Armenian city founded by Tigranes the Great, King of Armenia in the 1st century BCE. It was one of four cities established by Tigranes the Great which carry his name. The one at Nakhchivan is said to have served as a residence for Tigranes' sister, Tigranuhi.

== Etymology ==
The name Tigranakert consists of the name of Tigranes the Great with the Armenian suffix -kert, meaning “made by”. Therefore, the literal translation of the city name is “Made by Tigran.” Additionally, the name Tigranavan comes from the same origin but instead uses the Armenian suffix -avan, meaning town.

== History ==
The location of Tigranakert of Nakhchivan has not yet been identified yet, but Suren Yeremian places its approximate location along the Vanandchay river, north of Dəstə. Movses Khorenatsi writes about this in his book titled The History of Armenia, that "... (Tigran) sends his sister Tigranuhi to Armenia as a king and in large numbers, the settlement that Tigranes built in his name, that is, Tigranakert, the provinces call for his service to put in. And the aristocratic class called the Vosta of those parts says that it originated from this generation, as if it were a royal generation."

Later, this settlement has been mentioned as a city since the 1st century, during the invasions of the Roman general Corbulo on the city of Artashat, due to the resistance organized by the Armenians.

In the Middle Ages, Tigranavan had a population of 500,000-600,000 Armenians and occupied a large area within its fortified walls.

== See also ==
- Goghtn
- Armenians in Nakhchivan
- Armenian Catholic Church
