= Church of Shrju =

Armenian church in Nakhchivan, Azerbaijan

- Շրջուի եկեղեցի
- Church of Shrju
- Location: Tivi
- Country: Azerbaijan
- Denomination: Armenian Apostolic Church

History
- Status: Destroyed

Architecture
- Style: Basilica
- Demolished: 1997–2006

Church of Shrju was an Armenian church located near Tivi village (Ordubad district) of the Nakhchivan Autonomous Republic of Azerbaijan. The church was located some 2 km north-east to Tivi village, in the southeastern part of the abandoned village of Shrju.

== History ==
The founding date of the church is unknown. It was probably renovated in the 17th century.

== Architecture ==
The church was partially dilapidated in the late Soviet period, but the structure was sufficiently preserved. It was a basilica with a nave, two aisles, a five-sided apse on the exterior with two-storied vestries on either side.

== Destruction ==
The church was razed to ground at some point between 1997 and June 15, 2006, as documented by investigation of the Caucasus Heritage Watch.
