= St. Stepanos Monastery (Tivi) =

Armenian monastery in Nakhchivan, Azerbaijan

- St. Stepanos Monastery of Navush
- Սուրբ Ստեփանոս անապատ
- St. Stepanos Monastery
- Location: Tivi
- Country: Azerbaijan
- Denomination: Armenian Apostolic Church

History
- Status: Destroyed
- Founded: 11–12th centuries

Architecture
- Demolished: 1997–2006

St. Stepanos Monastery was an Armenian monastery located near Tivi village (Ordubad district) of the Nakhchivan Autonomous Republic of Azerbaijan. The monastery was located some 2 km south of Tivi village, on high ground in the abandoned village of Navush.

== History ==
The monastery was founded in the 11–12th centuries, its apse contains 15th century cross-stones (khachkars). An Armenian inscription on the tympanum attests that the church was renovated in 1677.

== Architecture ==
In Armenian manuscripts, St. Stepanos is referred as both a hermitage and a monastery. One of the first mentions of St. Stepanos is in a colophon of a gospel that was copied in 1489 and restored in the monastery. The monastery was a basilica with gabled roof and had a nave and two aisles. In the apse and two vestries were secret chambers.

== Destruction ==
The monastery was razed to ground at some point between 1997 and June 15, 2006, as documented by investigation of the Caucasus Heritage Watch.
