= Nicholas Friton =

Armenian Roman Catholic prelate

Most Reverend Nicholas Friton
- Bishop of Nakhchivan
- Church: Catholic Church
- Diocese: Diocese of Nakhchivan
- In office: 1560–1597
- Successor: Azarias Friton

Personal details
- Died: 1597 Nakhchivan, Armenia

Nicholas Friton, OP (died 1597) was a Roman Catholic prelate who served as Bishop of Nakhchivan (1560–1597).

== Biography ==
On 20 October 1560, Nicholas Friton was appointed during the papacy of Pope Pius IV as Bishop of Nakhchivan. According to Vincenzo degli Alessandri, to whom he gave shelter for 48 days, Friton visited Venice twice - once on 13 June 1561 and on 26 April 1569. He visited Rome four times as well.

Pope Pius IV addressed a letter to Nicholas in 1562, ordered him to send to the Patriarch of the Chaldeans, Abdisho IV Maron, "a man proficient in the study of the Syriac language and ecclesiastical sciences." Later Pius sent another letter on February 23, 1565 and declared that he has ordered Jean-Baptiste to visit Nicolas, his clergy, and his people on his behalf. Furthermore, the Pope sent Nicolas, through his Nuncio, the decrees issued by the Council of Trent and instructed him to accept "those matters pertaining to faith."

He served as Bishop of Nakhchivan until his death in 1597. He was succeeded by his nephew Azarias Friton.

Catholic Church titles
Preceded by	Bishop of Nakhchivan; 1560–1597	Succeeded by Azarias Friton
