= Roman Catholic Archdiocese of Nakhchivan =

The Catholic Archdiocese of Nakhchivan (also known as Diocese of Naxivan, - of Nakhtchevan, or of Nachitschewan; Latin Name: Archidioecesis Naxivansa) was a Latin Catholic diocese in Azerbaijan, located in the city of Nakhchivan, in modern-day Azerbaijan. In 1847, it was suppressed.

The last remains of its ancient cathedral of All Saints in the episcopal see were destroyed in the 1845 earthquake.

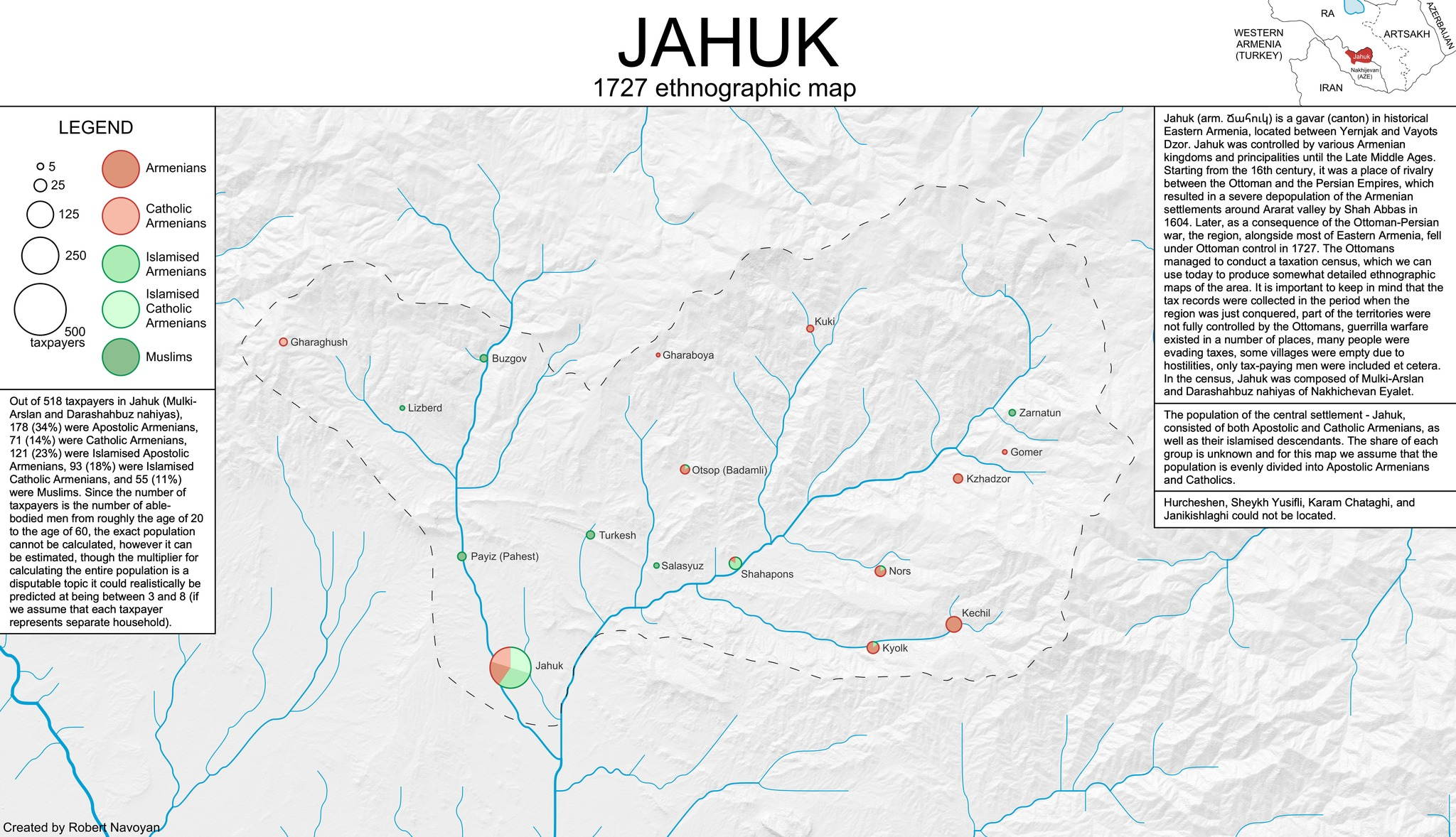

== History ==
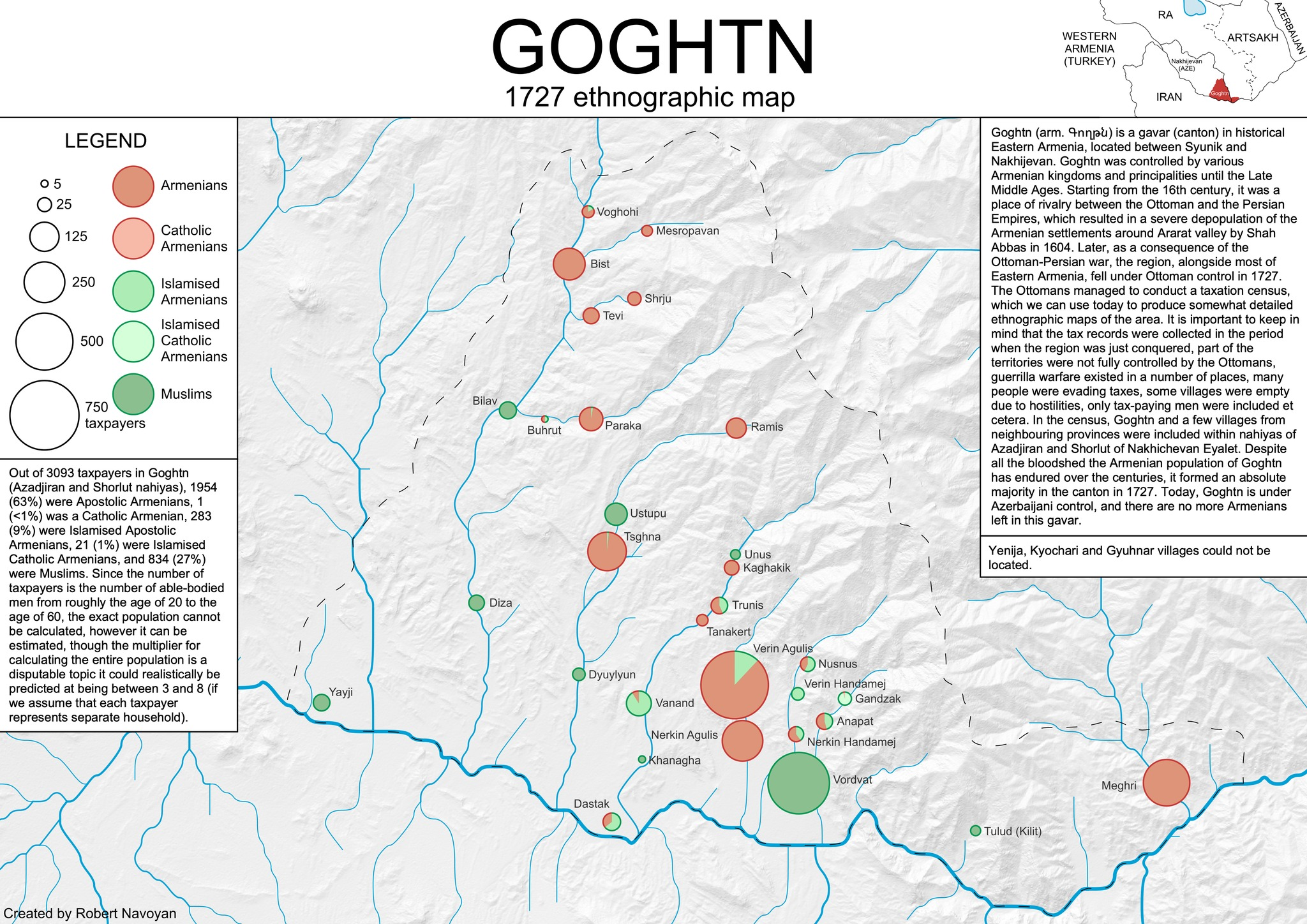

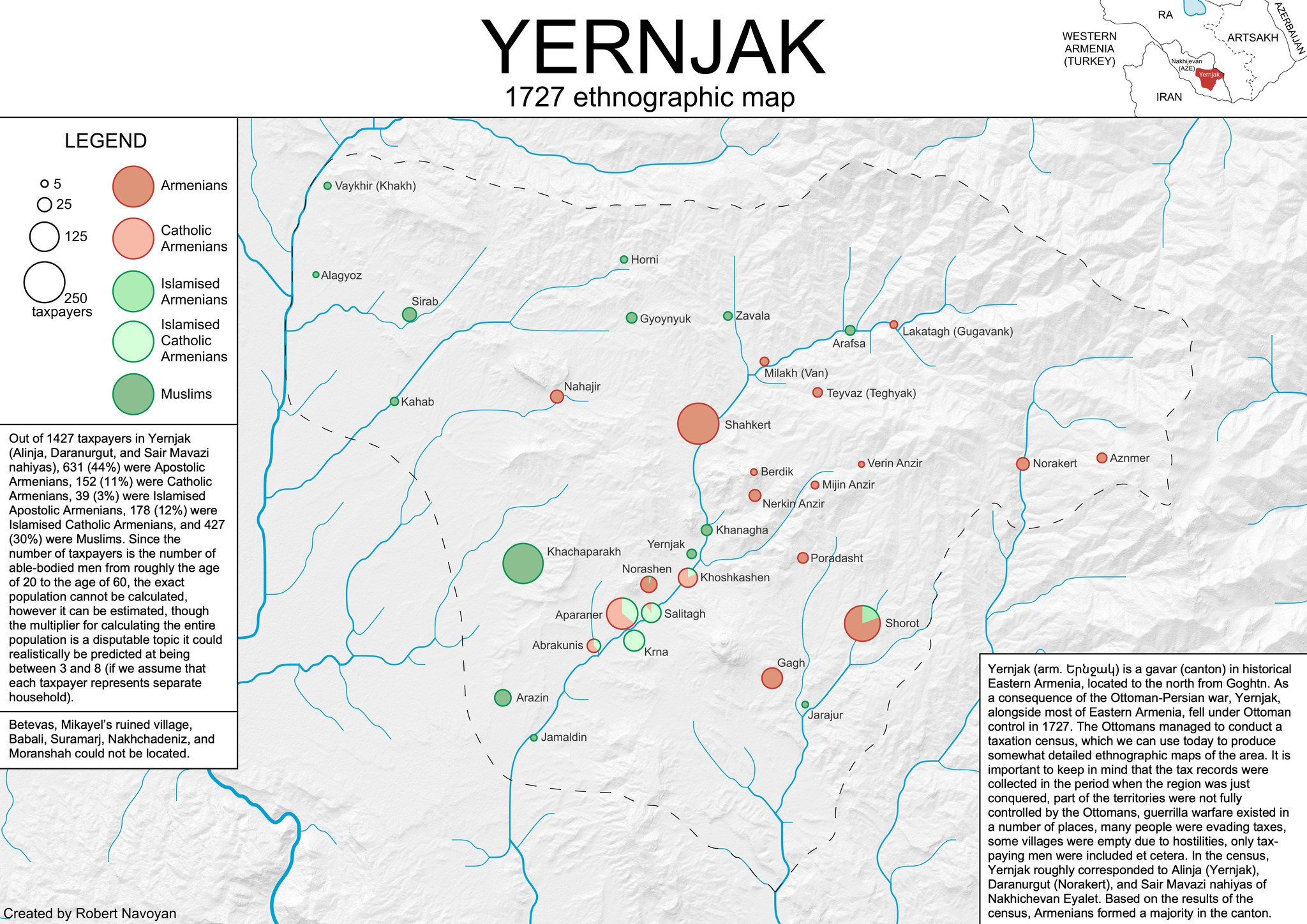

- Established in 1318 as Diocese of Nakhijevan, on territory previously not covered by the Latin church, covering historical Armenia and present-day Azerbaijan, presumably exempt. It was the only Latin see in the region to survive the ravaging hordes of conqueror Tamerlane (1380s).
- The Dominican Order, whose missionaries founded it, branched out there into a new associated congregation, the Fratres Unitores ('Uniting Friars'), which fielded all the clergy in the bishopric. From its 15th century peek with circa 700 friars in some 50 convents, by 1602 it shrinks to twelve convents pastorally serving circa 19,000 Catholic faithful. In the region of Julfa the catholic professing settlements were the villages of Saltagh, Kirna, and Aparan. In the neighboring region of Goghtn there was the village of Gandzak, and in central Nakhichevan the village of Jahuk.
- By privileges, confirmed by Paul III's papal bulla Etsi ex debito on 28 February 1544, it could celebrate the Latin rite in Armenian language (instead of Latin) and its episcopate was chosen by an assembly representing the Dominican monasteries and the Armenian Catholic elite
- Its actual see (not the title) was moved in the 16th century to more central Aparan (now Aparan), closer to the actual Catholic communities. Under Safavid pressure the communities dwindled due to conversion to Islam and Turkification, masse conversions to Islam were noted in the 1650s In the Julfa villages in particular, by the 17th century diocesan activity seems effectively to have halted. Around 1620 Pope Gregory XV instigated the founding of a Dominican seminary in Abaran.
- Elevated on 21 February 1633 as Archdiocese of Nakhchivan, but not Metropolitan, and indeed never had a suffragan.
- Suppressed in 1847, apparently vacant since 1765, as its faithful had fled the country during the wars between Ottoman Turks and Safavid Persia.
- It is without direct successor jurisdiction, but the last Archbishop took his flock to Smyrna (now Izmir, Asian Turkey), where their Armenian community flourished. Its former territories are presently part of the larger jurisdiction of the Apostolic Administration of the Caucasus (Armenia and Georgia) and by the Apostolic Prefecture of Baku (all Azerbaijan)

== Episcopal ordinaries ==
(all Roman Rite, (mostly Italian) missionary members of Latin congregations)

Bishops of Nachitschewan

- Nicholas Friton (20 October 1560 – death 1597)
- Azarias Friton, Dominican Order (O.P.) (24 March 1604 – death 7 January 1607)
- Matthaeus Erasmos, O.P. (22 Oct 1607 Ordained Bishop – death 9 July 1627)
- Angelus Maria Cittadini, Carthusians (O.Cart.) (9 July 1627 – death 10 December 1629), succeeding as former Coadjutor Bishop of Nachitschewan (1624.07.15 – 1627.07.09) and Titular Archbishop of Myra (1624.07.15 – 1627.07.09)
- Augustinus Basrci (Bagesius), O.P. (1633 – 21 February 1633 see below)

Archbishops of Nachitschewan (non-Metropolitan)

- Augustinus Basrci (Bagesius), O.P. (see above 21 February 1633 – death 16 April 1652)
- Paolo Piromalli, O.P. (14 June 1655 – resigned 15 Dec 1664), next Archbishop-Bishop of Bisignano (Italy) (1664.12.15 – death 1667.07.12)
- Matteo Avanian alias Avanisensis, O.P. (14 May 1668 – death 14 July 1674)
- Thomas Tatumensis, O.P. (12 Nov 1675 – 14 Oct 1680 ?Resigned)
- Sebastien Knab, O.P. (28 Sep 1682 – death 8 Sep 1690)
- Paul Baptiste Avanian, O.P. (24 March 1692 – death 1701)
- Stephanus Sciran, O.P. (15 Jan 1703 – death 1707?)
- Giovanni Vincenzo Castelli, O.P. (15 April 1709 – 4 May 1709 Resigned), not possessed; next Titular Archbishop of Marcianopolis (1709.06.19 – 1714.03.21), Archbishop-Bishop (i.e. Archbishop of a residential, in casu suffragan, bishopric) of Urbania (Italy) (1714.03.21 – 1736.09) and Archbishop-Bishop of Sant’Angelo in Vado (Italy) (1714.03.21 – death 1736.09)
- Alessandro Felice (Pietro Martire) Mercanti, O.P. (6 May 1709 – death 25 Feb 1721)
- Archangelus Feni, O.P. (20 April 1722 – 1731 Resigned), died 1747
- Domenico Maria (Michelangelo) Salvini, O.P. (born Italy) (21 July 1732 – death 10 Dec 1765)

== See also ==
- List of Catholic dioceses in Transcaucasia
- Armenian Catholic Church
- Catholic Church in Armenia
- Catholic Church in Azerbaijan

== Sources and external links ==
- GCatholic

Bibliography

- Leonardus Lemmens, Hierarchia latina Orientis, mediante S. Congregatione de propaganda fide instituita (1622-1922), in Orientalia Christiana, vol. I, n° 5 (1923), pp. 232–250
- François Tournebize, Les Frères Uniteurs ou Dominicains Arméniens (1330-1794), in Revue de l'Orient Chrétien, vol. XXII (1920-1921), pp. 145–161 e 249-279
- Gaetano Moroni, lemma 'Naxivan' in Dizionario di erudizione storico-ecclesiastica, vol. 47, Venice 1847, pp. 250–251
- Konrad Eubel, Hierarchia Catholica Medii Aevi, vol. 1, p. 354; vol. 2, p. 198; vol. 3, p. 252; vol. 4, p. 253; vol. 5, pp. 281–282; vol. 6, p. 303
- Michel Lequien, Oriens christianus in quatuor Patriarchatus digestus, Paris 1740, vol. III, coll. 1403-1414
