= Matthaeus Erasmos =

Most Reverend Matthaeus Erasmos
- Archbishop of Nachitschewan
- Church: Catholic Church
- See: Archdiocese of Nakhchivan
- In office: 1607–1627
- Predecessor: Azarias Friton
- Successor: Angelus Maria Cittadini

Personal details
- Born: Matteos Miranshah; 1567
- Died: 9 July 1627 (age 60) Nachitschewan, Safavid Iran

Matthaeus Erasmos, O.P. (born Armenian: Մատթեոս Միրանշահ, romanized: Mattʿēos Miranšah, 1567–1627) was a Roman Catholic prelate who served as Archbishop of Nachitschewan (1607–1627).

== Biography ==
Matthaeus Erasmos was born in 1567 and ordained a priest in the Order of Preachers. On 22 October 1607, he was appointed during the papacy of Pope Paul V as Archbishop of Nachitschewan. He served as Archbishop of Nachitschewan until his death on 9 July 1627.

Catholic Church titles
Preceded by Azarias Friton	Archbishop of Nachitschewan; 1607–1627	Succeeded by Angelus Maria Cittadini
