= Sebastien Knab =

Most Reverend Sebastien Knab
- Archbishop of Nakhijevan
- Church: Catholic Church
- Archdiocese: Archdiocese of Nakhchivan
- In office: 1682–1690
- Predecessor: Thomas Tatumensis
- Successor: Paul Baptiste Avanian

Orders
- Consecration: 18 October 1682 by Alessandro Crescenzi (cardinal)

Personal details
- Born: c. 1632 Bamberg, Germany
- Died: 8 September 1690 Nakhchivan, Safavid dynasty

Sebastien Knab, O.P. (c. 1632 – 8 September 1690) was a Roman Catholic prelate who served as Archbishop of Nakhijevan (1682–1690).

== Biography ==
Sebastien Knab was born in Bamberg in around 1632 and ordained a priest in the Order of Preachers. On 28 September 1682, he was appointed during the papacy of Pope Innocent XI as Archbishop of Nakhchivan. On 18 October 1682, he was consecrated bishop by Alessandro Crescenzi (cardinal), Bishop of Recanati e Loreto, with Odoardo Cibo, Titular Archbishop of Seleucia in Isauria, and Gregorio Carducci, Bishop of Valva e Sulmona, serving as co-consecrators. He served as Archbishop of Nakhchivan until his death on 8 September 1690.

Catholic Church titles
Preceded by Thomas Tatumensis	Archbishop of Nakhchivan; 1682–1690	Succeeded by Paul Baptiste Avanian
