= St. Astvatsatsin Monastery (Kyrna) =

Armenian monastery in Nakhchivan, Azerbaijan

- Kusaber Monastery
- Սուրբ Աստվածածին վանք
- Location: Kırna
- Country: Azerbaijan

History
- Status: Destroyed
- Founded: 1330

Architecture
- Demolished: 2001–2009

St. Astvatsatsin Monastery or Kusaber Monastery was an Armenian monastery located in the village of Kırna (Julfa District) of the Nakhchivan Autonomous Republic of Azerbaijan. The monastery was located southeast of the village.

== History ==
The monastery was built in 1330 and was renovated in the 17th century.

At the beginning of the 14th century, the monastery was home to the University of Kirna, a school belonging to the Armenian Catholic congregation. Until its abandonment in 1740, numerous ancient philosophical texts were copied and translated here.

The central sanctuary of the monastic complex was on the 1988 list of Historical and Cultural Monuments of the Soviet Azerbaijan as a "mausoleum".

The vaulted monastic buildings and monks' cells that lined the structure on three sides were completely ruined by the late Soviet period.

== Destruction ==
The central sanctuary of the monastic complex was still extant by 2001 and by November 11, 2009, the structure had been demolished and its traces removed from the site, as documented by investigation of the Caucasus Heritage Watch.
