= Saltaq =

Saltag
- Municipality
- Azerbaijani: Saltaq
- Location within Azerbaijan
- Coordinates: 39°09′08″N 45°39′58″E
- Country: Azerbaijan
- Autonomous republic: Nakhchivan
- District: Julfa

Population (2005)
  - Total: 1,566
- Time zone: UTC+4 (AZT)

Saltaq (also rendered as Saltag and Saltakh) or Salitagh (Armenian: Սալիթաղ, romanized: Salit’aġ) is a village and municipality in the Julfa District of Nakhchivan, Azerbaijan. It is located 30 km in the north from the district center, on the right bank of the Alinjachay River, on the slope of the Zangezur ridge. Its population is busy with vine-growing, farming and animal husbandry. There are a secondary school, a cultural house, two libraries, a club, a kindergarten, a communication center, and a medical center in the village. It has a population of 1,566. The monument of Yeyja of the Middle Ages was discovered in the northeast of the village.

Armenian sources mention the name of the village for the first time in 1383 or 1384. It had been recorded by the Catholic archdiocese of Nakhchivan that 130 Armenian families in Kyrna and Saltag had converted to Islam in the 1600s and had been Turkified.

== Etymology ==
According to Azerbaijani sources, a nearby homonymous mountain is made out from the components of sal (smooth stone) and taq (an ancient form of the word of "dağ" (mountain)); thus: "the mountain with the slab stone" or "the steepness rocky mountain".

According to Armenian sources, the village was the district of the ancient city of Tigranavan. Because of its location on large slabs, it was called Salitagh (սալ ["sal", slab] and [թաղ ["t'agh", district]), which is the Armenian name for the village.

== Historical and archaeological monuments ==
=== Yeyja ===
Yeycə (Yeyja) - the settlement of the Middle Ages in the north-east from the Saltag village of the Julfa District, on the left bank of the Alinjachay River. It is limited by the Alinjachay in the west, with the deep valley in the north and south, with the low hills in the east. Its area is 1850 m2. It was recorded in 1991. The buildings on the monument are completely destroyed, in its place were kept the square and oval pits. The surface materials consists from the products of the glazed and unglazed pottery (fragments of cooked clay pot in the pink and gray colored), clay (jug, bowl-type containers), etc. According to the findings, the place of residence belongs to the 9th-18th centuries; it is believed that there is a cultural layer of the ancient period in here.

=== Saltag ===
Saltag - the place of residence of the Middle Ages in the east from the same named village in the Julfa District, on the left bank of the Alinjachay River. In 1991, the exploration research works were carried out. Its area is 56,000 m2. The place of residence currently divided into two parts through the irrigation ditch; The remains of the building clearly monitored in its north-east. Surface materials, mainly consists from the fragments of clay pot in the pink colored. During the excavation, cast piles of stone, fragments of the cooked brick, and the remains of the preserved wall in 1 m in length, were found. It is supposed that the Saltag settlement belongs to the 10h-16th centuries.

=== Saltag Necropolis I ===
Saltag Necropolis I - the archaeological monument of the Middle Ages in the west from the Saltag settlement of the Julfa District, on the left bank Alinjachay River, on the high hill. In 1991, the exploration research works were carried out. Many of the grave monuments have been destroyed during the farm works. Archaeological cultural relics shows that the Saltag necropolis belongs to the 14th-16th centuries.

=== Saltag Necropolis II ===
Saltag Necropolis II - the archaeological monument of the Middle Ages in the north-west from the Saltag village of the Julfa District, on the right bank of the Alinjachay River. It is located in a valley surrounded by mountains on all sides. Part of the cemetery is completely destroyed, the other part currently is used by the local population. The tomb built with the stone in its center, especially attracts an attention. It is supposed that the necropolis belongs to the 14th-16th centuries.

=== Saltag Tomb ===
Saltag Tomb - the monument of the 14th-16th centuries in the necropolis which located in the north-west from the same named village of the Julfa District. It was built with the small stones in the center of the cemetery. Its ceiling has been completed in the crown form; its entrance is protruding to the outward. Also the cooked brick (23х23х5 cm; 20х10х5 cm) were used at the construction of the door (most likely, these bricks associated with its further restoration). Interior walls of the tomb was plastered with alabaster; was collapsed in some places. Inside were discovered the wooden coffin and the remains of a human skeleton.
