= Biləv =

- Municipality
- Location within Azerbaijan
- Coordinates: 39°04′35″N 45°50′50″E
- Country: Azerbaijan
- Autonomous republic: Nakhchivan
- District: Ordubad

Population (2005)
  - Total: 1,203
- Time zone: UTC+4 (AZT)

Biləv (also, Bilyav) is a village and municipality in the Ordubad District of Nakhchivan, Azerbaijan. It is located on the Ordubad-Bist highway, 35 km in the north-west from the district center. Its population is busy with gardening, beekeeping and animal husbandry. There are secondary school, club, library, branch of communications and a medical center in the village. It has a population of 1,203. The remains of material culture of the Bronze and early Iron Age were found from the Bilav village. There are also Necropolis and the bridge with two spans of the medieval ages in village of Bilav.

== Historical and archaeological monuments ==
=== Bilav Bridge ===
Bilav bridge - located in the south of the Bilav village of Ordubad region, on the Gilanchay river. Only a portion of the bridge of the 18th century has remained to the present day. The distances between the spans are different. The span similar to arch was built on the formal square supporting pillars. The width of the bridge is 3.3 m, and it is 55 m in length. Bilav bridge was built with large stones and rocks, covered with hewn stones.

=== Bilav Necropolis ===
Bilav Necropolis - the archaeological monument of the Middle Ages nearby, the same named village of the Ordubad rayon. It was discovered in 1968. It was covered of the large area. Necropolis consist of the soil graves in rectangular shape, oriented towards from west to east. Head and chest stones of the graves are different (flat stone, tomb and ram stone statues), there are articles in Arabic-language on some of them. Bilav Necropolis belongs to the 14-16 centuries.
