= Məzrə, Ordubad =

Məzrə
- Municipality
- Location within Azerbaijan
- Coordinates: 39°03′22″N 45°55′16″E
- Country: Azerbaijan
- Autonomous republic: Nakhchivan
- District: Ordubad

Population (2005)
  - Total: 139
- Time zone: UTC+4 (AZT)

Məzrə (also, Mazrya) is a village and municipality in the Ordubad District of Nakhchivan, Azerbaijan. It is located 40 km in the north-west from the district center. Its population is busy with gardening, farming and animal husbandry. There are secondary school, club, library and a medical center in the village. It has a population of 139.

== Etymology ==
The previous name of the village was Məzrəurs. It is believed that the settlement is so called, because it was founded in the arable land called Məzrə of the village of Nurs. Məzrə مزرعه in Persian (itself originally from Arabic) means "suitable land for arable, arable land and field", "a settlement founded on the basis of arable lands, hamlet, a small settlement".
