= Nəsirvaz =

Village in Ordubad, Nakhchivan, Azerbaijan

- Municipality
- Location within Azerbaijan
- Coordinates: 39°10′04″N 45°55′23″E
- Country: Azerbaijan
- Autonomous republic: Nakhchivan
- District: Ordubad

Population (2005)
  - Total: 157
- Time zone: UTC+4 (AZT)

Nəsirvaz (also Nasirvas or Nasiruas) formerly Mesropavan (Armenian: Մեսրոպավան, Russian: Месропаван) is a village in the Ordubad District of Nakhchivan, Azerbaijan. In the municipality of Bist village, it is located near the Ordubad-Nurgut highway, to the north-west of the district center, on the foothill. It has a population of 157.

== History ==
The settlement, located in the Goght'n district of historical Armenia, had been one of the cultural centers of Nakhchivan. In the village was an Armenian church called Surp Grigor, also known as the Mesrop Mashtots monastery church, part of a monastery believed to date back to the 5th century. According to Koriun, Mashtots had conceived the idea of creating an alphabet for the Armenian language while residing at this monastery.

Petroglyphs have been found near the village, at a site called Gamigaya. In the area known as "Nabi land" besides the rock carvings also has artifacts from the Bronze and Iron of the medieval period and as well as the interesting tombstones.

== Monuments ==
Mesrop Mashtots Monastery or St. Gr. Lusavorich Monastery was located in the western part of the village. The monastery was destroyed by June 15, 2006. There was also an old Armenian cemetery located north to the monastery, the cemetery was also destroyed by June 15, 2006.

== See also ==
- Mesrop Mashtots Monastery (Nasirvaz)
