= Yamxana =

- Location within Azerbaijan
- Coordinates: 39°09′35″N 45°26′22″E
- Country: Azerbaijan
- Autonomous republic: Nakhchivan
- District: Babek
- Time zone: UTC+4 (AZT)
  - Summer (DST): UTC+5 (AZT)

Yamxana is a Nakhchivan Autonomous Republic village in Azerbaijan.
