= Yarımca, Nakhchivan =

Yarımca
- Municipality
- Location within Azerbaijan
- Coordinates: 39°13′42″N 45°26′45″E
- Country: Azerbaijan
- Autonomous republic: Nakhchivan
- District: Babek

Population
  - Total: 1,336
- Time zone: UTC+4 (AZT)
  - Summer (DST): UTC+5 (AZT)

Yarımca (also, Yarmıca and Yarymdzha) is a village and municipality in the Babek District of Nakhchivan, Azerbaijan. It has a population of 1,336.
