= Gamigaya Petroglyphs =

- Gəmiqaya petroqlifləri
- Interactive map of Gamigaya Petroglyphs
- Location: Azerbaijan. Territory of Ordubad Rayon, not far from Nəsirvaz village’s border and Azerbaijan’s border with Armenia.
- Coordinates: 39.16°N 45.92°E
- Beginning date: 4th-1st millennia BC

Gamigaya rock carvings (Azerbaijani: Gəmiqaya petroqlifləri) - are dated to the 4th-1st millennia BC including the Bronze and Early Iron Ages in the territory of Ordubad Rayon, not far from Nəsirvaz village's border and Azerbaijan’s border with Armenia.

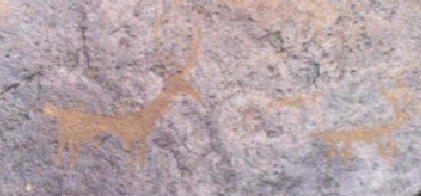
Deer

Gamigaya (stone ship) – is the name of Gapyjiq summit (3906) - one of the summits of the Lesser Caucasus, where according to a local legend during a flood myth Noah's Ark pulled in to and turned to a stone in due course. There have been found about 1500 punched out and carved rock images of deer, goats, bulls, dogs, snakes, birds, fantastic beings, and also people, carriages and various symbols. Chaotically drawn images of dancing people can be also met among the images.

Many of these images were fixed not far from springs, in the territory of Garangush plateau. Images of people were carved schematically. Single, pair and group images can also be found there. A person's image near a horse is considered one of the unique ones.

Images of goats pointing to that, goats took a main place in cattle-breeding life of local population. On one of the rocks a painter portrayed a stressed leopard. Realistic drawings of deer are also very interesting.

Beside the Garangush flat, there are rock carvings in Nabiyurdy and Jamishoglan territories. Petroglyphs drawn on black and gray stones have a pink appearance. Stone chipping, carving, and scrapping techniques were used while drawing images on Gamigaya. Images illustrate the rituals and spiritual life of ancient people in Nakhchivan as well as their economic life, lifestyle, craftsmanship skills. Petroglyphs cover the ancient history of many centuries from primitive communal society to feudalism.

Topographical positions of drawings are complicated. Drawings that are in group shape are mainly located near the water resources. Such drawings are observed in the northeast of Dali bulag. Far from these sources, drawings are observed less.

A collection of Gamigaya petroglyphs, especially the ones nearby Bibgatal worship place, proves that they do not only illustrate people's semi-nomadic lifestyle, but also the beliefs of ancient humans. For instance, there are pictures of a person and moon and sun above him shows the astrological beliefs and religious-ideological views of ancient people. Those pictures date back to IV-I millenniums B.C.

Beside the pictures of animals, dancing people, and hunting people, there were found pictographic signs such as circles, triangles, rectangles, and fortune symbols. Those sings were found in I Kultapa, on the surface of clay plaque, which belongs to Bronze Age.

== History ==
Due to tough climate and heavy rains, approximately 150 settlements were buried under water in Kura-Aras lowlands. For that reason, people who lived in that territory moved to the mountains in west, where they put the foundation of Gamigaya rock art culture.

== Expeditions ==
The investigation of Gamigaya petroglyphs started in 1968. During 1970–1987, 2001–2002, and afterwards, A. Seyidov, N. Museyibli, V. Aliyev, and V. Bakhshaliyev conducted archaeological expeditions. On 26 April 2001, Supreme Council of Nakhchivan Autonomous Republic passed an order on “Research of Gamigaya monument in Ordubad district”. After the order, the number of archaeological expeditions increased. New Gamigaya petroglyphs were found in 2008.

== Gallery ==
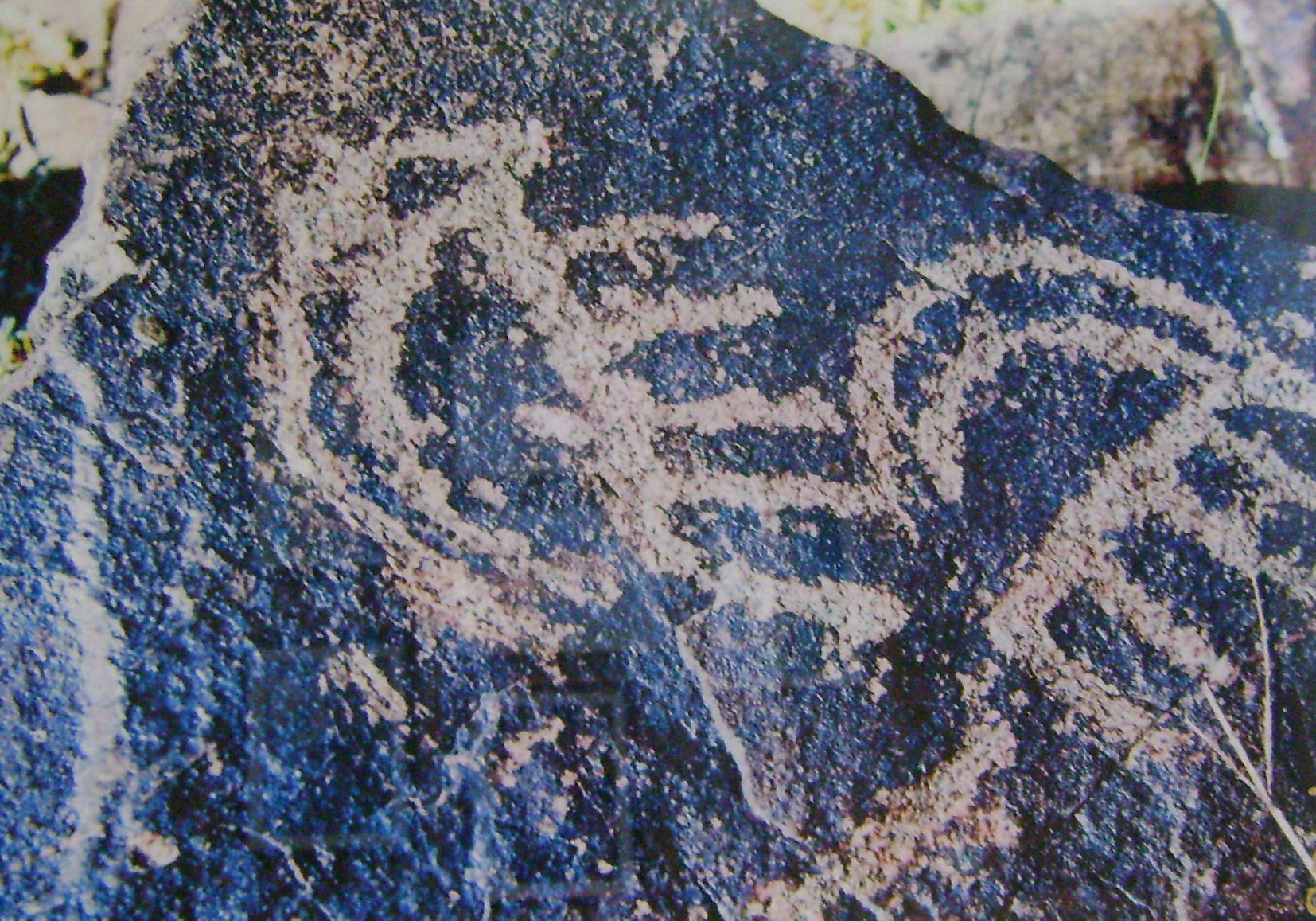

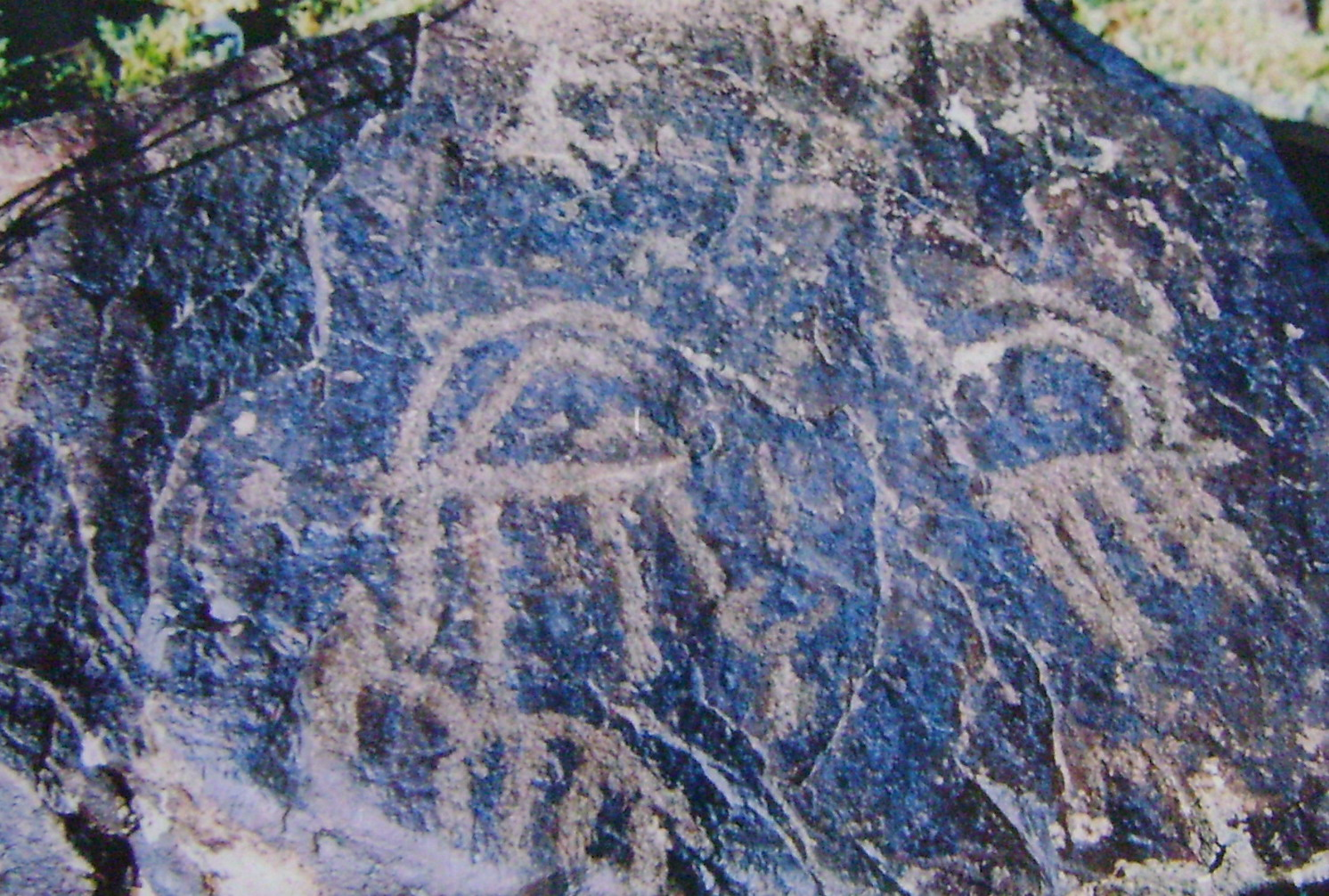

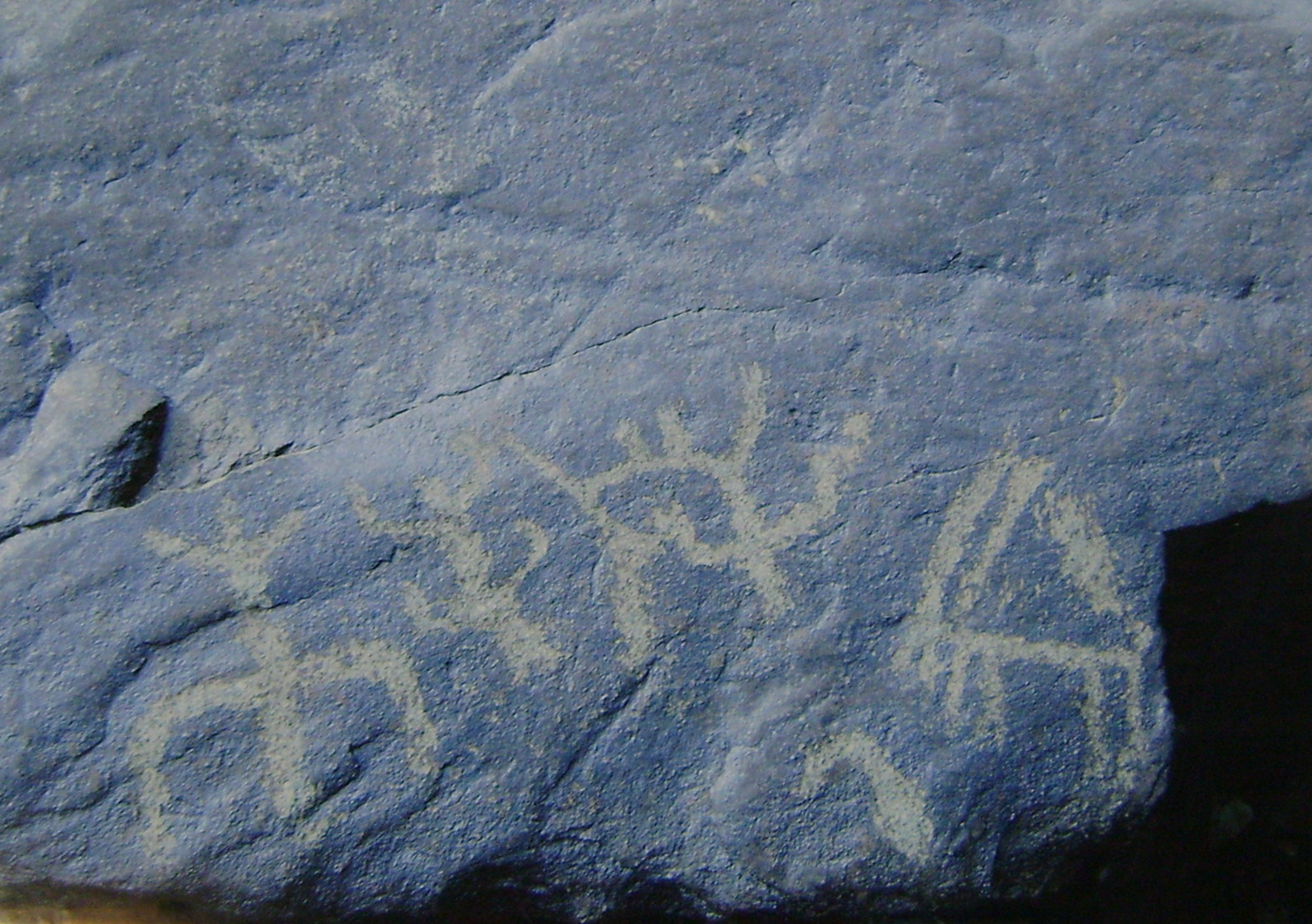

== See also ==
Rock art
