= Vladimir Sargsyan =

Armenian scientist (1935–2013)

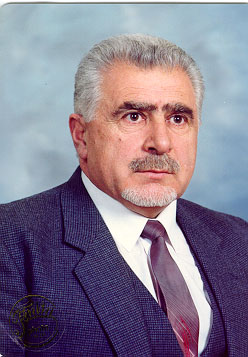
- Born: Vladimir Sargsyan; 25 June 1935; Jolfa, Armenian: Ջուղա, Nakhchivan Autonomous Republic
- Died: 3 January 2013 (aged 77); Yerevan, Armenia
- Education: Yerevan State University
- Scientific career
- Fields: Mechanics, Deformable body mechanics
- Workplaces: Yerevan State University
- Academic advisors: Naghush Harutyunyan

Vladimir Sargsyan (Armenian: Վլադիմիր Սարգսյան, June 25, 1935 – January 3, 2013) was an Armenian scientist in the field of mechanics. He was a professor, Doctor of Physical and Mathematical Sciences, Academician of the Armenian National Academy of Sciences.

== Biography ==
- 1935 – Born on June 25, Jolfa, (Armenian: Ջուղա), Nakhchivan Autonomous Republic
- 1952 – Graduated from the School N17, Yerevan, Armenia
- 1952-1957 – Studied at the Mechanics Department of Physics and Mathematics Faculty of YSU
- 1957-1959 – Assistant of the Mechanics Department YSU
- 1959-1962 – Post-graduate student at YSU
- 1961-1963 – Senior Lecturer, Department of Higher Mathematics at YSU
- 1961-1966 – Visiting Fellow of the Institute of Mathematics and Mechanics of the Armenian SSR
- 1962 – Candidate of Physics and Mathematics
- 1963-1965, 1967-1973 – Associate Professor of the Theory of Elasticity and Plasticity Department YSU
- 1965-1967 – Senior Research Fellow of the Research Section of YSU
- 1968-1970 – Head of the Laboratory of Computational Methods CRLMS [Management Systems Central Research Laboratory]
- 1969-1978 – Head of the Preparatory Division of YSU
- 1972 – Doctor of Physics and Mathematics
- 1973 – Professor of the Theory of Elasticity and Plasticity, YSU
- 1976-1980 – Member of Speciality Council of Supreme Certifying Commission (SCC) of Armenia
- 1978-2003 – Head of Department of Solid Mechanics, YSU
- 1980-2007 – Chairman of Speciality Council of Supreme Certifying Commission (SCC) of Armenia
- 1986 – Corresponding Member of the Academy of Sciences of the Armenian SSR
- 1988-1990 – Dean of the Faculty of Mechanics, YSU
- 1990-1992 – Vice-rector for Scientific Affairs, YSU
- 1993-1994 – Acting Academic-Secretary of the Department of MITS of ANAS, Member of the Presidium of NAS Armenia
- 1994 – Deputy Chairman of the Board of the Institute of Mathematics and Mechanics of ANAS
- 1996 – Academician of RA National Academy of Sciences
- 1996-2007 – Dean of the Faculty of Mechanics, YSU
- 2007 – Honorary Head of the Department of Mechanics, YSU
- 2013 - Died on January 3 in Yerevan

== Participation in scientific organizations ==
- 1980 – Honorary member of the Mechanics Society of Slovak Academy of Sciences
- 1982-1991 – Chief Editor of Interuniversity Journal “Mechanics”, Member of editorial board of Journals “Uchenye zapiski EGU” and “Mechanics” ANAS
- 1985 – Member of the National Society of Theoretical and Applied Mechanics, USSR
- 1985 – Member of the Cooperation of Mechanics and Mathematics International Society
- 1986 – Member of the Scientific Council of "Structural Strength and Destruction" Society of Science and Technology of the USSR
- 1986 – Chairman of the Scientific-Methodical Commission of Mechanics from Transcaucasian Region
- 1989 – Member of the Presidency of the USSR Ministry of Education Methodical Council of Theoretical Mechanics and Chairman of the Transcaucasian Region
- 1993 – Member of National Committee of Theoretical and Applied Mechanics of Russian Academy of Sciences
- 1993 – Corresponding member of “Ararat” International Academy (Paris)
- 1994 – Member of the Engineering Academy of Armenia
- 1993-2006 – President of the National Committee for Theoretical and Applied Mechanics of Armenia
- 1994 – Expert of International Association of Interaction with Scientists from Former USSR (Belgium, INTAS)
- 1995 – Member of International Society for Structural and Multidisciplinary Optimization
- 1998 – Member of European Mechanics Society
- 1998 – Founding member of Slovakian Academy of Engineering Sciences
- 1998 – Foreign member of editorial board of Mechanics and Mathematics Journals (Ukraine, Egypt)

== Awards ==
- 1981 – Deserved Scientist of Armenia (1981),
- 1985 – Gold Medal of Yan Comenius University in Bratislava
- 1988 – Medal of Bratislava University
- 1992 – Mansoura University Medal (Egypt)
- 1999 – State Medal “Anania Shirakatsi”
- 2000 – Memorial Medal “Moscow State University - 250”
- 2005 – Award of “Achievement” of ANAS Presidium of RA
- 2005 – Memorable Gold Medal of Yerevan State University
- 2009 – Memorable Medal of Prime Minister RA
