= Üstüpü =

- Municipality
- Location within Azerbaijan
- Coordinates: 39°01′34″N 45°54′32″E
- Country: Azerbaijan
- Autonomous republic: Nakhchivan
- District: Ordubad

Population (2005)
  - Total: 1,342
- Time zone: UTC+4 (AZT)

Üstüpü (until 2003, Ustupu) is a village and municipality in the Ordubad District of Nakhchivan, Azerbaijan. It is located 36 km in the north-west from the district center. Its population is busy with gardening, beekeeping, farming and animal husbandry. There are secondary school, kindergarten, club and library in the village. It has a population of 1,342.

== Etymology ==
The local people pronounce the name of the village as Üstüpü. As a place of residence it is known since Safavid era (16th century). According to local residents, the village was named Üstüpir because in the upper (üst) side of the village was the sanctuary (pir), and later the name a bit distorted. At the western group of dialects of the Azerbaijani language ustupulu / ustuflu / ustublu used in meaning "neat, inhabited, prosperous". It can be assumed that the name of the ancient village is connected with the same meaning.

== Ustupu Bridge ==
Ustupu Bridge - the ancient bridge in the Ordubad region. It is in the 18 km of the Ustupu village, on the Duylunchay River. Its length is 10 pagonameters. It is believed that it has been built in the 18th century. The bridge, built in the highest construction technique has preserved its durability and the national architectural features. In the construction of the bridge were used the local stones. As a result of the reconstruction of the bridge (1996) the Mazra and Ustupu villages have got access to the highway.
