= Camaldın =

- Municipality
- Location within Azerbaijan
- Coordinates: 39°05′25″N 45°35′49″E
- Country: Azerbaijan
- Autonomous republic: Nakhchivan
- District: Julfa

Population (2005)
  - Total: 1,364
- Time zone: UTC+4 (AZT)

Camaldın (also, Camaldin, Jamaldin and Dzhamaldin) is a village and municipality in the Julfa District of Nakhchivan, Azerbaijan. It is located 18 km in the north from the district center, on the left bank of the Alinjachay River, on the slope of the Zangezur ridge. Its population is busy with vine-growing, farming and animal husbandry. There are secondary school, cultural house, two libraries, communication branch, kindergarten and a medical center in the village. It has a population of 1,364.

== Etymology ==
It is believed that the name of Jamaldin is the distorted form of the person name of Jamaleddin. In fact, the name made out from the components of Jamal (person's name) and din//dın (camping, summer pasture), took its name from the name of summer pasture of Jamal.

== Historical and archaeological monuments ==
=== Jamaldin ===
Jamaldin - the settlement of the Middle Ages (12th-17th centuries) in the north-east of the same named village of Julfa district. Is surrounded in the north by the Guruchay valley, in the east by the ravine, in the south-west by the cemetery, in the north-east by the mountain range. Its area is 96000 m2. Were found remains of building, numerous stone tools, fragments of the glazed and unglazed potteries in the pink colored.

=== Jamaldin Necropolis I ===
Jamaldin Necropolis I - the archaeological monument of ancient period in the south of the same named village of the Julfa rayon, on the plain area. It was discovered during construction works (1989). As a result of the researches from destroyed graves were found three clay jugs and a glass plate. The upper part of the pot graves and skeletons there, completely were destroyed. The pot graves which the mouth of them were closed with the large plate stone, was directed towards to the south and the south-west. During searches was discovered the grave of the stone box from the Jamaldin necropolis. In the grave there was the skeleton on the right side in the wrapped position, the head to the direction of the south-west. Were found the bronze ring on one of the hand fingers of the skeleton, from its neck side were found much black gem and serdolic beads, and on the top side of skull the large shells placed on top of each other.

=== Jamaldin Necropolis II ===
Jamaldin Necropolis II - the archaeological monument of the Middle Ages in the north-east of the same named village of the Julfa region, on the elongated hill. The graves are in direction of the west and the east, were a rectangular shape. The head stones of the majority graves kept and its surface were covered with piles of stones. As result of researches have been found the baked bricks in various sizes, fragments of the glazed pottery in the pink-colored. According to information of the local population, at the time the cemetery have been a lot of stone ram sculptures. According to the findings, it is assumed that the monument belongs to the 14th-18th centuries.
