= Zeynəddin =

- Municipality
- Location within Azerbaijan
- Coordinates: 39°14′55″N 45°28′00″E
- Country: Azerbaijan
- Autonomous republic: Nakhchivan
- District: Babek

Population
  - Total: 2,377
- Time zone: UTC+4 (AZT)

Zeynəddin is a village and municipality in the Babek District of Nakhchivan, Azerbaijan. It has a population of 2,377.
