= Ərəzin =

- Municipality
- Location within Azerbaijan
- Coordinates: 39°06′26″N 45°34′45″E
- Country: Azerbaijan
- Autonomous republic: Nakhchivan
- District: Julfa

Population (2005)
  - Total: 1,873
- Time zone: UTC+4 (AZT)

Ərəzin (also, Arazin and Arasin) is a village and municipality in the Julfa District of Nakhchivan, Azerbaijan. It is located 20 km in the north from the district center, on the right bank of the Alinjachay River, on the slope of the Zangezur ridge. Its population is busy with vine-growing, grain-growing and animal husbandry. There are secondary school, cultural house, two libraries, communication branch, kindergarten and a medical center in the village. It has a population of 1,873.

== Etymology ==
The village is named after the famous Arzin (Arizantu, Arzan) people.

"Arz" in ancient Hurrian and Northwest Caucasian languages means Eagle a famous symbol for many West Asian and Hurrian people in the Middle East. Zan stands for the name of the people in Kartvelian languages. Many Hurrian people and tribes carry the Zan suffix in the end of their self denomination. Zan is also preserved in Iranian languages and means; life, woman. One of the original meanings of the word Zan is "born". In some Indo-European languages the word "son" is of the same root. Alternative names used are, "Arzini" with the Hurrian suffix of "ini" and Arzziani "ani" being the plural form of Arzini according to Hurri-Urartian grammar.

At the found cuneiform inscription in the vicinit of Arazin village, "the city of Arsini" s mentioned, which, resisted against the Urartu attack. Researchers suppose that the toponym of "Arsini" is related with the name of Arazin village near the slope of the Ilandağ Mount. Some researchers believe that, the name made on the base of the word of Araz (Aras River) and suffix -an (it is dropped to the form of -in after phonetic changing).

== History ==
Its local population has been Azerbaijanis. In the letter of A. S. Griboedov to the gen. I. Paskevich was recorded about resettlement of the Armenians to here from Iran and Turkey since 1828. According to the results of the population census cameral, launched in April 1829 and was ended in May 1832 by the leadership Ivan Ivanovich Chopin's, in the Arazin village of the Nakhchivan district of the Nakhchivan province of the Armenian Oblast (On March 16, 1828, according to the fifteenth paragraph of the Treaty of Turkmenchay, concluded on February 10, in 1828, the Armenians deported from Qajar Empire to the Azerbaijan), at 39 houses were lived 188 Armenians (91 men, 97 women) resettled to here from Iran.

== Historical and archaeological monuments ==
=== Arazin ===
Arazin - the medieval monument in the right side of the Nakhchivan-Arafsa highway, in the west from the same named village in the Julfa rayon. Its area is limited from the north-east and south-west by the Guruchay valley. Part of the monument discovered during construction works (1989) has been destroyed. A central part of the residence partly remained unharmed in 360 m2. At the result of the researches (1991), the surface materials (fragments of the labor tools, pieces of the glazed and unglazed ceramic pot in pink-colored, the baked brick, industrial waste, etc.) were discovered. In this part of the monument, the thickness of the cultural layer is preserved in 2 m. In the destroyed parts were found fire places filled with black ash. Among the findings, there is one hook made of copper.

=== Arazin Necropolis ===
Arazin Necropolis - the archaeological monument of the Middle Ages in the north-east from the same named village in the Julfa rayon, in the left side of the Arazin-Jamaldin highway. It is located on the top of the high hill. During archaeological researches was identified that the graves have been directed towards the north-west. The unhewn plate stones in square-shaped were laid on the graves. The gravestones are remained. It is supposed that the Arazin necropolis belongs to the 16th-18th centuries.
