= Argam Aivazian =

Armenian historian

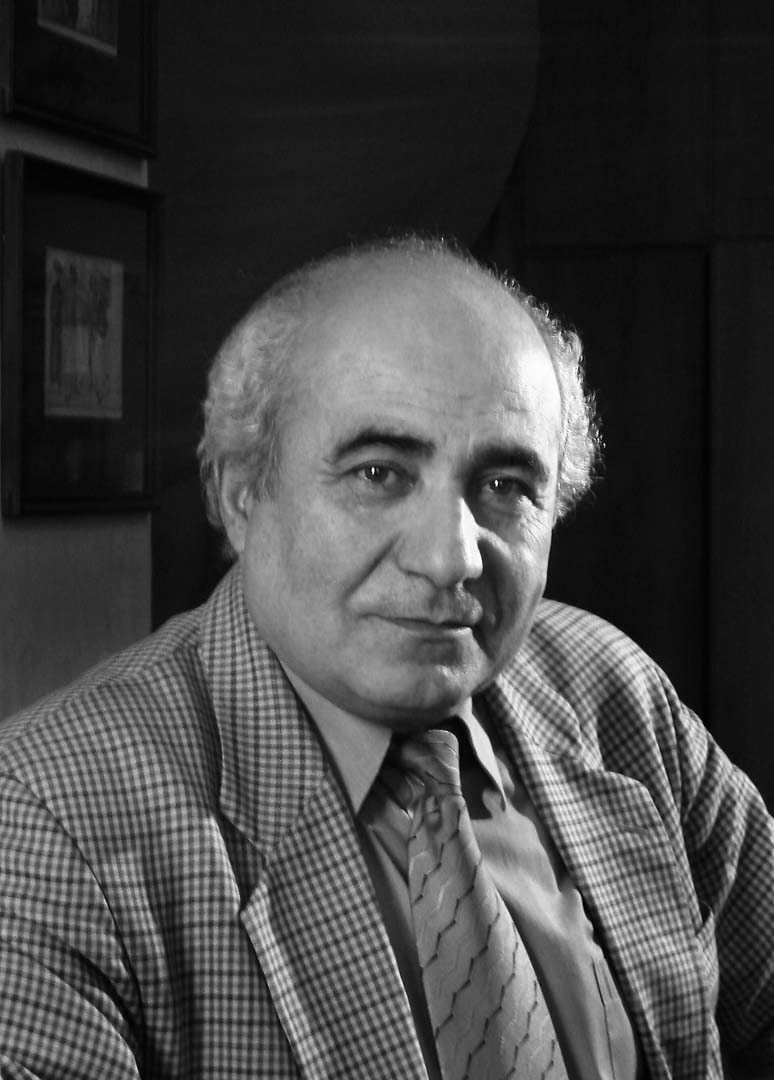
- Born: July 20, 1947; Arinj, Nakhichevan ASSR, Azerbaijan SSR, Soviet Union (now Ayrınc, Azerbaijan)
- Education: Armenian State Pedagogical University
- Awards: Boghossian Prize
- Scientific career
- Fields: History, archaeology
- Workplaces: Institute of Archeology and Ethnography of the Armenian National Academy of Sciences

Argam Ararati Aivazian (sometimes written Ayvazyan; Armenian: Արգամ Արարատի Այվազյան; born 20 July 1947) is an Armenian historian, journalist and researcher. Born in the village of Arinj in the Nakhichevan ASSR, he is particularly known for his books and monographs about the Armenian culture and history of that region, and has written books about the towns of Hin Jugha (Julfa) and Agulis, as well as more than 200 other works, mostly in Armenian.

== Biography ==
Argam Aivazian was born in 1947 the village of Arinj (Ayrınc) in the Nakhichevan Autonomous Soviet Socialist Republic of the Azerbaijan SSR (now located in the Nakhchivan Autonomous Republic of Azerbaijan). He went to grade school in his home village. He graduated from the Armenian State Pedagogical University in 1984.

Aivazian has worked at the Monument Protection Department of the Armenian SSR and the Art Institute of Armenian Academy of Sciences. His photographic archive contains over 10000 negatives. It is one of the largest documentary collections of historical Armenian architecture in the world.

From 1992 to 2000 he was a Senior Researcher at the Institute of Archeology and Ethnography of the Armenian National Academy of Sciences.

== Awards ==
- Honored Cultural Worker of Armenia (2009)
- Boghossian Prize (for the 6-volume book "The Lithographic Inheritance of Nakhidjevan", 2010)
- RA Presidential Award (2011)

== Selected works ==
- The Historical Monuments of Nakhichevan. Translated into English by Krikor H. Maksoudian. Detroit: Wayne State University Press, 1990, 152 p., ISBN 0-8143-1896-7.
- The khachkars of Nakhijevan . Published in English and Armenian. Yerevan, 1996.
- The Symphony of the Destroyed Jugha Khatchkars. Published in English, Russian, and Armenian. Yerevan, 2007.
- Nakhijevan: Map of Monuments. Yerevan, 2007.
- Djugha. In English and Russian. Yerevan: Hayastan Publishing, 1990.
- (in Armenian) "The Rock-Carvings of Navasar." Lraber Hasarakakan Gituyunneri, № 2, 1981.
- (in Armenian) Ջուղա (Jugha). Yerevan: Sovetakan Grogh, 1984.
- (in Armenian) Monumental Memorials and Reliefs of Nakhijevan. Yerevan, 1987.
- (in Armenian) The Art of Wall Painting in Nakhijevan. Yerevan, 1998.
- (in Armenian) Նախիջեւանի վիմագրական ժառանգութիւնը (The Lithographic Inheritance of Nakhidjevan). Two volumes. Antelias, 2005.
