= Kırna =

Village in Nakhchivan, Azerbaijan

Kyrna
- Municipality
- Azerbaijani: Kırna
- Location within Azerbaijan
- Coordinates: 39°08′12″N 45°39′16″E
- Country: Azerbaijan
- Autonomous republic: Nakhchivan
- District: Julfa

Population (2005)
  - Total: 1,326
- Time zone: UTC+4 (AZT)

Kırna (also, Kyrna, Kirnə, Kirna and Krna) is a village and municipality in the Julfa District of Nakhchivan, Azerbaijan. It is located 30 km in the north from the district center, on the left bank of the Alinjachay River, on the slope of the Zangezur ridge. Its population is busy with vine-growing, farming and animal husbandry. There are secondary school, cultural house, two libraries, kindergarten, communication branch, and a medical center in the village. It has a population of 1,326.

== Historical and archaeological monuments ==
=== Kyrna ===
Kyrna or Krna, a settlement site from the Middle Ages, is to the east of the modern village. The area is uneven and bordered by a high mountain range to the east and the Alinja (Ernjak) River to the west, with valleys to the north and south. Its total area is 3,700 square meters. Exploration and research were conducted in 1991. Currently, a large part of the area is covered with new buildings. The preserved part of the medieval settlement covers the hill and its foothills. There is a domed structure from the Middle Ages on the top of the hill. Surface materials mostly consist from the products of clay pots (the fragments of the glazed and unglazed clay pots), parts of bricks, grain stones. According to the findings, it is assumed that the Kirna settlement belongs to the 11th–17th centuries.

=== Ruined domed structure ===
On a hillside overlooking Kyrna village was an enigmatic ruined building. Constructed of brick, the surviving part had a square floor plan rising to an octagonal drum on the exterior, with the interior presumed to have been roofed by a large spherical dome (which had not survived). On the inside the eight faces of the drum turned into sixteen faces, and then into a circular base for the dome. Its presumed entrance façade had a large arched central portal flanked by two much narrower but equally tall arched portals. The structure had no surviving inscriptions.

The structure was on the 1988 list of Historical and Cultural Monuments of the Soviet Azerbaijan as a "mausoleum".

Argam Aivazian identifies it as an Armenian church, belonging to the Surp Astvadsadsin monastery, built in 1330 under the patronage of Gorg, prince of Krna, his wife Yeltik, and Hovhannes Krnetsi. This monastery was an important center for scriptorium production from the 14th to the 18th century.

Azerbaijani and former Soviet sources generally identify the structure as a mosque built in the 12th century, and call it the Kyrna Juma Mosque. Other researchers consider the monument to be a tomb.

The structure was still extant by 2001 and by November 11, 2009, the structure had been demolished and its traces removed from the site, as documented by investigation of the Caucasus Heritage Watch.

=== Kyrna Necropolis I ===
Kyrna Necropolis I - the archaeological monuments of the Middle Ages in the north from the same named village in the Julfa District. It is limited by the Alinja River in the west, with the soil road in the south, and with the deep canyon in the north-east. Exploration research work was carried out (1991). Necropolis is now being used by the local population. Medieval graves and the modern graves are mixed. The gravestones of the ancient graves were kept. There are images of birds and forked over some of the graves. The graves are surrounded in a group of large stones. Stone rows, mainly are in the rectangular plan. In the center of the Necropolis remains the ruins of tomb built from the mud-brick which covered the area about 5×5 m. It is supposed that the monument belongs to the 14th–18th centuries.

=== Kyrna Necropolis II ===
Kyrna Necropolis II - the archaeological monuments of the Middle Ages in the north from the same named village in the Julfa District. It is on the plain area, in the valley surrounded by high mountains from the north, east and south sides. Exploration research works was carried out (1991). According to information of the local population, at the necropolis were a lot of stone rams, but most of them were taken away. Currently, remained the three pieces of the stone ram hewed from the gray stone, but their head part were broken; one of them built on the rectangular base. It is supposed that the monument belongs to the 14th–16th centuries.

== See also ==
St. Astvatsatsin Monastery (Kyrna)
