= Bənəniyar =

- Municipality
- Location within Azerbaijan
- Coordinates: 39°08′47″N 45°39′05″E
- Country: Azerbaijan
- Autonomous republic: Nakhchivan
- District: Julfa
- Elevation: 1,120 m (3,670 ft)

Population (2005)
  - Total: 3,253
- Time zone: UTC+4 (AZT)

Bananiyar (Azerbaijani: Bənəniyar) or Aparanner (Armenian: Ապարաններ) is a village and municipality in the Julfa District of Nakhchivan, Azerbaijan. It is located 25 km in the north from the district center, on the right bank of the Alinja River, on the slope of the Syunik ridge.

The main economic activities of its population are viticulture, grain-growing and animal husbandry. It has a population of 3,253. There is a secondary school, cultural house, library, communication branch, and a medical center in the village. There is a medieval cemetery near the village. In the southern part of the village, there is a mosque.

== Etymology ==
The name of the village consists of the Turkic words bənən (meaning glade on the slope of the mountain) and yar (meaning ravine or valley). The name of the village can thus be interpreted as meaning "ravine on the neck of the mountain, the hollow place at the mountain pass". The geographical location of the village is suitable for this meaning. The historical Armenian name of the settlement, Aparanner/Aparank/Aparan, means palace(s).

== Bananiyar Cemetery ==
Bananiyar Cemetery - the medieval monument near the same-named village of the Julfa region, on the right bank of the Alinja River. It was registered in 1976. The necropolis consists of the soil graves in rectangular form, oriented from the west toward the east. In its area were found the gravestones in ram form of the Middle Ages made from red tuff; there are written articles in Arabic language on its top part. The cemetery belongs to the 13th–14th centuries BC.

== See also ==
- Tigranakert (Nakhchivan), ancient Armenian city located close to the village
