= Nakhchivan State Musical Dramatic Theatre =

Professional theatre in Nakhchivan, Azerbaijan

Nakhchivan State Musical Dramatic Theatre is a professional music and drama theater located in Nakhchivan, Azerbaijan.

== History ==
The theater was built in 1883 by “Muslim Art and Drama society”. First play set in the theater was "Musyo Jordan and Dervish Mastali Shah Kaduk", the work of Mirza Fatali Akhundzade. It gave a start to the series of staged performances of Mirza Fatali Akhundzade in Nakhchivan Music and Drama Theater such as “Molla Ibrahim Khalil alchemist".

Other famous performances such as "Lieutenant of Lankaran Khanate", "Haji Kara" comedy, "Musibasi-Fakhraddin" by N.Vazirov, "Daglan Tifaq" by A.Hagverdiyev, and “Nadir Shah" by Nariman Narimanov were also staged in Nakhchivan Music and Drama theater.

In 1922, Nakhchivan Music and Drama theater got status of State Theater. In 1965, theater was renamed in honor of Jalil Mammadguluzade.

In 2008, theater was widely celebrating its 125th anniversary. In 2012, theater was rebuilt and renovated according to modern standards.

== See also ==
- Azerbaijan State Academic National Drama Theatre
