= Dəstə =

- Municipality
- Location within Azerbaijan
- Coordinates: 38°53′00″N 45°54′40″E
- Country: Azerbaijan
- Autonomous republic: Nakhchivan
- District: Ordubad

Population (2005)
  - Total: 4,313
- Time zone: UTC+4 (AZT)

Dəstə (also, Deste, Dasta and Dastamal) is a village and the most populous municipality, after the capital Ordubad, in the Ordubad District of Nakhchivan, Azerbaijan. It is located in the near of the Ordubad-Nakhchivan highway, 12 km in the south-east from the district center, on the left bank of the Aras river. People of the village is busy with gardening, vegetable-growing, farming. There are two secondary school, two library, club, communication branch, kindergarten and hospital in the village. It has a population of 4,313.

== History ==
During the period of late antiquity, Dəstə, known by the Armenian name of Dasta (Դաստա; also, Dastak, Դաստակ), was an Armenian-populated village in the Kingdom of Armenia and was administratively a part of the province of Vaspurakan's district of Goght'n. In later centuries, its Armenian population emigrated and settled in nearby settlements, especially Agulis and Shusha.

In the early twentieth century, it had a population of about 1,500, most of whom were Muslims. By 1971, its population had risen to 4,500.

The remains of two partially destroyed Armenian churches were still preserved at the end of the Soviet period.
