= Ayrınc =

- Municipality
- Location within Azerbaijan
- Coordinates: 39°25′41″N 45°35′11″E
- Country: Azerbaijan
- Autonomous republic: Nakhchivan
- District: Shahbuz

Population (2005)
  - Total: 546
- Time zone: UTC+4 (AZT)

Ayrınc (also Ayrynj, Ayrindzh until 2003) or Arinj (Armenian: Առինջ, romanized: Aṙinǰ) is a village and municipality in the Shahbuz District of Nakhchivan, Azerbaijan. It is located near the Shahbuz-Kyukyu highway, 3 km in the north from the district center, on the bank of the Kukuchay river (tributary of the Nakhchivanchay river). Its population is busy with gardening and animal husbandry.

There are a secondary school, a library, a club, a kindergarten and a medical center in the village. It has a population of 546. The Nohur settlement of the Middle Ages is located nearby.

== Etymology and History ==
In the Turkic languages, Arynj means "hard, reverse, rigid, boring". Azerbaijani sources state that the name was created due to the harsh climate of the available area. Since 2003, the name of the village has officially been registered as Ayrınc for an unknown reason. In the beginning of the 18th century, the Arynja village was registered in the district of Girkhbulag.

The Armenian name for the city, Arinj (Առինջ), is an alternative form of the Old Armenian word arij (առիճ), meaning village.

According to Azerbaijani sources, the local population were deported from the Arnyj village of the Yeghegnadzor region of Armenia in 1948–50.

According to Armenian sources, the Armenian population of the village was expelled by Azerbaijanis during inter-ethnic conflicts in the 1970s and 1980s moved to several surrounding settlements of Yerevan, eventually founding the suburb of the same name in Armenia's Kotayk Province just outside of the capital.

== Archaeological monuments ==
=== Nohur ===
Nohur is the place of residence of the 11-14 centuries, near the Ayrınc village of the Shahbuz rayon, on the left bank of the Ayrınc River. Its area is 1000 m^{2}. The remains of the building are observed in the settlement. The houses built of hewn limestones are the square and rectangular. During the research work in one of the rooms (6х4 m) ceramic products have been found both unglazed (fragments of jug and jar-type containers in the pink and yellowish colored) and glazed (bowl, plate fractures).

=== Ayrınc Necropolis ===
The Ayrınc Necropolis is another archaeological monument of the Middle Ages in the Ayrınc village of the Shahbuz rayon. Only a part of the figure of a ram and a part of the head stones of the graves are remained in the Muslim cemetery. The upper part of the two head stones has been engraved in a similar to the crown. One of these two figures of the simple form rams is spiral-horned. Researchers assume that the monument belongs to the 15-16 centuries.
