= Mərdangöl necropolis =

Historical site in Azerbaijan

Mərdangöl necropolis— is a historical site located in Kharabagilan, Ordubad of Nakhchivan, Azerbaijan. The structure of grave monuments in the Mərdangöl necropolis is similar to the findings in the Khalikeshan necropolis located in the Orduban district of the Nakhchivan. During the excavation of the tombs, gray and pink ceramic vessels were found. Painted dishes are in the minority. During the excavations, fragments of iron objects, bronze ornaments and a large number of beads were also found. Among the beads are cylindrical seals made of white stone. Researchers have identified the Mardangol necropolis in BC. It belongs to IX-VIII centuries. Archaeological research conducted here is important in terms of studying the history of the Middle Ages in the South Caucasus.
