= Khachaparakh =

- Location within Azerbaijan
- Coordinates: 39°11′50″N 45°35′01″E
- Country: Azerbaijan
- Autonomous republic: Nakhchivan
- District: Ordubad
- Time zone: UTC+4 (AZT)
  - Summer (DST): UTC+5 (AZT)

Khachaparakh is a necropolis in the Ordubad District of the Nakhchivan Autonomous Republic of Azerbaijan.
