= Church of Nerkin Ankuzik (Ashaghykand) =

Armenian church in Nakhchivan, Azerbaijan

- Church of Nerkin Ankuzik
- 39.209085°N 45.734169°E
- Location: Ashaghykand
- Country: Azerbaijan
- Denomination: Armenian Apostolic Church

History
- Status: Destroyed
- Founded: 11-12th centuries

Architecture
- Style: basilica
- Demolished: October 7, 2001 – November 11, 2009

The Church of Nerkin Ankuzik was a ruinous Armenian church located in the abandoned Nerkin Ankuzik or Ashaghykand village (Julfa District) of the Nakhchivan Autonomous Republic of Azerbaijan. The church was located in the northern part of the abandoned village.

== History ==
The church was founded in the 11–12th centuries and renovated several times. The last time it was renovated in the 17th century.

== Architecture ==
The church was a basilica structure with a polygonal apse, two vestries, and a hall.

== Destruction ==
The apse and foundation of the church were still intact as of October 7, 2001. However, by November 11, 2009, the church had been razed, its building stones removed, and the site bulldozed, as documented by investigation of the Caucasus Heritage Watch.
