= Pəzməri =

- Municipality
- Location within Azerbaijan
- Coordinates: 39°01′59″N 46°00′52″E
- Country: Azerbaijan
- Autonomous republic: Nakhchivan
- District: Ordubad

Population (2005)
  - Total: 158
- Time zone: UTC+4 (AZT)

Pəzməri (also, Pazmari and Pezmeri) is a village and municipality in the Ordubad District of Nakhchivan, Azerbaijan. It is located near the Ordubad-Unus highway, 37 km (23 mi) north-west from the district center. Its population primarily works in gardening, vegetable-growing, beekeeping and animal husbandry. There are a secondary school, club, library and a medical center in the village. It has a population of 158.

== Etymology ==
The name of the village is from the word pəzməri ('block, a part of the village') from the Nakhchivan dialect.
