= Five Martyrs of Persia =

Christians and martyrs

- Died: 4th century
- Means of martyrdom: Beheaded
- Venerated in: Eastern Orthodoxy
- Feast: 6 June

The Five Martyrs of Persia, also known as the Five Sisters of Persia or the Five Virgins of Persia, are a group of Christian women who are believed to have been martyred during the reign of Shapur II (309-379).

Their memory is commemorated on 6 June in the Eastern Orthodox Church.

== Sources and studies ==
The lives of the Five Martyrs of Persia are known through Syriac and Greek sources. However, the history of their hagiography and life has remained quite complicated to establish for a long time, given that there are regional traditions of these same saints that are somewhat altered. For instance, on the island of Crete, the regional tradition is said to have "Cretized" the story by simply changing the locations involved in the narrative to Cretan places.

Regarding the exact names of the saints, Sebastian Brock provides the following comparisons:

- Syriac: Thecla, Mariam, Martha, Mariam, Emmi (or Amai)
- Greek (Synaxarion): Thecla, Mariamne, Martha, Maria, Enneim
- Greek (Krētōn Hagioi): Martha, Maria, Ennatha, Thecla, Mariamne
- Greek (Synaxarists): Thecla, Mariamne, Martha, Maria, Ennatha
- Greek (from Spanakès): Thecla, Mariamna, Aithana, Martha, Maria

He further argues that the use of "Mariamne" in the Greek names is intentional, to avoid duplicating "Mariam", as in the original Syriac. The name "Emmi" is a hapax legomenon in Syriac literature, meaning literally "my mother".

== Biography ==
According to the hagiographical accounts concerning them, the five martyrs are said to have lived near the village of Aza during the Sassanian Empire. The five women were likely monastics or, at the very least, women living a monastic life of chastity and prayer; in some hagiographies, they are described as virgins. They were believed to be under the spiritual guidance of a certain Paul, who was said to be a priest as well as a wealthy and greedy man. The five Christian women reportedly distributed all their possessions and entrusted them to him, but he chose to keep everything for himself.

Some countrymen become aware of Paul’s wealth, informed by a Nerses, and threatened to kill all six of them if the group did not renounce their belief in Jesus Christ. Paul, renounced his belief in order to remain safe. The five women, however, refused to abjure their Christian faith and were beheaded by Paul. Paul was thrown into a river the next day.

== Celebrations ==
Their memory has been commemorated since ancient times on 6 June in the Eastern Orthodox Church More recently, the date of 9 June has also been noted.
