= Church of Hin Poradasht =

Armenian church in Nakhchivan, Azerbaijan

Coordinates: 39.178597°N 45.764608°E

- Church of Hin Poradasht
- Location: Hin Poradasht
- Country: Azerbaijan
- Denomination: Armenian Apostolic Church

History
- Status: Destroyed

Architecture
- Demolished: October 7, 2001 – November 11, 2009

The Church of Hin Poradasht was an Armenian church located in the abandoned Hin Poradasht village (Julfa District) of the Nakhchivan Autonomous Republic of Azerbaijan.

== History ==
The church was renovated in the 17th century.

== Architecture ==
The church was a vaulted structure with a bema built 45–50 cm above the floor, an apse in the east with two-storied vestries on either side (with secret passageways leading to the hall) and an entrance in the west.

== Destruction ==
The church was in a ruinous condition in the late Soviet period in ruins with its walls reaching up to 2.5 meters and covered in vegetation.

The ruins of the church were still standing on October 7, 2001, however, by November 11, 2009, it was razed to ground; amidst the ruins of the abandoned Hin Poradasht village, the church alone was targeted for erasure, as documented by investigation of the Caucasus Heritage Watch.
