= Vələver =

- Municipality
- Location within Azerbaijan
- Coordinates: 38°57′07″N 45°55′36″E
- Country: Azerbaijan
- Autonomous republic: Nakhchivan
- District: Ordubad

Population (2005)
  - Total: 468
- Time zone: UTC+4 (AZT)

Vələver (also, Valaver) is a village and municipality in the Ordubad District of Nakhchivan, Azerbaijan. It is located 27 km in the north-east from the district center, on the slope of the Zangezur ridge. Its population is busy with gardening, vegetable-growing and animal husbandry. There are secondary school, library, club and a medical center in the village. It has a population of 468.

== Etymology ==
The name of the village made out from the components of the Turkic words of vələ (hilly) and ver (upper, top) means "the hilly place, altitude".
