= Baş Dizə =

- Municipality
- Location within Azerbaijan
- Coordinates: 38°59′06″N 45°50′01″E
- Country: Azerbaijan
- Autonomous republic: Nakhchivan
- District: Ordubad

Population (2005)
  - Total: 483
- Time zone: UTC+4 (AZT)

Baş Dizə (also, Bash Diza and Bashdiza) is a village and municipality in the Ordubad District of Nakhchivan, Azerbaijan. It is located 25 km in the west from the district center, on the left bank of the Aras River. It has a population of 483. Its population is busy with gardening, farming and animal husbandry. There are secondary school, club and a medical center in the village. In the cemetery of its territory, there were the stone ram sculptures of the Middle Ages over graves.
