= Azadkənd, Nakhchivan =

Azadkənd
- Municipality
- Location within Azerbaijan
- Coordinates: 38°55′07″N 45°49′34″E
- Country: Azerbaijan
- Autonomous republic: Nakhchivan
- District: Ordubad

Population (2005)
  - Total: 1,054
- Time zone: UTC+4 (AZT)

Azadkənd (until 2003, Aşağı Aza and Ashagy Aza "Lower Aza") is a village and municipality in the Ordubad District of Nakhchivan, Azerbaijan. It is located in the left side of the Ordubad-Nakhchivan highway, 20 km in the south-west from the district center, on the right bank of the Gilanchay River (tributary of Aras River). Its population is busy with gardening, vegetable-growing, farming, vine-growing, poultry farming and animal husbandry. There are secondary school, club, hospital and kindergarten in the village. It has a population of 1,054.

== Etymology ==
Azad آزاد is a Persian word meaning 'Free'. Kand or kənd کند in Persian and some other Iranian languages means 'village'. This word is derived from Persian verb کندن 'Kandan' which means 'to dig up'. Azadkand's meaning is thus 'The Free Village'. The former name of the village, Aşağı (lower) Aza means "Aza village which located in the down side". Since 2003, the name of the village is officially registered as Azadkənd. At the various sources, this settlement is described as a small town in versions of Aza, Azar, Azat, Azad. In the location of the same city is now located, two villages of Aza and Azadkand.

== History ==
Azad was an ancient Armenian city. According to sources, it was located about 20 km from the city of Ordubad, on the bank of Gilanchay river. In the 11th-12th centuries, the city had maintained trade relations with the countries of the Near and Middle East. Iranian historian Hamdollah Mostowfi (1281-1350) and others have informed about Azad. Hamdollah Mostowfi wrote in his book "Nezhatol Qoloub": "Azad is small town which gained fame with corn, grapes and cotton products. The vineyards of this place are very famous. The city's water comes from the Kapan mountains and excesses flows to the Aras River... The population are whitish Armenians and jews-zoki.... ". The researchers are identified the connection between geographical positions of Azad with present Azad and Aza villages. The formation of the villages Azad and Aza, likely has connect with decay of the city. From the Persian-language documents, it is clear that in the beginning of the 18th century, one of the villages was called "Azadbədəli", another one was "Azadcayı". The important trade routes to European countries had passed through from Azad. In the Middle Ages, the craftsmanship, trade, viticulture, wine-making were developed in the Azad. The city was most likely destroyed during the Mongols invasion.

=== Aza Bridge ===
Aza Bridge is the architectural monument of the 17th century, in the village of Aza of Ordubad District, on the Gilanchay river. The width of the bridge, linking the village of Aza with Darkənd is 35m, the length is 46 pagonameters. The bridge has five spans. It was built with local reddish colored hewn mountain stone. When the bridge was built, the area of the bridge were taken into account and distance between the arches were made in various sizes. There are four wave-cutter arches. Located over an important trade-caravan route connecting India and China with countries of Europe Aza Bridge, was built in the period of the Shah Abbas I (1587-1629) ruler of the Safavid, in order to facilitate the work of the trade caravans moving from east to west and vice versa with the Great Silk Road. With the trade caravans which passed from here were exported the local products, including dried fruits, handicraft products, silk. As a result of some historical events and natural disasters the bridge was repeatedly destroyed, then was repaired. Due to tearing down a portion of the bridge by severe flood waters, it was substantially restored and reconstructed in 1997. At present, in order to go to the Azadkənd from Nakhchivan and Ordubad, the population and vehicles use this bridge.
