= Parağaçay =

- Municipality
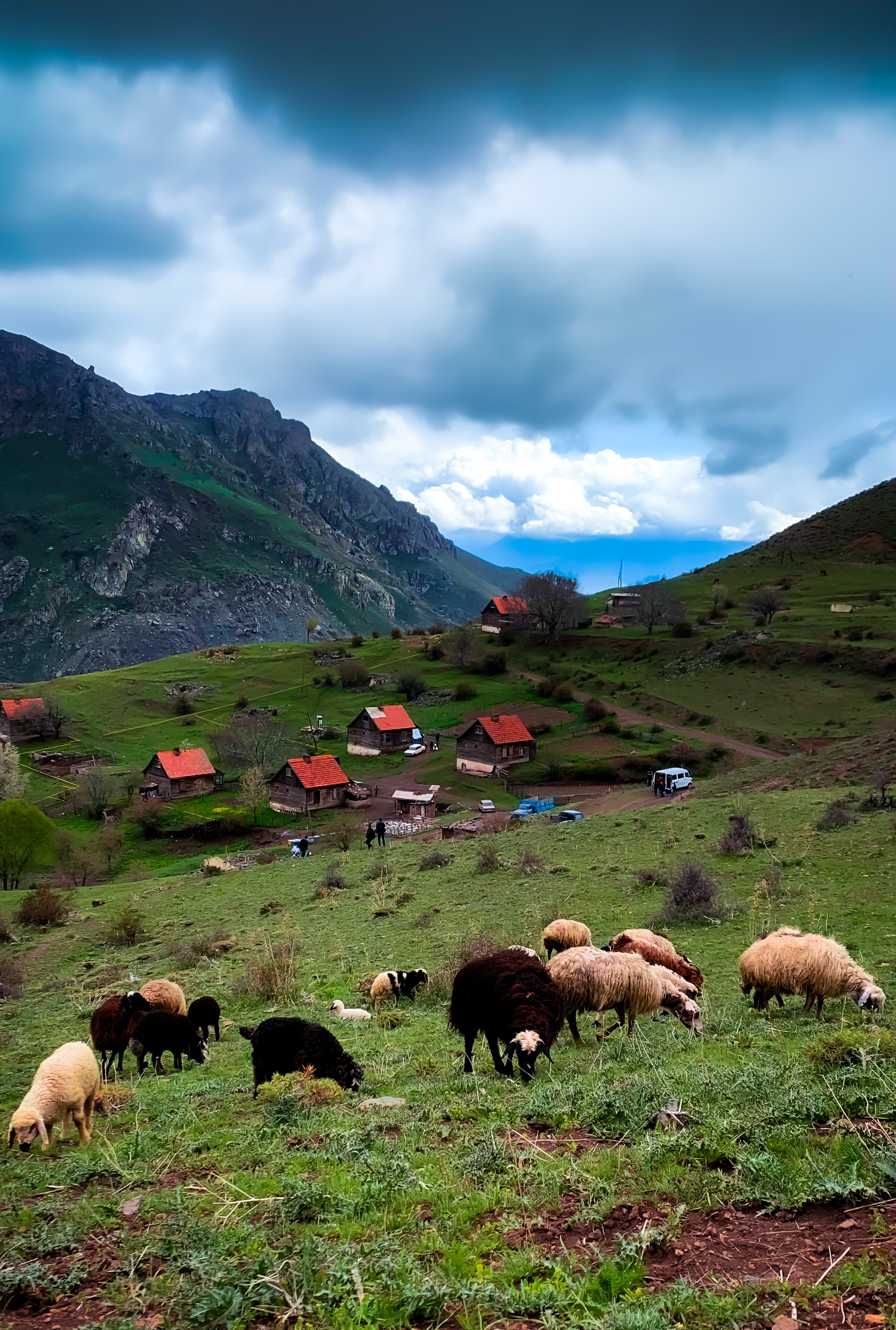

- Location within Azerbaijan
- Coordinates: 39°05′48″N 45°56′15″E
- Country: Azerbaijan
- Autonomous republic: Nakhchivan
- District: Ordubad

Population (2000)
  - Total: 102
- Time zone: UTC+4 (AZT)

Parağaçay (also, Paragachay) is an urban-type settlement and the least populous municipality in the Ordubad District of Nakhchivan, Azerbaijan. It is located in the west of the Ordubad-Tivi highway, 52 km in the north-east from the district center, on the right bank of the Gilanchay River, at the slope of the Zangezur ridge. Its population is busy with gardening, vegetable-growing and animal husbandry. It has a population of 102.

== Etymology ==
The settlement which was built in connection with production of molybdenum in 1939, got its name from the river which flows near the village. And the name of the Paragachay River is related with the name of the Parağa (Paragha) village and means river which flows through the Paragha village. According to some researchers, the name of the Parağa village made from the components of the Turkic word of para (village) and Persian word of gah (location) meaning the place of the village or the place on the other bank. In the dialect of the Nakhchivan of the Azerbaijani language, the word parağa means foothill of the mountain, slope of the mountain, and this is related with the geographical location of the settlement.

== Paraghachay Molybdenum Field ==
Paraghachay Molybdenum Field is in the Ordubad region, 2300–2800 m above the sea level. It occupies the central part of the same named ore area. In its geological structure are gabbro-diorite and diorite, as well as the lamprofir and diorite-porfrits. The mineralization of copper-molybdenum, is the type of the vein and vein zones; 280⁰–310⁰ north-west and 60⁰–20⁰ north-east of the direction is related with deterioration. It is known the significant of exploitation vein of the quartz-molybdenum at the field. The main ore minerals: pyrite, khalkopyt, molybdenite. According to the signs of texture, the ores are strip-shaped. The field has been given to the exploitation since 1952, at present its operation was stopped.
