= Nissan Terra =

Mid-size SUV produced by Nissan

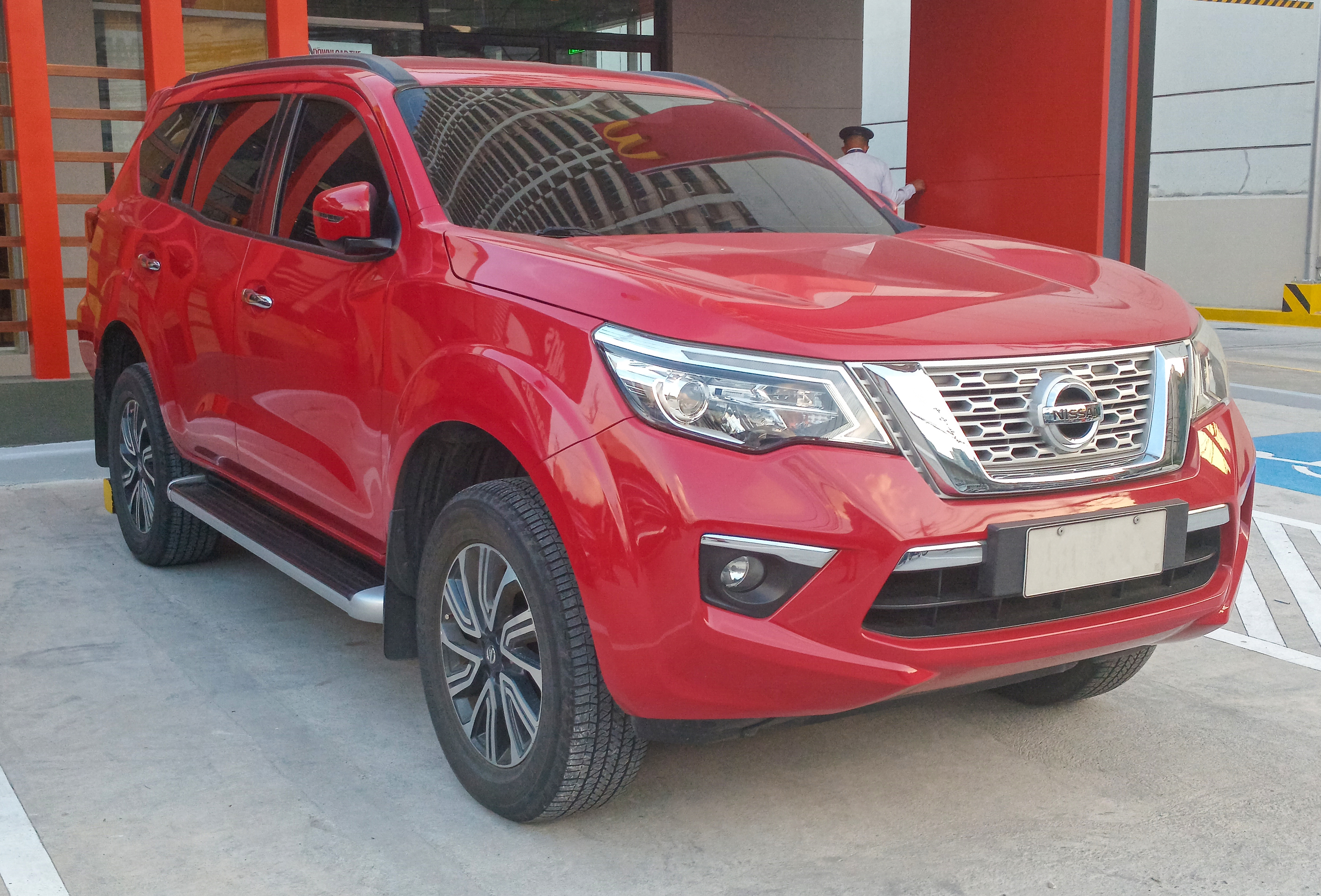
- Nissan Terra 2.5 VE (pre-facelift, Philippines)

Overview
- Manufacturer: Nissan
- Model code: WD23
- Also called: Nissan Paladin (China, facelift); Nissan X-Terra (Middle East and Costa Rica, facelift); Galloper Gredos (Spain); Nissan Terra MX8 (Iran); Nissan Terra (Iran)
- Production: 2018–present
- Assembly: Thailand: Samut Prakan (Nissan Motor Thailand); China: Zhengzhou (Dongfeng Nissan); Iran: Jolfa (Ista Motor Aras); Iran: Abyek (Maanian Khodro)
- Designer: Masato Takahashi; Masanobu Ino

Body and chassis
- Class: Mid-size SUV
- Body style: 5-door SUV
- Layout: Front-engine, rear-wheel-drive; Front-engine, four-wheel-drive
- Platform: Nissan F-Alpha platform
- Chassis: Body-on-frame
- Related: Nissan Navara (D23); Mercedes-Benz X-Class; Renault Alaskan; Dongfeng Rich/Ruiqi 6/7

Powertrain
- Engine: Petrol: 2.0 L 4K31TD turbo I4; 2.5 L QR25DE I4; Diesel: 2.3 L YS23DDTT twin-turbo I4; 2.5 L YD25DDTi turbo I4
- Power output: 168 kW (225 hp; 228 PS) (2.0L petrol); 134 kW (180 hp; 182 PS) (2.5L petrol); 123 kW (165 hp; 167 PS) (2.5L petrol, Middle East); 140 kW (188 hp; 190 PS) (2.3L, 2.5L diesel)
- Transmission: 6-speed manual; Jatco 7-speed automatic; ZF 8-speed automatic

Dimensions
- Wheelbase: 2,850 mm (112.2 in)
- Length: 4,825–4,840 mm (190.0–190.6 in)
- Width: 1,850–1,865 mm (72.8–73.4 in)
- Height: 1,835–1,845 mm (72.2–72.6 in)

Chronology
- Predecessor: Nissan Pathfinder (R51); Nissan Xterra/Paladin

The Nissan Terra is a mid-size SUV manufactured by Nissan. It was launched to the public at the April 2018 Auto China. The Terra is positioned in size between the X-Trail/Rogue compact crossover and Patrol/Armada full-size SUV. The Terra also fills the position left by the R51 series Pathfinder that sold between 2005 and 2012 and replaces the Paladin in China. The name "Terra" is Latin for "earth".

== Overview ==
=== Development ===
In 2011, when the development of the D23 Navara started, Nissan was considering to develop an SUV based on the Navara as the successor for the Paladin. At the early phase of the development, Nissan executives aimed the car for the growing Chinese and Middle East market. However, the development was halted between 2014 and 2015 as executives were undecided with the new SUV position segment-wise, with the popular X-Trail sitting very close to the aimed segment.

The Terra had been planned to be launched in 2016, however several constraints in its development delayed its launch. In 2015, segment competitors including Toyota Fortuner, Mitsubishi Pajero Sport, and Ford Everest had their new generation launched, which delayed the development in order to evaluate and improve the details of the Terra to be able to compete. The development was also constrained by a new excise tax structure based on emissions introduced by the Thai government, which forced Nissan to engineer the cleaner YS23DDTT diesel engine to the Terra. As a result, the Terra release was delayed by two years. The official details of the vehicle were eventually revealed on 15 March 2018 and was unveiled in the following month.

According to Pedro Deanda, chief product specialist that supervised the development of the vehicle, the Terra shares the front door panels, front hood bonnet and the door handles with the D23 Navara. The chassis and suspension was re-engineered to be shorter for comfort and maneuverability. Like the Navara, the Terra uses an independent double wishbone front suspension and a five-link coil-sprung rear suspension with live/solid rear axle.

=== Engines ===
The Terra originally had three engine options: a 2.5 L QR25DE I4 petrol engine that produces 134 kW (180 hp; 182 PS) at 6,000 rpm and 251 N⋅m (185 lbf⋅ft) of torque at 4,000 rpm, a 2.3 L twin-turbocharged YS23DDTT or 2.5 L YD25DDTi I4 diesel engines that both produce 140 kW (188 hp; 190 PS) at 3,600 rpm or 3,750 rpm and 450 N⋅m (330 lbf⋅ft) of torque at 2,000 rpm or 1,500–2,500 rpm respectively. The engines are mated to a 6-speed manual or 7-speed automatic transmission. The ground clearance is measured at 225 mm (8.9 in).

=== Dongfeng production ===
The Terra was launched in China in April 2018 produced by Zhengzhou Nissan as the successor of the Paladin in China. In 2023, news of the rebadged pre-facelift Nissan Terra for the Chinese market surfaced. While still being produced by Zhengzhou Nissan, the rebadged Terra is rebranded the Dongfeng Paladin, also known as the Oting Paladin, sold under the Dongfeng brand. It has a turbocharged 4K31T petrol direct injection engine with 168 kW (228 PS; 225 hp), built by Shenyang Aerospace Mitsubishi.

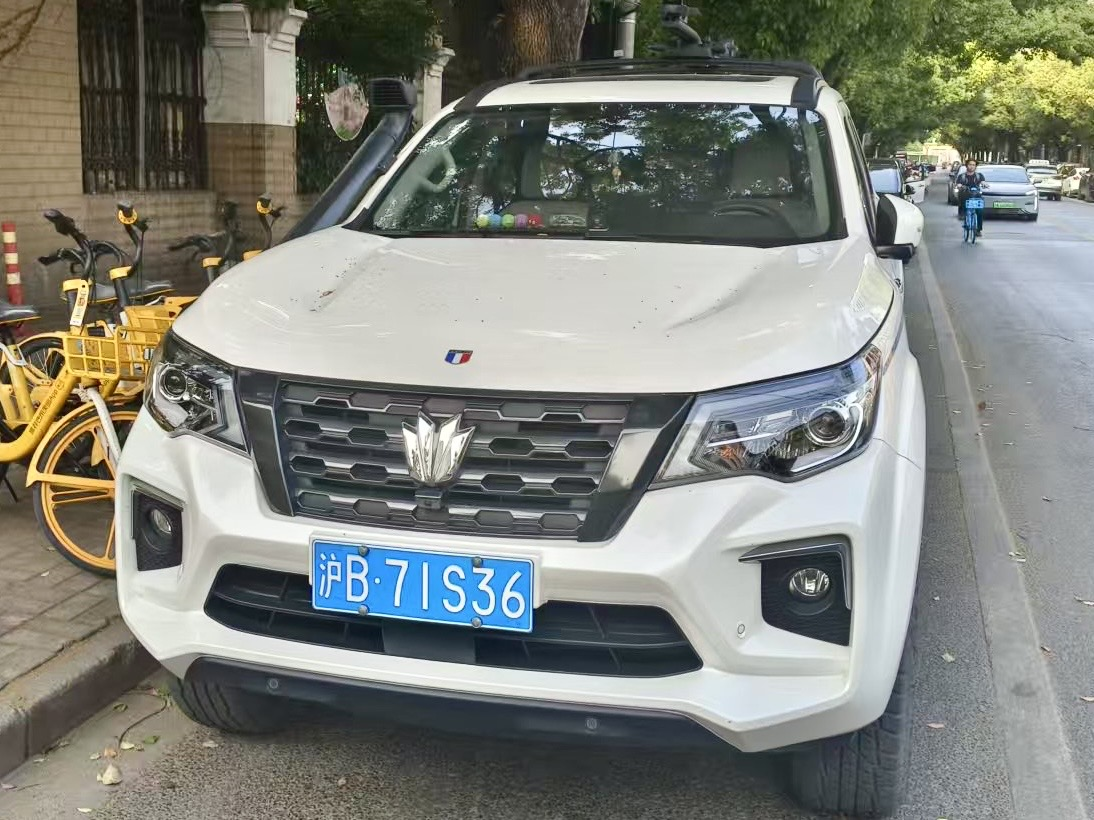
Fengdu Paladin Front end badging

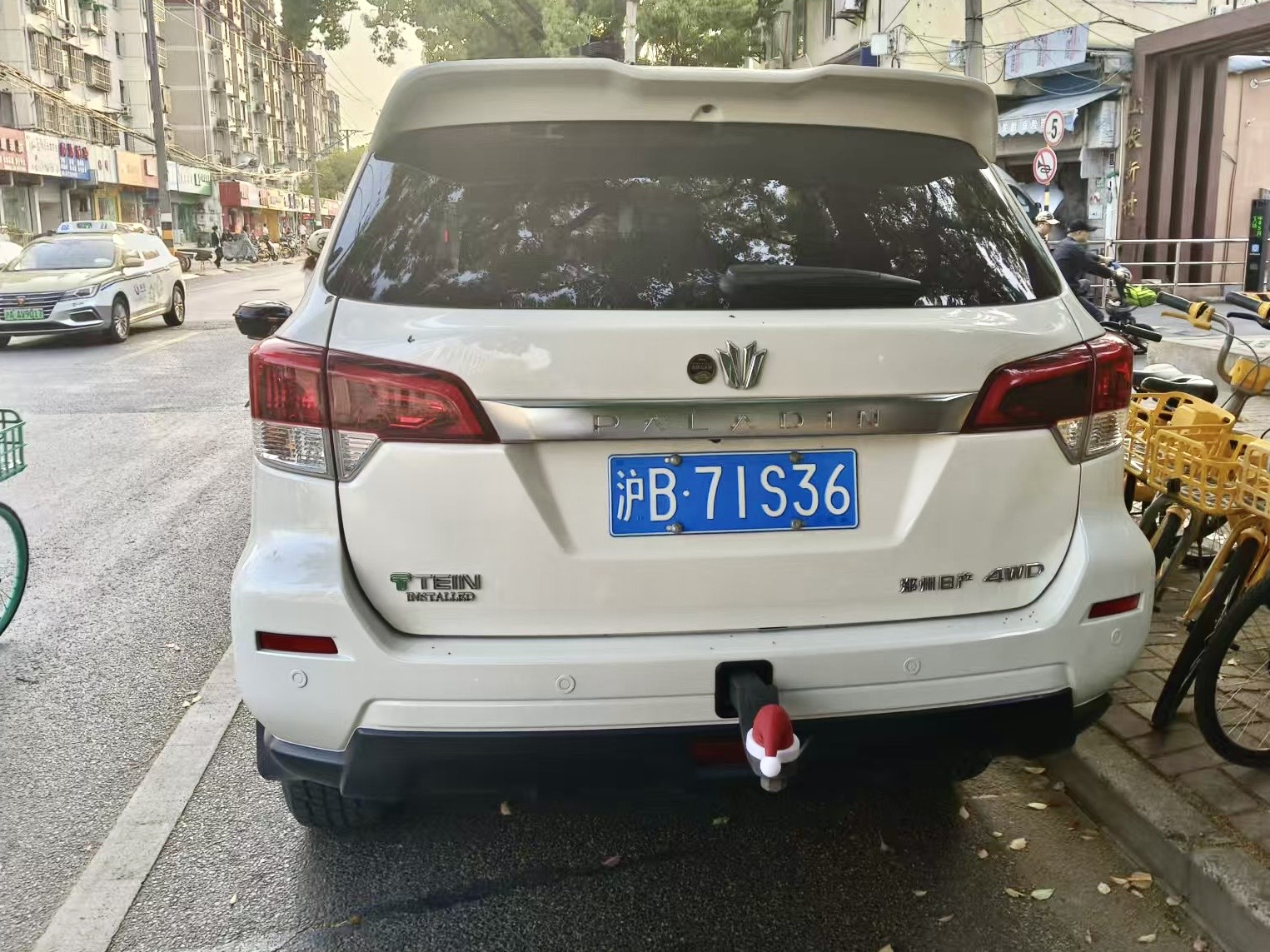
Fengdu Paladin rear quarter view

=== Markets ===
==== Asia ====
===== Brunei =====
In the Brunei market, the Terra was launched in early 2019, and it is offered in Mid, High, and Premium models. The Terra comes with only a 2.5-litre diesel engine (all trims), 7-speed automatic (High and Premium) or 6-speed manual (Mid), tire-pressure monitoring system (Premium), around-view monitor (Premium), 18-inch rims (High and Premium), 17-inch rims (Mid), hill-descent control (Premium) and 6 airbags for all trims. It received a facelift on 26 December 2021 with two variants: 2.5 High and 2.5 4WD Premium, both powered by a 2.5-litre turbodiesel engine with a 7-speed automatic.

===== Indonesia =====
The Terra was launched in Indonesia on 2 August 2018 at the 26th Gaikindo Indonesia International Auto Show. Imported from Thailand, it came with the similar specs as the Philippine version. The import was temporarily suspended between 2020 and 2022 due to low sales. 2,757 units were sold before the import suspension.

The facelifted Terra was introduced on 11 August 2022 at the 29th Gaikindo Indonesia International Auto Show, after a nearly three-year hiatus, while sales began on 10 March 2023 after being launched at the 2nd Gaikindo Jakarta Auto Week.

===== Iran =====
The Fengdu Paladin was introduced as the Leo-MX8 in February 2022, with local assembly by Ista Motor Aras starting in mid-2023. It has the 8-speed ZF automatic transmission, the Mitsubishi 4K31 engine, and two-wheel drive. The Ista Motor-built car was later renamed the Terra MX-8. In 2024, Persia Khodro started parallel production of it under the name of Manian Terra, fitted with the pre-facelift front clip. Persia Khodro advertises it as a "Nissan Terra" bin spite of its Chinese origins.

===== Middle East =====
The facelifted Terra was launched in GCC markets on 25 November 2020 as the X-Terra. It also underwent a major update on the front fascia, rear fascia, and dashboard design. The GCC market X-Terra is offered in SE, Titanium, and Platinum trim levels, all of which are powered by a 2.5-litre QR25DE petrol engine.

===== New Caledonia (Overseas France) =====
The Terra is currently on sale, as of May 2024, in this sui generis French Overseas Collectivity. It is the only place in the entire French Republic where the Terra can be purchased officially.

===== Philippines =====
On 28 May 2018, the Terra was launched in the Philippines. It gets a 2.5-litre diesel engine option. Compared to the Chinese version, it is 15 mm (0.6 in) wider, 3 mm (0.1 in) longer and seats 7 (compared to 5). It is offered in five trim options.

The facelifted Terra was released on 1 September 2021.

===== Thailand =====
The Terra was launched in Thailand on 16 August 2018. It uses the 2.3 L diesel engine option to comply with Thailand's excise tax structure. The 2.3-liter engine, YS23DDTT produces less CO_{2} pollution than the 2.5 L YD25DDTi engine, precisely 196 g/km which is lower than the 200 g/km limit regulated by the Thai government to get a 5% tax incentive.

The facelifted Terra was also launched in Thailand on 19 August 2021. With this facelift, it received upgraded safety and tech.

==== Europe ====
===== Spain =====
In Spain, the Dongfeng Paladin is imported and sold as the Galloper Gredos since 2026. The name ties in to the South Korean Galloper SUVs from the 1990s. The company plans to eventually assemble cars in Spain from semi-knocked down kits (SKD) as well.

===== Russia =====
In April 2023, the Paladin was sold in the Russian market. The vehicle is marketed by Sinotech Automobile.

==== Americas ====
===== Costa Rica =====
The Terra was unveiled as the X-Terra alongside the Versa and Kait in April 2026.

=== Safety ===
ASEAN NCAP test results Nissan Terra (2018)
Test	Points
Overall:	5 /5 stars
Adult occupant:	44.70
Child occupant:	20.79
Safety assist:	17.69

== Gallery ==
Pre-facelift

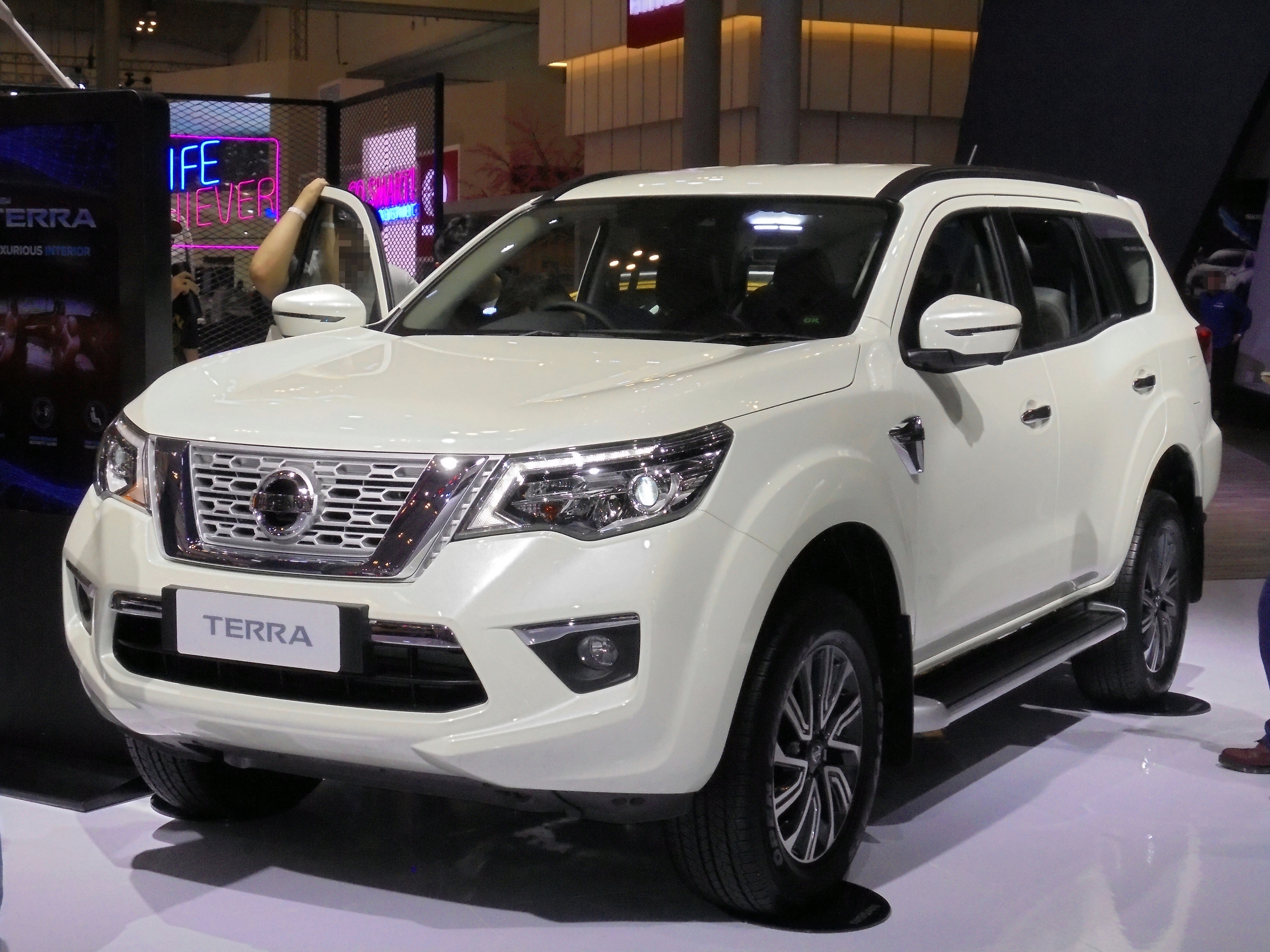
2019 Terra 2.5 VL 4x2 (Indonesia)

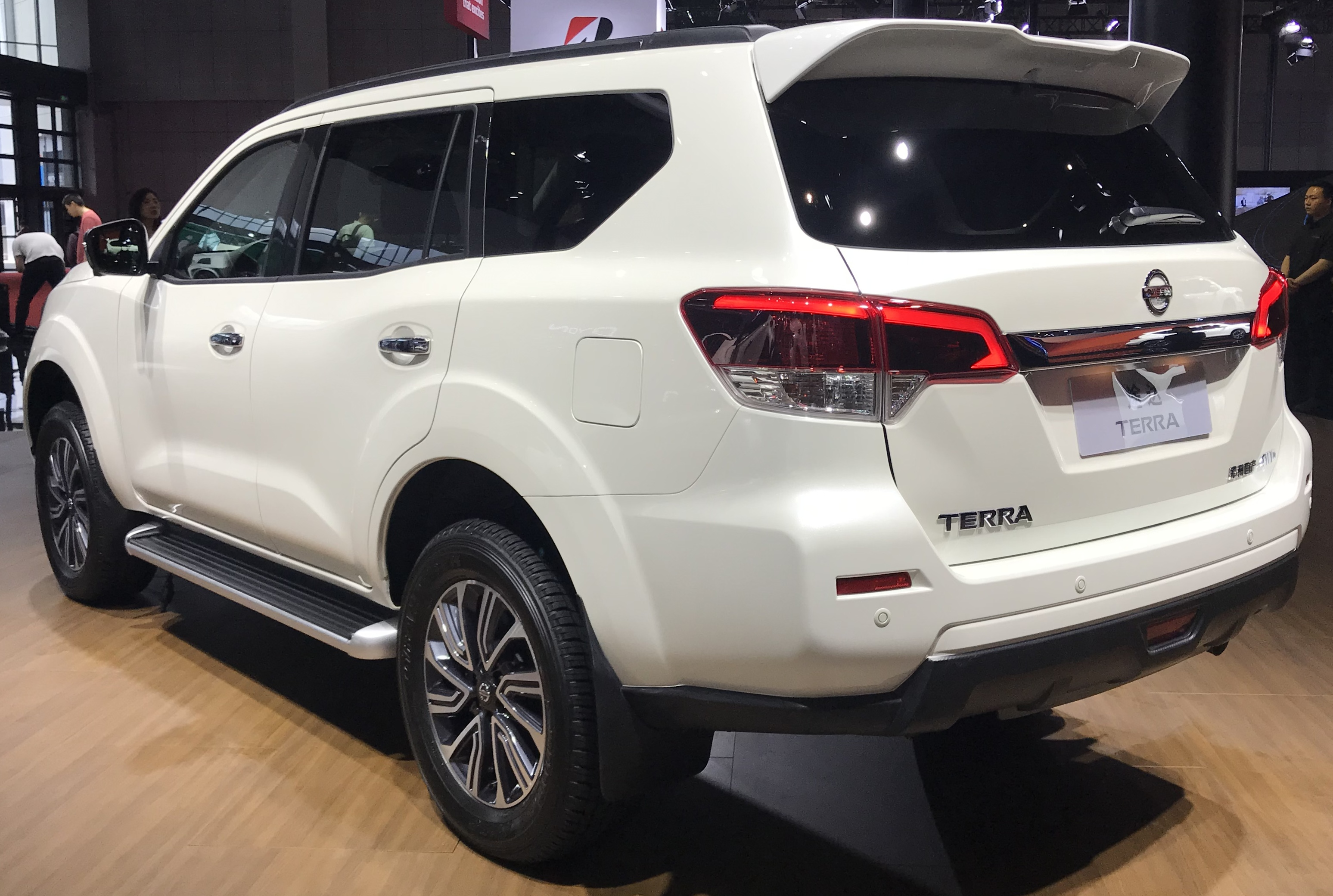
Terra (China)

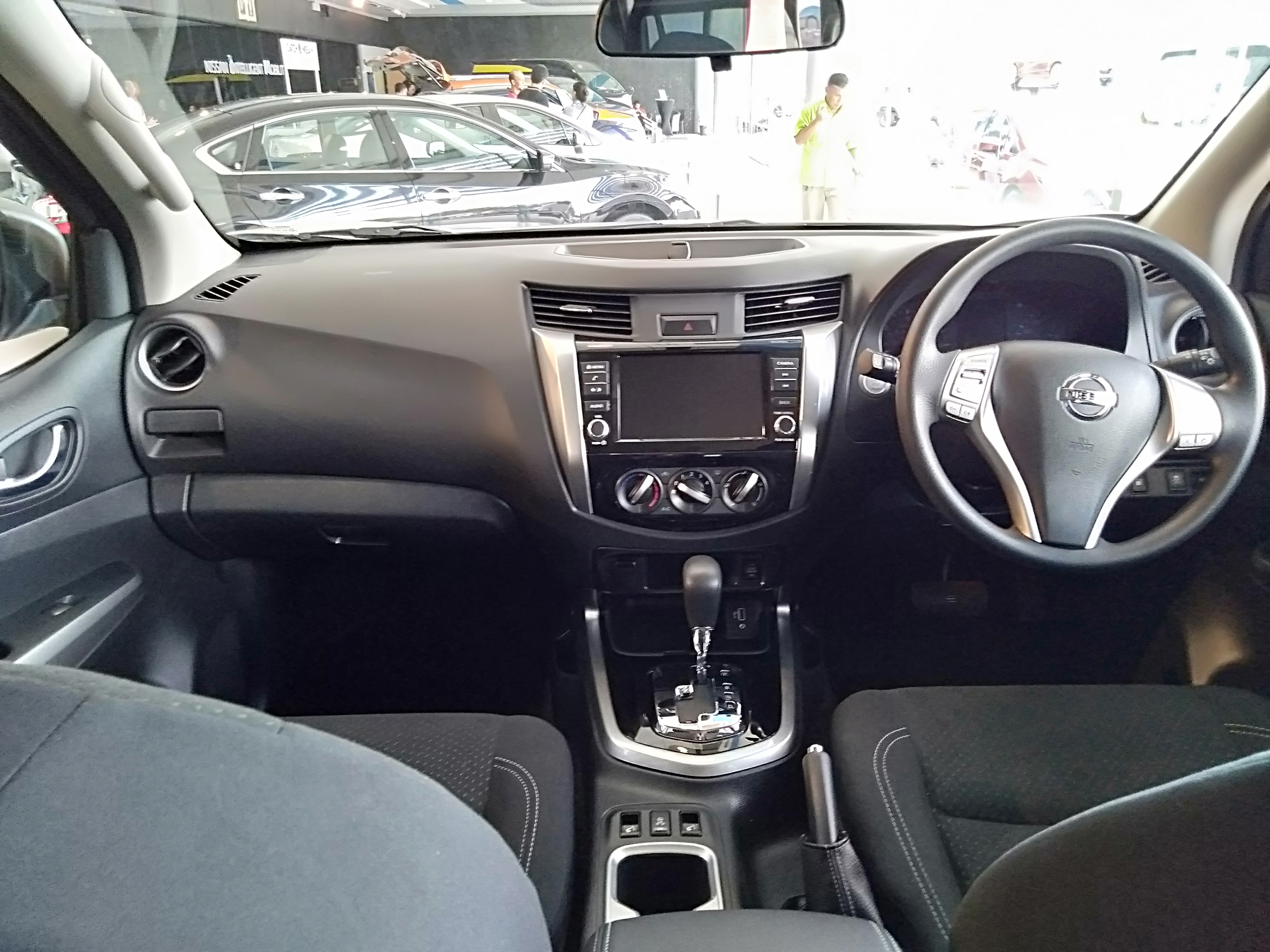
Interior

Facelift

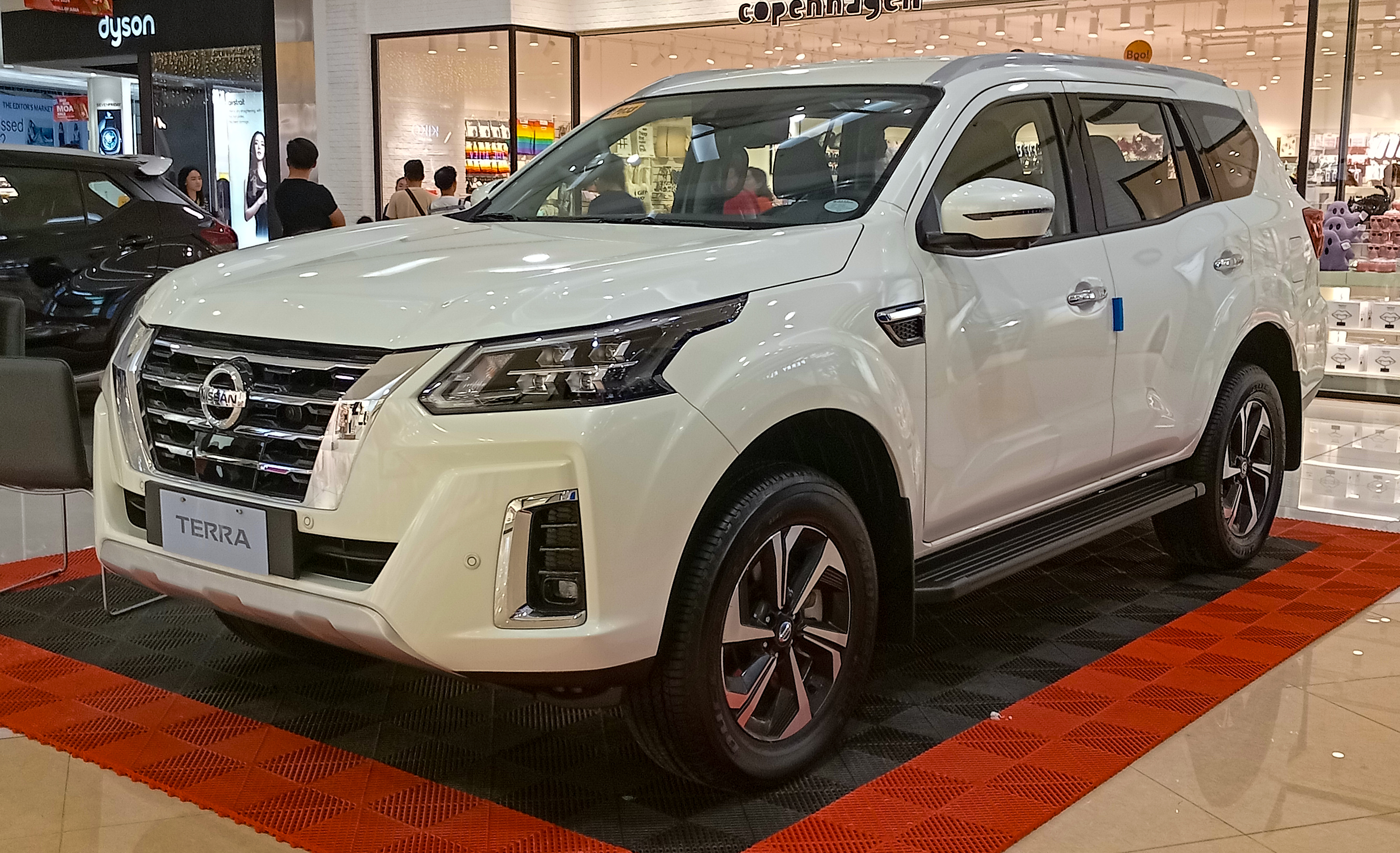
2024 Terra 2.5 VL (Philippines)

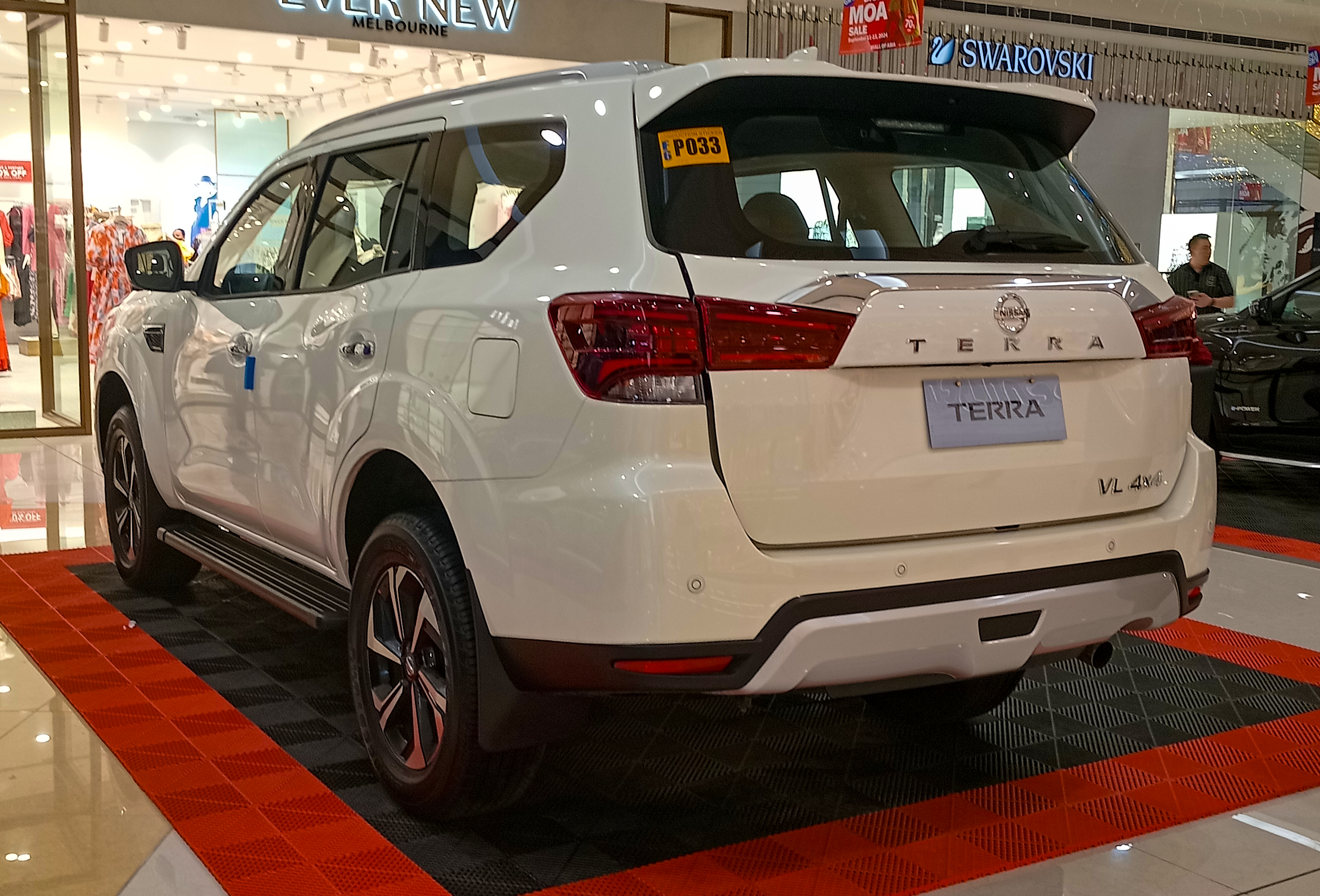
2024 Terra 2.5 VL (Philippines)

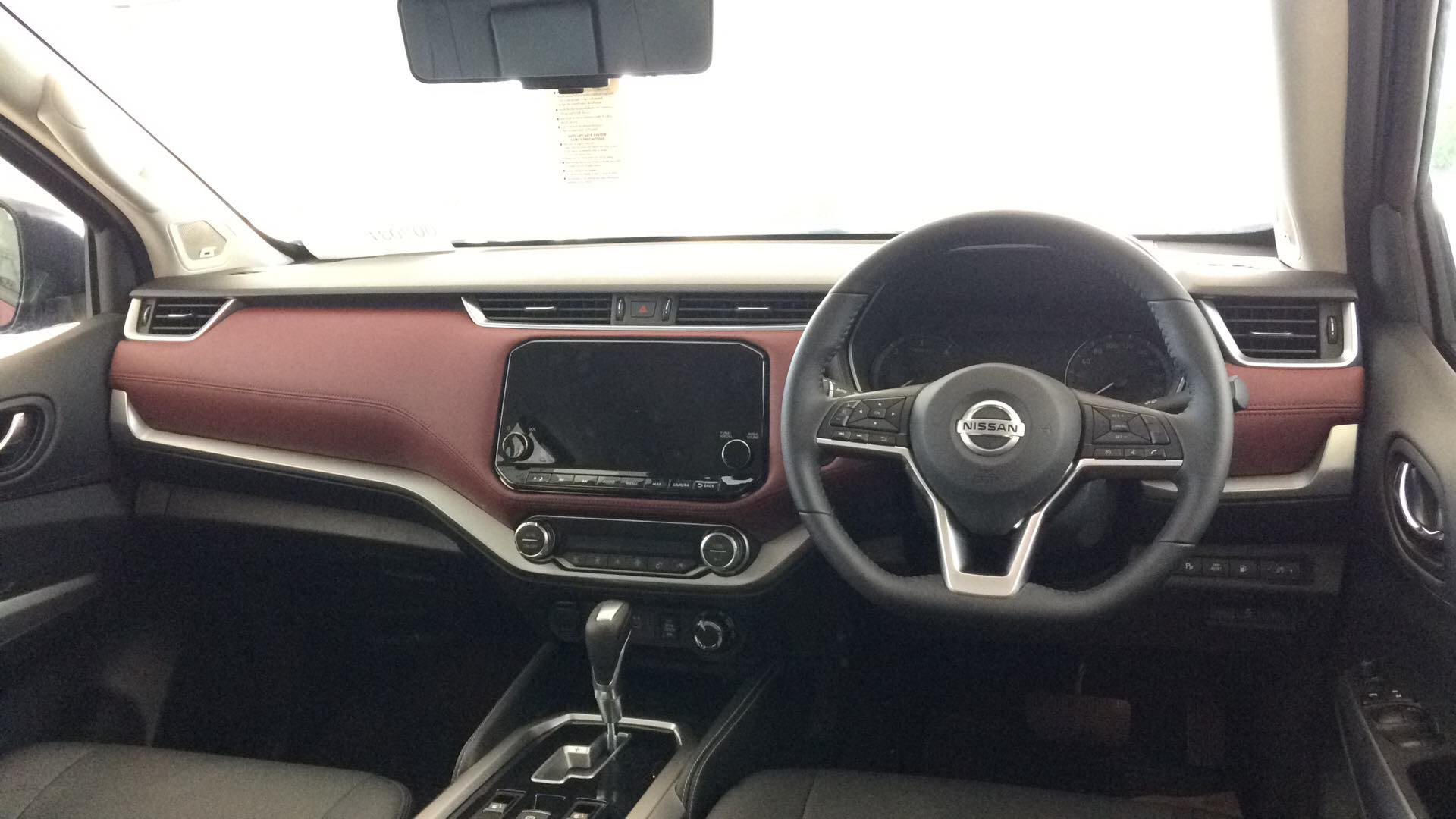
Interior

== Sales ==
Year	China	Thailand	Philippines	Indonesia
2018	12,518	1,128	4,151	791
2019	10,900	1,754	10,469	1,166
2020	14,110	1,338	3,898	800
2021	15,857	592	3,970	
2022	9,587	1,202		
2023		1,148		126
2024		486	5,779	86
2025		295		
Total		8,243		
