= St. Astvatsatsin Church (Darkand) =

Armenian church in Nakhchivan, Azerbaijan

- Սուրբ Աստվածածին եկեղեցի
- St. Astvatsatsin Church
- Location: Darkənd
- Country: Azerbaijan
- Denomination: Armenian Apostolic Church

History
- Status: Destroyed
- Founded: 17th century

Architecture
- Style: Basilica
- Demolished: 2004–2010

St. Astvatsatsin Church was an Armenian church located in Darkənd village (Ordubad district) of the Nakhchivan Autonomous Republic of Azerbaijan. The church was located in the center of the village.

== History ==
The church was built in the 17th century and was renovated in 1895.

== Architecture ==
The church was a three-naved basilica with a semicircular apse with vestries on either side. The entrance to the church was on the west, and there were inscriptions on the eastern facade. The building of the church had been turned into a village shop during the Soviet times.

== Destruction ==
The building of the church was still intact in 2004. However, by 2010, the church had been torn down and a new structure, with smaller dimensions, built in its place, according to investigation of the Caucasus Heritage Watch.
