= Ləkətağ =

Leketagh
- Municipality
- Azerbaijani: Ləkətağ
- Location within Azerbaijan
- Coordinates: 39°17′17″N 45°49′34″E
- Country: Azerbaijan
- Autonomous republic: Nakhchivan
- District: Julfa

Population (2005)
  - Total: 436
- Time zone: UTC+4 (AZT)

Ləkətağ (also, Leketagh and Lakatagh) is a village and municipality in the Julfa District of Nakhchivan, Azerbaijan. It is located 60 km in the north from the district center, on the bank of the Alinjachay River, on the slope of the Zangezur ridge. Its population is busy with farming and animal husbandry. There are secondary school, two libraries, communication branch, and a medical center in the village. It has a population of 436. At the entrance of the village were registered the necropolis of the beginning of the 1st millennium of BC, the Zarishdere settlement and necropolis of the Middle Ages in the south-west, and the Kolasu settlement and necropolis in the junction of the Kolanısu and Demirlisu Rivers, in the north-east.

== Historical and archaeological monuments ==
=== Leketagh Necropolis ===
Leketagh Necropolis - the archaeological monument of the first Iron Age at the entrance to the same named village of Julfa District, on the bank of the Alinjachay River. It is limited by the yard area in the north, by the canyon in the west. It is located on the low hill. The soil road passes from the north side. During the road construction (1975) the necropolis was destroyed, but the discovered materials were collected and kept. According to the observations, the graves have been in type of the stone box. There were discovered fragments of clay pot in the area, the similar to the material which have been found in the necropolis of the Boyahmedli. It is supposed that the monument belongs to the beginning of the 1st millennium of BC.

=== Zarishdere ===
Zarishdere (Zərişdərə) - the settlement of the Middle Ages in the south-west from the Leketagh village of Julfa District, on the right bank of the Alinjachay River. From the west side is surrounded by high mountains. Its area is 890 km2. The exploration research works have been carried out (1991). Because of its location at the mountain slope, the cultural layer has been washed out and destroyed. Unglazed fragments were collected. The Zarishdere, currently being used as arable land. According to information of the local population, at the time there were a mosque and residential buildings. When the area has been plowed, quern stone, copper plates, candlesticks, etc., things were found. In the north end of the settlement, there is a sanctuary surrounded in a circular form with the large stones and bushes. It is assumed that the place of residence belongs to the 16-18 centuries.

=== Zarishdere Necropolis ===
Zarishdere Necropolis - the archaeological monument of the Middle Ages in the Julfa District, in the west from the Zarishdere settlement, on a high hill. The exploration research works were carried out (1990–91). All of the graves are in the east-west direction, the gravestones are to the west side. It is supposed that the Zarishdere necropolis belongs to the 16-18 centuries.

=== Kolasu ===
Kolasu - the settlement of the early Middle Ages in the north-east from the Leketagh village of Julfa District, on the junction of the Kolanysu and Demirlisu Rivers. Its area is 2500 m2. It was registered and exploration research works was carried out in 1991. The monument is cover the three of terrace on top of each other. The surface is covered with the remains of the wrecked construction, the buildings are completely destroyed. Surface materials consist of broken grain stones, fragments of the cooked clay pot in the pink color, etc. It is assumed that the monument belongs to the 6-8 centuries.

=== Kolasu Necropolis ===
Kolasu Necropolis - the archaeological monument of the Middle Ages in the north-east from the Leketagh village of Julfa District, in the north of the same named settlement. It was registered and exploration research works was carried out in 1991. It stretch from west to east in a form of the narrow strips. The graves are directed towards the west and the east. According to the observations, the graves were the type of stone box. It is supposed that the necropolis belongs to the 6-8 centuries.
