= Darkənd =

Village and municipality in Nakhchivan, Azerbaijan

- Municipality
- Location within Azerbaijan
- Coordinates: 38°55′N 45°49′E
- Country: Azerbaijan
- Autonomous republic: Nakhchivan
- District: Ordubad

Population (2005)
  - Total: 500
- Time zone: UTC+4 (AZT)

Darkənd (also, Dər, Dar, and Der) is a village and municipality in the Ordubad District of Nakhchivan, Azerbaijan. It is located in the south of the Ordubad-Nakhchivan highway, 15 km in the south-west from the district center, on the right bank of the Gilanchay River. Its population is busy with gardening, vegetable-growing, animal husbandry. There are secondary school and a medical center in the village. It has a population of 500. The ruins of the historical and architectural monuments is in the territory of the village. The tomb, the mosque's minaret, etc. is attracting attention.

== Historical and archaeological monuments ==
=== Darkənd ===
Darkənd - the settlement of the Middle Ages in near the Azadkənd village of the Ordubad region. Was registered in 1968. The settlement, covering a wide area has been severely damaged. The burned building which has been found in here, specially remains of brick shows that in the time there were buildings. Surface materials consist from fragments of pink colored of simple and glazed pots. The cultural layer consist from the fragments of pottery, layers of clay mixed of bricks. Most of the findings consist from the samples of the glazed and unglazed pots (pot, bowl, tray, cover, etc.). There were the grave stone ram statues of the Middle Ages in cemetery of its territory. The monument belongs to the 16th–18th centuries.

=== Dar's Tomb ===
Dar's Tomb - the Azerbaijan architectural monument. It is in the Darkənd village of the Ordubad region. The tomb is distinguished by its composition and decorative elements. The Dar tomb built from the brick, the middle part is in the form of tower-like tombs, the upper part is completing with the dome. The dark purple colored tiles on the tomb and the simple ornaments of built from the ordinary baked bricks is the only decorative element. It is impossible to define the date of the tomb because there has not the inscription on it. But the structure of composition, the color of the ornaments of glazed tiles on it shows that the monument has been built more later from the Garabaghlar and Barda tombs. According to the studies, it is assumed that the Dar Tomb belongs to the end of the 14 century or the beginning of the 15th century.

=== Darkənd Bridge ===
Darkənd Bridge - the historical and architectural monument in the Darkənd village of Ordubad region, on the Gilanchay River. It built in fiver arches with the hewed stones. It connect the Julfa and Ordubad regions. The width is 3.5 м. The area where located the bridge was taken into account during its construction and therefore the distance between the arches were built in different sizes. At the 3 middle of arches has the wave-cutter. Darkənd Bridge belongs to the 18th century.

=== St. Astvatsatsin Church ===
St. Astvatsatsin Church was a 17th-century Armenian church located in the central part of the village and was destroyed between 2004 and 2010.
