= Qoruqlar =

- Municipality
- Location within Azerbaijan
- Coordinates: 38°57′55″N 45°56′36″E
- Country: Azerbaijan
- Autonomous republic: Nakhchivan
- District: Ordubad

Population (2005)
  - Total: 184
- Time zone: UTC+4 (AZT)

Qoruqlar (also, Goruglar, Korukhlar, and Koruklyar) is a village and municipality in the Ordubad District of Nakhchivan, Azerbaijan. It is located in the right side of the Ordubad-Unus highway, 27 km in the north-west from the district center, on the bank of the Venendchay river. Its population is busy with gardening, vegetable-growing and animal husbandry. There are secondary school, library and a medical center in the village. It has a population of 184.

== Etymology ==
According to researches, the name of the village is from the name of qoruq branch of zülqədər (zyulgadar) tribe of the Qızılbaşlar (Qizilbash). And these branch is from karyk tribe who were one of the 24 tribes of Selcuk-oghuzs.
