= Boyəhməd =

- Municipality
- Location within Azerbaijan
- Coordinates: 39°16′03″N 45°50′45″E
- Country: Azerbaijan
- Autonomous republic: Nakhchivan
- District: Julfa

Population (2005)
  - Total: 267
- Time zone: UTC+4 (AZT)

Boyəhməd (also, Bəyəhməd and Boyakhmed) is a village and municipality in the Julfa District of Nakhchivan, Azerbaijan. It is located 64 km in the north from the district center, on the left bank of the Alinjachay River, on the slope of the Zangezur ridge. There are secondary school, club, library and a medical center in the village. It has a population of 267.

== Etymology ==
The name of the village is related with the name of boyahmedli tribe of the Turkic gazakhlar. It is an Ethno-toponym.

== Historical and archaeological monuments ==
=== Boyahmedli I ===
Boyahmedli I – the settlement of the first Iron Age in the north-west of the Boyahmedli village of Julfa region, on the left bank of Daryachay River. Monument is located on the slope of the mountain ridge down to the river. Its area is 1500 m2. Was registered in 1991. As a result of the using as arable land from the area where the monument is located the surface materials and the cultural layer were destroyed. On the surface of the land have been found the fragments of the pottery, the grain-stones in pink and gray colored made from the tuff. Some of the pieces of potteries have been painted in black and been slightly polished. The findings are kept in the Museum of History and Ethnography of Julfa rayon. It is assumed that the monument belongs to the 1st half of the 1st millennium BC.

=== Boyahmedli II ===
Boyahmedli II – the medieval settlement in the south-west of the Boyahmedli village of Julfa region, on the right bank of Daryachay River. It is surrounded by the mountain range in the north and east, and in the north-west and south-west by deep valleys. Was registered in 1991. Its area is 1300 m2. The south-west side of the monument is covered with remains of the construction (buildings built with stone). In the place of some of the buildings are preserved the pits in the square-shaped. Here were found the broken parts of the millstone made from the white stone, in the middle is the hole with a diameter of 10 sm and products of clay in pink and gray colored. Muslim Cemetery is located in the northern part of the village. A bit in distance from cemetery, during road construction, the settlement has been cut, the cultural layer (thickness in 0,5-1,5 m) was destroyed. Layer has been in the dark color and consists from remains of the building, animal bones and fragments of the potteries (jug in the pink and gray colored, bowl, containers in lamp-type). In the Middle Ages, the settlement has expanded towards to the north-east and covered the territory of present-day village of Boyahmed. It is assumed that the monument belongs to the 3 - 9 centuries.

=== Boyahmedli III ===
Boyahmedli III – the medieval settlement in the north-east of the Boyahmedli village of Julfa region, on the slope of high hill. Necropolis is limited by the high mountains in the north-east, and in the south by the land road. Its area is 1600 m2. Was registered in 1991. Some of the graves are destroyed as a result of soil erosion, the head stones of the majority of the graves have fallen, and chest stones have rotted. The graves are in direction of the Qibla (sacred direction). Tombstones made in rough form, mainly, have been flat, is in the rectangular shape. On some of the chest stones of the graves was found the lines which is split in the endpoints. It is assumed that the necropolis belongs approximately to the 14-17 centuries.

=== Boyahmedli Necropolis I ===
Boyahmedli Necropolis I – the archeological monument in the south-west from the Boyahmedli village of Julfa region, on the both bank of the Daryachay River. Is surrounded by high mountains from all sides. Its area is 5000 m2. Was discovered during construction works (1989). Some of the archaeological materials were collected from the destroyed grave monuments. In 1991, the archaeological expedition did research of the two destroyed and two unharmed grave monument in the Boyahmed necropolis, have been collected some of the findings from the local population and handed over to the Museum of History and Ethnography of Julfa region. From the stone box graves, were found many ornaments, the bronze daggers, pitchfork, chain, spear tip and other materials. At the result of the exploration works, the graves did not have any surface signs. Starting from a depth of 1 m of the excavation area were found the remains of a human skeleton, near the western wall of the grave directed toward the northwest, top-down, face up the two skulls, beneath were found the bronze daggers, the third skull was upright at a distance of about 20 sm, the fourth skull was found nearby on the south wall, the beneath was found the bronze scabbard. From the around of the Skeletons were found the ornaments (bracelets, necklaces, rings, beads etc.), and from the grave were found the clay products in gray-colored (pitchers, plates, goblets, bowls, trays etc.). From the findings it is assumed that the Boyahmed Necropolis belongs to the beginning of the 1st millennium of BC.

=== Boyahmedli Necropolis II ===
Boyahmedli Necropolis II – the archeological monument of the first Iron Age in the north from the Boyahmedli village of Julfa region. It is located on the slope of the high mountain limited by deep valley in the north and south-east. Necropolis was studied in 1991. The graves do not have any surface signs. From the destroyed grave in the stone box-type during road construction were found two bronze bracelets, the bronze knife, and the samples of the clay pots. The analysis of archaeological materials shows that the monument belongs to the beginning of the 1st millennium of BC.
