= Düylün =

- Municipality
- Location within Azerbaijan
- Coordinates: 38°57′12″N 45°53′12″E
- Country: Azerbaijan
- Autonomous republic: Nakhchivan
- District: Ordubad

Population (2005)
  - Total: 787
- Time zone: UTC+4 (AZT)

Düylün (also, Dyuglyun and Dyuylyun) is a village and municipality in the Ordubad District of Nakhchivan, Azerbaijan. It is located in the near of the Ordubad-Nakhchivan highway, 17 km in the north-west from the district centre. Its population is busy with gardening, grain growing and farming. There are secondary school, library, culture house, mosque and pir (sanctuary) of the Middle Ages in the village. It has a population of 787.

== Düylün Piri ==
Düylün Piri - Sanctuary in the Düylün village of the Ordubad region. The Sanctuary located in the centre of the cemetery in the south of the village, consist from a small room. The grave, inside the room is the place of pilgrimage. There doesn't has an inscription on the building of Sanctuary. There remained the box-shaped graves and stone ram statues on the graves of the Middle Ages, and the dates on its epitaphs in the cemetery. It is not been clarified that the Sanctuary is founded in connection with the whom or which political events. Researchers are believed that the sanctuary is one of the centres of the Sufism and have existed since before the 14th century.
