= Göynük, Azerbaijan =

Göynük
- Municipality
- Location within Azerbaijan
- Coordinates: 39°17′28″N 45°39′35″E
- Country: Azerbaijan
- Autonomous republic: Nakhchivan
- District: Babek

Population (2005)
  - Total: 213
- Time zone: UTC+4 (AZT)

Göynük (also, Köynük, Gëynyuk, and Keynik) is a village and municipality in the Babek District of Nakhchivan, Azerbaijan. It is located 24 km in the north-west from the district center, on the mountainous area. Its population is busy with farming and animal husbandry. There are secondary school, club and a medical center in the village. It has a population of 213. Until 6 January 2015, it belonged to the neighbouring Julfa District.

== Historical and archaeological monuments ==
=== Göynük Necropolis ===
Göynük Necropolis - the archaeological monument of the Bronze Age near the same named village of the Babek rayon. Archaeological excavations wasn't carried out. According to the collected samples of the rich surface material culture, it is supposed that the monument belongs to the 3-2 millennium BC.

== See also ==
- Aşağı Göynük
