= Mingis Mosque =

Former mosque in Ordubad, Azerbaijan

- Azerbaijani: Mingis məscidi
- Location of the former mosque in Azerbaijan

Religion
- Affiliation: Shia Islam (former)
- Ecclesiastical or organizational status: Mosque (1677–1928)

Location
- Location: Mingis, Ordubad District
- Country: Azerbaijan
- Interactive map of Mingis Mosque
- Coordinates: 38°54′36″N 46°01′29″E

Architecture
- Type: Mosque architecture
- Style: Nakhchivan school
- Completed: 1677

The Mingis Mosque is a former Shia Islam mosque and historical architectural monument located in the Mingis neighborhood of the city of Ordubad in Azerbaijan.

Completed in 1677, the mosque was included in the list of local significant immovable historical and cultural monuments by Decision No. 132 of the Cabinet of Ministers of the Republic of Azerbaijan on August 2, 2001.

== History ==
The is situated in the Mingis neighborhood of the city of Ordubad. A marble plaque placed at the entrance gate to the Mingis Mosque states that the mosque was restored by Muhammad Hadi, the son of Abdulhussein Ordubadi, in 1088 AH (1677/1678 CE). Abdulhussein Ordubadi's father, mentioned in the plaque and the one who restored the mosque, was Abdul Hussein Ordubadi I, who served as the chief vizier of Shah Abbas and was the brother of Etimad ad-Dawlah Hatem Bey Ordubadi, Haji Adam Bey's son. Abdulhussein Ordubadi was the chief scribe, meaning the head secretary of the palace, during the reign of Safavid ruler Shah Safi (1629–1642).

The construction date of the mosque, restored in the second half of the 17th century, belongs to earlier periods. After the Soviet occupation in Azerbaijan, they officially began the struggle against religion from 1928. In December of that year, the Azerbaijan Central Executive Committee handed over many mosques, churches, and synagogues to the balance of clubs for educational purposes. If there were 3,000 mosques in Azerbaijan in 1917, this number was 1,700 in 1927 and 17 in 1933. Over time, the unused mosque fell into a semi-ruined state for years.

After Azerbaijan regained its independence, the mosque was restored in 2001 through the initiative of the city residents. By Decision No. 132 of the Cabinet of Ministers of the Republic of Azerbaijan on August 2, 2001, the mosque was included in the list of locally significant immovable historical and cultural monuments.

== Architecture ==
The plaque announcing the restoration of the mosque in 1677 was embedded in the wall during the restoration on the right side of the gate. The entrance is on the north side. The prayer hall is spacious and well-lit. The orderly ceiling of the monument is supported by columns placed in the center and above the side walls of the hall. As it is built on a slope, it is one-story from the north side and two-story from the south side. The main entrance of the mosque is on the north side. The monument, built in a simple style, does not use decorative elements in accordance with the architectural style of its period. Since there are other small mosques in the Mingis neighborhood, this mosque is considered the main mosque of the neighborhood. The first floor, which opens to the southern part of the mosque, is used for utility purposes.

== See also ==
- Shia Islam in Azerbaijan
- List of mosques in Azerbaijan
