= Aza, Azerbaijan =

Village and municipality in Nakhchivan, Azerbaijan

Aza
- Municipality
- Location within Azerbaijan
- Coordinates: 38°56′18″N 45°49′42″E
- Country: Azerbaijan
- Autonomous republic: Nakhchivan
- District: Ordubad

Population (2005)
  - Total: 442
- Time zone: UTC+4 (AZT)

Aza (until 2003, Yuxarı Aza, Jukhary Aza, Yukary-Aza, and Yukhary Aza «Upper Aza») is a village and municipality in the Ordubad District of Nakhchivan, Azerbaijan. It is located on the left side of the Ordubad-Nakhchivan highway, 17 km southeast of the district centre, on the right bank of the Gilanchay River. Its population is busy with gardening, vegetable-growing, farming and animal husbandry. There are secondary school, club and a medical center in the village. It has a population of 442.

== Etymology ==
The former name of the village, Yuxarı (Upper) Aza means "Aza village which [is] located in the upper side". In 2003, the name of the village was officially registered as Aza. In the various sources, this settlement is described as a small town in versions of Aza, Azar, Azat, Azad. Two villages of Aza and Azadkand are now located in the same location.

== Monuments ==
There was a ruinous Armenian church located on a hill to the west of the village. The ruins of the church were completely destroyed by April 26, 2004.

There was an Armenian cemetery located on the eastern edge of the village. The cemetery consisted of 240–250 tombstones. The cemetery was destroyed by April 26, 2004.

== See also ==
- Azadkend — formerly, Aşağı Aza
