= Aşağı Göynük =

- Municipality
- Location within Azerbaijan Location within Shaki-Zagatala Economic Region
- Coordinates: 41°17′09″N 47°00′40″E
- Country: Azerbaijan
- Rayon: Shaki

Population
  - Total: 2,599
- Time zone: UTC+4 (AZT)
  - Summer (DST): UTC+5 (AZT)

Aşağı Göynük (also, Aşağı Köynük, Ashaga-Geynyuk, Ashagy Gëynyuk, and Novo Gyuinuk) is a village and municipality in the Shaki Rayon of Azerbaijan. It has a population of 2,599.
