= Julfa =

Julfa, Jolfa or Culfa may refer to:

- Jolfa, Iran, a city in the East Azerbaijan Province of Iran
- Julfa, Azerbaijan (city), the capital of the Julfa Rayon
- Jolfa County, an administrative subdivision of East Azerbaijan Province of Iran
- Julfa District, a region in the Nakhchivan Autonomous Republic of Azerbaijan
- New Julfa, an Armenian quarter in Isfahan, Iran
- Armenian cemetery in Julfa, a destroyed Armenian cemetery in Julfa
