= Julfa District =

District of Nakhchivan Autonomous Republic in Azerbaijan

Coordinates: 38°57′36″N 45°37′48″E

- District
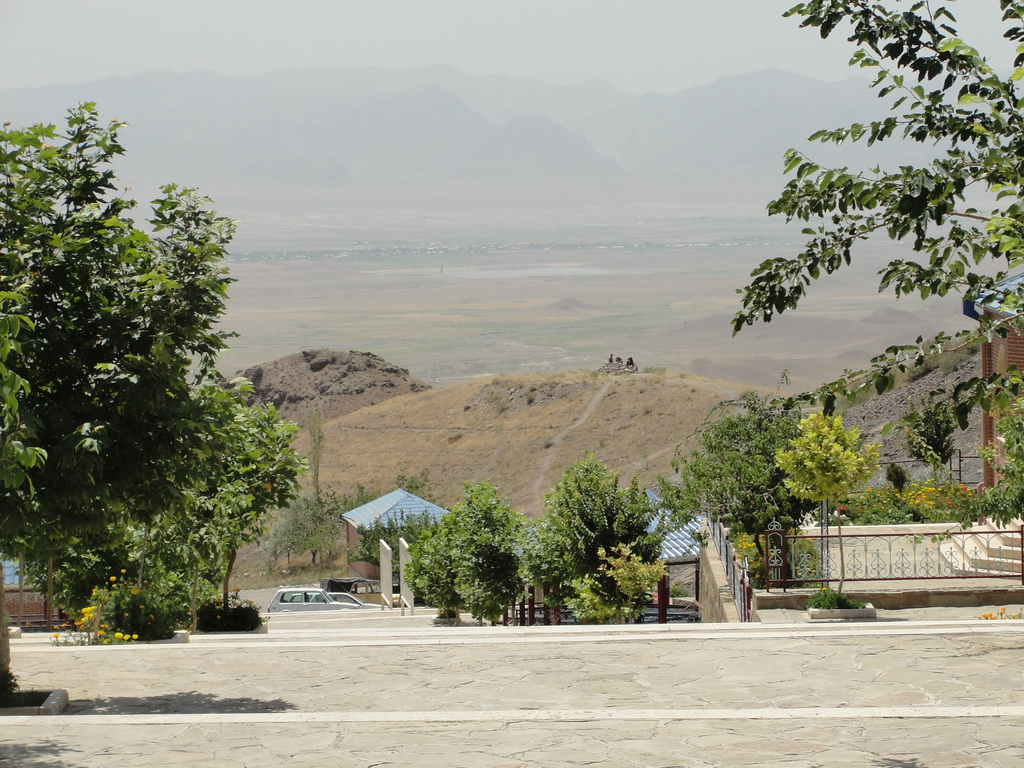

- Map of Azerbaijan showing Julfa District
- Country: Azerbaijan
- Autonomous Republic: Nakhchivan
- Established: 8 August 1930
- Capital: Julfa
- Settlements: 23

Area
  - Total: 1,000 km^{2} (390 sq mi)

Population (2020)
  - Total: 47,000
  - Density: 47/km^{2} (120/sq mi)
- Time zone: UTC+4 (AZT)
- Postal code: 7200
- Website: culfa-ih.nakhchivan.az

Julfa District (Azerbaijani: Culfa rayonu) is one of the 7 districts of the Nakhchivan Autonomous Republic of Azerbaijan. The district borders the districts of Ordubad, Babek, Shahbuz, as well as the Syunik Province of Armenia and the East Azerbaijan Province of Iran. Its capital and largest city is Julfa. As of 2020, the district had a population of 47,000.

== History ==
Established in 1930 and initially named Abragunus, it has been called Julfa District since 1950. The names, Jolfa/Julfa are also used for several regions in neighboring Iran.

On November 28, 2014, by the decree of the President of Azerbaijan Republic, the Nahajir and Goynuk villages of Julfa District were removed and added to the territory of Babek District.

== Geography ==
The district borders Armenia to the North-East, and Iran to the South. Julfa District is in the east from Nakhchivan city. Damirlidagh Mountain (3368 m) is the highest point of the district. Summer of the district is hot and dry, but winter is cold. Average temperature in January is between -10 and -3 °C, in July between +19 and +28 °C. Amount of annual precipitation is 200–600 mm. The Alinja, Garadara Rivers and the Aras River (along the border with Iran) flow through the district's territory. There are forest massifs in the mountains where trees such as oak, beech and hornbeam grow. Fauna is represented by such animals as wolf, fox and rabbit.

== Population ==
Compared to 1980, at the beginning of 2005 the district's population increased by about 13,177 people or 52.4%. On average density per square kilometer is 39 persons. Its large settlements are the Julfa city and the villages of the Yayji, Abragunus and Bananiyar. According to the State Statistics Committee, as of 2018, the population of city recorded 46,400 persons, which increased by 10,000 persons (about 27.4 percent) from 36,400 persons in 2000. Of the total population, 23,300 are men and 23,100 are women. More than 25,4 percent of the population (about 11,800 persons) consists of young people and teenagers aged 14–29.

The population of the district by the year (at the beginning of the year, thousand persons)
Region	2000	2001	2002	2003	2004	2005	2006	2007	2008	2009	2010	2011	2012	2013	2014	2015	2016	2017	2018
Julfa region	36,4	37,0	37,5	38,0	38,3	38,8	39,3	39,7	40,4	41,0	41,6	42,6	43,5	44,5	45,5	45,1	45,6	46,1	46,4
urban population	10,3	10,6	10,8	10,7	10,8	11,1	11,1	11,2	11,6	11,7	11,9	12,3	12,5	12,7	12,9	13,0	13,1	13,2	13,3
rural population	26,1	26,4	26,7	27,3	27,5	27,7	28,2	28,5	28,8	29,3	29,7	30,3	31,0	31,8	32,6	32,1	32,5	32,9	33,1

== Cultural heritage ==
On the banks of the Araz River are remains of structures belonging to the medieval Armenian settlement of Jugha, also known as Old Julfa. Its principal monument, a cemetery containing some 4000 grave markers, was completely destroyed in 2006. Believed to be still surviving are the ruins of a 13th-century caravanserai - one of the largest on the territory of Azerbaijan, and the ruins of a bridge dated to the beginning of the 14th century, built by decree of Nakchivan Khan Khakim Ziya Ad-Din. There is the small Gulustan Mausoleum (13th century) near the village of Gülüstan and more mausoleums near the village of Darkənd (particularly well preserved is the Tower Mausoleum (15th century). Further inland from the river there is the fortress of Alindzha (12th-13th centuries) and a number of other monuments and ancient ruins.
