= Ordubad District =

District of Nakhchivan Autonomous Republic in Azerbaijan

Coordinates: 38°54′N 46°02′E

- District
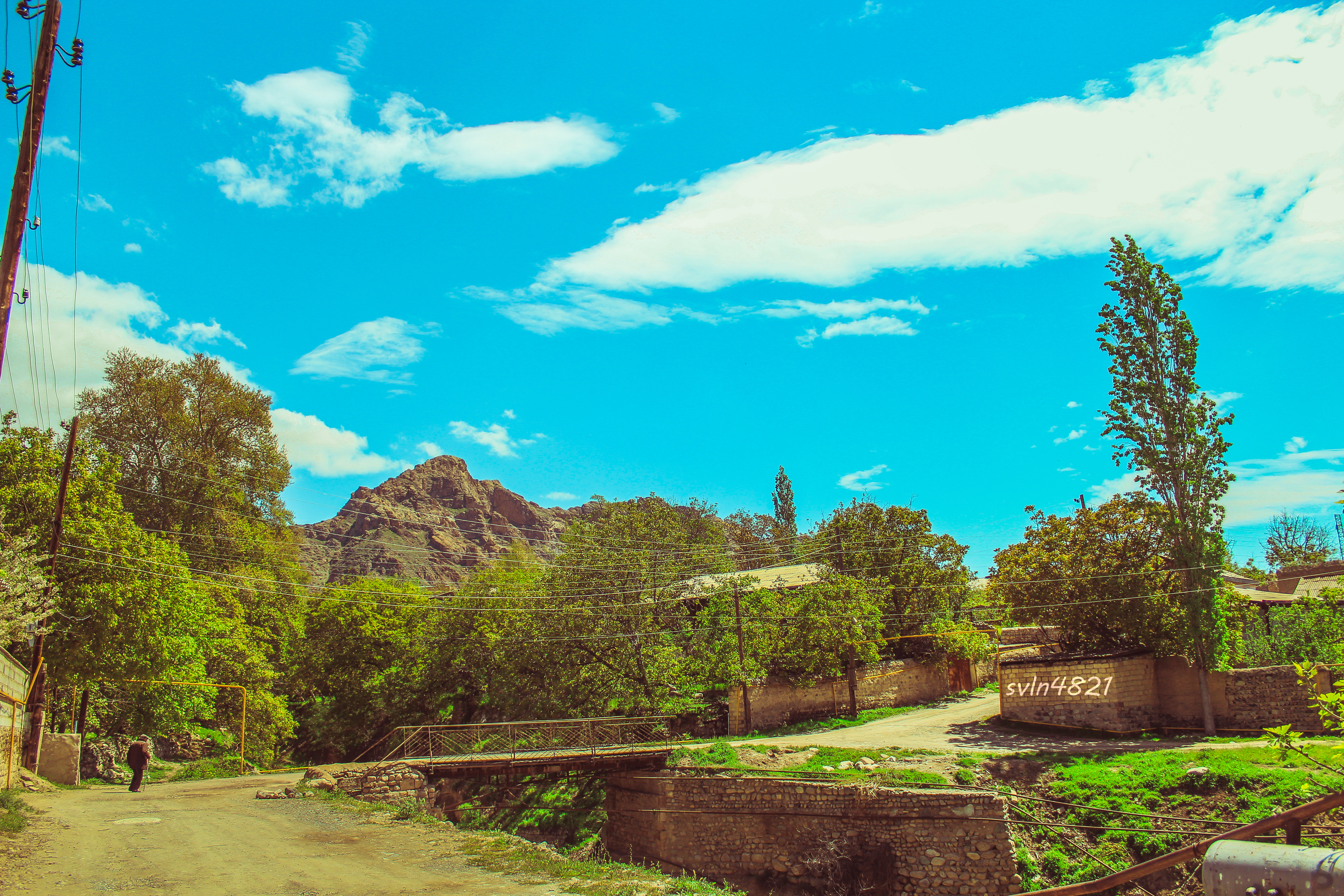

- Map of Azerbaijan showing Ordubad District
- Country: Azerbaijan
- Autonomous Republic: Nakhchivan
- Established: 8 August 1930
- Capital: Ordubad
- Settlements: 47

Area
  - Total: 980 km^{2} (380 sq mi)

Population (2020)
  - Total: 50,200
  - Density: 51/km^{2} (130/sq mi)
- Time zone: UTC+4 (AZT)
- Postal code: 6900
- Website: ordubad-ih.nakhchivan.az

Ordubad District (Azerbaijani: Ordubad rayonu) is one of the 7 districts of the Nakhchivan Autonomous Republic of Azerbaijan. The district borders the district of Julfa, as well as the Syunik Province of Armenia, and the East Azerbaijan Province of Iran. Its capital and largest city is Ordubad. As at 2020, the district had a population of 50,200.

== Etymology ==
Ordubad is a name of Turco-Persian origin and means, "city of army" (from Turkic ordu (army) and Persian bad (city)), which implies that the city was founded during the period of the Mongol, or the ensuing Il-Khanid rule.

== History ==
Ordubad region was a part of the khanates of Erivan and Nakhchivan, which were dependencies of Qajar Iran, with Ordubad forming the main town of the district of Aza-Jeran in the eastern part of the khanate of Nakhchivan. After the Russo-Persian War and the Turkmanchay Treaty of 1828, the region was ceded by Iran to Imperial Russia, becoming part of the newly formed Armenian Oblast. It subsequently became part of the Georgia-Imeretia Governorate, and then the Nakhchivan Uyezd of the Erivan Governorate. Since 1921 Ordubad was a part of the Soviet Nakhchivan Autonomous Soviet Socialist Republic, which in 1990 became the Nakhchivan Autonomous Republic within the Republic of Azerbaijan.

Ordubad district was established in 1930. In 1963, the district was abolished and given to the Julfa region. Since 1965, it has been an independent district.

== Population ==
According to the State Statistics Committee, as of 2018, the population of city recorded 49,700 persons, which increased by 8,500 persons (about 20.6 percent) from 41,200 persons in 2000. Of the total population, 24,700 are men and 25,000 are women. More than 25,9 percent of the population (about 12,900 persons) consists of young people and teenagers aged 14–29.

The population of the district by the year (at the beginning of the year, thousand persons)
Region	2000	2001	2002	2003	2004	2005	2006	2007	2008	2009	2010	2011	2012	2013	2014	2015	2016	2017	2018
Ordubad region	41,2	41,7	42,1	42,5	42,8	43,3	43,6	43,9	44,5	45,0	45,5	46,1	46,9	47,7	48,4	48,8	49,2	49,5	49,7
urban population	9,9	10,0	10,0	10,0	10,2	10,2	10,3	10,3	10,4	10,4	10,5	10,6	10,7	10,9	11,0	11,0	11,1	11,2	11,2
rural population	31,3	31,7	32,1	32,5	32,6	33,1	33,3	33,6	34,1	34,6	35,0	35,5	36,2	36,8	37,4	37,8	38,1	38,3	38,5

== See also ==
- Mingis Mosque

== See also ==
- Ordubad National Park
