= Tatar Cavalry Regiment =

- Active: July 27, 1914–1918
- Country: Russia
- Part of: Savage Division
- Engagements: World War I

Commanders
- Notable commanders: Peter Polovtsov (1914–1916); Fedor Bekovich-Cherkassky (1916–1917); Levan Magalov (1917–1918)

The Tatar Cavalry Regiment (Azerbaijani: Tatar süvari alayı; Russian: Татарский конный полк) was one of the regiments of the Caucasian Native Cavalry Division of the Imperial Russian Army, which was formed from Tatars (Azerbaijanis) of Elisavetpol and Baku Governorate, and also the Borchali uezd of Tiflis Governorate.

== Formation of regiment ==
The Caucasian Native Cavalry Division, better known as Savage Division, was formed from volunteer Muslims of the Caucasus and Transcaucasia, which, according to the Russian law of that time, were not subject to conscription for military service.

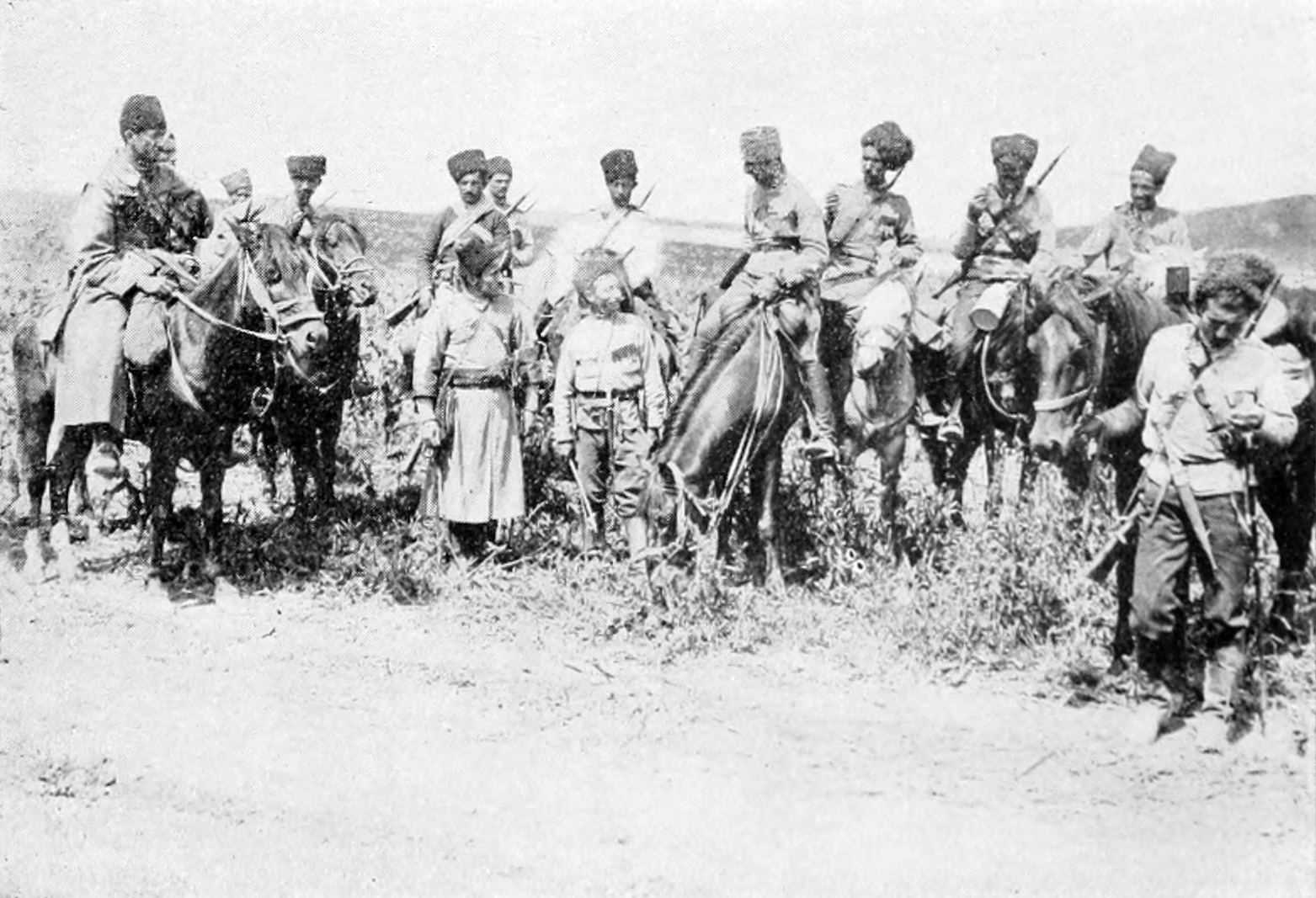
Сavalrymеn of Tatar regiment in reconnaissance. July 1917

On July 26, 1914, the Commander-in-Chief of the Caucasian Military District, General of the Cavalry, Adjutant-General, Count I.I. Vorontsov-Dashkov, through the Minister of War, addressed the Emperor with the proposal to use combative Caucasian people to form military units from them. On July 27, tsar Nicholas II gave his highest permission to form several regiments from natives of Caucasus for the duration of military operations, including Azerbaijani Cavalry Regiment.

According to the approved states, each cavalry regiment consisted of 22 officers, 3 military officials, 1 regimental mullah, 575 lower ranks (riders) and 68 non-combat lower ranks. The regiments of the division were combined into three brigades. The Azerbaijani cavalry regiment, together with the Chechen Regiment, was part of the 2nd brigade, commanded by Colonel Konstantin Khagondokov.

The Caucasian Native Cavalry Division was commanded by Grand Duke, Major-General Mikhail Alexandrovich Romanov, brother of tsar Nicholas II. The head of staff of the division was Colonel Yakov Davidovich Yuzefovich, the Lithuanian Tatar of the Mohammedan faith, who served in Headquarters of the Supreme Commander.

Lieutenant Colonel Peter Polovtsov was appointed a commander of the Tatar Cavalry Regiment. Assistants to the regiment commander were a native of Baku, lieutenant colonel Staroselsky and Rittmeister (captain) Shahverdi Khan Ziyadkhanov. To the Tatar regiment also was assigned lieutenant colonel of the 10th Novgorod H.M. King of Württemberg's dragoon regiment, Prince Feyzullah Mirza Qajar.

In early August 1914, was announced the beginning of the recording of volunteers. According to the records of the Elisabethpol Governorate by August 27 more than two thousand Muslim volunteers have registered in the Tatar regiment. Due to the fact that only 400 people were required, including one hundred from Azerbaijanis, residents of Borchali county of Tiflis Governorate, further recording was stopped.

During his stay in Tiflis in November 1914 Nicholas II appealed to the deputation of Muslims with the following words:

I express my heartfelt gratitude to all representatives of the Muslim population of the Tiflis and Elizavetpol (Ganja) gubernias, who took it so sincerely in the hard times undergoing it, as evidenced by the equipping of the Muslim cavalry of the six cavalry regiments in the division, which, under the command of my brother, went to fight our common enemy.

By early September, the formation of the Tatar Cavalry Regiment was completed. Soon the regiment marched to Armavir, designated as the assembly point of the units of the Caucasian Native Cavalry Division. At the end of September, the regiments were transferred to Ukraine, where they continued to prepare for combat work. The Tartar mounted regiment was stationed in the area of Zhmerynka.

== Participation in military operations ==
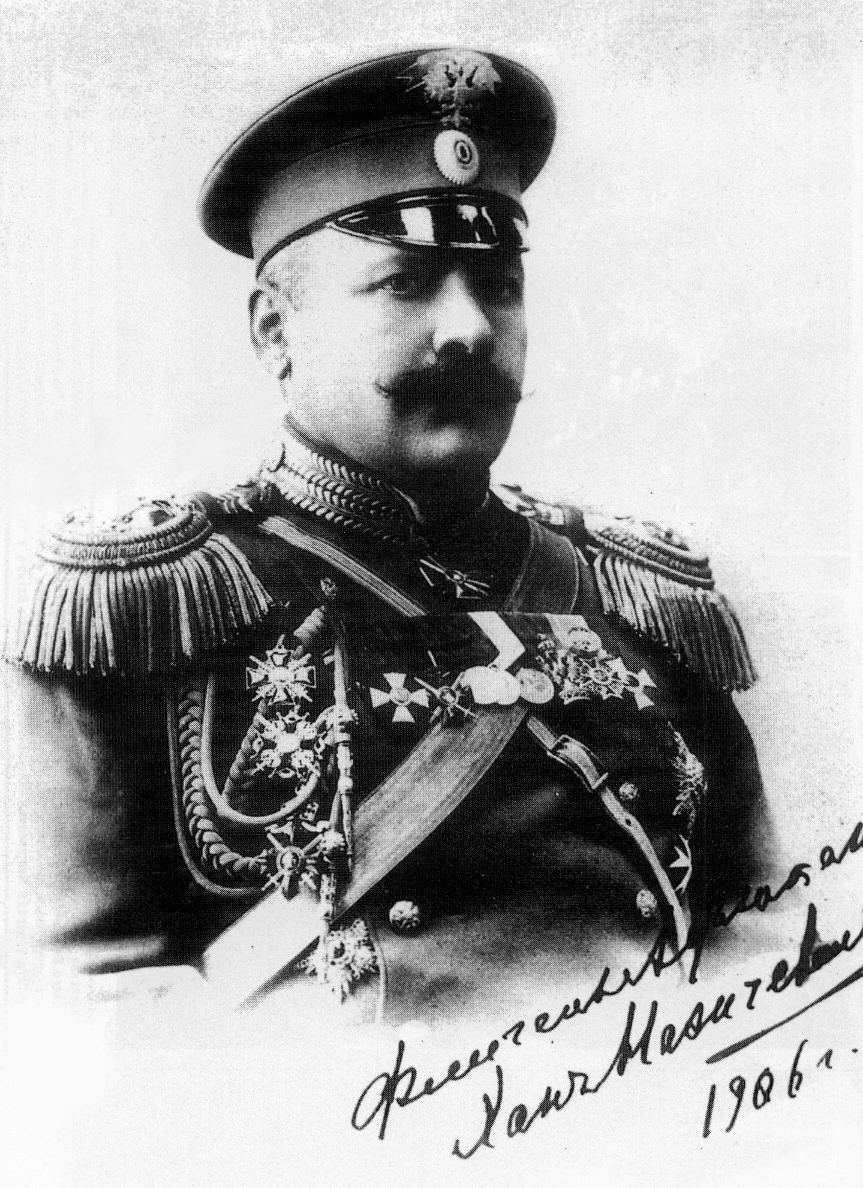
Huseyn Khan Nakhchivanski was a Russian Cavalry General of Azerbaijani origin. He was the only Muslim to serve as General-Adjutant of the H. I. M. Retinue.

In early November, the Savage Division was included in the 2nd Cavalry Corps of Lieutenant-General Huseyn Khan Nakhchivanski. The transfer of the division's personnel to Lviv began on November 15. On November 26, in Lviv, the commander of the corps Khan Nakhchivanski conducted a muster of the division.

Right from the muster, the regiments of the division were moved to the south-west of the city of Sambor, where they took up indicated combat site on the bank of the San River. A heavy fighting winter work began in the Carpathians. The division fought hard at Polianchik, Rybne, Verkhovyna-Bystra. Especially heavy and bloody battles were fought in December 1914 on San and in January 1915 in the region of Limna-Lutowiska, where the division beat off the enemy's attack on Przemyśl.

In February 1915, the division fulfilled a number of successful offensive operations. On February 15, the Tatar regiment fought a fierce battle near the village of Bryn. After a heavy battle, close to melee fights, the enemy was knocked out of this settlement. The commander of the regiment, Lieutenant-Colonel Polovtsov, was awarded the Order of St. George of the 4th degree.

From the telegram of the commander of the Azerbaijani regiment Colonel Polovtsov to governor of Elisabethpol Governorate G. Kovalev:

The Tatar (Azerbaijani) Regiment was the first of the Native division to earn its commander St. George cross. Being proud of the high award, I consider it an exceptionally flattering assessment of high military qualities and selfless courage of the Tatar riders. I ask you to accept the expression of my deepest admiration for the unprecedented valor of the Muslim soldiers of the Elizavetpol gubernia. Polovtsov.

Another person, who distinguished himself in this battle was Colonel Prince Feyzullah Mirza Qajar. He also was awarded the Order of St. George of the 4th degree. From the award presentation:

On February 15, 1915, after taking on his own initiative a team of four hundred men of Uman Cossack regiment, that had only one officer, Prince Fejzulla Mirza Kajar led them to a decisive advance under heavy gun and machine gun fire, twice returned the retreating Cossacks and, thanks to decisive actions, contributed to the capture of Bryn village.

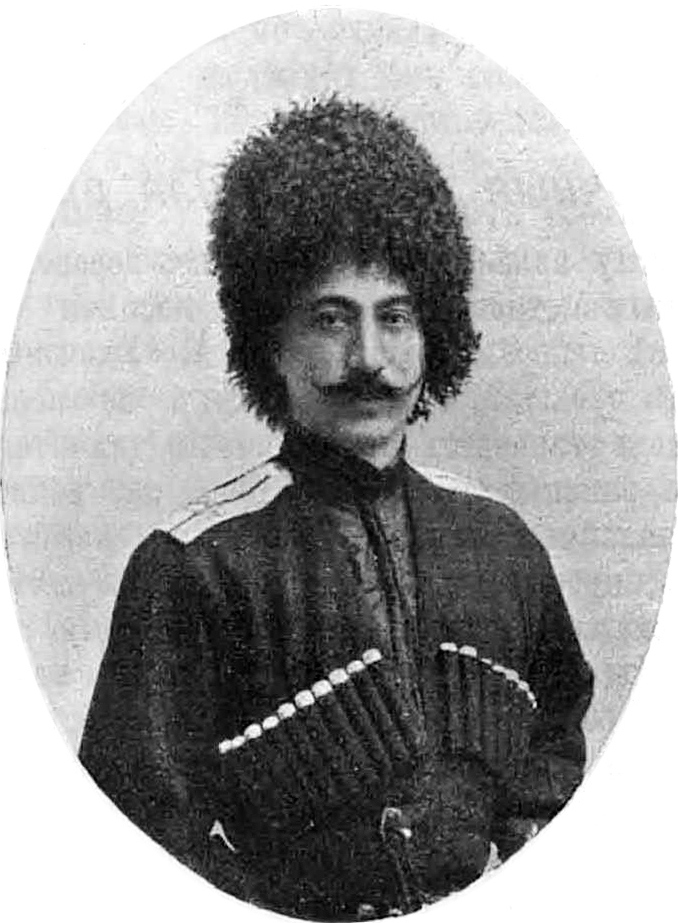
Feyzullah Mirza Qajar was a prince of Persia's Qajar dynasty and an Imperial Russian and Azerbaijani military commander, having the rank of Major-General. In the Russian imperial army, he was the commander of the 1st Caucasian Native Cavalry Division, and the commander of Ganja garrison in the army of Azerbaijan Democratic Republic.

On February 17, 1915, Colonel Prince Feyzulla Mirza Qajar was appointed commander of the Chechen Cavalry Regiment, succeeding the commander of the regiment Colonel A. Svyatopolk-Mirsky who died in battle the day before. In July–August 1915, the Savage Division fought hard on the left bank of the Dniester. Here Colonel Prince Feyzulla Mirza Qajar distinguished himself again. From the order of the commander of the Caucasian Native Cavalry Division:

Especially he showed great valor in the period of heavy fighting in the Vinyantyntsy area (August 12–15, 1915), when, commanding the 2nd brigade, which lost about 250 riders, fought off 5 violent attacks of the Austrians..

In the beginning of 1916 command structure of the division undergone great changes. Major-General Dmitry Bagration was appointed to the position of the commander of division. Colonel Polovtsov became the chief of staff of the division. Colonel of the Kabarda Cavalry Regiment, Duke Fyodor Nikolayevich Bekovich-Cherkassky was appointed the commander of the Tatar Horse Regiment.

On May 31, 1916, Colonel Bekovich-Cherkassky, having received an order to dislodge the enemy from the village of Tyshkovtsi, personally led three sotnias of the Tatar regiment to attack under a hurricane of fire from the Austrians. Cavalry attack of regiment led to successful capture of the territory. Until the middle of the day, the Austrians several times tried to retake Tyshkovtsi, but to no avail.

After a while, two hundred Chechens of Colonel Qajar, two guns of the horse-mountain division and a battalion of the infantry of the Trans Amur regiment came to the rescue of the Tatar regiment. During the day, they fought off 5 attacks of the enemy. In addition to the 177 prisoners, the Austrians lost 256 people killed. For this battle, the commander of the Tatar regiment, Colonel Prince Bekovich-Cherkassky, was put forward for the Order of St. George the Victorious of the 3rd degree. During the entire period of the war, Colonel duke Bekovich-Cherkassky was the only officer from the natives of the division, nominated to the Order of St. George 3rd degree. In the first decade of June, the Tatar Cavalry Regiment, as part of the 2nd Brigade of the division, fought in the west of Chernivtsi.

Overcoming the stubborn resistance of the enemy, by the middle of June brigade reached the Cheremosh River, on the opposite shore of which the Austrians were entrenched. On June 15, the Chechen and Tatar regiments, under the heavy fire of the enemy, crossed the river and immediately seized the village of Rostock, began to advance northwestward towards the Bukovina Carpathians in the direction of Vorokhta in the upper reaches of the Prut River.

On May 7, the commander of the Chechen Cavalry Regiment Colonel Prince Feyzulla Mirza Kajar was promoted to major general for the battle distinction, and on May 30 of the same year, he was appointed commander of the 2nd brigade.

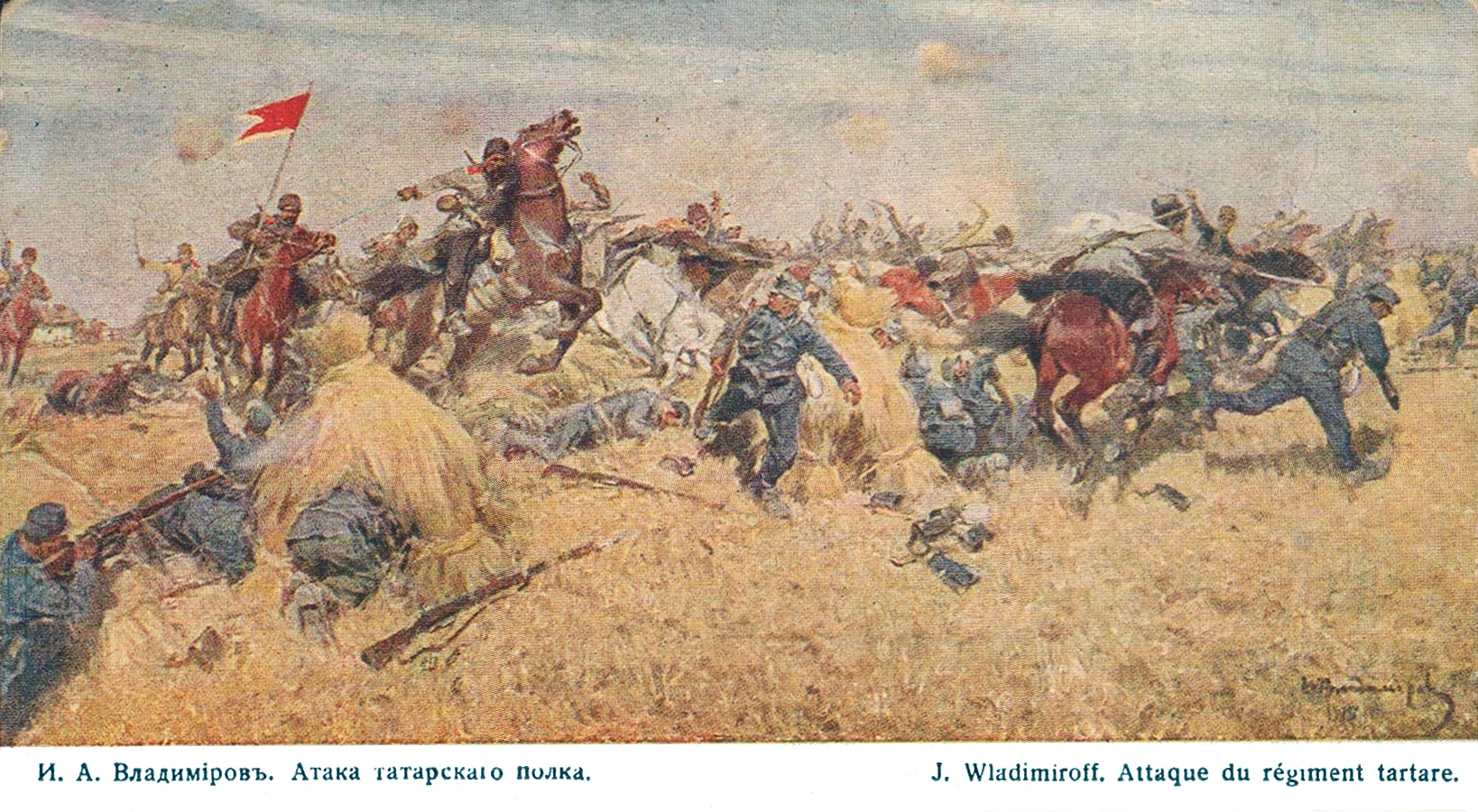
I.A. Vladimirov. Attack of the Tatar regiment

On May 14, the commander of Azerbaijani regiment colonel, duke Bekovich-Cherkassky was promoted to the position of the commander of 1st Guards Cuirassier Regiment. He was replaced as the commander of the Tatar Cavalry Regiment by colonel, duke Levan Luarsabovich Magalov.

On May 22, the chief of staff of the division Major-General P.A. Polovtsov was appointed commander-in-chief of the troops of the Petrograd Military District. From the telegram of P.A. Polovtsov to Mammad Khan Ziyadkhanov, who was one of the initiators of the formation of the Tatar Regiment:

Having received permission of the Minister of War to keep the uniform of the Tatar Cavalry Regiment, I ask you to convey to the Muslim population of Elizavetpol gubernia and Borchali county that I will proudly keep the memory of the valorous regiment at the head of which I had the honor of having a year and a half. Due to the endless series of feats in the fields of Galicia and Romania, Muslims have proven themselves worthy descendants of theirgreat ancestors.

Jamshid Nakhchivanski was a Russian Imperial, Azerbaijani and Soviet military commander. He rose to the rank of Combrig (equivalent to Brigadier General) in the Soviet Army.

During the summer offensive of the troops of the Southwestern Front, as part of the 2nd Brigade, the Tatar Cavalry Regiment operated to the west of the Stanislavov. For battle at Kalush the commander of the Azerbaijani Regiment Levan Magalov, lieutenant Jamshid Khan Nakhchivanski, cornets duke Khaitbey Shervashidze and count Nicholas Bobrinsky were awarded with St. George crosses of the 4th degree. In the hardest conditions of the summer of 1917, when the front was broken, the Russian army was demoralized, and parts of it ran erratically from positions, the Caucasian warriors stood to death.

From the article "Faithful Sons of Russia" published in "Morning of Russia":

The Caucasian native division, all the same long-suffering "savage", who pays with their lives for the trade and treachery of Russian armies "fraternization," its freedom and its culture. "Savages" rescued the Russian army in Romania; they overthrew the Austrians with an unrestrained blow and as a vanguard of Russian army passed the whole of Bukovina and took Chernovitsy. "Savages" broke into Galich and kicked the Austrians away a week ago. And yesterday, again, the "savages", rescuing the retreating meeting column, rushed forward and saved the situation, repulsing positions... They will pay own blood to Russia for all that land, for all the will that is demanded today by organized soldiers fleeing the front at the rear rallies.

Numerous combat awards were granted to the soldiers of the Tatar Cavalry Regiment. Some of them, for example Alibek Nabibekov, Sayad Zeynalov, Mehdi Ibragimov, Alekper Khadzhiev, Datso Daurov, Alexander Kaitukov, became full cavaliers of the Cross of St. George, i.e. they got all four degrees of the award. Osman Aga Gulmamedov was awarded with three Crossed of St. George and three George Medals. Zeynal Beck Sadikhov, who started the service as a non-commissioned officer in a team of scouts, earned three Georgievsky crosses and a George Medal, and after promotion to officer degree for battle honor he was awarded with four military orders.

During the war years, nearly sixty officers of different nationalities passed through the service in the Tatar (Azerbaijani) Regiment. Approximately half of them were Russian officers, as well as Azerbaijanis, Georgians, Kabardians, Ossetians, Abkhazians. There also were officers of Ukrainian, German, Tatar, Scottish, French and Polish descent. Among them lieutenant-colonels Alexander Albrecht and Nukh Bek Sofiev, rittmeister Sergey Bagretsov, staff rittmeisters Nikolai Kazbegi, Suleiman Bek Sultanov, Mikhail Horanov, lieutenant Selim Bek Sultanov, cornets Andrew Bers, Charles Testenoire, ensigns from volunteers Count Mikhail Muravyov-Amursky, Prince Idris Aga Qajar and others.

At the end of August 1917, it was decided to reform the Caucasian Native Cavalry Division into the Caucasian Native Cavalry Corps. For this, the Dagestan and Ossetian cavalry regiments were transferred to the division. After the formation, the corps was to be sent to the Caucasus at the disposal of the commander of the Caucasian army.

== Disbandment ==
In late September – early October 1917, units and subunits of the corps, including the Tatar regiment, were transferred to the Caucasus. The headquarters of the corps was in Vladikavkaz, and the headquarters of the First Caucasian Native Cavalry Division in Pyatigorsk. After the October Revolution in Petrograd, the corps retained its organization as a military unit for a short time. However, by January 1918, the Caucasian native cavalry corps had ceased to exist.

At the end of 1917, by the decision of the Special Transcaucasian Committee started the process of formation of the Muslim (Azerbaijani) corps under the command of Lieutenant-General Ali-Agha Shikhlinski. The corps was formed by the end of April – early May 1918. The Tatar (Azerbaijani) cavalry regiment was also incorporated into the corps. After the proclamation of the Azerbaijan Democratic Republic on May 28, 1918 and the establishment of a national army, the Tatar regiment was included into the Cavalry Division of the Azerbaijani armed forces.

=== Commanders ===
- 23.08.1914–25.02.1916 – Colonel Polovtsov, Pyotr Alexandrovich
- 25.02.1916–14.05.1917 – Colonel Prince Bekovich-Cherkassky, Fedor Nikolaevich
- 05.07.1917–хх.хх.1918 – Colonel Prince Magalov, Levan Luarsabovich

=== Famous people who served in the regiment ===
- Jamshid Nakhchivanski was a Russian Imperial, Azerbaijani and Soviet military commander. He rose to the rank of Combrig (equivalent to Brigadier General) in the Soviet Army.

== Bibliography ==
- Figes, Orlando (2014). A People's Tragedy: The Russian Revolution 1891–1924. London: The Bodley Head. ISBN 9781847922915.
