= Osman Agha Gulmammadov =

Military leader of Azerbaijan & the Russian Empire

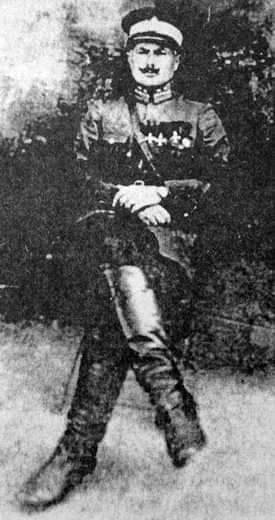
- Born: Yukhary Salahly, Kazakh uezd, Elizavetpol Governorate, Russian Empire
- Died: Kars, Turkey
- Spouse: Nazaket khanym
- Children: Khazar, Mahmud, Erdal, Turkan, Fatma Lala, Yuksel.
- Military career
- Rank: colonel
- Conflicts: World War I; Caucasus campaign; Battle of Kurdamir; Battle of Baku; Armenian–Azerbaijani war; Karabakh movement (1918); Battle of Askeran; Karabakh Uprising (1920); Turkish War of Independence

Osman Agha Gulmammad Agha oghlu Gulmammadov - (August 16, 1892, Yukhary Salahly, Kazakh uezd – November 1, 1950, Kars, Kars province) was an officer of the Russian Empire and the Azerbaijan Republic, as well as a colonel in the Turkish Armed Forces.

He participated in the First World War, the Battle of Baku, the Battle of Gokchay, the Karabakh uprising against the April occupation, and the Turkish War of Independence.

For his actions during the First World War he was awarded the second, third, and fourth class St. George's Crosses, as well as the second, third, and fourth class St. George's Medals. He was also awarded the Order of the Medjidie for the Battle of Baku and the Medal of Independence for the Turkish War of Independence.

== Life ==
Osman Agha Gulmammad oghlu was born on August 16, 1892, in the village of Yukhary Salahly in the Kazakh uezd of the Elisabethpol Governorate.

== Battlefield ==
=== In the Russian Empire ===
In September 1914, Osman Agha Gulmammad volunteered for military service and joined the Tatar Cavalry Regiment of the Caucasian Native Cavalry Division. He participated in military operations on the Austrian and Romanian fronts until August 1917 as part of this regiment. He began his military service as an ordinary soldier. In 1915, he was promoted to the rank of junior non-commissioned officer. In February 1915, he was wounded in the battles for the city of Brigen on the Austrian front. On March 22, 1916, he was promoted to the rank of senior non-commissioned officer, and on June 29, 1917, he was awarded the rank of militia ensign. He was awarded the second, third, and fourth class St. George's Crosses, as well as the second, third, and fourth class St. George's Medals for his heroism on the battlefield.

=== In Azerbaijan Democratic Republic ===
In the autumn of 1917, the regiments of the Caucasian Native Cavalry Division returned to the Caucasus. On December 11, 1917, the Muslim Corps, consisting of Azerbaijanis, was created by the decision of the Special Transcaucasian Committee. Led by Aliagha Shikhlinski, the Tatar Cavalry Regiment was also included in the composition of this corps. Osman Agha continued his service in this regiment. By the order dated May 16, 1918, No. 26, regarding military ranks in the Muslim Corps, Gulmammadov was awarded the rank of Poruchik with the privilege of a staff officer, and he was appointed as the commander of the third battalion. After the declaration of the Azerbaijan Democratic Republic in 1918, on June 26, the Muslim Corps was renamed the Azerbaijani Corps in Alat and became the basis of the National Army of the Azerbaijan Democratic Republic.

In 1918, Osman Agha Gulmammadov fought against the Bolsheviks in the battles of Kurdamir, Mususlu, and Sangachal. On August 17, an order was given to a battalion of the Tatar Cavalry Regiment to capture the hill located northwest of Balakhani village. Cornet Gulmammadov was sent for reconnaissance. After learning about the enemy's positions, he led a cavalry assault to create havoc behind them and facilitate the attack of the advancing battalion. The assault resulted in the capture of the hill, and it concluded with the defeat of the Armenian-Russian detachment stationed there. One enemy officer, 49 soldiers, and 3 machine guns were captured as booty. He also participated in the Battle of Baku. For his bravery in these battles, Osman Agha Gulmammadov was promoted to the rank of first lieutenant in the cavalry regiment and was awarded the Ottoman five-pointed "Mecidiye" Order by the order of General Nuri Pasha.

After Baku was liberated from occupation on September 15, 1918, the Karabakh movement began on September 23, 1918. The forces participating in the Karabakh movement included the 9th and 106th Turkish regiments, national volunteer units, and the 1st Azerbaijani Division. Osman Agha participated in these battles as the commander of the cavalry division within the Tatar Cavalry Regiment. In January 1919, during a review, the 1st Azerbaijani Cavalry Regiment, in which he served, earned personal commendation from the Minister of War. By the order of the Azerbaijani Republic government on May 16, 1919, Osman Agha Gulmammadov was promoted to the rank of Poruchik for his military merits. He was appointed as the commander of the third battalion. On June 26, 1919, he transferred from the 1st Javanshir Infantry Regiment to the 1st Tatar Cavalry Regiment. Due to the threat of Denikin's forces attacking Azerbaijan and to protect the northern borders, in July 1919, the 1st Tatar Cavalry Regiment, where Osman Agha served, was sent to Qusar for duty.

On March 21, 1920, the Armenian-Dashnak forces suddenly attacked the positions of the Javanshir infantry regiment located in Askeran, captured the Askeran crossing and started a rebellion. Later, the Azerbaijani army starts a large-scale attack in the direction of Askeran. As an officer of the national army, Osman Agha Gulmammadov also arrives in Ganja as part of the cavalry regiment on March 30. Later, he participated in these battles. Fierce battles that began in Askeran ended with the victory of the Azerbaijani army. The enemy forces were completely destroyed in the battles that lasted until the middle of April.

After the occupation of the Azerbaijan Republic, uprisings broke out in several regions of Azerbaijan against the occupation. The I Tatar Cavalry Regiment, along with the Javanshir Infantry Regiment and other military units, joined the Karabakh uprising under the command of Nuri Pasha. On the night of June 3–4, they entered Shusha and arrested members of the revolutionary committee and active communists. The uprising, which lasted until June 15, ended in defeat due to the arrival of additional enemy forces and bombardment by enemy aircraft. Afterward, Osman Agha participated in battles alongside the surviving soldiers of the Republic's cavalry and infantry regiments, retreated in the direction of Garayagin and Jabrayil, crossed the Araz River, and entered Iran.

=== In Turkiye ===
After the uprisings against the Soviet occupation were defeated, some of the remaining soldiers of the Azerbaijan Republic Army crossed into Nakhchivan via Zangezur, while others went to Iran via the direction of Khudafarin. When they approached the borders of Turkey, Nuh Bey Sofiyev, who was leading the Azerbaijani soldiers, handed over command to Samad bey Rafibeyli. Under Samad bey's leadership, they first arrived in Sharqi Beyazid, and then in June and July, they reached Hasankeyf and Erzurum. By the decision of the Grand National Assembly of Turkey, a 1,200-strong Azerbaijani unit consisting of one cavalry, one infantry regiment, and an artillery battery was accepted into the ranks of the Eastern Army (XV Corps) commanded by Kazim Karabekir Pasha. Osman Agha Gulmammadov was one of the 56 officers in the 1,200-strong Azerbaijani unit.

From the autumn of 1920 until the beginning of 1921, he participated in the Eastern Movement, which culminated in the cleansing of Armenians from Eastern Anatolia. In 1923, for his services during the Turkish War of Independence, he was awarded the "Independence" medal. After the War of Liberation, he remained in the military and rose to the rank of colonel.

On June 21, 1934, after the adoption of the Surname Law in Turkey, Osman Agha Gulmammadov took the surname "Kazah" for himself.

After retiring, he lived in the Yusuf Pasha neighborhood of Kars. He was elected as a member of the Kars Provincial Council. He died on November 1, 1950, and was buried with ceremony in the martyrs' cemetery in Kars.

== Family ==
Osman Kazah, a colonel in the Turkish Armed Forces and a participant in the uprisings in Tartar and Karabakh, is the uncle of Mammad Kazah, an officer of the Azerbaijan Democratic Republic.

He is a graduate of the Quran Seminary and the brother of Ahmad Agha Gulmammadov, a teacher at the Qazakh Teachers' Seminary and a victim of repression.

In 1931, while serving in the military in Kars, Osman Kazah married Nazaket khanym, originally from Gumru. They had three sons named Khazar, Mahmud, Erdal, and three daughters named Turkhan, Fatma Lale, and Yuksel from this marriage.

== Awards ==
During the First World War from 1914 to 1917, for his acts of valor on the front lines, Osman Kazak was awarded the IV, III, and II class "Order of St. George" medals, as well as the IV, III, and II class "Order of St. George" crosses.

In 1918, for his bravery during the Battle of Baku, he was honored with the "Medjidie" Order.

In 1923, for his services during the Turkish War of Independence, he was awarded the "Independence" Medal.
