= Irza-bey Hajibeylinsky =

- Azerbaijani: İrza bəy Hacıbəylinski
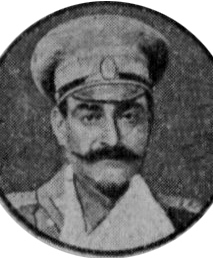
- Captain I. Hajibeylinsky. Photo taken after an injury (1914)
- Born: April 4, 1874; Erivan, Erivan Governorate
- Education: Elisavetgrad Cavalry School
- Spouse: Princess Alia-Soltan-khanum Qajar
- Children: Hajibeylinsky Kamil Irza-bey oglu
- Military career
- Allegiance: Russian Empire; Azerbaijan Democratic Republic
- Service years: 1896–1920
- Rank: Colonel
- Unit: Tatar Cavalry Regiment
- Commands: Tatar Cavalry Regiment
- Conflicts: World War I
- Awards: Order of Saint Stanislaus; Order of Saint Anna

Irza-bey Hajibeylinsky (born 4 April 1874) is an Azerbaijani military leader, colonel, who descended from “the nobility of the city of Erivan”.

== The beginning of the military career ==
Hajibeylinsky received his general education at the Erivan gymnasium. He entered the service as an ordinary cadet in the Elisavetgrad Cavalry Cadet School. After graduating it on 27 April 1898, he was promoted to cornet with an appointment to the 21st Dragoon of His Imperial Highness Grand Duke Mikhail Mikhailovich regiment. On 15 March 1902, he was promoted to lieutenant, and since 1 September 1905, to the staff captain. On 1 January 1909, in the same rank and in the same regiment, he had graduated from the Officer Cavalry School successfully. On 25 April 1912, he was promoted to rittmeister.

== World War I ==
He participated in the First World War. On 23 October 1914, he was wounded. For military distinction, he was awarded the Order of the St. Anne of the 4th degree with the inscription "For Bravery", with swords to the existing Order of the St. Anne of the 3rd degree. Twice, on 12 March and on the 31 August 1915, he got wounded. For military distinctions in 1915, the captain of the 7th Belarusian hussar regiment Hajibeylinsky was awarded the order of the St.Anna of the 2nd degree with swords, and the order of the St. Stanislav of the 2nd degree with swords. On 20 July 1916, he was promoted to lieutenant colonel. On 31 August 1916, Irza-bey Hajibeylinsky was appointed the headquarters’ officer for assignments under the head of the stage-transport unit of the Caucasian army.

== Service in the Armed Forces of the ADR ==
Since 26 July 1918, the Lieutenant Colonel Irza-bey Hajibeylinsky served in the newly formed Muslim Separate Azerbaijani Corps of the ADR, by the order of the Transcaucasian Commissariat. He was promoted to colonel. He also commanded the 1st Cavalry Karayaz regiment. At the beginning of July 1918, the corps was disbanded and its units, together with the 5th Caucasian and the 15th Chanakhgalin Turkish divisions that arrived, became part of the newly formed Caucasian Islamic Army of Nuri Pasha. The Colonel Hajibeylinsky continued to command the 1st Cavalry Karayaz regiment until the fall of 1918. Since November, as the commander of the 1st Cavalry Tatar Regiment. On 17 September 1919, he was appointed chief of staff of the Baku fortified region.

By the order of the Minister of War, the General of Artillery Samad bey Mehmandarov, No. 128 dated with 2 March 1920, the chief of staff of Baku fortified region, the Colonel Hajibeylinsky was appointed, on 1 March 1920, Head of the Operational Intelligence Department of the Quartermaster General's Office of Army Headquarters. On 3 April 1920, the Colonel Hajibeylinsky was included in the interdepartmental commission for the reception of property of the interned units of the Volunteer Army, as the head of the military department.

== Family ==
Irza-bey Hajibeylinsky was married to the granddaughter of the famous Azerbaijani writer and illuminator - Mirza Fatali Akhundov, the Princess Alia-Soltan-khanum Qajar. Alia-Soltan-khanum is the daughter of the Prince Bahman, Mirza's son, colonel, Prince Khanbaba-khan Qajar (1848–1926) and of Nisa-khanum Akhundova (1856–1924). Irza-bey Hajibeylinsky and Alia-Soltan-khanum Qajar (1889–1943) had a son - Hajibeylinsky Kamil Irza-bey oglu (16 January 1919, Tiflis — 16 January 1973, Baku).

== See also ==
- Aliagha Shikhlinski
- Amir Kazim Mirza Qajar
- Samad bey Mehmandarov
