= Caucasian Native Cavalry Division =

Caucasian Native Cavalry Division (Wild Division)
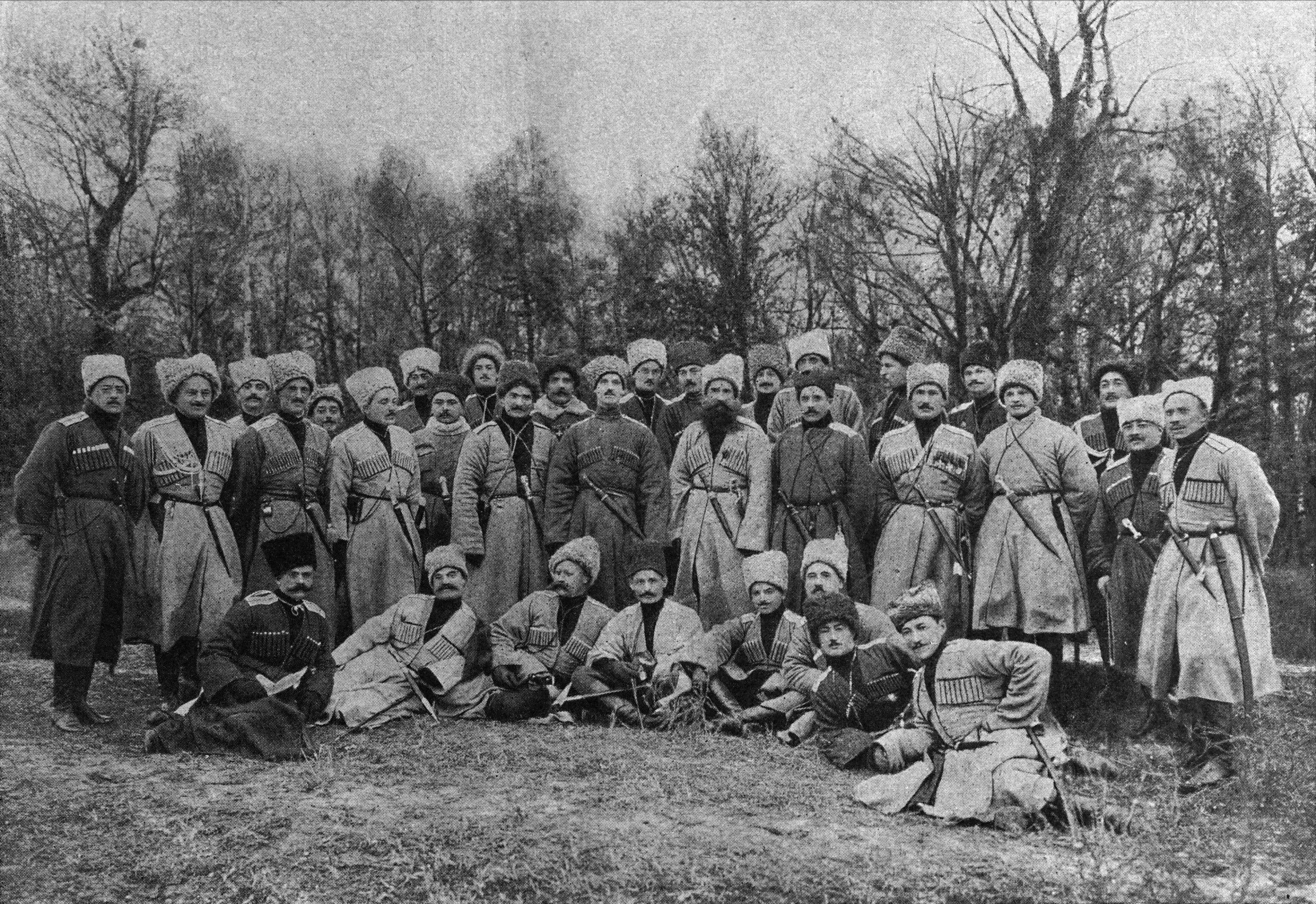
- Grand Duke Michael Alexandrovich and the officers of the 2nd Brigade, 1917
- Active: 23 August 1914 – 1917
- Country: Russian Empire; Russian Republic
- Branch: Imperial Russian Army (Russian Republic) Russian Army
- Type: Cavalry
- Nickname: "Wild Division"
- Engagements: World War I: Brusilov Offensive; Romanian Campaign (1916); Kerensky Offensive

Commanders
- Notable commanders: Michael Alexandrovich

The Caucasian Native Cavalry Division (Russian: Кавказская туземная конная дивизия), or "Savage Division" (Russian: Дикая дивизия) was a cavalry division of the Imperial Russian Army. Formed on 23 August 1914, it was transformed into the Caucasian Native Cavalry Corps on 4 September 1917 before being dissolved several months later. It was composed mostly of Muslim volunteers from among various peoples of the Caucasus. It took part in World War I, commanded by Grand Duke Michael Alexandrovich of Russia, younger brother of Emperor Nicholas II.

The division earned the nickname "Savage" for its personnel's traditional attire and relaxed discipline. During the course of World War I it distinguished itself in numerous engagements, including the Brusilov and Kerensky Offensives. During the February Revolution, initially the division supported Kornilov's coup under the assumption that the Bolsheviks were on the cusp of overthrowing the Russian Provisional Government, but after delegates from Petrograd informed them it was Kornilov who intended to overthrow the Government they refused to participate in the Kornilov affair. Dissolving soon afterwards, many of its veterans enlisted into the armed forces of the White movement and the Mountainous Republic of the Northern Caucasus.

== Formation ==
On 1 August 1914, the German Empire declared war against the Russian Empire, marking its entry into World War I on the side of the Triple Entente. Russia had already launched mobilization a day earlier. Already on 24 July, a group of Kabardin village elders petitioned the Russian emperor, asking permission to form a Kabardin Cavalry Regiment. The Kabardin Regiment’s formation was finalized on 6 August. Starting from 9 August, other Caucasian ethnic groups began forming their own volunteer cavalry regiments. On 9 August, Adjutant general Illarion Vorontsov-Dashkov presented the Russian High Command with a plan of forming a Caucasian Native Cavalry Division, consisting of five cavalry regiments and an infantry druzhina. On 20 August, following a petition of Ingush village elders; the Russian high command approved the formation of an Ingush Regiment. On 23 August, Emperor Nicholas II ordered the formation of the Caucasian Native Cavalry Division, simultaneously appointing his younger brother Grand Duke Michael Alexandrovich of Russia as its commander. The division consisted of three brigades, broken into six regiments, each of which numbered four sotnias. The 1st Brigade incorporated the 2nd Dagestan and Kabardin Regiments. The 2nd Brigade included the Chechen and Tatar Cavalry Regiments, while the 3rd Brigade consisted of the Circassian and Ingush Regiments. Ninety percent of the personnel were Muslim volunteers from the Caucasus, the rest belonged to various nationalities from across the empire; totaling over 60 different nationalities. Each regiment numbered 22–24 officers, 480–500 riders and 121–141 support personnel.

Michael Alexandrovich's appointment gave the unit an elite status and many foreigners in Russian service as well as Russian and Caucasian noblemen sought join it. Although Russian Muslims were exempted from conscription, many Caucasian ethnicities had a long martial tradition, pursuing a military career or volunteering for service during wartime. Police authorities declared an amnesty for all abreks and other native criminals, on condition of enlistment; many seized the opportunity. The division became commonly known as the Savage Division, because of the traditional attire of its personnel and its relaxed discipline, which was supplemented by the application of the "law of the mountains" honor code. Privates (riders) were allowed to address officers using the familiar version of the Russian word you (ты) as most languages in the Caucasus lacked a T–V distinction. Many recruits spoke rudimentary Russian, some only understanding basic orders, necessitating the use of translators. Recruits underwent up to 8–9 days of basic training. Unlike other divisions each regiment had its own mullah. The division’s men wore gray cherkeskas, black beshmets and gray or brown papakhas, chuviaks or boots. The color of the shoulder marks varied between each regiment, being red in the Second Dagestan and Circassian Regiments and blue in the Kabardin Regiment. Each recruit brought in his own weaponry, horse, saddles and uniform; while being issued firearms and lances. The division was issued Mosin–Nagant and Berdan rifles, which were supplemented by Belgian cavalry carbines during the course of the war. Each soldier gave a military oath adjusted to his religion. Each rider received 25 rubles per month and an enlistment bonus of 150 rubles. Starting from December 1914 each recruit's family was exempted from taxation and received a monthly allowance of 3 rubles and 40 kopeks.

== Service ==
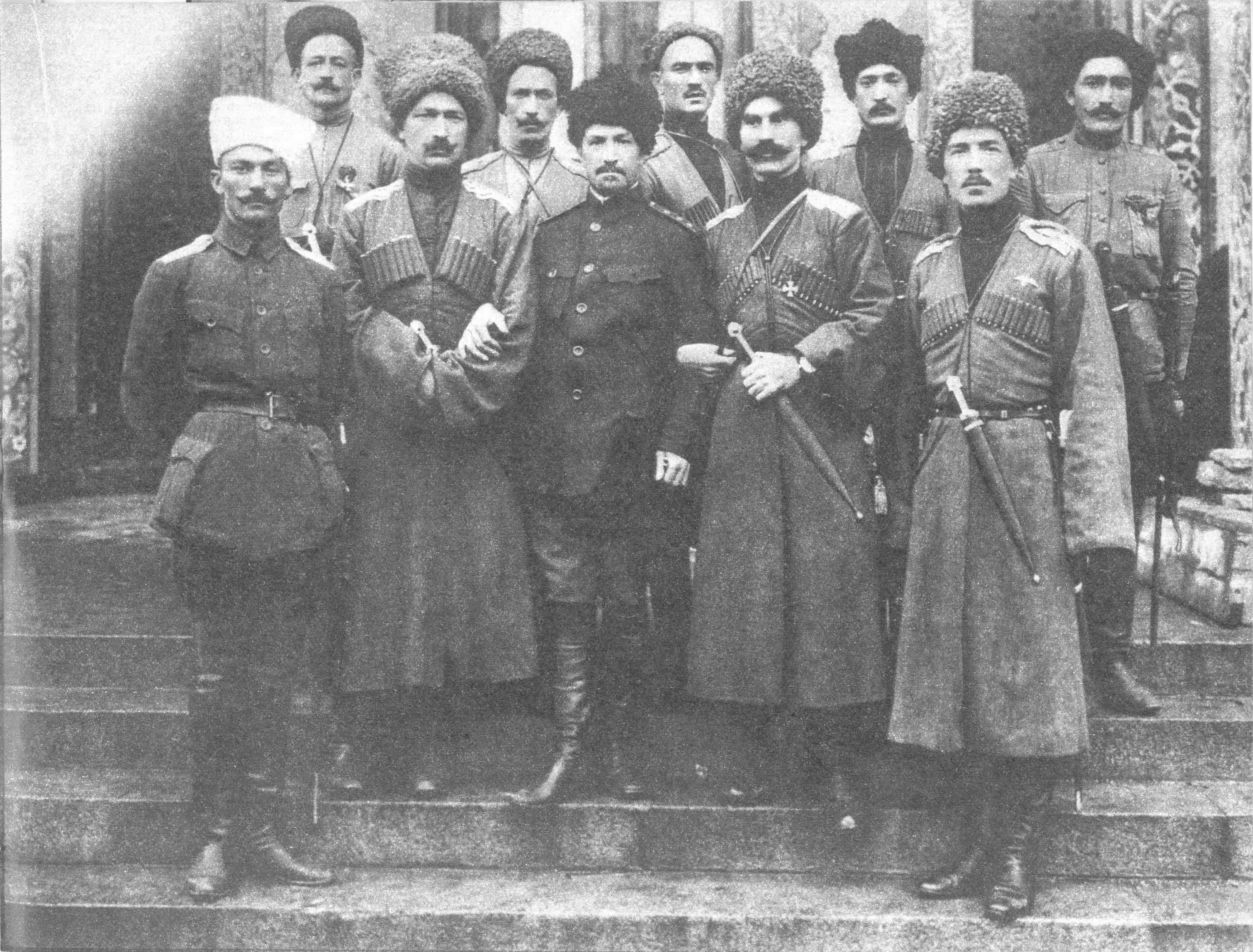
Kornilov's supporters from the Wild Division at the Petrograd Mosque, August 1917

In early October, the newly formed division conducted a parade in Vladikavkaz, the division's units then began transferring to Vinnytsia and Proskurov. On 15 November, the division was dispatched to Lviv, where it became part of the 2nd Cavalry Corps of the Southwestern Front. On 28 November, it began its march towards the front line at Sambir. On 30 November, the division crossed the border from Russia into Austria-Hungary. On 8 December, the Circassian Regiment clashed with the enemy at Terky and Volkovya.

On the night of 30/31 December, three dismounted sotnias of the Kabardin Regiment attacked a battalion of Tyrolean riflemen supported by four machine-guns in the village of Vetlino. Ejecting the defenders and holding the village until the arrival of reinforcements. After a nine-hour long firefight the Austrians retreated, 15 Austrians were taken prisoner while the Kabardins lost 21 men killed and wounded. On 1 January 1915, Michael Alexandrovich departed Lviv for Gatchina on leave. On 8 January, the 1st Brigade seized the village of Beregy-Gorne, holding it until 16:00 p.m. Whereupon the Austrians brought in their reserves and opened heavy machine-gun fire, forcing the Russian forces to withdraw. Shortly afterwards, the Austro-Hungarian forces initiated an offensive in the sector of the front held by the division, which prompted Michael Alexandrovich to return to Lviv on 14 January. Between the 14 and 25 January, the division held its ground against two Austro-Hungarian divisions. On 28 January 1915, fighting took place at Berezhky village.

Between 26 and 27 February, the Kabardin Regiment defended the Lomnica river crossing at Podgorka against several Austrian attacks, while being targeted by heavy shelling. The regiment lost three killed and 29 wounded in the fighting. The Ingush and Circassian Regiments crossed the Lomnica river under heavy enemy fire a week later. They then attacked the Tsu Babina village, which was held by an Austrian infantry battalion supported by six machine-guns, and dislodged the defenders. The Austrians lost 323 men killed and 54 captured. On 6 March, Michael Alexandrovich personally led the division in an offensive on Tlumach, defeating two Austrian battalions and seizing the town. He was later awarded the Saint George Sword for the action.

On 15 March, the division was assigned to the left bank of the Dniester, holding the section of the front between Nizhniy and Zalishchyky. On 30 March, the division’s positions at Zhezhava became the target of heavy shelling; an Austrian landing party that attempted to cross the river was repulsed. On 6 May, the 2nd Cavalry Corps was ordered to assist the 33rd Army Corps in establishing a bridgehead on the right bank of the Dniester between Korniov and Bedyntse. At 24:00 p.m. 12 May, the 1st Brigade crossed the Dniester at Ivanie, the following noon the 2nd Brigade used a pontoon bridge to advance towards Usechko. The two brigades then converged on Gorodnitsy. On 13 May, the division pursued enemy columns that were retreating towards Verenchanka, clashing with dismounted enemy cavalry in the vicinity of the town and taking 31 prisoners, a mortar and crates with 60 mortar shells and 120 grenades. On 14 May, the 2nd Brigade captured Nepolokota while the 1st and 3rd Brigades took over Beleluia and Ustie nad Prutom. On 15 May, the 3rd Brigade occupied the Karlov and Vidinov villages. On 18 May, the 1st Brigade repelled an attack on the two villages. On 19 May, the division was tasked with holding the section of the front from Vidinov to Snyatun. On 22 May, the division thwarted another enemy assault on Karlov. On 24 May, the division was reassigned to the Vidinov-Budylov sector of the front. At 19:00 p.m. on 28 May, an Austrian heavy-artillery barrage destroyed the Vidinov railway station.

A large-scale Austrian offensive forced the division to withdraw to the right bank of the Prut, and by the middle of May it had returned to its initial positions on the Dniester. On 4 June, the division took part in the Brusilov Offensive of June to September 1916, advancing along the right bank of the Dniester towards Chernivtsi, taking Okno village two days later. On 11 June, the division counter-attacked against the Austrians who had attempted to establish a bridgehead at Zhezhava. The division continued to pursue the Austrians, taking the villages Luzhany, Shepenice and Altmaeshti on the left bank of the Prut, taking 1,320 prisoners in the process.

In October 1915, the Russian High Command began forming reserve sotnias for each of the Savage Division's regiments, due to heavy casualties among its ranks. By March 1916, the division had lost 23 officers and 260 riders killed, as well as 144 officers and 1,438 riders wounded. On 27 July 1916, the Russian Zaamur Infantry Division launched two unsuccessful frontal attacks on Ezerzhany, suffering casualties and being forced to withdraw. The 3rd Brigade of the Savage Division was then ordered to seize the village. On the dawn of the following day, the Ingush and Circassian Regiments charged on the village - the charge reinvigorated the Zaamur infantrymen, who followed suit. At 7:30 a.m., the Russian cavalry entered the village, exchanging fire and engaging in hand-to-hand combat with the defenders. By 8 a.m., the village had been cleared of enemy combatants, while the Ingush pursued those fleeing to the north. A second cavalry charge resulted in the capture of five 6-inch artillery pieces and 20 crates of ammunition. The 46th and 58th Prussian Infantry Regiments were annihilated, and 110 Germans were taken prisoner. The Russian cavalry lost 19 men killed, 58 wounded and 60 horses.

In the middle of October 1916, the 1st and 3rd Brigades were incorporated into the Romanian Front's 4th Army and were forwarded to Stanislavov. In December 1916, the division fought a series of battles in Roman and Bacău. In February 1917, the division was withdrawn to the Bessarabia Governorate, allowing its personnel to rest. The February Revolution and the subsequent Abdication of Nicholas II did not negatively affect the division's morale. In the middle of June 1917, the division joined the 12th Army Corps at Stanislavov in preparation of the Kerensky Offensive. On 8 July, the division launched an offensive on Kalush and Dolyna. On 12 July, the 1st Brigade and the 3rd Caucasus Cossack Division thwarted a German counter-offensive at Kalush.

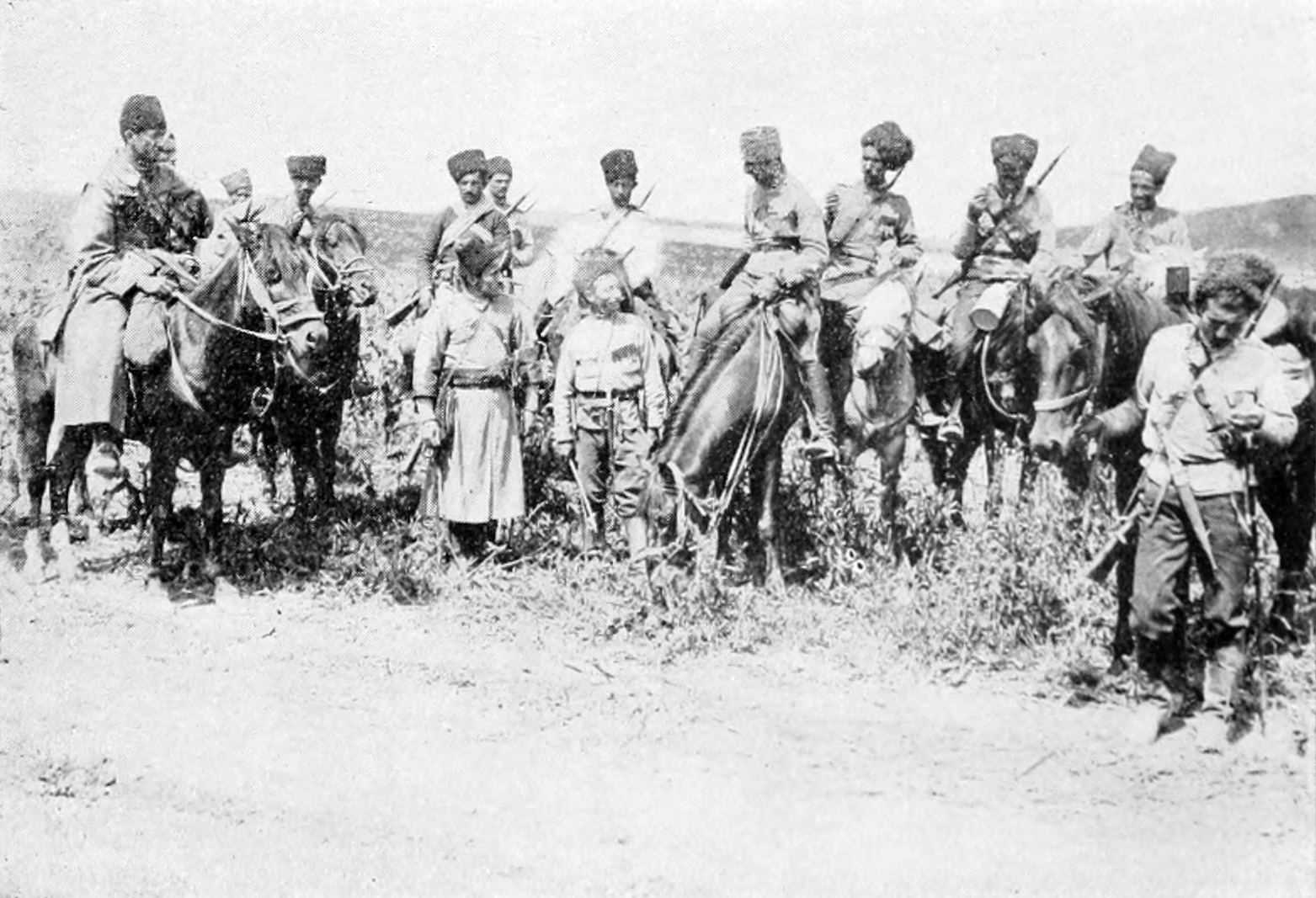
Сavalrymеn of Tatar Regiment in reconnaissance, July 1917

In August 1917, the division was dispatched to Novosokolniki, Pskov Governorate, where it became part of Aleksandr Krymov’s Separate Petrograd Army. On 4 September 1917, Lavr Kornilov transformed the Caucasian Native Cavalry Division into the Caucasian Native Cavalry Corps, by reinforcing it with the 1st Dagestan Regiment and Ossetian units. During the course of the Kornilov affair, the corps was among the units ordered by Kornilov to march on Petrograd. The corps was persuaded not to fight by members of the Central Committee of the Union of North Caucasian Peoples, who were participating in a Soviet Congress in Petrograd at the time. They hoisted a red flag carrying the inscription 'Land and Freedom', arresting their commanders and sending a delegation to Petrograd to plead allegiance to the government. In late October 1917, the corps now commanded by Peter Polovtsov, returned to the Caucasus. By the time of their arrival, the Petrograd government had lost its influence in the region. The corps dissolved in the ensuing anarchy.

During the course of the war, approximately 7,000 people served in the ranks of the division, 3,500 of whom received varying degrees of the Order of St. George and the Medal of St. George. Initially, non-Christians were awarded a different version of the order, which replaced St. George with the Imperial double-headed eagle. However upon the request of the riders the jigit was restored in the place of the "bird". During the period of its operation the unit did not record a single incident of desertion, while capturing a number of prisoners four times its own size. During the course of the Russian Civil War, many veterans of the Kabardin Regiment joined the ranks of the White Movement's Volunteer Army. In contrast, veterans of the Ingush Regiment enlisted into the army of the Mountainous Republic of the Northern Caucasus en masse.

== Memory ==
In 1920, N. N. Breshko-Breshkovsky's book "The Wild Division" was published in Riga. The book was reprinted several times.

In one of the episodes of Sergei Eisenstein's film "October: Ten Days That Shook the World" (1928), the Bolsheviks agitate the fighters of the "Wild Division" not to participate in the Kornilov revolt.

On June 9, 2012, a monument to the Ingush Cavalry Regiment of the Wild Division, created by sculptor Ravil Yusupov, was unveiled on the territory of the Memorial of Memory and Glory in Nazran.

The Memorial to Those Killed in the Fight against Terrorism, opened in Grozny in 2010, includes five stones on which the names of officers and riders of the Chechen Cavalry Regiment of the Wild Division are carved.
