= Alexander Polovtsov =

Russian historian (1832–1909)

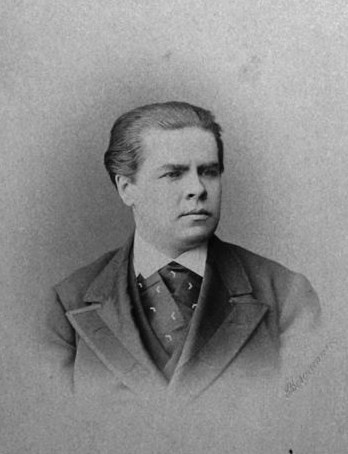
Polovtsov in 1865

Alexander Alexandrovich Polovtsov, Sr. (Russian: Александр Александрович Половцов; 12 June [O.S. 31 May] 1832 – 7 October [O.S. 24 September] 1909) was a Russian statesman, historian, and patron; he was also known as the founder of the Imperial Russian Historical Society, which was founded in 1866 and dissolved in 1917.

== Biography ==
Alexander was born to a medium-rank noble family known since the mid-17th century. His father, Alexander Andreevich Polovtsov (23 May [O.S. 11 May] 1805 - 21 May [O.S. 9 May] 1892), had his family estate in the Luga uyezd of the Governorate of St. Petersburg and served as a government bureaucrat working for the Governing Senate and later for the Ministry for the State Property. Alexander's mother, Agrafena Fedorovna (19 March [O.S. 7 March] 1811 — 23 July [O.S. 11 July] 1877), came from the Tatischev noble family; the historian Sergey Tatischev was Polovtsov's cousin.

Polovtsov graduated from the Imperial School of Jurisprudence and started his work in the 1st department of the Governing Senate.

On 15 February [O.S. 3 February] 1861, the 28-year-old Polovtsov married a 17-year-old girl named Nadezhda Mikhailovna Yunina (22 December [O.S. 10 December] 1843 - 22 July [O.S. 9 July] 1908), the only foster daughter of the first Chairman of the State Bank of the Russian Empire, Alexander von Stieglitz. According to popular belief, Nadezhda was an illegitimate daughter of Grand Duke Mikhail Pavlovich of Russia and an unknown lady-in-waiting. The marriage brought Polovtsov not only one million rubles of dowry and eventually 16-17 million rubles as Stieglitz's inheritance but also the aid of Emperor Alexander II, who was helping his alleged cousin. The couple went on to have four children together:

- Anna Alexandrovna Polovtsova (22 November [O.S. 10 November] 1861 – 20 August [O.S. 7 August] 1917), wife of Prince Alexander Dmitrievich Obolensky (1847–1917), grandmother of Sir Dimitri Obolensky;
- Nadezhda Alexandrovna Polovtsova (27 May [O.S. 15 May] 1865 - 7 March 1920), wife of Count Alexei Alexandrovich Bobrinsky;
- Alexander Alexandrovich Polovtsov, Jr. (28 July [O.S. 16 July] 1867 – 12 February 1944), a diplomat, husband of Countess Sofia Vladimirovna Panina (1871-1956) and Sofia Alexandrovna Kunitskaya (1884-1970);
- Peter Alexandrovich Polovtsov (24 June [O.S. 12 June] 1874 – 9 February 1964), a lieutenant general in the Imperial Russian Army.

In 1871, Polovtsov became a senator, and from 1873 he was the Secretary of State and simultaneously the State-Secretary of the Emperors Alexander II and Alexander III. From 1892 until his death in 1909, he was a member of the State Council.

Polovtsov was the initiator of the creation of the Russian Historical Society (created in 1865). He was the secretary of the society from 1866 to 1879 and the chairman of the society from 1879 until his death in 1909. The society commissioned works of such historians as Sergey Solovyov, Nikolay Kostomarov, Vasily Klyuchevsky who set the foundation for the History of Russia. Under Polovtsov, the society published 128 volumes of Sborniks of Russian Historical Society. Polovtsov also prepared the 25 volumes of the Russian Biographical Dictionary that played an important role as the source of the biographical data on Russian people. To correctly establish the notability, Polovtsov refused to include biographies of living people. Polovtsov (together with his father-in-law Alexander von Stieglitz) founded the Stieglitz Museum of Applied Arts.

== Gallery ==
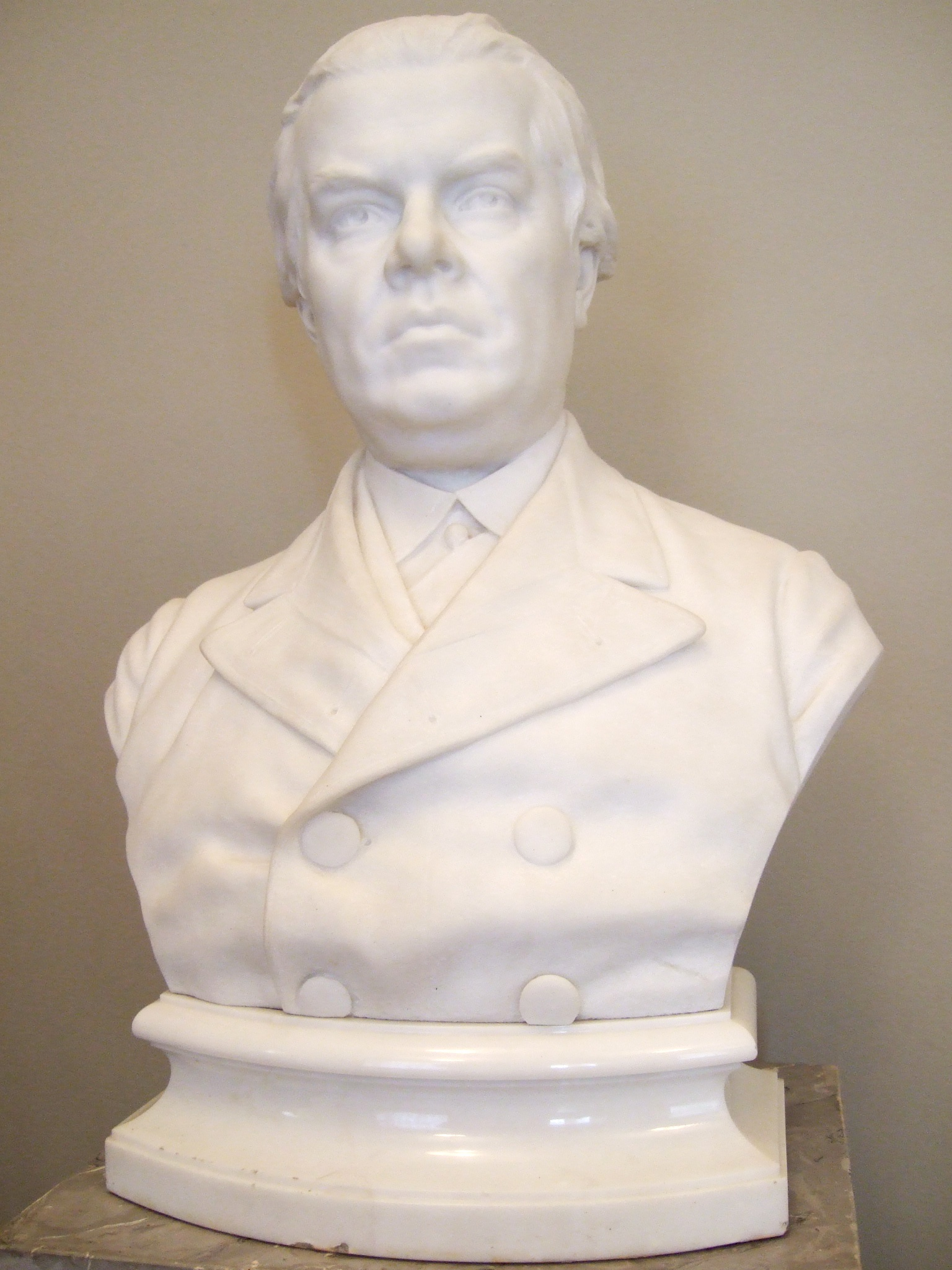
Sculpture of Polovtsov by Mark Antokolski

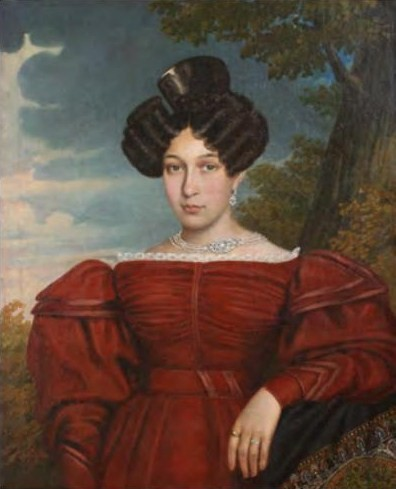
Portrait of Agrafena Fedorovna Polovtsova, 1831

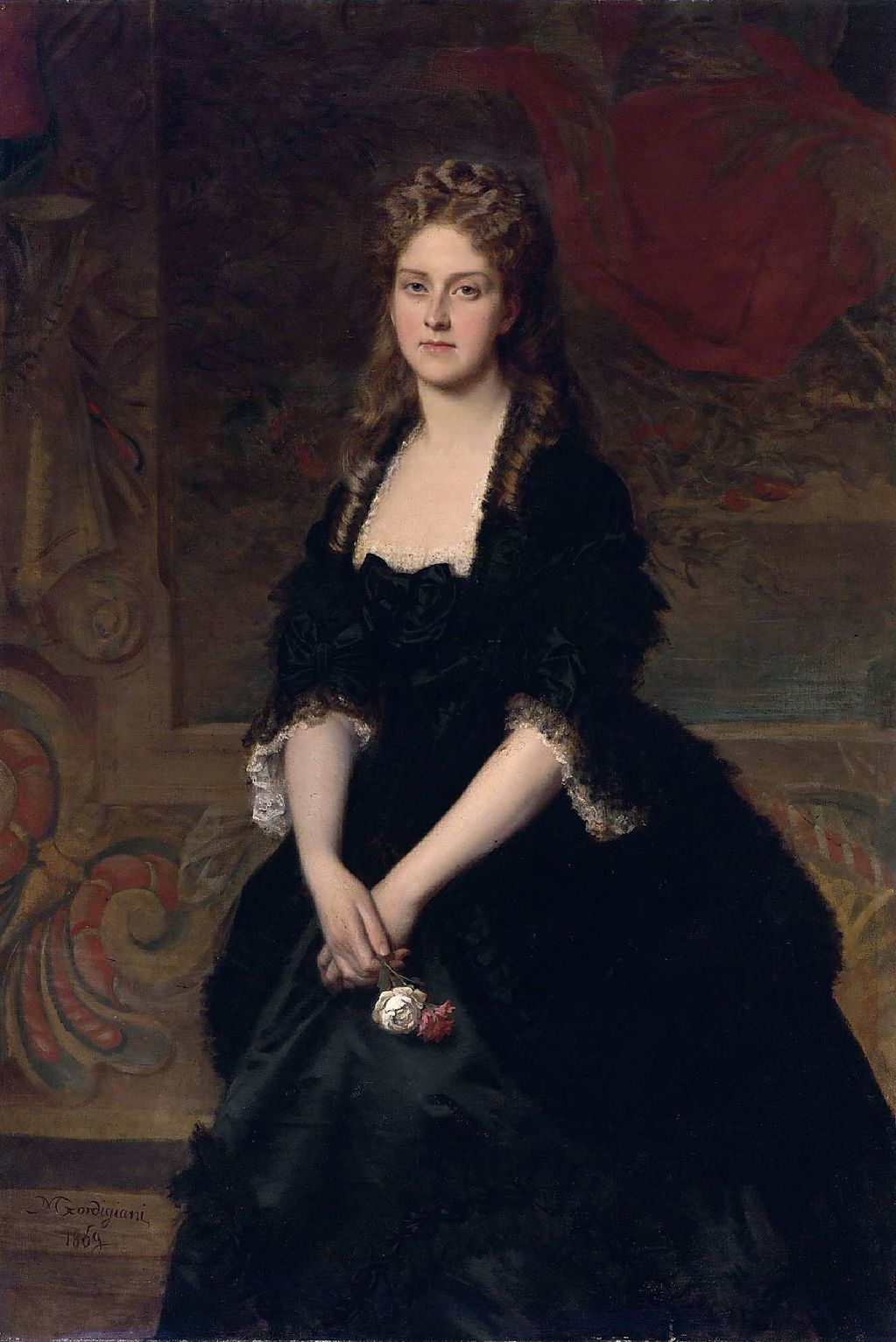
Portrait of Nadezhda Mikhailovna Polovtsova by Michele Gordigiani, 1869

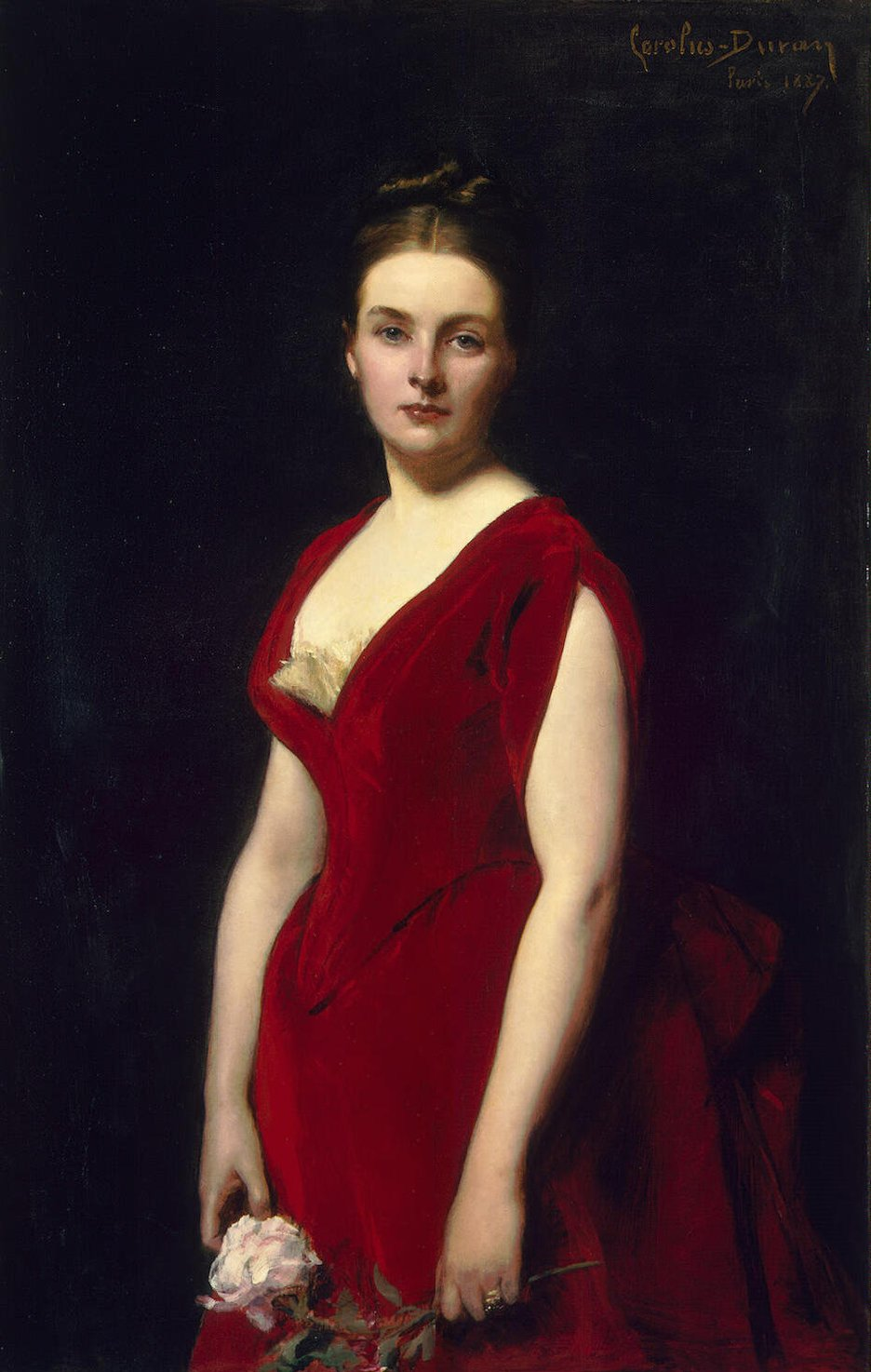
Portrait of Anna Alexandrovna Obolenskaya, 1887

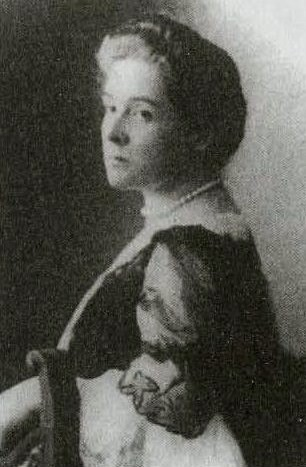
Photograph of Nadezhda Alexandrovna Bobrinskaya, 1890s

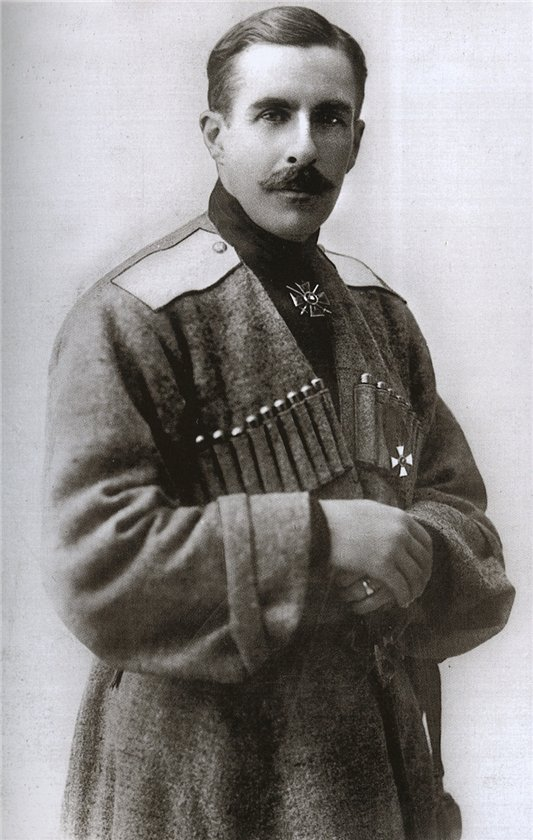
Photograph of Peter Alexandrovich Polovtsov
