= Russian Biographical Dictionary =

Russian-language biographical dictionary

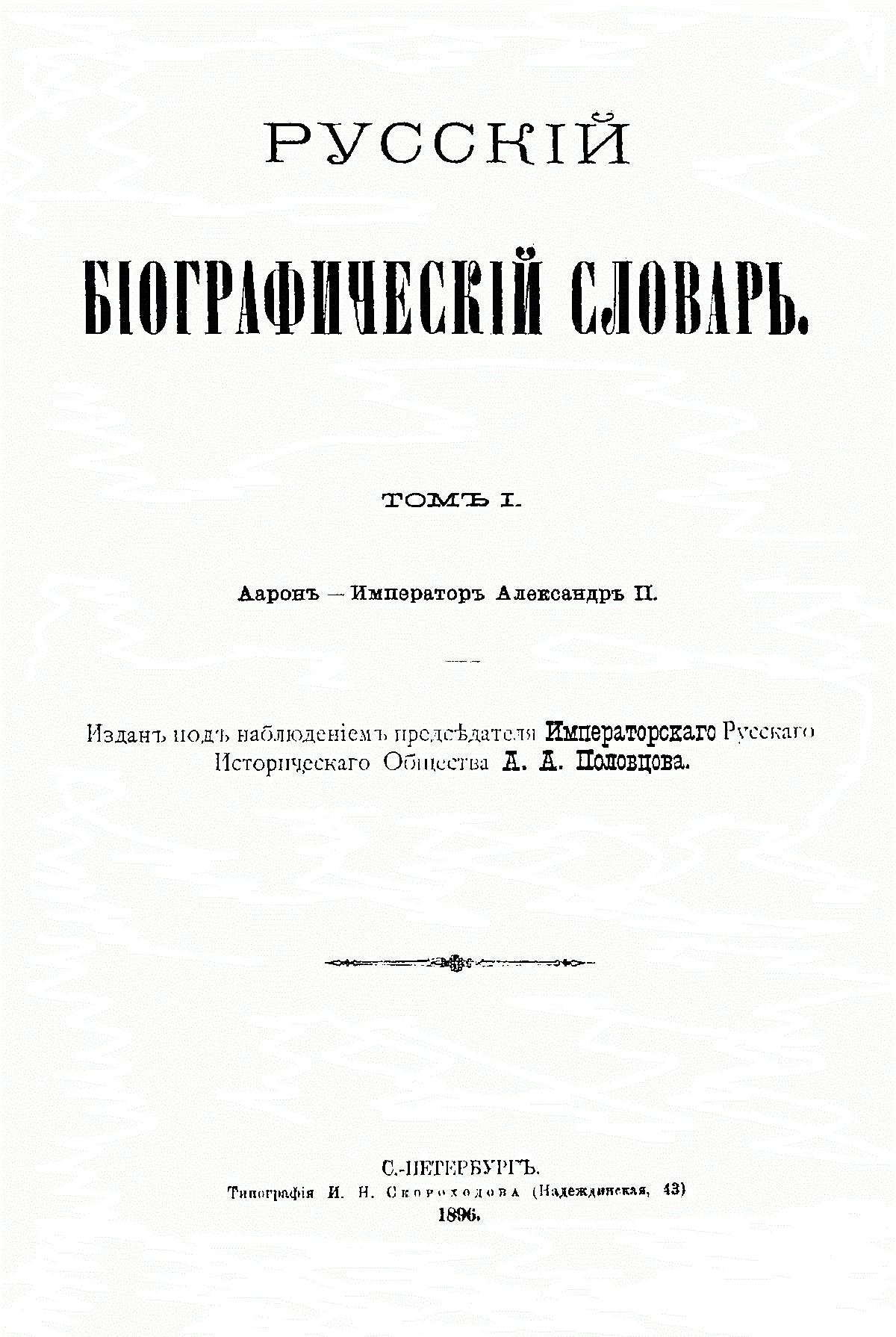
Title page of the first volume of the Russian Biographical Dictionary

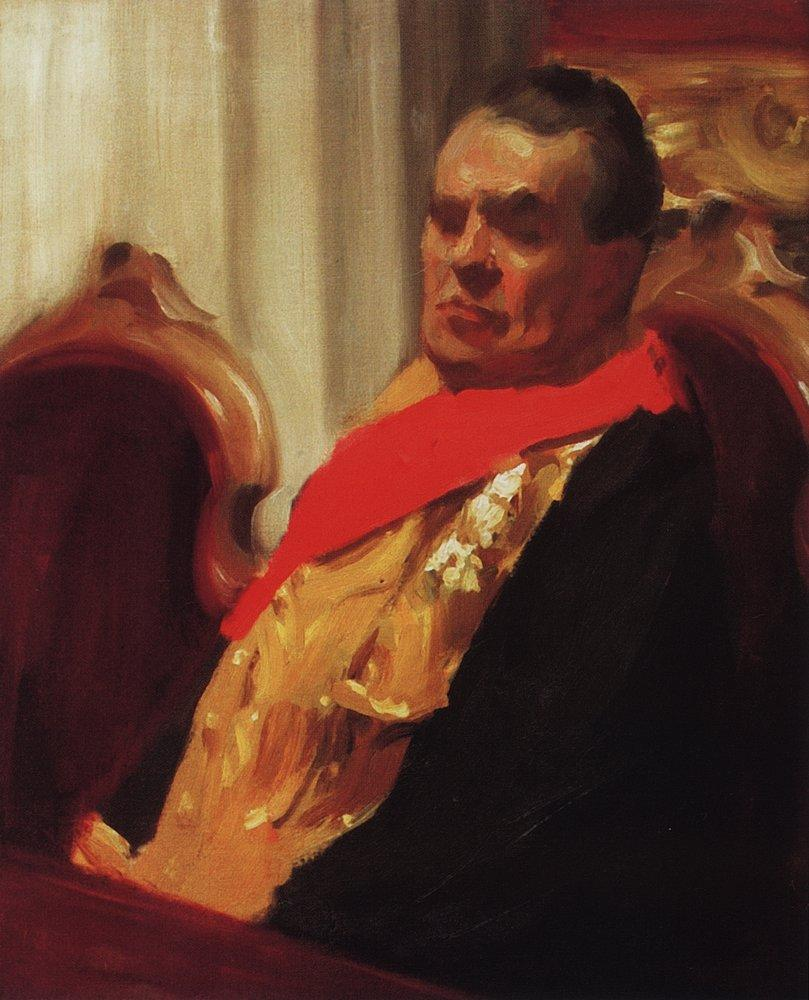
Portrait of A. A. Polovtsov by Boris Kustodiev

The Russian Biographical Dictionary (RBD; Russian: Русский биографический словарь) (Note: Pre-reform orthography: Русскій біографическій словарь) is a Russian-language biographical dictionary published by the Imperial Russian Historical Society and edited by a collective with Alexander Polovtsov as the editor-in-chief. The dictionary was published in 25 volumes from 1896 to 1918 and considered one of the most comprehensive Russian biographical sources for the 19th and early 20th century period.
