= Grand Duke Michael Alexandrovich of Russia =

Son of Tsar Alexander III (1878–1918)

Grand Duke Michael Alexandrovich
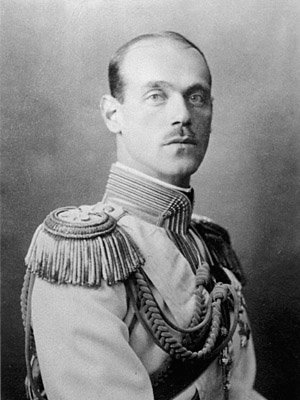
- Michael, circa 1914
- Born: 4 December [O.S. 22 November] 1878; Anichkov Palace, Saint Petersburg, Russia
- Died: 13 June 1918 (aged 39); Perm, Russia
- Cause of death: Gunshot wound (murder)
- Spouse: Natalia Brasova (m. 1912)
- Issue: George Mikhailovich, Count Brasov
Names
- Michael Alexandrovich Romanov
- House: Holstein-Gottorp-Romanov
- Father: Alexander III of Russia
- Mother: Dagmar of Denmark

Grand Duke Michael Alexandrovich of Russia (Russian: Михаил Александрович; 4 December [O.S. 22 November] 1878 – 13 June 1918) was the youngest son and fifth child of Emperor Alexander III of Russia and youngest brother of Nicholas II. He was designated Emperor of Russia after his brother abdicated in 1917 and proclaimed him "Emperor Michael II", but Michael declined to take power a day later.

Michael was born during the reign of his paternal grandfather, Alexander II. He was then fourth in line to the throne after his father and elder brothers Nicholas and George. After the assassination of his grandfather in 1881, he became third in line and, in 1894, after the death of his father, second in line. George died in 1899, leaving Michael as heir presumptive to Nicholas II.

The birth of Nicholas's son Alexei in 1904 moved Michael back to second in line, but Alexei was gravely ill with haemophilia and Michael suspected the boy would die, leaving him as heir. Michael caused a commotion at the imperial court when he took Natalia Sergeyevna Wulfert, a married woman, as a lover. Nicholas sent Michael to Orel to avoid scandal but this did not deter Michael, who travelled frequently to see his mistress. After the couple's only child, George, was born in 1910, Michael brought Natalia to Saint Petersburg, where she was shunned by society. In 1912, Michael shocked Nicholas by marrying Natalia in the hope that he would be removed from the line of succession. Michael and Natalia left Russia to live in exile abroad in France, Switzerland and England.

After the outbreak of World War I, Michael returned to Russia, assuming command of a cavalry division. When Nicholas abdicated on 15 March [O.S. 2 March] 1917, Michael was named as his successor instead of Alexei. Michael, however, deferred acceptance of the throne until ratification by an elected assembly. He was never confirmed as emperor and, following the Russian Revolution of 1917, he was imprisoned and murdered.

== Early life ==
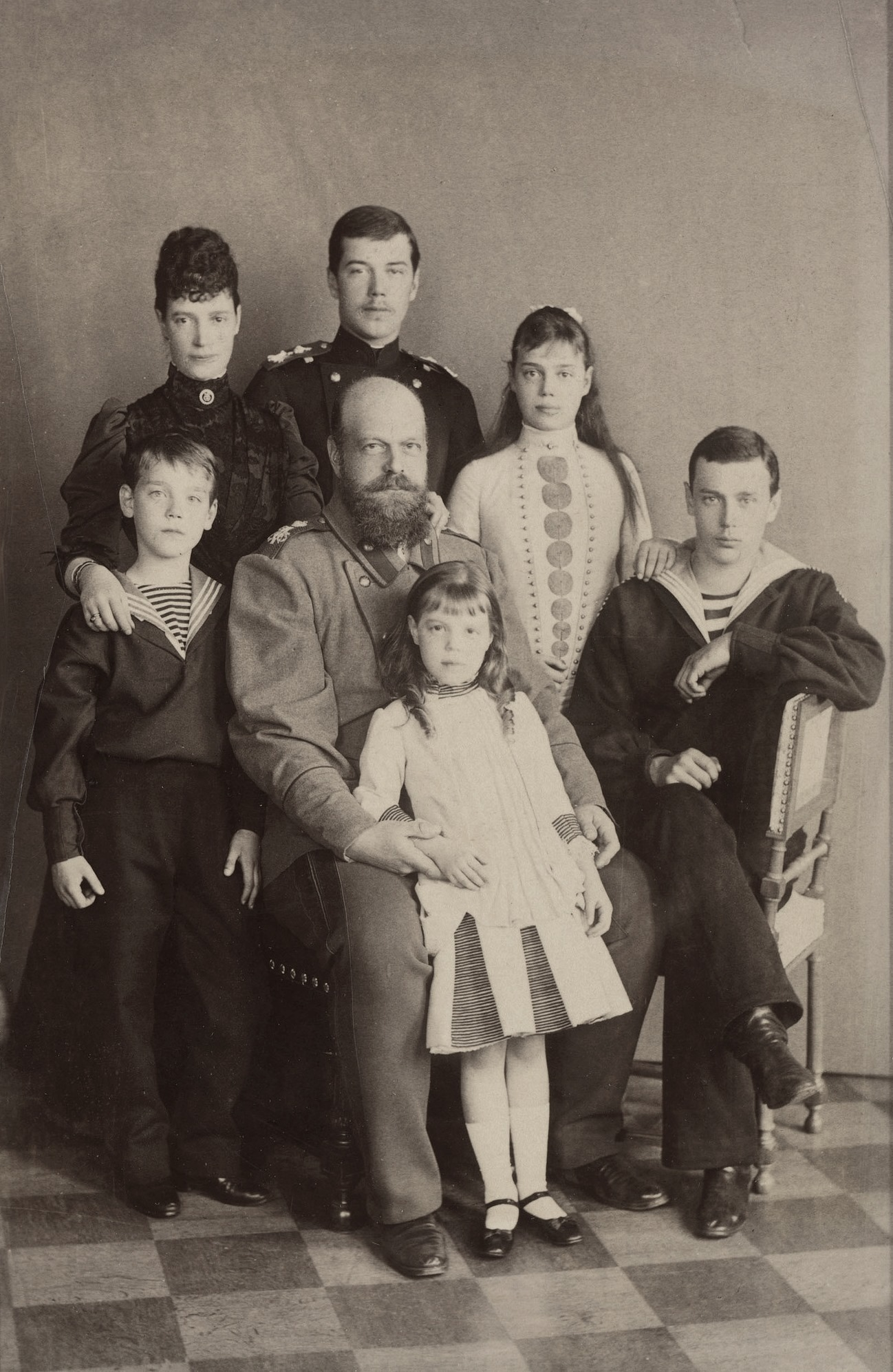
Grand Duke Michael (far left) with his parents and siblings. Back row (left to right): Empress Marie, Grand Duke Nicholas (later Nicholas II), Grand Duchess Xenia, Grand Duke George. Front: Grand Duchess Olga. Middle: Alexander III.

Michael was born at Anichkov Palace on Nevsky Prospekt in Saint Petersburg as the youngest son and penultimate child of Tsesarevich Alexander of Russia and his wife, Maria Feodorovna (Dagmar of Denmark). His maternal grandparents were King Christian IX of Denmark and Louise of Hesse-Kassel. His paternal grandmother Maria Alexandrovna (Marie of Hesse) died before his second birthday. His paternal grandfather, Emperor Alexander II of Russia, was assassinated on 1 March 1881 and, as a result, Michael's parents became Emperor and Empress of All the Russias before his third birthday. After the assassination, the new Tsar Alexander III moved his family, including Michael, to the greater safety of Gatchina Palace, which was 29 miles southwest of Saint Petersburg and surrounded by a moat.

Michael was raised in the company of his younger sister, Olga, who nicknamed him "Floppy" because he "flopped" into chairs; his elder siblings and parents called him "Misha". Conditions in the nursery were modest, even spartan. The children slept on hard camp beds, rose at dawn, washed in cold water and ate a simple porridge for breakfast. Michael, like his siblings, was taught by private tutors and was cared for by an English nanny, Mrs Elizabeth Franklin.

Michael and Olga frequently went on hikes in the forests around Gatchina with their father, who took the opportunity to teach them woodsmanship. Physical activities such as equestrianism were also taught at an early age, as was religious observance. Though Christmas and Easter were times of celebration and extravagance, Lent was strictly observed—meat, dairy products and any form of entertainment were avoided. Family holidays were taken in the summer at Peterhof Palace and with Michael's grandparents in Denmark.

Michael was almost 16 when his father fell fatally ill; the annual trip to Denmark was cancelled. On 1 November 1894, Alexander III died at the untimely age of 49. Michael's eldest brother, Nicholas, became Tsar, and Michael's childhood was effectively over.

== Military career and public duties ==
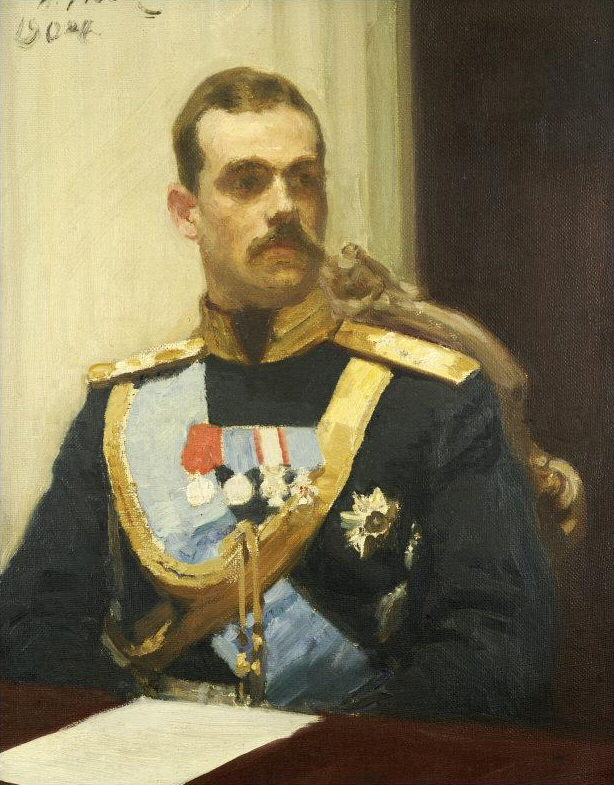
Oil painting by Ilya Repin of Michael at the State Council, 1901

Michael's mother, Dowager Empress Marie, moved back to Anichkov Palace with Michael and Olga. Like most male members of his family, Michael was enrolled in the military. He completed training at a gunnery school and joined the Horse Guards Artillery. In November 1898, he attained legal adulthood and, just eight months later, became heir presumptive to Nicholas as the middle brother, George, was killed in a motorcycle accident. George's death and the subsequent change in the line of succession highlighted that Nicholas lacked a son. While women could inherit the throne they could only do so upon the extinction of all male dynasts, as the Emperor had brothers his daughters were thus ineligible. When Nicholas's wife, Alexandra, became pregnant in 1900 she hoped that the child would be male. She manoeuvred to get herself declared regent for her unborn child in the event of Nicholas's death, but the government disagreed and determined that Michael would succeed regardless of the unborn child's gender. She was delivered of a fourth daughter the following year.

Michael was perceived as unremarkable, quiet and good-natured. He performed the usual public duties expected of an heir to the throne. In 1901, he represented Russia at the funeral of Queen Victoria and was given the Order of the Bath. The following year he was made a Knight of the Garter in King Edward VII's coronation honours. In June 1902, Michael transferred to the Blue Cuirassier Regiment and moved to Gatchina, where the regiment was based. Since coming of age, Michael had assumed financial independence. His assets included the largest sugar refinery in the country, capital amounting to millions of roubles, a collection of motor vehicles, and country estates at Otrovo in Russian Poland and Brasovo near Orel.

Michael was heir presumptive until 12 August 1904, when the birth of Tsarevich Alexei to Nicholas and Alexandra provided an heir apparent. Michael again became second-in-line to the throne, but was named as co-regent for the boy, along with Alexandra, in the event of Nicholas's death.

== Romances ==
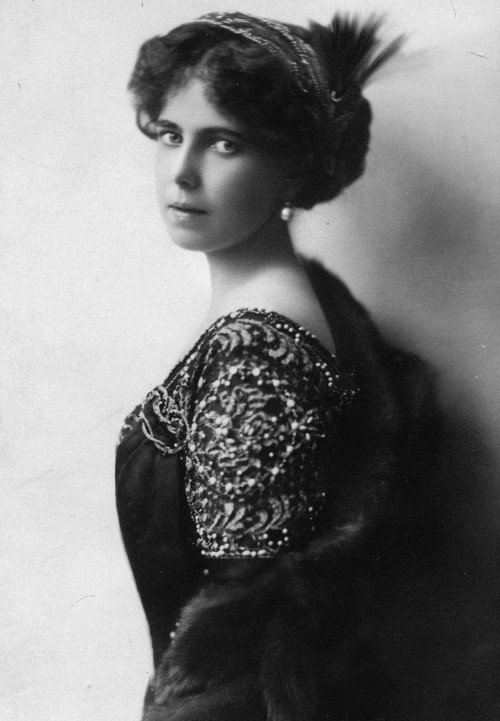
Princess Beatrice of Saxe-Coburg and Gotha

In 1902, Michael met Princess Beatrice of Saxe-Coburg and Gotha. They fell in love and began to correspond in her native English. Michael spoke both French and English fluently. At first it seemed they would marry; however, the Eastern Orthodox Church prohibited the marriage of first cousins, and Michael's father and Beatrice's mother were siblings. Nicholas refused to permit the marriage and, to Michael's and Beatrice's mutual dismay, their romance ended.

Michael's attention turned to Alexandra Kossikovskaya (September 1875, Orel region – 1923, Berlin), known affectionately as "Dina", who was his sister Olga's lady-in-waiting. Dina's father, Vladimir Kossikovsky, was a lawyer and Dina was a commoner. Michael rejected the notion, proposed by his friends, that he keep her as a mistress, and in July 1906, he wrote to Nicholas asking permission to marry her. Nicholas and Dowager Empress Marie were appalled. Both felt that royalty should marry royalty and, according to Russian house law, any children of a marriage between a royal and a commoner would be ineligible for the succession. Nicholas threatened to revoke Michael's army commission and exile him from Russia if he married without his permission. Marie had Dina dismissed as Olga's lady-in-waiting and took Michael to Denmark until mid-September.

Shortly after his return to Russia, three British newspapers announced on 24 September 1906 that Michael was to marry Princess Patricia of Connaught, but neither he nor Patricia knew anything about it. Buckingham Palace issued a denial. Nevertheless, two years later, in October 1908, Michael visited London, and he and Patricia were "paired" at social engagements. It seems likely that Michael's mother was plotting to get him married to a more suitable bride and the originator of the false report, Reuters correspondent Guy Beringer, read too much into the plans. Michael and Dina were planning to elope, but their plans were stymied as Dina was under surveillance by the Okhrana, Nicholas's secret police, and she was prevented from travelling. Under family pressure and unable to see Dina, by August 1907 Michael appeared to be losing interest. Dina went to live abroad. She never married and believed herself to be Michael's rightful fiancée, but their romance was over.

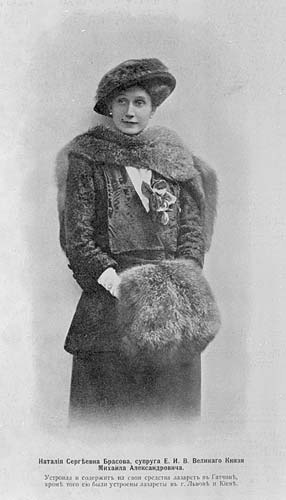
Natalia Brasova

In early December 1907, Michael was introduced to Natalia Sergeyevna Wulfert, the wife of a fellow officer, and from 1908 they began a deep friendship. Natalia was a commoner who had a daughter from her first marriage. By August 1909, they were lovers, and, by November 1909, Natalia was living apart from her second husband in an apartment in Moscow paid for by Michael. In an attempt to prevent scandal, Nicholas transferred Michael to the Chernigov Hussars at Orel, 250 miles from Moscow, but Michael travelled from there several times a month to see Natalia. Their only child, George (named after Michael's dead brother) was born in July 1910, before her divorce from her second husband was finalised. To ensure that the child could be recognised as his, rather than Wulfert's, Michael had the date of the divorce back-dated. Nicholas issued a decree giving the boy the surname "Brasov", taken from Michael's estate at Brasovo, which was a tacit acknowledgement that Michael was the father.

In May 1911, Nicholas permitted Natalia to move from Moscow to Brasovo and granted her the surname "Brasova". In May 1912, Michael went to Copenhagen for the funeral of his uncle King Frederik VIII of Denmark, where he fell ill with a stomach ulcer that was to trouble him for years afterwards. After a holiday in France, where he and Natalia were trailed by the Okhrana, Michael was transferred back to Saint Petersburg to command the Chevalier Gardes. He took Natalia to the capital with him and set her up in an apartment, but she was shunned by society and, within a few months, he had moved her to a villa in Gatchina.

== Marriage ==
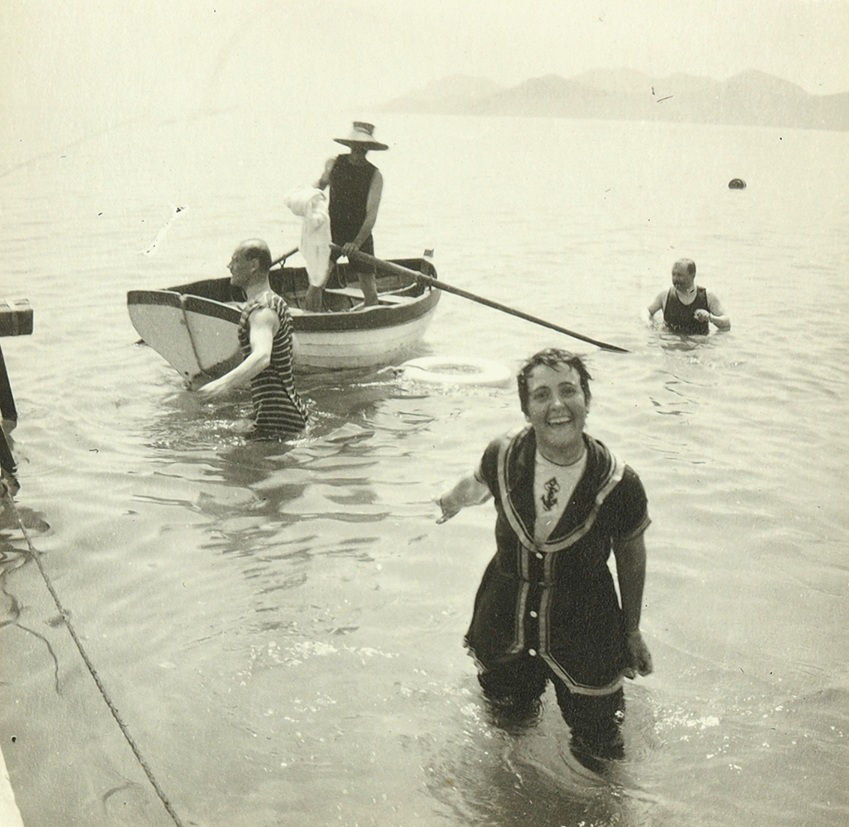
Michael and Natalia Brasova on a lake, c. 1912

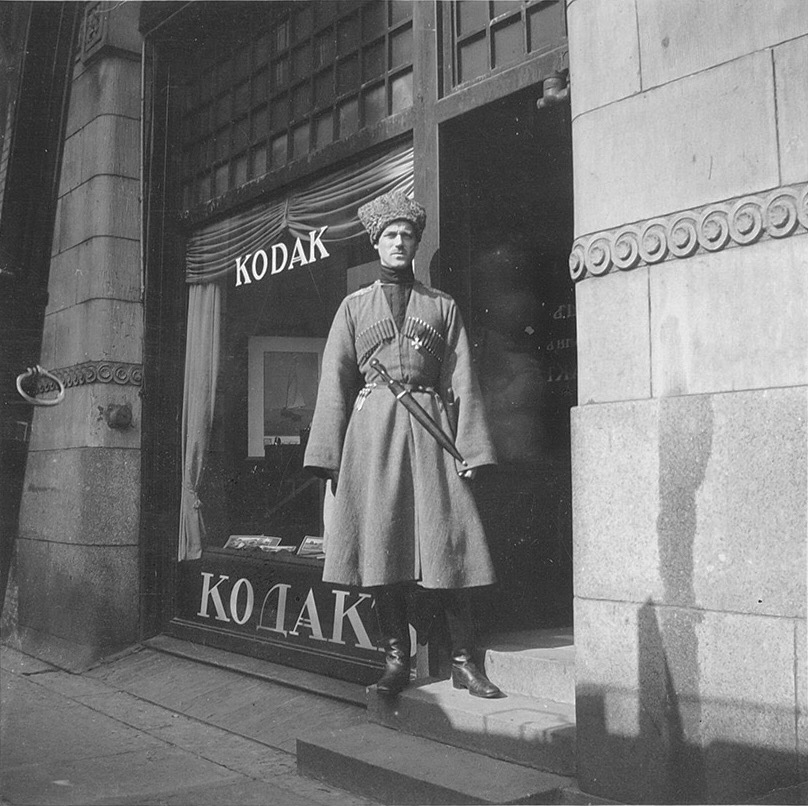
Michael in front of the Kodak shop in Saint Petersburg, c. 1912. He loved photography.

In September 1912, Michael and Natalia spent a holiday abroad and, as usual, they were trailed by the Okhrana. In Berlin, Michael announced that he and Natalia would drive to Cannes and instructed his staff to follow by train. The Okhrana was under instructions to follow by train rather than car, so Michael and Natalia would be unaccompanied on their journey south. Michael's journey was a deliberate ruse. On the way to Cannes, the couple diverted to Vienna, where they were married on 16 October 1912 by Father Misitsch at the Serbian Orthodox Church of Saint Sava. A few days later, after travelling through Venice and Milan, they arrived at Cannes, where George and Natalia's daughter from her first marriage joined them. Two weeks after the marriage, Michael wrote to his mother and brother to inform them. They were both horrified by Michael's action. His mother said it was "unspeakably awful in every way", and his brother was shocked that his brother had "broken his word ... that he would not marry her".

Nicholas was particularly upset because his heir, Alexei, was gravely ill with haemophilia, which Michael cited as one of his reasons for marrying Natalia. Michael feared that he would become heir presumptive again on Alexei's death and would never be able to marry Natalia. By marrying her beforehand, he would be removed from the line of succession early and preclude losing Natalia. In a series of decrees over December 1912 and January 1913, Nicholas relieved Michael of his command, banished him from Russia, froze all his assets in Russia, seized control of his estates and removed him from the Regency. Society in Russia was shocked at the severity of Nicholas's reprisal, but there was little sympathy for Natalia. She was not entitled to be known as Grand Duchess; she instead used the style "Madame or Countess Brasova".

For six months, they stayed in hotels in France and Switzerland without any decrease in their standard of living. They were visited by Michael's sister Grand Duchess Xenia and cousin Grand Duke Andrew. In July 1913, they saw Michael's mother in London, who told Natalia "a few home truths", according to Xenia's diary. After another trip to continental Europe, Michael took a one-year lease on Knebworth House, a staffed and furnished stately home 20 miles north of London. Michael's finances were stretched as he had to rely on remittances sent from Russia at Nicholas's command, and Nicholas still controlled all his estates and assets.

== War ==
Upon the outbreak of World War I in 1914, Michael telegraphed the Emperor, requesting permission to return to Russia to serve in the army – providing his wife and son could come too. Nicholas agreed, and Michael travelled back to Saint Petersburg via Newcastle upon Tyne, Norway, Sweden and Finland. Michael had already leased Paddockhurst in Sussex, an estate larger than Knebworth, and had planned to move there on the expiry of the Knebworth lease. He moved his furniture and furnishings there. The war was not expected to last long and the couple assumed they would be moving back to England at its conclusion. In the meantime, Michael offered its use to the British military. At Saint Petersburg, renamed Petrograd in September [O.S. August] 1914, they moved into a villa at 24 Nikolaevskaya street, Gatchina, that Michael had bought for Natalia. Natalia was not permitted to live in any of the imperial palaces.

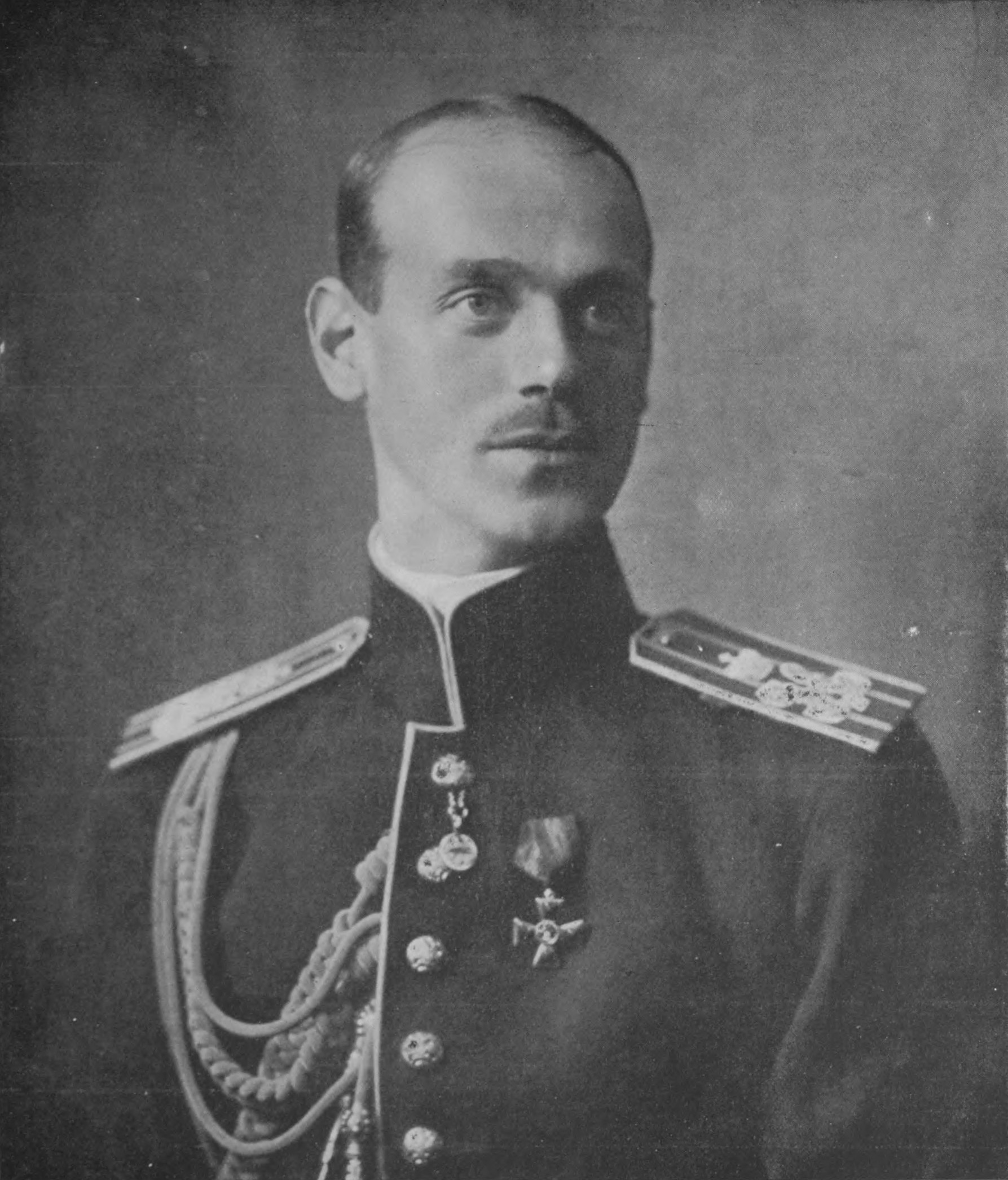
Michael, 1917

The Grand Duke, promoted from his previous rank of colonel to major-general, received command of a newly formed division: the Caucasian Native Cavalry, which became known as the "Savage Division". The appointment was perceived as a demotion because the division mostly comprised new Muslim recruits rather than the elite troops that Michael had commanded previously. The six regiments in the division were each composed of a different ethnic group: Chechens, Dagestanis, Kabardin, Tatars, Circassians and Ingush, commanded by ethnic Russian officers. The men were all volunteers, as conscription did not apply to the Caucasus. Although it was difficult to maintain discipline, they formed an effective fighting force. For his actions commanding his troops in the Carpathian Mountains in January 1915 Michael earned the military's highest honour, the Order of St. George, 4th Class. Unlike his brother the Emperor, he proved a popular military leader.

By January 1915 the horrific nature of the war had become apparent. Michael felt "greatly embittered towards people in general and most of all towards those who are at the top, who hold power and allow all that horror to happen. If the question of war were decided by the people at large, I would not be so passionately averse to that great calamity." Michael confessed in a letter to his wife that he felt "ashamed to face the people, i.e. the soldiers and officers, particularly when visiting field hospitals, where so much suffering is to be seen, for they might think that one is also responsible, for one is placed so high and yet has failed to prevent all that from happening and protect one's country from this disaster."

At the start of the war, Michael wrote to Nicholas asking him to legitimise his son in order that the boy would be provided for in the event of Michael's death at the front. Eventually Nicholas agreed to make George legitimate and granted him the style of "Count Brasov" by decree on 26 March 1915.

== Retreat ==
By June 1915, the Russians were in retreat. When Grand Duke Constantine died that month, Michael was the only member of the imperial family absent from the funeral in Petrograd. Natalia chided him for his absence and Michael retorted that it was simply wrong for his relatives to abandon their units to attend Constantine's funeral at such a time. The American war correspondent, Stanley Washburn, reported that Michael wore "a simple uniform with nothing to indicate his rank but shoulder straps of the same material as his uniform". Michael was "unaffected and democratic" and "living so simply in a dirty village". Natalia was appalled that Michael eschewed fancy uniforms and decorations for life at the front, but he was convinced "that at such a difficult time I must serve Russia and serve here at the front".

In July 1915, Michael caught diphtheria but recovered. The war was going badly for Russia and the following month Nicholas appointed himself Supreme Commander of the Russian forces. The move was not welcomed. Nicholas's bad decisions included instructing Michael to authorise a payment to a friend of Rasputin, an army engineer called Bratolyubov, who claimed to have invented a devastating flame-thrower. The claim was bogus and Bratolyubov was arrested for fraud, but Rasputin intervened and he was released. Michael appeared gullible and naïve; a friend of Natalia's said he "trusted everybody ... Had his wife not watched over him constantly, he would have been deceived at every step."

In October 1915, Michael regained control of his estates and assets from Nicholas and, in February 1916, was given command of the 2nd Cavalry Corps, which included the Savage Division, a Cossack division and a Don Cossack division. The slights against him by the Tsar's retinue continued, though. When he was promoted to lieutenant-general in July 1916, unlike all other Grand Dukes who attained that rank, he was not appointed as an aide-de-camp to the Tsar with the rank of adjutant-general. Michael admitted that he "always despised Petrograd high society ... no people are more devious than they are; with a few exceptions, they are all scum." Michael made no public political statements, but it was assumed that he was a liberal, like his wife, and British consul Bruce Lockhart thought he "would have made an excellent constitutional monarch".

Throughout the summer of 1916, Michael's corps was involved in the Brusilov Offensive. The Guards Army suffered heavy losses under the incompetent leadership of Michael's uncle, Grand Duke Paul, who was removed from command. In contrast, Michael was awarded a second gallantry medal, the Order of St. Vladimir with Swords, for his part in actions against the enemy and was belatedly made an adjutant-general. The poor progress of the war and their almost constant separation depressed both Michael and Natalia. Michael was still suffering from stomach ulcers and, in October 1916, he was ordered to take leave in the Crimea.

Before leaving for his sister Xenia's estate at Ai-Todor, 12 miles from Yalta, he wrote a candid letter to his brother warning him that the political situation was tense:

I am deeply concerned and worried by what is happening around us. There has been a shocking alteration in the mood of the most loyal people ... which fills me with a most serious apprehension not only for you and for the fate of our family, but even for the integrity of the state order.
The public hatred for certain people who allegedly are close to you and who are forming part of the present government has, to my amazement, brought together the right, the left and the moderate; and this hatred, along with the demands for changes are already openly expressed.

== Increasing public unrest ==
Michael and other members of the imperial family, including Grand Dukes Alexander, George, Nicholas and Dmitri and Grand Duchess Elizabeth, warned of the growing public unrest, and of the perception that Nicholas was governed by his German-born wife Alexandra and the self-styled holy man Rasputin. Nicholas and Alexandra refused to listen. In December 1916, Dmitri and four of his friends killed Rasputin. Michael learned of the murder at Brasovo, where he was spending Christmas with his family. On 28 December, according to the French ambassador, there was a failed attempt to assassinate Alexandra; the lone assailant was caught and hanged the next day. The Duma President Mikhail Rodzianko, Grand Duchess Marie Pavlovna and British ambassador Buchanan joined calls for Alexandra to be removed from influence, but Nicholas still refused to take their advice. Plots and gossip against Nicholas and Alexandra continued to build.

In January 1917, Michael returned to the front to hand over command of his corps; from 29 January he was Inspector-General of Cavalry stationed at Gatchina. General Aleksei Brusilov, Michael's commander on the south-eastern front, begged him to tell the Tsar of "the need for immediate and drastic reforms", but Michael warned him, "I have no influence ... My brother has time and time again had warnings and entreaties of this kind from every quarter." Brusilov recorded in his memoirs, "[Michael] was an absolutely honourable and upright man, taking no sides and lending himself to no intrigues ... he shunned every kind of gossip, whether connected with the services or with family matters. As a soldier, he was an excellent leader and an unassuming and conscientious worker."

Through February, Grand Duke Alexander, Duma President Rodzianko and Michael pressured Nicholas and Alexandra to yield to popular demands. Public unrest grew and, on 27 February, soldiers in Petrograd joined demonstrators, elements of the military mutinied and prisoners were freed. Nicholas, who was at army headquarters in Mogilev, prorogued the Duma, but the deputies refused to leave and instead set up their own rival government. After consulting Rodzianko at the Mariinsky Palace in Petrograd, Michael advised Nicholas to dismiss his ministers and set up a new government led by the leader of the majority party in the Duma, Georgy Lvov. His advice was supported by General Mikhail Alekseyev, Nicholas's chief of staff. Nicholas rejected the suggestion and issued futile orders for troops to move on Petrograd.

== Revolution ==
On the night of 27–28 February 1917, Michael attempted to return to Gatchina from Petrograd, where he had been in conference with Rodzianko and Nikolai Golitsyn and from where he had telegraphed the Tsar, but revolutionary patrols and sporadic fire prevented his progress. Revolutionaries patrolled the streets, rounding up people connected with the old regime. Michael managed to reach the Winter Palace, where he ordered the guards to withdraw to the Admiralty, because it afforded greater safety and a better tactical position, and because it was a less politically charged location. Michael himself took refuge in the apartment of an acquaintance, Princess Putyatina, on Millionnaya street. In the neighbouring apartments, the Tsar's Chamberlain Nikolai Stolypin and the Procurator of the Holy Synod were detained by revolutionaries and in the house next door General Baron Staekelberg was killed when his house was stormed by a mob.

On 1 March, Rodzianko sent guards to Putyatina's apartment to ensure Michael's safety, and Michael signed a document drawn up by Rodzianko and Grand Duke Paul proposing the creation of a constitutional monarchy. The newly formed Petrograd Soviet rejected the document, which became irrelevant. Calls for the Tsar's abdication had superseded it.

== Abdication of Nicholas II ==
On the afternoon of 15 March [O.S. 2 March] 1917, Emperor Nicholas II, under pressure from generals and Duma representatives, abdicated in favour of his son, Alexei, with Michael as Regent. Later that evening, though, he reconsidered his decision. Alexei was gravely ill with haemophilia and Nicholas feared that if Alexei was emperor, he would be separated from his parents. In a second abdication document, signed at 11.40 p.m. but marked as having been issued at 3.00 p.m., the time of the earlier one, Nicholas II declared:

We have judged it right to abdicate the Throne of the Russian State and to lay down the Supreme Power. Not wishing to be parted from Our Beloved Son, We hand over Our Succession to Our Brother the Grand Duke Michael Aleksandrovich and Bless Him on his accession to the Throne.

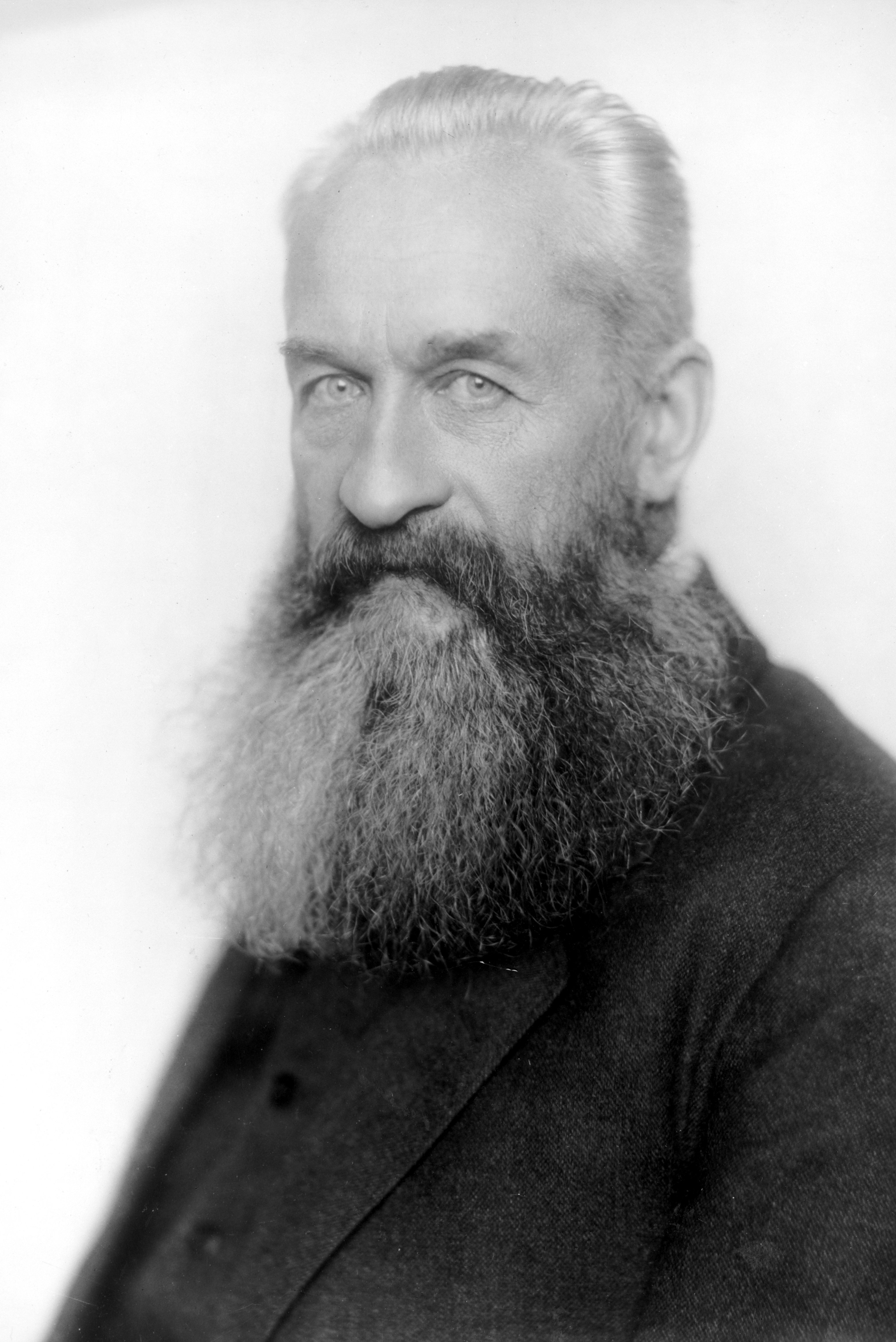
Prince Lvov, Prime Minister of Russia, March–July 1917

By early morning, Michael was proclaimed as "Emperor Michael II" to Russian troops and in cities throughout Russia, but his accession was not universally welcomed. While some units cheered and swore allegiance to the new emperor, others remained indifferent. The newly formed Provisional Government had not agreed to Michael's succession. When Michael awoke that morning, he discovered not only that his brother had abdicated in his favour, as Nicholas had not informed him previously, but also that a delegation from the Duma would visit him at Putyatina's apartment in a few hours' time. The meeting with Duma President Rodzianko, the new Prime Minister Prince Lvov and other ministers, including Pavel Milyukov and Alexander Kerensky, lasted all morning. Putyatina provided lunch, and in the afternoon two lawyers (Baron Nolde and Vladimir Nabokov) were called to the apartment to draft a manifesto for Michael to sign. The legal position was complicated, as the legitimacy of the government, whether Nicholas had the right to remove his son from the succession, and whether Michael actually was emperor, were all open to question. After further discussion, and several drafts, the meeting settled on a declaration of conditional acceptance as an appropriate form of words. In it, Michael deferred to the will of the people and acknowledged the Provisional Government as the de facto executive, but neither abdicated nor refused to accept the throne. He wrote:

Inspired, in common with the whole people, by the belief that the welfare of our country must be set above everything else, I have taken the firm decision to assume the supreme power only if and when our great people, having elected by universal suffrage a Constituent Assembly to determine the form of government and lay down the fundamental law of the new Russian State, invest me with such power.
Calling upon them the blessing of God, I therefore request all the citizens of the Russian Empire to submit to the Provisional Government, established and invested with full authority by the Duma, until such time as the Constituent Assembly, elected within the shortest possible time by universal, direct, equal and secret suffrage, shall manifest the will of the people by deciding upon the new form of government.

Commentators, ranging from Kerensky to French ambassador Maurice Paléologue, regarded Michael's action as noble and patriotic, but Nicholas was appalled that Michael had "kowtowed to the Constituent Assembly" and called the manifesto "rubbish".

The hopes of the monarchists that Michael might be able to assume the throne following the election of the Constituent Assembly were overtaken by events. His renunciation of the throne, though conditional, marked the end of the Tsarist regime in Russia. The Provisional Government had little effective power; real power was held by the Petrograd Soviet.

== Arrest ==
Alexander Kerensky, Prime Minister of Russia from July to October 1917

Michael returned to Gatchina and was not permitted to return to his unit or to travel beyond the Petrograd area. On 5 April 1917, he was discharged from military service. By July, Prince Lvov had resigned as Prime Minister to be replaced by Alexander Kerensky, who ordered ex-Emperor Nicholas removed from Petrograd to Tobolsk in the Urals because it was "some remote place, some quiet corner, where they would attract less attention". On the eve of Nicholas's departure, Kerensky gave permission for Michael to visit him. Kerensky remained present during the meeting and the brothers exchanged awkward pleasantries "fidgeting all the while, and sometimes one would take hold of the other's hand or the buttons of his uniform". It was the last time they saw each other.

On 21 August 1917, guards surrounded the villa on Nikolaevskaya street where Michael was living with Natalia. On the orders of Kerensky, they were both under house arrest, along with Nicholas Johnson, who had been Michael's secretary since December 1912. A week later, they were moved to an apartment in Petrograd. Michael's stomach problems worsened and, with the intervention of British ambassador George Buchanan and foreign minister Mikhail Tereshchenko, they were moved back to Gatchina in the first week of September. Tereshchenko told Buchanan that the Dowager Empress would be allowed to leave the country, for Britain if she wished, and that Michael would follow in due course. The British, however, were not prepared to accept any Russian Grand Duke for fear it would provoke a negative public reaction in Britain, where there was little sympathy for the Romanovs.

On 1 September 1917, Kerensky declared Russia a republic. Michael wrote in his diary: "We woke up this morning to hear Russia declared a Republic. What does it matter which form the government will be as long as there is order and justice?" Two weeks later, Michael's house arrest was lifted. Kerensky had armed the Bolsheviks after a power struggle with the commander-in-chief and in October there was a second revolution as the Bolsheviks seized power from Kerensky. With a permit to travel issued by Peter Polotsov, a former colleague of Michael from the Savage Division who was now a commander in Petrograd, Michael planned to move his family to the greater safety of Finland. They packed valuables and prepared to move, but their preparations were seen by Bolshevik sympathisers and they were placed once more under house arrest. The last of Michael's cars were seized by the Bolsheviks.

The house arrest was lifted again in November, and the Constituent Assembly was elected and met in January 1918. Despite being the minority party, the Bolsheviks dissolved it. On 3 March 1918 (N.S.), the Bolshevik government signed the Treaty of Brest-Litovsk, which effectively ceded vast areas of the former Russian Empire to the Central Powers of Germany, Austria-Hungary and the Ottoman Empire. On 7 March 1918, Michael and his secretary Johnson were re-arrested on the orders of Moisei Uritsky, the Head of the Petrograd secret police, and imprisoned at the Bolshevik headquarters in the Smolny Institute.

== Imprisonment ==
On 11 March 1918, Uritsky sent Michael and Johnson to Perm, a thousand miles to the east, on the order of the Council of the People's Commissars, which included both Vladimir Lenin and Joseph Stalin. The journey, by freight train in a coach without windows or heat, took eight days at an average speed of 5 miles per hour. At first, Michael was billeted in a hotel but two days after his arrival he was jailed by the local Soviet. Natalia lobbied the Commissars in Petrograd for his release and, on 9 April 1918, he was set at liberty within Perm. He moved into the best room in the best hotel in Perm, along with Johnson and two manservants, valet Vasily Chelyshev and former chauffeur Borunov. Natalia feared for George's safety, and in March 1918, she arranged for him to be smuggled out of Russia by his governess, Margaret Neame, with the help of Danish diplomats and the Putyatins.

In May, Natalia was granted a travel permit to join Michael. Accompanied by family friends Prince Putyatin and Margaret Abakanovich, she arrived at Perm before the Orthodox Easter and they spent about a week together. Meanwhile, as part of the truce between the Bolsheviks and the Central Powers, prisoners-of-war from Austria-Hungary were being shipped out of Russia. Czech troops were strung out along the Trans-Siberian Railway on their way to Vladivostok, where they were due to take ship. The Czechs, though, were not going home to fight for the Austrian empire but to fight for a separate homeland independent of Austria. The Germans demanded that the Bolsheviks disarm the Czechs, who fought back, seized the railway, joined forces with Russians fighting against the Bolsheviks and advanced westwards toward Perm. With the approach of the Czechs, Michael and Natalia feared that she would become trapped there, possibly in a dangerous situation and so, on 18 May, she left unhappily. By early June, Michael was again ill with stomach trouble.

== Death ==
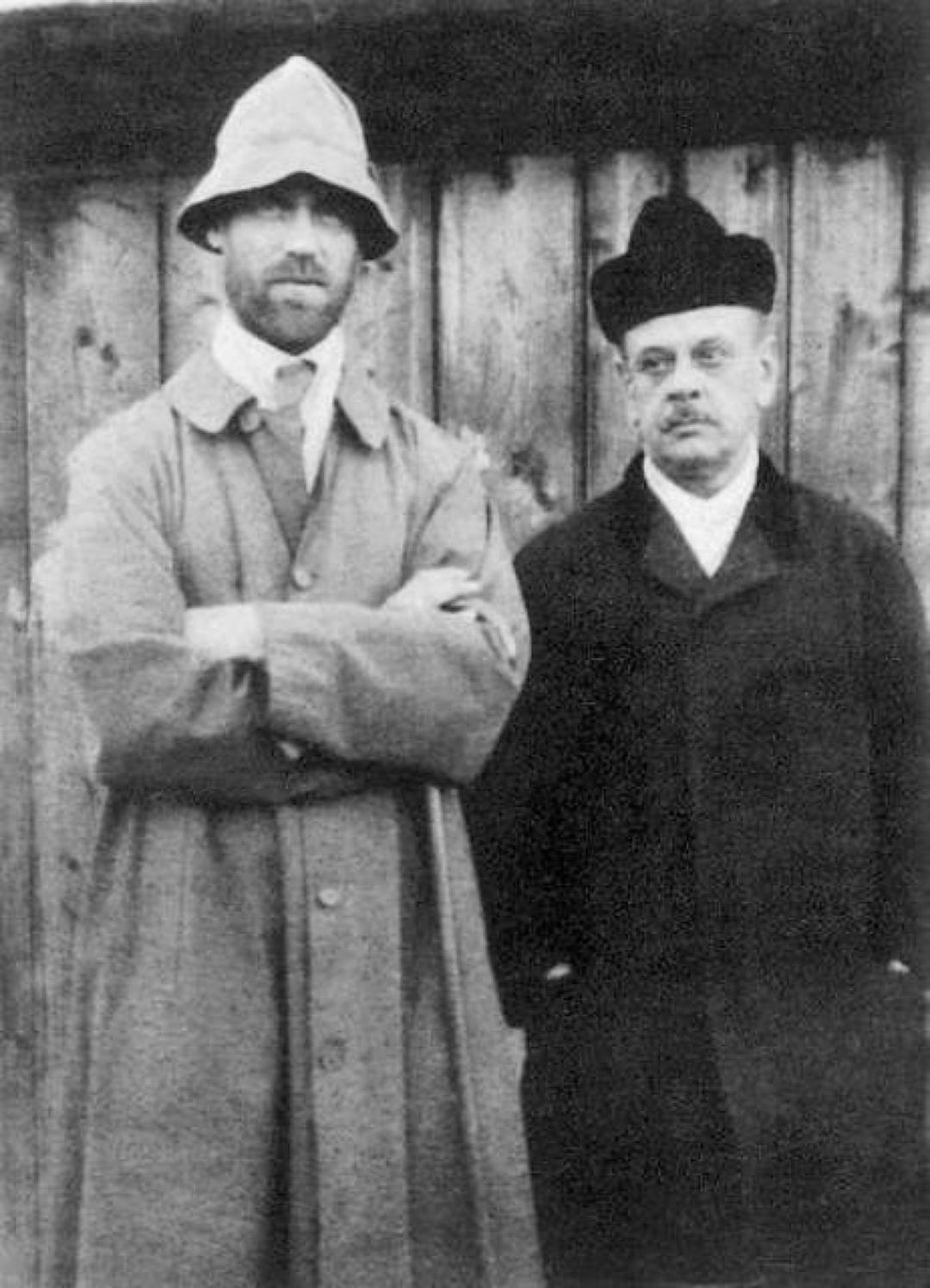
Michael (left) with Johnson in Perm, April 1918

On 12 June 1918, the leader of the local secret police, Gavril Myasnikov, with the connivance of other local Bolsheviks, hatched a plan to murder Michael. Myasnikov assembled a team of four men who, like him, were all former prisoners of the Tsarist regime: Vasily Ivanchenko, Ivan Kolpashchikov, Andrei Markov and Nikolai Zhuzhgov. Using a forged order, the four men gained entry to Michael's hotel at 11.45 p.m. At first, Michael refused to accompany the men until he spoke with the local chairman of the secret police, Pavel Malkov, and then because he was ill. His protestations were futile and he got dressed. Johnson insisted on accompanying him and the four men plus their two prisoners climbed into two horse-drawn three-seater traps.

They drove out of the town into the forest near Motovilikha. When Michael queried their destination, he was told they were going to a remote railway crossing to catch a train. By now it was the early hours of 13 June. They all alighted from the carriages in the middle of the wood, and both Michael and Johnson were fired upon, once each, but as the assassins were using home-made bullets, their guns jammed. Michael, who may or may not have been injured, moved towards the wounded Johnson with arms outstretched, when he was shot at point-blank range in the head. Both Zhuzhgov and Markov claimed to have fired the fatal shot. Johnson was shot dead by Ivanchenko.

The bodies were stripped and buried. Anything of value was stolen and the clothes were taken back to Perm. After they were shown to Myasnikov as proof of the murders, the clothes were burned. The Ural Regional Soviet, headed by Alexander Beloborodov, approved the killing, either retrospectively or beforehand, as did Lenin. Michael was the first of the Romanovs to be killed by the Bolsheviks, but he was not the last. Neither Michael's nor Johnson's remains have been found.

The Perm authorities distributed a concocted cover story that Michael was abducted by unidentified men and had disappeared. Chelyshev and Borunov were arrested. Shortly before his own arrest, Colonel Peter Znamerovsky, a former Imperial army officer also exiled to Perm, managed to send Natalia a brief telegram saying that Michael had disappeared. Znamerovsky, Chelyshev and Borunov were all killed by the Perm Bolsheviks. Soviet disinformation about Michael's disappearance led to unfounded rumours that he had escaped and was leading a successful counter-revolution. In the ultimately forlorn hope that Michael would ally with Germany, the Germans arranged for Natalia and her daughter to escape to Kiev in German-controlled Ukraine. On the collapse of the Germans in November 1918, Natalia fled to the coast, and she and her daughter were evacuated by the British Royal Navy.

Since 2017, the Investigative Committee of the Russian Federation has organized searches for the bodies of Michael and Johnson, which had yielded no positive results by 2026. There are rumors and theories about Michael's rescue.

On 8 June 2009, four days short of the 91st anniversary of their deaths, both Michael and Johnson were officially rehabilitated. Russian State Prosecutors stated, "The analysis of the archive material shows that these individuals were subject to repression through arrest, exile and scrutiny ... without being charged of committing concrete class and social-related crimes."

Michael's son George, Count Brasov, died in a car crash shortly before his 21st birthday in 1931. Natalia died penniless in a Parisian charity hospital in 1952. His stepdaughter Natalia Mamontova married three times and wrote a book about her life entitled Step-Daughter of Imperial Russia, published in 1940.

== Regimental affiliations and commands ==
=== Russian ===
- Life-Guards Horse Artillery Brigade – lieutenant, 1898
- Life-Guards Her Imperial Majesty Empress Maria Feodorovna's Cuirassier Regiment – captain and squadron commander, 1902
- 17th Hussar Chernigovskii HIH Grand Princess Elizavet Feodorovna Hussars – colonel, commanding, 1910
- Life-Guards Her Imperial Majesty Empress Maria Feodorovna's Chevalier Guards Regiment – colonel, commanding, 1912
- Caucasian Native Mounted Division – major-general, commanding, 1914
- Second Cavalry Corps, Seventh Army – lieutenant-general, 1916
- Inspector-General of Cavalry, 1917

=== Foreign ===
- Ulanen-Regiment Kaiser Alexander III von Rußland (Westpreußisches) Nr.1, Prussian/Imperial German Army – colonel and regimental chief, December 1901, during an official visit to Berlin
- à la suite Imperial German Navy

== Honours ==
Russian orders

- Knight of St. Andrew, 12 October 1878
- Knight of St. Alexander Nevsky, 12 October 1878 (by statute of the Order of St. Andrew)
- Knight of the White Eagle, 12 October 1878 (by statute of the Order of St. Andrew)
- Knight of St. Anna, 1st Class, 12 October 1878 (by statute of the Order of St. Andrew)
- Knight of St. Stanislaus, 1st Class, 12 October 1878 (by statute of the Order of St. Andrew)
- Alexander III Commemorative Medal, 17 March 1896
- Nicholas II Coronation Medal, 26 May 1896
- Knight of St. Vladimir, 4th Class (civil), 22 November 1905; with Swords (for actions during the Brusilov Offensive, while in command of the 2nd Cavalry Corps), 1916
- Knight of St. George, 4th Class (for actions in the Carpathian Mountains, while in command of the Caucasian Native Cavalry Division), January 1915
- St. George Sword, 27 June 1915

Foreign orders

- Denmark:
  - Commemorative Medal for the Golden Wedding of King Christian IX and Queen Louise, 26 May 1892
  - Knight of the Elephant, 6 August 1897
  - Cross of Honour of the Order of the Dannebrog, 27 September 1899
- Emirate of Bukhara:
  - Order of the Golden Star of Bukhara, 1st Class, 1 January 1893
  - Order of the Crown of Bukhara, in Diamonds, 25 May 1896
  - Order of the Sun of Alexander, in Diamonds, 19 May 1898
- Mecklenburg: Grand Cross of the Wendish Crown, with Crown in Ore, 16 July 1894
- Grand Duchy of Hesse: Grand Cross of the Ludwig Order, 26 November 1894
- Principality of Montenegro: Grand Cross of the Order of Prince Danilo I, 17 May 1896
- Saxe-Weimar-Eisenach: Grand Cross of the White Falcon, 25 May 1896
- (Austrian Empire) (Kingdom of Hungary) Austria-Hungary: Grand Cross of the Royal Hungarian Order of St. Stephen, 15 May 1897
- Siam: Knight of the Order of the Royal House of Chakri, 4 July 1897
- Kingdom of Romania: Grand Cross of the Star of Romania, 8 July 1898
- (Saxe-Coburg and Gotha) (Duchy of Saxe-Altenburg) (Saxe-Meiningen) Ernestine duchies: Grand Cross of the Saxe-Ernestine House Order, 9 November 1899
- Empire of Japan: Grand Cordon of the Order of the Chrysanthemum, 8 September 1900
- Kingdom of Greece: Grand Cross of the Redeemer, 22 September 1900
- Kingdom of Italy: Knight of the Annunciation, 16 January 1901
- United Kingdom:
  - Honorary Knight Grand Cross of the Order of the Bath (civil), 15 February 1901
  - Stranger Knight Companion of the Garter, 15 July 1902
  - Commemorative Medal for the Coronation of King Edward VII, 19 August 1902
- France: Grand Cross of the Legion of Honour, 14 April 1901
- Kingdom of Portugal: Grand Cross of the Sash of the Two Orders, 27 April 1901
- Kingdom of Prussia:
  - Knight of the Black Eagle, 15 December 1901 – during an official visit to Berlin
  - Grand Commander's Cross of the Royal House Order of Hohenzollern, 23 May 1905
- Spain: Knight of the Golden Fleece, 26 December 1901
- Persian Empire: Order of the August Portrait, in Diamonds, 12 February 1902
- Oldenburg: Grand Cross of the Order of Duke Peter Friedrich Ludwig, with Golden Crown, 26 June 1902
- Norway:
  - Silver Commemorative Medal for the Coronation of King Haakon VII, 6 June 1906
  - Grand Cross of St. Olav, with Collar, 22 June 1906
- Sweden: Knight of the Seraphim, 12 May 1908
