= George Medal (Russian Empire) =

Medal of the Russian Empire

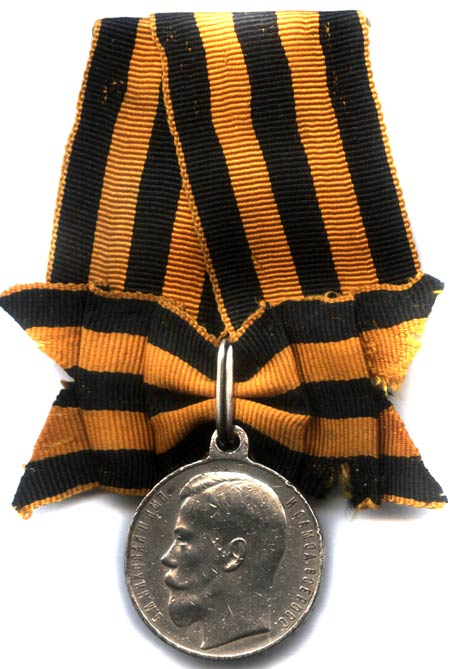
George Medal of III degree

The George Medal (Russian: Георгиевская медаль) was a medal of the Russian Empire issued for gallantry doring peace time and war time to lower ranks (privates and non-commissioned officers). It could also be issued to civilians for combat gallantry, as well as to medical personnel. It had four degrees. It was established on August 10, 1913.

The recipiend of all four classes was called "full George cavalier".

== See also ==
- Cross of St. George (Russia)
- Order of Saint George (Russia)
- Ribbon of Saint George
