= Peter Polovtsov =

Russian general (1874–1964)

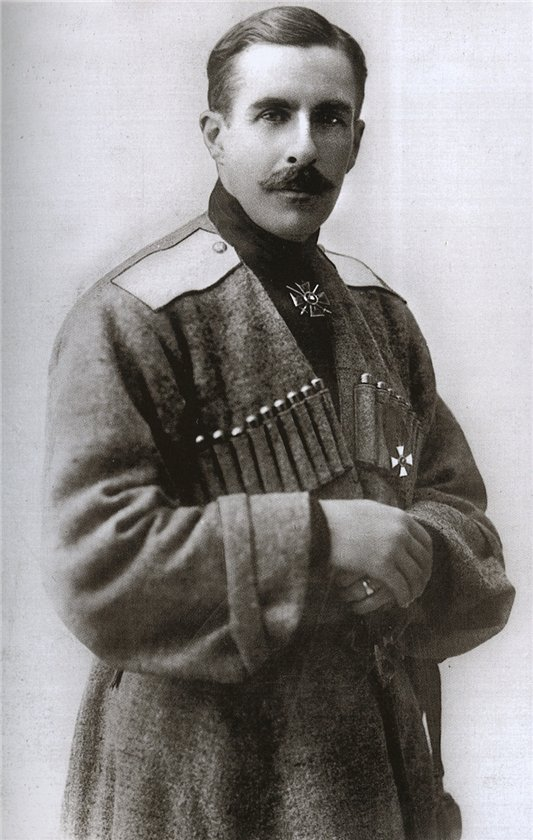
Peter Polovtsov

Peter Alexandrovich Polovtsov (Russian: Пётр Александрович Половцов; 11 July [O.S. 30 May] 1874 – 9 April 1964) was an Imperial Russian lieutenant general. He was the younger son of Alexander Polovtsov.

Polovtsov escaped from Soviet Russia in February 1918 with the aid of the British agents Ranald MacDonell and Edward Noel. He was provided with the passport of Reverend Jesse Yonan, an American missionary, and travelled in disguise from Tbilisi to Baku on the Transcaucasus Railway. They travelled on a train escorted by 10,000 armed troops of the Bolshevik Red Army. Noel's involvement in this came to light when he was held captive by the Jangalis in March 1918 and was used to pressurise MacDonell, then in Baku, to desist from trying to topple the Baku Commune.
