= Karim Khan Kangarlu =

Karim Khan Kangarli

Khan of Nakhichevan
- Reign: 1808 – 1809
- Predecessor: Kalb-Ali Khan Kangarlu
- Successor: Kalb-Ali Khan Kangarlu
- Reign: 1820 – 1822
- Predecessor: Nazar Khan Kangarli
- Successor: Huseyn Mirza
- Reign: 1823 – 1826
- Predecessor: Huseyn Mirza
- Successor: Muhammed Baghir Khan Kangarli
- Reign: 1826 – 1828
- Issue: Imam Qoli Khan, Telli-begum
- Father: Murtaza Ali or Ehsan Khan

Karim Khan Kangarli (Persian: كريم خان کنگرلو, Azerbaijani: Kərim xan Kəngərli) is the last khan of the Nakhichevan khanate, whose reign lasted intermittently from 1808 to 1827. After the abolition of the Nakhichevan khanate in 1828, Ehsan Khan was appointed the governor of Nakhichevan under the rule of the Russian Empire.

== Origin ==
Karim Khan was descended from the Kangarli tribe. From the end of the 18th century to the present day he is called the brother, then the nephew and sometimes the cousin of Kalb-Ali Khan. It is known from the Tiflis archive that the son of Karim Khan named Imam Qoli Khan married the granddaughter of Heydar Qoli Khan Telli-Begum. One of the khans Jafar Qoli Khan is sometimes also written as the native or cousin of Kalb-Ali Khan. From the very beginning, the customs of Kangarli confused Russian researchers, since the wife of the deceased brother was taken by another brother, who was signed as a relative or cousin. And although we do not have direct confirmation as it is written in the book “Khans of Nakhichevan in the Russian Empire”, indirect data from two sources suggest that Karim Khan was the brother of Kalb-Ali Khan.

== History ==
=== Rule ===
Karim Khan named in the document for 1810 as the khan of Nakhichevan he received an order from the son of the shah Abbas Mirza to invade Karabakh and 1.000 militias were sent to Nakhichevan to help him. In the first days of June of the same year, Karim Khan's detachment was already operating in Karabakh: it covered the roads to the village of Meghri and the commander of the Russian detachment located in the Chardakhly tract (the former Ganja khanate) general Nebolsin ordered colonel Pyotr Kotlyarevsky with a battalion of the 17th jäger regiment to occupy this important point.

Then Pyotr Kotlyarevsky captured Meghri with a night attack. The commander of the garrison occupying Meghri Pir Qoli Khan fled beyond the Aras river to Karadagh khanate and Karim khan to Nakhichevan.

As a result, the unfortunate Karim Khan was sent under guard to Tehran and the Nakhichevan khanate was transferred to the control of the eldest son of the deceased Kalb-Ali Khan Nazar Ali Khan. However, politics is changeable: in 1813, Karim khan again became the ruler of Nakhichevan, in 1816 — again Kalb-Ali Khan, and after 1820 — again the first, but for two years. In 1822, Hussein Mirza became khan and a year later in 1823 Karim Khan returned to power. Abbas Mirza again replaced him with Muhammad Bagher, but on the eve of the next Russo-Persian war, since Muhammad did not justify the Shah's trust, Karim khan was returned for the last time.

=== Relations with the Russian empire ===
In 1827, Karim Khan decided to punish his son-in-law Ehsan Khan Nakhichevansky, who helped the Russian troops. On July 17 of the same year, the Russian camp near AbbasAbad fortress received alarming news from Ehsan Khan that an attack was being prepared against him. Russian military leader Paskevich quickly responded to the request and on July 19 the Tiflis infantry regiment with a brigade of Cossacks and six horse artillery under the command of general Vadbolsky was already entering the city of Ordubad. On behalf of the Russian government, Ehsan Khan was appointed naib (deputy) of the Nakhichevan province and on July 21, the prince with his detachment set out from Ordubad back to Nakhichevan.

Not even two days had passed since the departure of the Russian detachment — Karim Khan with his armies again appeared in the vicinity of Ordubad and began to destroy the nearby villages. Ehsan Khan with 60 sarbazs (soldiers) arrived in time to help the inhabitants and Karim Khan was defeated. Failure, however, only embittered Karim Khan. Having received reinforcements from Abbas Mirza, he again appeared near Ordubad with a detachment of three thousand and this time they took the city.

Ehsan Khan locked himself in the citadel along with several relatives. They had no water and nevertheless, they decided to hold out to the end, and even managed to send a scout to general Paskevich with a request for immediate help. Finally, on August 1, the Russians approached Ordubad. Karim Khan not accepting the battle and withdrew behind the Aras river and Ehsan Khan was saved.

On August 7, near the village of Varanda, a Russian column of troops was cut off by Persian troops — two battalions of sarbazs and two thousand cavalry. Karim Khan, who led this detachment launched an offensive with his usual decisiveness and the Russians were blocked in the gorge. Fortunately, a company of the carabiniers approached from the direction of Nakhichevan. The Persians mistaking her for the vanguard of a large detachment and retreated.

After the events described, Karim Khan settled in Ordubad and continued to disturb the Russians with raids on their territory. In the end, all the estates of Karim Khan located on the territory of the Nakhichevan Khanate were confiscated to the Russian treasury. In the early 1830s, the khan tried to obtain their return from the Russian authorities; even his son came to Nakhichevan and Yerevan for this purpose, but to no avail.

However, Abbas Mirza provided Karim Khan and the Kangarli beys with him with several villages in the Maraga Khanate, where he moved after 1827.

== Family ==
In 1808, the families of the two brothers Kalb-Ali Khan and Karim Khan reconciled to a certain extent: the son of the Kalb-Ali Khan Ehsan Khan married the only daughter of Karim Khan Badyr-Nisah begum and the son of Karim Khan named Imam Qoli Khan married the daughter of Rahim Khan Telli-begum.

== See also ==
- Nakhichevan khanate
- Kalb-Ali Khan Kangarlu

== Sources ==
- Nagdaliev, Farkhad; Нагдалиев, Фархад. (2006). Khany Nakhichevanskie v Rossiĭskoĭ Imperii. Moskva: Novyĭ argument. ISBN 5-903224-01-6. OCLC 152052177.
