= Mahammadsadiq Khan Kalbalikhanov =

Naib of the Ordubad uezd

Naib of the Ordubad uezd

Personal details
- Parent: Sheikh Ali Khan (father)
- Tribe: Kangarlu

Mahammadsadiq Khan Kalbalikhanov (Azerb. Məmmədsadıq ağa Kəlbəlixanov, b. 1810 – d.1883) – was the naib of the Ordubad uezd and a Stabs-Kapitan (staff captain) in the Russian Empire. He was the son of Sheikh Ali Khan and the grandson of Kalb Ali, the Khan of Nakhichevan.

== Biography ==
In various documents, his name appears as Magomed-Sadig Bek, Mamed-Sadykh Hajji-Bek, or Mamed-Sadykh Bek Shikh-Ali-Bek-oghlu.

From 1827, he assisted his father in the administration of the town of Ordubad uezd. He took part in the Russo-Iranian War of 1826–1828 and was promoted to poruchik (lieutenant) on 12 August 1829. From around 1837, he was responsible for collecting taxes in Ordubad but did not receive remuneration from the state treasury. By order of the irregular troops in 1856 (no. 33), he was promoted to the rank of Stabs-Kapitan. He was awarded the silver medal commemorating the Russo-Iranian War of 1826–1828 and the medal of Emperor Nicholas I’s journey through the Caucasus in 1837.

Between 1865 and 1867, he served as a member of the Iravan Bey Commission for the Ordubad uezd. Kalbalikhanov owned land in the village of Yaycı, yielding an annual income of 60 silver rubles, as well as two gardens (valued at 100 and 300 rubles respectively). In 1858, his stone quarry in this village was leased to brothers M. Tuniyev and A. Tuniyev, residents of Nakhchivan.

=== Descendants ===
Staff Captain Mahammadsadiq Khan Kalbalikhanov had two sons—Lieutenant Mammad Khan Kalbalikhanov and Hajji Teymur Kalbalikhanov—as well as a daughter named Mina Beyim.

== Sources ==
- Нагдалиев, Фархад (2006). Ханы Нахичеванский в Российской империи / Научный ред. серии Э. Мамедли, оформление Ф. Нагдалиев. Новый Аргумент. ISBN 5-903224-01-6.
- Məmmədov, Dadaş (2022). Məmmədsadıq ağa Kəlbəlixanov.
