= Rahim Khan Kangarlu =

Khan of Nakhichevan from 1769 to 1770

Rahim Khan Kangarli

Khan of Nakhichevan
- Reign: 1769 — 1770
- Predecessor: Haji Khan Kangarli
- Successor: Ali Qoli Khan Kangarli
- Issue: Telli-begum
- Father: Heydar Qoli Khan

Rahim Khan Kangarli (Azerbaijani: رحیم خان کنگرلی) was the third khan of the Nakhichevan Khanate from 1769 to 1770.

== Life ==
The son of Heydar Qoli Khan from the Kangarli tribe, he replaced the previous Haji Khan Kangarli and remained in power for about a year. A year later, he was overthrown by Ali Qoli Khan Kangarli, who was supported by Karim Khan Zand.

Based on the documents in the Tbilisi archive, it is known that in 1829 he had a living daughter. This girl named Telli Begüm was married to Imamgulu Khan Kangarli, son of Karim Khan Kangarli. Karim Khan Kangarlu was the khan of Nakhchivan at the beginning of the 19th century.

== See also ==
- Nakhichevan khanate
- Kalb-Ali Khan Kangarlu

== Sources ==
- Talıbov, V. Y. (2005). Naxçıvan Ensiklopediyası. II cild (Təkmilləşdirilmiş və yenidən işlənmiş ikinci nəşr) [Nakhchivan Encyclopedia. Volume II (Improved and Revised Second Edition)] (in Azerbaijani). Naxçıvan: AMEA Naxçıvan bölməsi. ISBN 5-8066-1468-9.
