= Kangarli cavalry =

Military unit in the Imperial Russian Army

- Kəngərli süvariləri/Конница Кенгерли
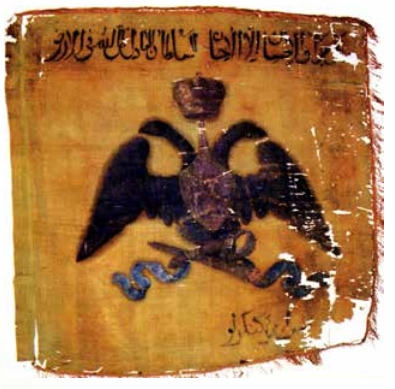
- Battle banner of Kangarli cavalary
- Active: 1828 – 1856
- Disbanded: 1856
- Country: Russian Empire
- Branch: Caucasian corpus
- Type: Cavalary
- Garrison/HQ: Erivan Governorate
- Engagements: Russo-Turkish War (1828–1829), Crimean War Caucasian front (1853–1856)

Commanders
- Notable commanders: Ehsan Khan Nakhichevansky, Farajulla bey

Kangarli cavalry (Azerbaijani: Kəngərli süvariləri; Russian: Конница Кенгерли) was an army unit in the Russian army in 1828–1856. They participated in the Russian-Ottoman war under the leadership of Ehsan Khan from Nakhchivan.

Beys used epaulettes, viceroys, and adjutants to command an army unit.

== History ==
=== Early ===
Kangarlis are one of the Turkic tribes that have existed since early times. They were also active during the Safavid period and formed a branch of Ustaj, one of the main Qizilbash tribes. Currently, their heirs live in the Iranian Azerbaijan and Qom-Varamin regions of Iran. The Khans of Nakhchivan belonged to this tribe.

In 1787, Kalbali Khan, who relied on cavalry from the Kangarli tribe, came to power as a result of a palace coup. After a short time, he subjugated the nomadic tribes and clans as Khan of Nakhchivan and established full power.

=== Participation in Russian-Ottoman wars ===
The Kangarli Cavalry, part of the Russian Imperial Army, was created in 1828 during the Russo-Turkish War of 1828–1829. It was commanded by Colonel Ehsan Khan. The uniform of the Kangarli cavalry consisted of a shirt, a cloth or felt (for winter) dark blue stand-up collar, a braided beshmet, a high-pointed hat (for winter) made as a headdress, and a green cloth eight-pointed star on it. Although boots were used in war or travel situations, in peacetime, dolamas were used. Grooms wore epaulettes, and their assistants, viceroys and lawyers, were distinguished from soldiers and nökers. Nökers (Note: One of the warrior classes that existed in Turko-Mongol societies in the Middle Ages is meant. Translated from Mongolian, it means "companion", "warrior", "servant", "helper" and "slave". Zerrin Günal: İslam Ansiklopedisi: Nöker. Istanbul. 2007) had a special mark on their collars. In winter, everyone used yapinji. Rifles, pistols and daggers were the weapons.

With the consultation of the elders of the Kangarli tribe of Nakhchivan, two hundred Kangarli cavalrymen were sent to help General Parkechiv. The cavalry was commanded by Farajulla Bey, the son of Kor Khan, the captain of the Russian army. His assistant was captain Zeynalabdin Soltan, son of Haji Isa Soltan, one of the Kangarli beys. Mehdi Agha, son of Kalbali Khan, was also on the list of centurions. In general, all Kangarli gentlemen who could hold a weapon were serving in this group.

During the entire campaign of 1829, the Kangarli Cavalry mainly operated as part of the consolidated Cossack regiment and participated in the Oltu expedition of Lieutenant Colonel Prince M. Z. Argutinsky-Dolgorukin's detachment as an independent unit only on September 18–20. The siege of the Oltu fortress and its subsequent firing led to the surrender of the fortress garrison. Kangarli cavalrymen, who were in the vanguard of the detachment, became more prominent in the battle of Milli-Duz. All Transcaucasia Muslim cavalry regiments, including the Kangarli cavalry, were awarded with commemorative flags on October 26, 1830, for their distinction in the battles of 1829. According to the order of Nicholas I, Kangarli cavalrymen were given an honorary flag for their bravery, the State Coat of Arms and the monogram of Nicholas I were depicted on its green fabric. There is a flag in History Museum of Azerbaijan belonging to a detachment of the Kangarli cavalry. Researches show that the flag of the Kangarli Cavalry was transported to the palace of Ehsan Khan under the personal leadership of the Caucasus Governor - Field Marshal Prince Mikhail Semenovich Vorontsov (1782-1856).

=== Later ===
In the 1830s, the 350 cavalry union was kept ready for war and 8,400 rubles were collected from the Nakhchivan khanate for the detention of the army. Kangaris were the only community in the Caucasus Corps, which is permanently served in the military. In 1837, hundreds of Kangarli cavalrymen led by Farajulla bey, brother of Ehsan Khan, arrested Molla Mahammad Sadigh, who were talking about the end of the world. On October 5, 1837, during the journey to Caucasus, the Russian Emperor – Nicholas I saw the Kangarli cavalary and called them "incomparable". Historian Farhad Nagdaliyev states that after Nicholas seeing the excellence of Kangarli cavalary, he ordered formation of a Muslim detachment out of noble families for his convoy. From the story of Nicholas written by Alexander von Benckendorff:

When I went down to the gorge, I saw the unparalled Kangarli cavalrymen with beautiful horses and in uniform lined in front of me in a ready position. The leader, Ehsan Khan came to me in a hurry, and reported like an officer of our regual army. I went till famous Echmiadzin monastery with them. Armenian patriach Yohannes met me on horse in front of monastery. When I left monastery I looked at Kangarli cavalrymen who were escorting me on my way to Iravan.

In 1850, the Kangarli cavalry group, who was previously subordinate to the military management, began to carry out police, border and customs–quarantine guardians in Nakhichvan uyezd. During the Crimean War, three hundred Kangarli Cavalry were fighting as part of Iravan detachment under the command of Lieutenant-General Baron K.K Wrangel. During the entire campaign of 1854, horsemen were constantly in the forefront, performing reconnaissance and patrol duties.

With the end of military activity, on August 30, 1856, the Kangarli Cavalry Union was dissolved.

== Flag ==
In the official letter dated April 23, 1845, the official appeal of Ehsan Khan was reflected. The next day, with letter number 44, the head of the region was informed that Prince Gagarin was entrusted with the transfer of the honorary flag kept in the administrative center to the palace of Ehsan Khan. Gagarin was on an official visit to Iran at that time. In the last sentence of the letter, it was written that "give me my letter and gift and show my respect to Ehsan Khan". The letter No. 498 dated April 25 of the commander-in-chief of the Russian troops in the Caucasus to the aforementioned guard colonel Prince Gagarin notes:

The flag of honor presented to the Kangarli tribe by the most merciful ruler. Currently, it is kept in the Nakhchivan district administration. Major General Ehsan Khan, the father of the march of Muslim troops, asks to deliver this flag to his palace. Therefore, as soon as you return from Iran, solemnly deliver this flag to the palace of Ehsan Khan. Notify me once the ceremony is completed.

After the ceremonial delivery of the flag to the palace of Ehsan Khan, the latter wrote a letter of thanks to M.S. Vorontsov, the governor of the Caucasus, which is kept among the documents. The letter expresses gratitude for the trust shown to him, for the gifts and for allowing the Kangarli cavalry flag to be kept in his palace. This letter was written on June 1, 1845, in Nakhchivan and confirmed by the personal seal and signature of Ehsan Khan.

During the Crimean War in June 1854, II Kalbali Kangarli showed bravery during the battles for Chingil Hill, for which he was awarded the 4th degree Order of George. In the same year, Emperor Nicholas I sent a battle flag to Kalbali Khan. This square banner measuring 145x120 cm is blue in color, made of silk fabric, with images and inscriptions on the front and back sides.

The battle and honor flags of the Kangarli Cavalry are stored in the "New and Modern History" fund of the museum in Baku. The battle flag of the Kangarli cavalry differs from the flags of other Muslim cavalry regiments of the Russian army by the green color of the canvas and some elements. The rectangular silk flag measures 134x128 cm and features a somewhat schematic representation of an eagle with a gray shield on its chest and cannonballs in its claws. The flagpole is black. Unlike the flags of other Muslim regiments, here in Arabic "Goodness is rewarded with goodness". The just sultan is the shadow of God on earth. The inscription "Al-Murad Kangarli" is not on the ribbon, but directly on the flag itself. Let's note that this Murad is the great-grandfather of Nakhchivan Khan, Kalbala I. It can be concluded that most of the symbolical elements of this flag belong to the Kangarli tribe. The Honorary Flag of Kangarli's coup is green, and the dimensions are made of 158x140 cm, double silk fabric. The center is given a two-headed eagle description of the golden wreath in a white background. The upper end yellow, lower and grasses are the same as the other regiment's honor placards. This is a copy of the flag that moved to the Palace of Ehsan Khan. According to Russian historian Oleg Kuznetsov, the Honorary Flag is kept in the St. Petersburg Museum.

== Sources ==
- Ахмедов, Э. М. (1989). А.К. Бакиханов: эпоха, жизнь, деятельность [A.K. Bakikhanov: times, life, works] (in Russian). Б.: Элм.
- Исмаилов, Э. Э. (2005). Георгиевские кавалеры-азербайджанцы (in Russian). Moscow: Герои отечества.
- Сулейманов, Ф. И. (1962). О знаменах азербайджанских полков, участвовавших в русско-турецкой войне 1828-1829 гг (in Russian). Baku: Материалы по истории Азербайджана.
- Гордин, Я. А. (2017). Николай I глазами современников (in Russian). St. Petersburg: Пальмира.
- Гулиев, М. (11 January 2015). Знамя Конницы кенгерли [Kangerli Cavalry Banner]. Каспий (in Russian).
- Нагдалиев, Ф. Ф. (2006). Ханы Нахичеванские в Российской империи. Moscow: Новый Аргумент. ISBN 5-903224-01-6.
- Oberling, Pierre (2010). London and New York: Routledge & Kegan Paul. Encyclopædia Iranica. ISBN 978-1-934283-28-8.
- Bournoutian, George (2021). From the Kur to the Aras: A Military History of Russia's Move into the South Caucasus and the First Russo-Iranian War, 1801-1813. Brill.
