= Ali Qoli Khan Kangarlu =

Ali Qoli Khan Kangarli

Khan of Nakhichevan
- Reign: 1770 — 1773
- Predecessor: Rahim Khan Kangarli
- Successor: Vali Qoli Khan Kangarli

Ali Qoli Khan Kangarli (Azerbaijani: علی قلی خان کنگرلی) was the 4th khan of the Nakhichevan Khanate, who was succeeded Rahim Khan and held office from 1770 to 1773.

== Life ==
He came from the Kangarli tribe, the brother of the first khan of Nakhichevan - Heydar Qoli Khan. Ali Qoli Khan came to power in Nakhichevan in 1770 with the help of Karim Khan Zand, but three years later he was overthrown by Vali Qoli Khan Kangarli.

== Sources ==
- V. Y. Talıbov. Naxçıvan Ensiklopediyası. II cild (Təkmilləşdirilmiş və yenidən işlənmiş ikinci nəşr). Naxçıvan: AMEA Naxçıvan bölməsi.
