= Gonchabegüm Nakhchivanski =

Azerbaijani poet

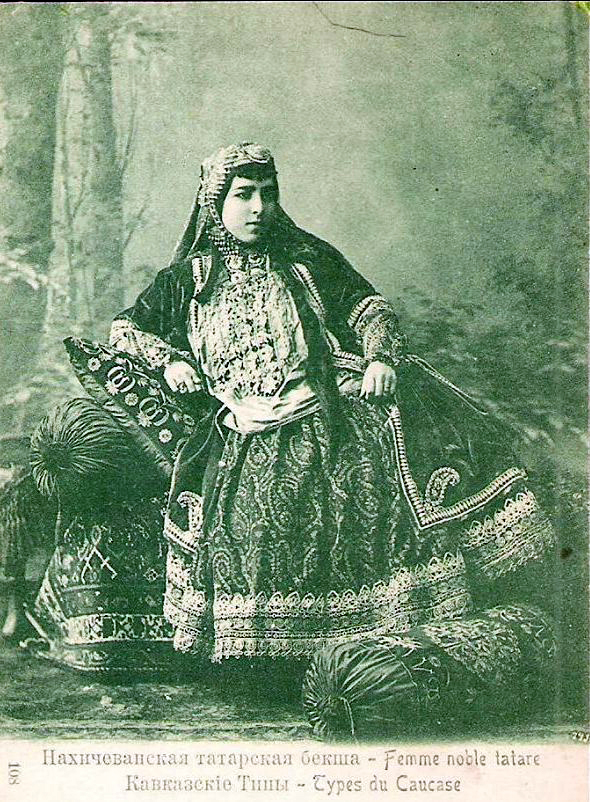
- Born: Qönçəbəyim Ehsan xan qızı Naxçıvanski; 1827; Nakhchivan, Nakhchivan Khanate
- Died: Unknown
- Occupation: Poet

Gonchabegüm Nakhchivanski (Azerbaijani: Qönçəbəyim Naxçıvanski; born 1827, Nakhchivan, Nakhchivan Khanate, - died ?, Russian Empire) was an Azerbaijani poet. She was the daughter of the last Nakhichevan Khan Ehsan Khan Nakhichevansky.

== Life ==
She was born in 1827 in Nakhchivan. In 1837 she entered the Russian school that opened in the city, where she learned Russian and Persian. She was also a member of the poetic meeting "Goncha i-Ulfat". She wrote her own lyrical poems under the pseudonym "Begüm". According to her own words, she wrote some parts of the parts of Şhahzade Ibrahim dastan. In 1845, the Georgian poet N. M. Baratashvili, who met with Ehsan Khan, also met with Nakhchivanski. He was interested in her creative activity and dedicated his work “Song of Gonchabegüm ” to her. He also translated one of her poems into the Georgian alphabet and sent it to Tbilisi for translation. To perform this poem at solemn events, he advised to turn to the khanende singers Sattar and Jafar of Sheki. According to I.K. Enikolopov, Sattar performed one of her poems translated by Baratashvili in Georgian language.

== Family ==
After the dissolution of the khanate, the khans of Nakhichevan took the Russified surname Nakhchivanski, and the men of its family traditionally joined the Russian military service. Two brothers of Gonchabegüm Nakhchivanski - Ismail khan and Kalbali khan - were generals in the Russian army and were awarded orders of Saint-George IV degree for their actions in battle.

== See also ==
- Fatma Khanum Kamina
