= Jafar Khan (disambiguation) =

Jafar Khan or Jafar Khan Zand, was the seventh shah (king) of the Zand dynasty from 1785 to 1789.

Jafar Khan may also refer to:

- Jafar Khan, grand vizier (r. 1657–1658 & 1663–1670) of the Mughal emperor Aurangzeb
- Jafar Khan (Gujarat Sultanate), son of Ahmad Shah I, sultan of Gujarat Sultanate
- Jafar Khan, also known as Mir Jafar, 18th-century Nawab of Bengal
- Siraj-ud-Daulah (Mir Syed Jafar Ali Khan Mirza Muhammad Siraj-ud-Daulah), last independent Nawab of Bengal from 1756 to 1757
- Jafar Khan Jamali (1911–1967), Pakistani politician and tribal chief
- Jafar Qoli Khan, cousin and successor of Abbas Qoli Khan Kangarli of the Nakhichevan Khanate
- Jafar Khan Is Back from the West (1985) Iranian comedy-drama film

== See also ==
- Jafarkhan, Kurdistan, or Ja‘far Khānī, a village in Khvor Khvoreh Rural District, Ziviyeh District, Saqqez County, Kurdistan Province, Iran
- Deh-e Mir Jafar Khan, a village in Jahanabad Rural District, in the Central District of Hirmand County, Sistan and Baluchestan Province, Iran
