= Haji Khan Kangarlu =

Khan of Nakhichevan from 1764 to 1769

Haji Khan Kangarli

Khan of Nakhichevan
- Reign: 1764–1769
- Predecessor: Heydar Qoli Khan Kangarli
- Successor: Rahim Khan Kangarli

Haji Khan Kangarli (Persian: حاجی خان کنگرلی, Azerbaijani: Hacı xan Kəngərli; r. 1765–1769) was the second khan of the Nakhichevan Khanate from the Kangarli tribe, who succeeded Heydar Qoli Khan.

During his reign, the Nakhichevan Khanate weakened, he accepted dependence on Karim Khan Zand, the Shah of Iran, who invited him to Shiraz and took him prisoner for a petty crime. Rahim Khan began to rule in this khanate.

== See also ==
- Karim Khan Zand
- Heydar Qoli Khan
