= General Nakhchivanski =

General Nakhchivanski may refer to:

- Huseyn Khan Nakhchivanski (1863–1919), Imperial Russian Army cavalry general
- Ismail Khan Nakhchivanski (1819–1909), Imperial Russian Army cavalry general
- Jamshid Nakhchivanski (1895–1938), Soviet Army Combrig (equivalent to brigadier general)
- Kelbali Khan Nakhchivanski (1824–1883), Imperial Russian Army cavalry general
