= Vali Qoli Khan Kangarlu =

Khan of Nakhichevan from 1773 to 1780

Vali Qoli Khan Kangarli

Khan of Nakhichevan
- Reign: 1773–1780
- Predecessor: Ali Qoli Khan Kangarli
- Successor: Abbas Qoli Khan Kangarli

Vali Qoli Khan Kangarli (Azerbaijani: ولی قلی خان کنگرلی) was the 5th khan of the Nakhichevan Khanate who was succeeded by Abbas Qoli Khan Kangarli and held office from 1773 to 1780/1781.

== Life ==
In 1773, Valigulu Khan, with the help of Karim Khan Zand, ruler of the Zand dynasty, overthrew Ali Qoli Khan Kangarli and became the Khan of Nakhchivan. However, after the assassination of Karim Khan Zand in 1779, he could not remain in power. He was overthrown in 1780 by Abbas Qoli Khan Kangarli, who received help from neighboring khanates (with the support of Huseyn-Ali Khan of Erivan, Heraclius II of Georgia and Ibrahim Khalil Khan of Karabakh).
