= Maksud Alikhanov-Avarsky =

Russian Lieutenant-General (1846–1907)

- ГӀалиханил Макъсуд
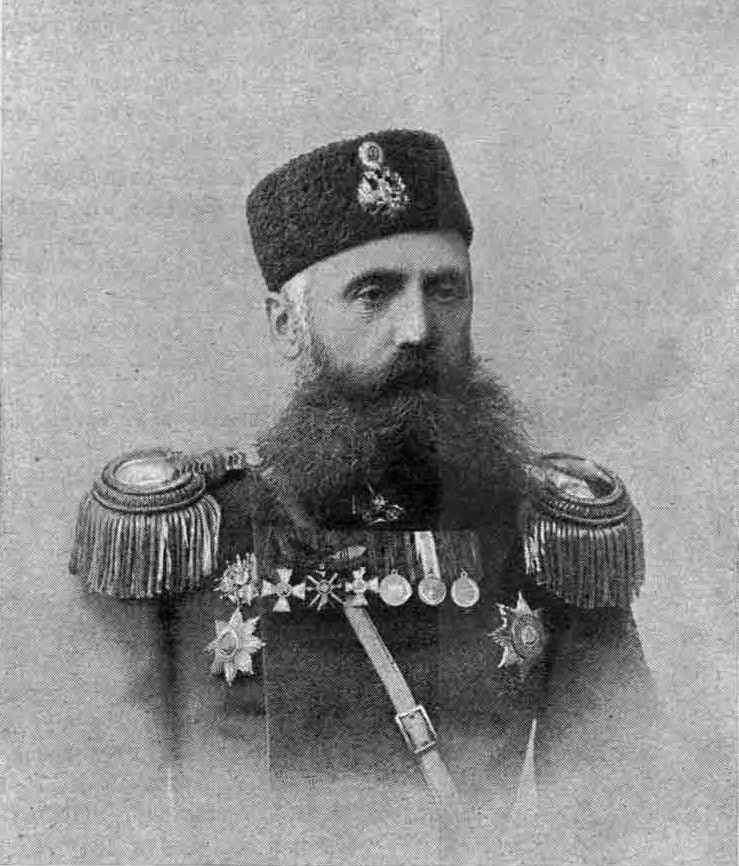
- Alikhanov-Avarsky in 1907

Acting Governor-General of the Kutais Governorate
- In office January 1906 – 1907
- Monarch: Nicholas II
- Preceded by: Alexei Smagin
- Succeeded by: Adam Slavachinsky

Acting Governor of the Tiflis Governorate
- In office December 1905 – January 1906
- Monarch: Nicholas II
- Preceded by: Ivan Nikolayevich Svechin
- Succeeded by: Paul Bernhard Demetrius Rausch von Traubenberg

Head of the Merv District, Transcaspian Oblast
- In office 1884–1890
- Monarch: Alexander III
- Preceded by: Position established
- Succeeded by: Georgy Arandarenko

Personal details
- Born: 23 November 1846 Khunzakh, Dagestan Oblast, Russian Empire
- Died: 3 July 1907 (aged 60) Alexandropol, Erivan Governorate, Russian Empire
- Spouse: Zarin-Taj Begum Nakhchivanskaya
- Relations: Kelbali Khan Nakhchivanski (father-in-law)
- Children: 2
- Education: Second Konstantinovsky Military School
- Occupation: Military officer, administrator, military and travel writer
- Military career
- Allegiance: Russian Empire
- Branch: Imperial Russian Army
- Service years: 1864–1877, 1877–1907
- Rank: Lieutenant-General
- Unit: Cavalry
- Commands: 2nd Caucasian Cossack Division (1907)
- Conflicts: Khivan campaign of 1873; Russo-Turkish War; Battle of Deve-boyun; Akhal Teke Expedition; First Battle of Geok Tepe; Panjdeh incident; Boxer Rebellion
- Awards: Order of St. George, 4th class (1885); Cross of St. George, 4th class (1877); Order of St. Vladimir, 4th and 3rd class (1872, 1899); Order of St. Anna, 2nd and 1st class (1888, 1906); Order of St. Stanislaus, 2nd and 1st class (1874, 1904); Order of the Lion and the Sun (Persia), 3rd, 2nd and 1st class (1884, 1900, 1902); Bukharan Order of the Golden Star, 2nd class (1895)

Maksud Alikhanov-Avarsky (Russian: Максуд Алиханов-Аварский; in some documents his name is given as Alexander Mikhailovich; 23 November 1846 – 3 July 1907) was a Russian military officer, administrator and writer of Avar origin who served the Russian Empire in Central Asia and the Caucasus. He rose to Lieutenant-General (22 April 1907), was the first head of the Merv district after its annexation in 1884, and later served as acting governor of Tiflis and acting governor-general of the Kutais Governorate. He was assassinated in Alexandropol in 1907.

== Early life ==
Alikhanov-Avarsky was born on 23 November (O.S.) 1846 in the village of Khunzakh in Dagestan, into the Avar family of Alikhan Huseynov, an officer in the Russian army, and his wife Tutun. He was the elder brother of Kaitmaz Alikhanov. As a child he was held hostage by Imam Shamil; after a ransom was paid he was placed in the Second Tiflis Noble Gymnasium.

In 1862 he entered the Second Konstantinovsky Military School, and in 1864 was commissioned as a cornet in the Sumy Hussar Regiment.

== Military career ==
Alikhanov-Avarsky was promoted lieutenant on 1 February 1868 and staff captain of cavalry in 1869. From 1871, holding the rank of captain of cavalry, he served as adjutant to Prince Ivan Loris-Melikov, the military commander of the Dagestan Oblast. In 1873 he was attached for special assignments to the staff of Grand Duke Michael Nikolayevich, commander-in-chief of the Caucasian Army. In the same year he took part in the Khivan campaign of 1873 with the Mangyshlak detachment and was wounded; after recovering he was posted to Krasnovodsk.

In the summer of 1875 Alikhanov-Avarsky quarrelled with a fellow officer, and both men were court-martialled. A year later he was reduced to the ranks and stripped of all his decorations, the sentence citing an attempt on an officer's life committed in anger.

In September 1877 he was assigned as a private to the 15th Pereyaslavsky Dragoon Regiment, which served with the Erivan detachment on the Caucasian front of the Russo-Turkish War. For distinction at the Battle of Deve Boyun he received the Cross of St. George, 4th class. The following year he published his first article, a study of the Deve Boyun position, in the Engineering Journal.

In 1879 Alikhanov-Avarsky was seconded to the Transcaspian Oblast and served in General Lomakin's detachment during the Akhal Teke Expedition, taking part in the unsuccessful first assault on Geok Tepe; despite the failure of the attack he was promoted to ensign. In 1882 he travelled to Merv under the cover of a merchant caravan and held secret talks with Turkmen elders. In 1883 he reconnoitred Persian Khorasan with a small detachment and, on instructions from the Caucasus Viceroy, met Naser al-Din Shah to discuss border questions.

A second, official mission to Merv the following year led to the annexation of the Merv oasis by the Russian Empire, and Alikhanov-Avarsky was appointed the first head of the Merv district of the Transcaspian Oblast. The rank of major and the decorations he had lost by sentence of the court were restored to him, and on 6 May 1884 he was reappointed lieutenant colonel.

At the Battle of Kushka on 18 March 1885, in which General Komarov's forces clashed with Afghan troops, Alikhanov-Avarsky commanded three sotnias of the Caucasian Cossack Regiment together with a sotnia of the temporary Merv militia. For his conduct in the action he was awarded the Order of St. George, 4th class, on 28 December 1885.

From 16 January 1890 he was attached to the forces of the Caucasus Military District, remaining on the rolls of the army infantry. He was promoted colonel on 6 October 1898. In 1900 he took part in the Russian campaign in China during the Boxer Rebellion, and on 14 October 1901 was promoted major general.

== Administration in the Caucasus ==
In the summer of 1905 Alikhanov-Avarsky was sent to pacify the Erivan Governorate during the Armenian–Tatar clashes. Contemporary Russian newspapers accused him of openly favouring the Muslim (Tatar) side, and in particular the Khans of Nakhchivan, the family of his wife, during the violence against Armenians. His administration in the Caucasus was contentious and was described in contemporary accounts as harshly repressive.

In December 1905 he was appointed acting governor of Tiflis, and from January 1906 acting governor-general of the Kutais Governorate. In 1906 he led the military operation that suppressed the Gurian Republic, restoring imperial authority within a few weeks by repressive means. He became a particular target of revolutionary organisations: eight attempts were made on his life, and although he was wounded by a bomb he refused to resign.

After recovering, in early 1907 he took command of the 2nd Caucasian Cossack Division, and on 22 April 1907 was confirmed in the post with promotion to lieutenant-general.

== Assassination ==
On 3 July 1907 Alikhanov-Avarsky was killed in Alexandropol by Drastamat Kanayan, a member of the Armenian Revolutionary Federation, assisted by Martiros Charkhchyan. The attack was carried out in revenge for his role in the Armenian–Tatar massacres.

As he was returning from a gathering of the Kabardian Regiment, two bombs were thrown into his carriage on Bebutovskaya Street. Also in the carriage were his son and the wife and daughter of General Nikolai Ivanovich Glebov, commander of the 20th Infantry Division. Alikhanov-Avarsky, Glebov's wife and the coachman were killed in the explosions.

== Family ==
Alikhanov-Avarsky was married to Zarin-Taj Begum Nakhchivanskaya, a daughter of Major General Kelbali Khan Nakhchivanski. The couple had two sons, Adil-Khan and Hafiz-Khan.

== Ranks ==
- Cornet — 23 May 1864
- Lieutenant — 1 February 1868
- Staff captain of cavalry — 1869
- Captain of cavalry — 1 September 1871
- Major — 8 November 1873
- Reduced to the ranks — 30 July 1877
- Ensign — 24 August 1880
- Lieutenant — 27 July 1882
- Staff captain of cavalry — 13 July 1883
- Rank of major restored — 23 February 1884
- Lieutenant colonel — 6 May 1884
- Colonel — 6 October 1898
- Major general — 14 October 1901
- Lieutenant-general — 22 April 1907

== Awards ==
=== Russian ===
- Order of St. Vladimir, 4th class with swords and bow (1872)
- Order of St. Stanislaus, 2nd class with swords (1874)
- Cross of St. George, 4th class (1877)
- Order of St. George, 4th class (28 December 1885)
- Order of St. Anna, 2nd class (1888)
- Order of St. Vladimir, 3rd class (1899)
- Order of St. Stanislaus, 1st class (1904)
- Order of St. Anna, 1st class (1906)

=== Foreign ===
- Order of the Lion and the Sun (Persia), 3rd class (1884), 2nd class (1900), 1st class (1902)
- Bukharan Order of the Golden Star, 2nd class (1895)

== Selected works ==
- The Merv Oasis and the Roads Leading to It. St Petersburg, 1883.
- Visiting the Shah: Essays on Persia. Tiflis, 1898.
- Tarikhi Derbend-Nameh. Tiflis, 1898.
- The Campaign in Khiva (of the Caucasian Detachments): Steppe and Oasis. St Petersburg, 1899.
- Numerous illustrations, articles and reports in periodicals.

== Bibliography ==
- Ivanov, R. N. (2003). General Maksud Alikhanov: Triumph and Tragedy (in Russian). Makhachkala: Epoch Publishing House. p. 645.
- The Battle of Kushka and its 25th Anniversary, 18/III 1885 – 18/III 1910 (in Russian). St Petersburg. 1910.
- Бондаренко И. И., Климов Д. В. Жертвы политического террора в России (1901—1912) // Терроризм в России в начале XX в. (Исторический вестник. — Т. 2 [149]. — Декабрь 2012). — С. 190—215.
- Список генералам по старшинству. Составлен по 1 июля 1906 года. — СПб., 1906.
