= Ismail Khan Nakhchivanski =

Russian Imperial Army officer

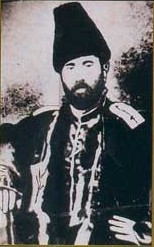
- Born: 5 January 1819; Nakhchivan Khanate
- Died: February 1909 (aged 90); Nakhchivan City, Erivan Governorate
- Military career
- Allegiance: (Russia) Russian Empire
- Branch: Cavalry
- Service years: 1839–1908
- Rank: General of the Cavalry
- Commands: "Kengerly Cavalry" "Erivan Bey Regiment" "Erivan Cavalry Irregular Regiment"
- Conflicts: Crimean War; Russo-Turkish War
- Awards: 2nd Class Ode of Saint Stanislaus 3rd Class Ode of Saint Stanislaus 3rd Class Order of Saint Vladimir 4th Class Order of Saint Vladimir 2nd Class Order of Saint Vladimir 1st Class Order of Saint Anne 4th Class Order of St. George 1st Class Order of the Lion and the Sun 2nd Class Order of the Lion and the Sun 3rd Class Order of the Lion and the Sun

Ismail Khan Ehsan Khan oghlu Nakhchivanski (Azerbaijani: İsmayıl xan Ehsan xan oğlu Naxçıvanski; 5 January 1819 – 10 February 1909) was an Azerbaijani Cavalry General in Imperial Russian Army. He was the son of Ehsan Khan Nakhichevansky and uncle of Huseyn Khan Nakhchivanski. His brother Kelbali Khan Nakhchivanski was also Cavalry General in the Russian Imperial Army.

== The beginning of the military service ==
Ismail Khan Nakhchivanski was born on 5 January 1819 in the family of the ruler of Nakhichevan, Ehsan Khan (1789–1846). He received his primary education at the Tiflis Noble Gymnasium. From a young age, under the commandment of his father, he served in the "Kengerly Cavalry". In 1837, the "Kengerly Cavalry", as an honorary convoy, accompanied the Emperor Nicholas I, who arrived to the Caucasus. The honorary convoy also included the 18-year-old Ismail Khan. Among other escorts, he was awarded by the emperor a silver medal on the ribbon of the St. Vladimir Order. Ismail Khan began his service in the Russian Imperial Army on 1 May 1839 in Warsaw in the Transcaucasian Muslim Horse Regiment naibom (as assistant commander of a Sotnia). "For distinction in service" during the inspections and manoeuvres near Warsaw in 1840, he was promoted to Praporshchik on 28 October 1840. On 27 December 1841, Ismail Khan was promoted to lieutenant, and on 3 March 1845, the Stabskapitän Ismail Khan was appointed by the highest order to be in the army cavalry at the Russian Caucasus Forces. On 19 September 1847, he was appointed head of the Kengerly Cavalry. For distinction in service on 5 February 1853, he was promoted to captain.

== Crimean War ==
On 16 October 1853, the Crimean War began. On 10 November, Ismail Khan was appointed head of the Erivan Bek squad, which became part of the Erivan detachment of the Russian troops. From 1 May to 5 December 1854, he was assistant commander of the 4th Muslim Cavalry Regiment. From 22 April to 5 July he took part in the clashes in the region of Igdyr, Caravanserai, Orgov. On 17 July, as part of the Erivan detachment, under the general commandment of the Lieutenant General Baron Karl Karlovich Wrangel, he participated in the defeat of the 12 thousand corps of Selim Pasha on the Chingil Heights and the subsequent occupation of Bayazet on 19 July. Later he took part in the actions of the area Abas-gel, Mysun, Dutakh, Diadin, Kara-kilis, Alashkert (Toprak-kala), etc. For military merits, on 4 August 1855, he was transferred to the Cossack Life Guards. On 13 October 1856, he was awarded the Order of Saint Stanislaus of the 3rd degree with swords.

== Interwar period ==
On 3 April 1860, Ismail Khan was promoted to colonel. On 22 September 1867, the Colonel Ismail Khan was awarded the Order of Saint Vladimir of the 4th degree with a bow by the highest order for seniority in the officer ranks of 25 years of the guard. In January 1868, by the Shakh of Qajar dynasty, he was awarded the Order of the Lion and the Sun of the 2nd degree with a star. On 28 September 1872, "for distinction in service", he was awarded the Order of St. Stanislaus of the 2nd degree with the imperial crown.

== Bayazet seat ==
Ismail Khan Nakhchivanski became famous during the Russo-Turkish War (1877–1878). On 17 April 1877, the troops of the Erivan detachment under the general commandment of the Lieutenant General Arshak Ter-Gukasov crossed the Russian-Turkish border and reached Bayazet through the Chingil Pass. The Turks, having learned about the approach of large forces of the Russian troops, left the fortress. On 18 April, Bayazet was occupied by a small detachment led by the Lieutenant Colonel A. Kovalevsky, the commander of the 2nd battalion of the 74th Stavropol Infantry Regiment of the 19th Infantry Division. Kovalevsky was appointed commander of the Bayazet District. The main forces of the Erivan detachment continued to move deep into the enemy's territory. On 24 May, the Lieutenant Colonel Kovalevsky, as commander of the district troops, was replaced by the Lieutenant Colonel G. Patsevich, who arrived in Bayazet with replenishment from two companies of the 73rd Crimean Infantry Regiment of the same division. The Captain F. E. Stokvich was appointed the commandant of the fortress.

On 5 May 1877, by the order of the commander-in-chief of the Caucasian Army, the Grand Duke Michael Nikolaevich of Russia, the Colonel Ismail Khan was appointed commander of the newly formed Erivan Equestrian Irregular Regiment. The regiment became part of the cavalry irregular brigade of the Major General Kelbali Khan Nakhchivanski, the younger brother of Ismail Khan. The brigade had the task of covering the state border from an eventual invasion of the enemy into the territory of the Erivan province.

On 4 June, the Major General Kelbali Khan, having received the information from the Lieutenant Colonel Patsevich about the movement of the Turks from Van to Bayazet, turned to the head of the Erivan detachment, the General Tergukasov, for permission to send reinforcements to Bayazet's garrison, but he was refused. The next day Patsevich informed Kelbali Khan that the Turkish cavalry was reconnoitring the roads to Bayazet, and asked for help. Kelbali Khan again appealed to the General Ter-Gukasov for permission and this time the corresponding order was received. On the same day, 5 June, the General Kelbali Khan sent 300 of the Erivan Irregular Equestrian Regiment headed by Ismail Khan to Bayazet. On 6 June, the Lieutenant Colonel Patsevich decided to conduct reconnaissance, and set out with two companies of infantry under the commandment of the Lieutenant Colonel Kovalevsky and one hundred Cossacks from the fortress to Van. Faced with many times superior enemy troops, Patsevich's detachment, suffering serious losses, began to retreat to the fortress. The Lieutenant Colonel Kovalevsky was seriously wounded and died on a stretcher. A critical situation has arisen. At that moment, hundreds of the Erivan irregular cavalry regiment, led by Ismail Khan approached Bayazet after many hours of march. With his fighters, Ismail Khan entered into an unequal battle with the superior forces of the enemy.

From the report of the commandant of Bayazet, the captain F. E Shtokvich, to His Imperial Highness, the Commander-in-Chief of the Caucasian Army, the Grand Duke Mikhail Nikolaevich, dated with 4 July 1877, No. 116:

The enemy, up to 7 thousand in number, makes a roundabout movement along the ridge of Kizil-dag in order to cut off our retreat to the city. Ismail Khan made a quick movement to the left, hurried his hundreds and, having taken a good position, stopped the roundabout movement with well-aimed fire, holding the enemy for two hours ... - from the report of the commandant of the city of Bayazet, the captain Stockvich

When the retreating column, firing back, approached the fortress gate, it was blocked by a large herd of donkeys laden with breadcrumbs, since the fortress food master decided to move his warehouses from the city to the citadel on that very day. There was a great confusion under the deadly fire of the enemy, which led to heavy human and material losses - all the provisions, donkeys, Cossacks’ horses, and the militiamen were captured by the enemy. Despite the heavy losses, the surviving part of Patsevich's detachment and the hundreds of remnants of Ismail Khan still managed to retreat to the citadel under the protection of the fortress walls. The garrison of the fortress consisted of six infantry companies, three hundred Cossacks, two guns and the remnants of the Erivan irregular equestrian regiment. In total, taking into account the losses incurred, about 1 500 people. The citadel was not prepared for the siege, since the commandant of the fortress did not give timely orders for the creation of water supplies, and placed the garrison's food warehouse in the city, and provisions were delivered to the citadel as needed. The besiegers took a stream from which water was piped into the fortress. Provisions remained for no more than three days. In such conditions, the 23-day defence of the Bayazet fortress began, which lasted from 6 to 28 June and went down in history as the "Bayazet seat". From Ismail Khan's reminiscences:

There was no positive information about Tergukasov's detachment; on the contrary, rumours penetrated into the garrison that it was surrounded and almost destroyed, which took away any hope for the outside help, and, of course, could influence the mood of the people to a certain extent ...In the conversations with me, the Lieutenant Colonel Patsevich and two or three other people have repeatedly spoken out in the sense that the outcome of our staying can only be inevitable death, if we do not capitulate.

Of course, I did not deny the possibility of such an end, but I always repeated at the same time that I would never agree to capitulate Bayazet also because I am a Muslim. I know that the capitulation would be attributed to this very circumstance, even if a thousand of other reasons were prompted for it ...

— "Defence of Bayazet - the story of the Lieutenant-General Khan Nakhchivanski", the newspaper "Caucasus", 12 April 1895

On the third day of the blockade, the heat, thirst and hunger began to drive the besieged into despair. The officers and lower ranks gathered in groups and discussed the situation. Voices began to be heard calling for capitulation. From Ismail Khan's reminiscences:

The faces of the speakers were gloomy. The listeners looked no less stern.

- It could have happened worse! - Suddenly exclaimed a young artillery officer, who was standing in the crowd with others, but whose name, unfortunately, I do not remember.

- After all, three times do not die?! We will fight as long as our legs are holding us, and there, that God will send us!

I silently stretched out my hand to this officer and told the others that the main things are not to lose heart and not to lose hope, since they will help us out, no matter what ...

— Defense of Bayazet - the story of the Lieutenant-General Khan Nakhchivanski", the newspaper "Caucasus", 12 April 1895

The young artillery officer, whom the Colonel Ismail Khan recalled, was the commander of the 4th platoon of the 4th battery of the 19th artillery brigade, the Lieutenant Nikolai Konstantinovich Tomashevsky (later artillery General).

On the morning of 8 June, the Turks, in large forces under the leadership of the former commandant of the city Kamal Ali Pasha, launched a powerful attack on the citadel. Succumbing to panic, the Lieutenant Colonel Patsevich, with the consent of a number of other officers, including the fortress commandant Shtokvich, decided to surrender Bayazet. The fire was stopped and a white flag was raised over the walls of the fortress. Ismail Khan at that time was near his seriously wounded son, the Praporshchik of the Erivan Equestrian Irregular Regiment Amanullah Khan Nakhchivanski. The fact that a white flag was raised over Bayazet was informed by the Lieutenant Tomashevsky. From Ismail Khan's reminiscences:

… Suddenly an artillery officer, about whom I spoke earlier, rushed in. He was agitated.

- Colonel, the fortress is surrendering! He exclaimed. - What do you say? How do they hand it over?! - I jumped up as if stung. - Patsevich raised a white flag and a huge mass of Turks has already rushed to our gate, - the officer explained. After that, I jumped out into the courtyard, where a crowd of officers and soldiers was gathered, and I really saw: a white flag fluttering high on a huge pole attached to the wall of the citadel, and Patsevich and several other officers were standing nearby. - Gentlemen, what are you doing?! ... - I shouted. “Did we take an oath to dishonour ourselves and the Russian weapons with a faint-hearted capitulation?! ... It's a shame! ... As long as there is even a drop of blood in our veins, we are obliged to fight and defend Bayazet in front of the Tsar! ... Whoever decides to act differently is a traitor, and that I will order to be shot immediately! Down with the flag, shoot guys!

- "Defense of Bayazet - the story of the Lieutenant-General Khan Nakhchivanski", the newspaper "Caucasus", 12 April 1895.

From that moment, in fact, having dismissed the Lieutenant Colonel Patsevich, the Colonel Ismail Khan Nakhchivanski, as a senior in rank, on his own initiative, took over the commandment of Bayazet's garrison. Shooting resumed, and Patsevich was one of the first to be mortally wounded, and he was wounded in the back. According to some reports, the shot was fired by one of the garrison's officers. After the white flag was torn down and the attack of the Turks was repulsed, Ismail Khan appointed the military foreman of the 2nd Khopersky Regiment of the Kuban Cossack Army, Olympiy Nikitich Kvanin, as his assistant in carrying out all orders for the defence of Bayazet. Having assumed the command of the garrison, Ismail Khan Nakhchivanski organized the defence of the fortress and in difficult conditions, without water and provisions, held it until the main forces of the Russian army approached. When another envoy who arrived at the citadel, one who fled to the enemy after the start of the war, told Ismail Khan that if the garrison did not capitulate, would be hanged, Ismail Khan replied that the envoy himself would be hanged first as a traitor, and this order was immediately carried out. By the highest order of 19 December 1877, "for military distinction", he was awarded the rank of Major General, and on 31 December 1877, "for exemplary and bravery management shown during the blockade of Bayazet in June 1877", he was awarded the Order of the "Saint Great Martyr and Victorious George of the IV degree”.

== Subsequent career ==
On 28 October 1890 was marked the 50th anniversary of Ismail Khan Nakhchivanski's service in the officer ranks. On this day, the hero received numerous congratulations. From a telegram from the Minister of War:

"The Sovereign Emperor, on the occasion of the fiftieth anniversary of your service in the officer ranks, has most mercifully deigned you to be promoted to Lieutenant General, with the retention of the Caucasian Military District with the troops and with the increased salary according to the rank of 2,034 rubles a year. Congratulations, Your Excellency, with the Monarch's Grace and Happy Anniversary. The Minister of War, the Adjutant General Vannovsky."

From the telegram of the Grand Duke Mikhail Nikolaevich:

To the Lieutenant General Ismail Khan. I congratulate you on this significant day of your life and thank you for your service under My commandment. Mikhail.

On 14 June 14, 1908, at the age of 89, Ismail Khan applied for his resignation to Nicholas II. On 18 August 1908, the Emperor, taking into account the "very long and military service of the Lieutenant General Ismail Khan," by the Imperial Order promoted him to the rank of General to the General of the cavalry with dismissal from service with the uniform and pension.

During his service, Ismail Khan became the Knight of the Orders of St. George the Victorious of the 4th degree, St. Vladimir of the 2nd, 3rd degree, and 4th degree with a bow, St. Anne of the 1st degree, St. Stanislaus of the 1st and 2nd degree with the Imperial Crown of the 3rd degree with swords. He was Highly allowed to accept and wear the Persian Orders of the Lion and the Sun of the 1st, 2nd, and the 3rd degree, with the Star. He has been awarded many medals. The hero of Bayazet's defence, the Cavalry General Ismail Khan Nakhchivanski, died on 10 February 1909 in his hometown - Nakhichevan. At the funeral at the head of the general there were 14 pillows with orders.

The personality of Ismail Khan again attracted the attention after the release of the TV series "Bayazet" based on the novel of the same name by Valentin Pikul, where Ismail Khan was presented in a negative light.

== Military ranks ==
- Entered the service (1 May 1839)
- Praporshchik (28.10.1840)
- Lieutenant (20.03.1844)
- Stabskapitän (30.08.1847)
- Captain (05.02.1853)
- Rittmeister (04.08.1855)
- Colonel (03.04.1860)
- Major general (19.12.1877)
- Lieutenant general (28.10.1890)
- General of the cavalry (18.08.1908)

== Awards ==
Russian:

- Order of the St. Stanislaus of the 3rd degree with swords (1856)
- Order of the St. Vladimir of the 4th degree with a bow for 25 years in the officer ranks (1867)
- Order of the St. Stanislaus of the 2nd degree with the imperial crown (1872)
- Order of the St. George of the 4th degree (31 December 1877)
- Order of the St. Vladimir of the 3rd degree (1883)
- Order of the St. Stanislaus of the 1st degree (1888)
- Order of the St. Anne of the 1st degree (1901)
- Order of the St. Vladimir of the 2nd degree (1907)
- Medal "In Memory of the War of 1853-1856"
- Medal "In memory of the Russian-Turkish War of 1877-1878."
- Medal "In commemoration of the Emperor Alexander III reign"
- Medal "In memory of the Emperor Nicholas I reign"

Qajar dynasty:

- Order of the Lion and the Sun of the 3rd degree with diamonds (1846)
- Order of the Lion and the Sun of the 2nd degree with star (1868)
- Order of the Lion and the Sun of the 1st degree (1903)

== Family ==
He was married the first time to Khanym-Jan Khanum (about 1819 -?), the daughter of the Kengerli tribe head, Novruz Agha. His second marriage was to Shovket Khanum, the daughter of Abbas-Quli Khan Erivanski. He had nine children:

- The eldest son - Amanullah Khan Nakhchivanski (15 June 1845 - around 1891) - entered the service on 6 May 1865 in His Majesty's Own Squire Convoy. On 1 November 1865, he was promoted to cadet. Upon completion of the established period of service, on 21 August 1869, he was promoted to militia ensign with the status of army cavalry. He was awarded with a silver medal "For service in the Convoy of the Sovereign Emperor Alexander Nikolaevich" on the Anninskaya ribbon to be worn around the neck. After the start of the Russian-Turkish War of 1877–1878, he is enlisted in the newly formed Erivan Equestrian Irregular Regiment. On 6 June 1877, in a battle near Bayazet, he was seriously wounded. He is a participant of the 23-day "Bayazet seat." On 19 June of the same year, “According to the Imperial Power represented by His Imperial Highness, the Commander-in-Chief of the Caucasian Army, he was awarded the Order of the St. Anna of the 3rd degree with swords and a bow." On 19 December 1877, he was enlisted in the Life Guards Cossack Regiment as a cornet by an Imperial Order. On 28 March 1882, the Cornet of the Life Guards of the Cossack Regiment, Amanulla KhanNakhchivanski, which was at the disposal of the Headquarters of the Caucasian Military District, was promoted to lieutenant by an Imperial Order. [19] On 9 April 1889, by the highest order, he was promoted to staff-captain. He was married to the daughter of the Major General Prince Khasay Khan Utsmiyev and the famous Azerbaijani poet Khurshidbanu Begum "Natavan", the Princess Khanbika Khanum Utsmiyeva (1855-1921).
- Eldest daughter - Tarlan Khanum (13 October 1848-?). She was married to Abbas Quli Khan Erivanski.
- Khadyr Khanum (15 July 1850-?)
- Bahman Khan (2 September 1851-?)
- Habib Ulla Khan (17 October 1852-?). He was married to the Princess Navwab Agha Khanum, the daughter of the Prince Bahman Mirza Qajar.
- Soltanat Khanum (20 October 1855-?)
- Aziz Khan I (15 May 1857-?)
- Sona Begum (20 February 1859-?)
- Aziz Khan II (15 January 1860 - 10 April 1883). Militia Praporshchik officer.

== Bibliography ==
- Баязет // Большой Энциклопедический словарь. — 2000.
- Anton Ludwigovich Gisetti, Сборник сведений о Георгиевских кавалерах и боевых знаков отличий Кавказских войск: в 2 частях, Vasily Potto. 1901.
- Anton Ludwigovich Gisetti, Библиографический указатель печатанным на русском языке сочинениям и статьям о военных действиях русских войск на Кавказе. Изд. Военно-учёного комитета Главного штаба. — СПб., 1901
- Ежегодник русской армии за 1878 г., часть II. — СПб., 1878
- Vasily Fedorovich Novitsky, Военная энциклопедия Сытина, СПб.: Т-во И. Д. Сытина, 1911–1915.
- Памятник Восточной войны 1877—1878 гг. — СПб., 1878
- Ибрагим Багиров. Генералы племени Кянгерлы. — Баку, 1994
