= Fatma Khanum Kamina =

Azerbaijani poet (1841-1898)

- Born: Fatma Xanım Mirzə Bəybaba qızı Kəminə; 1841; Shusha
- Died: April 15, 1898 (aged 56–57); Shusha
- Occupation: Poetees

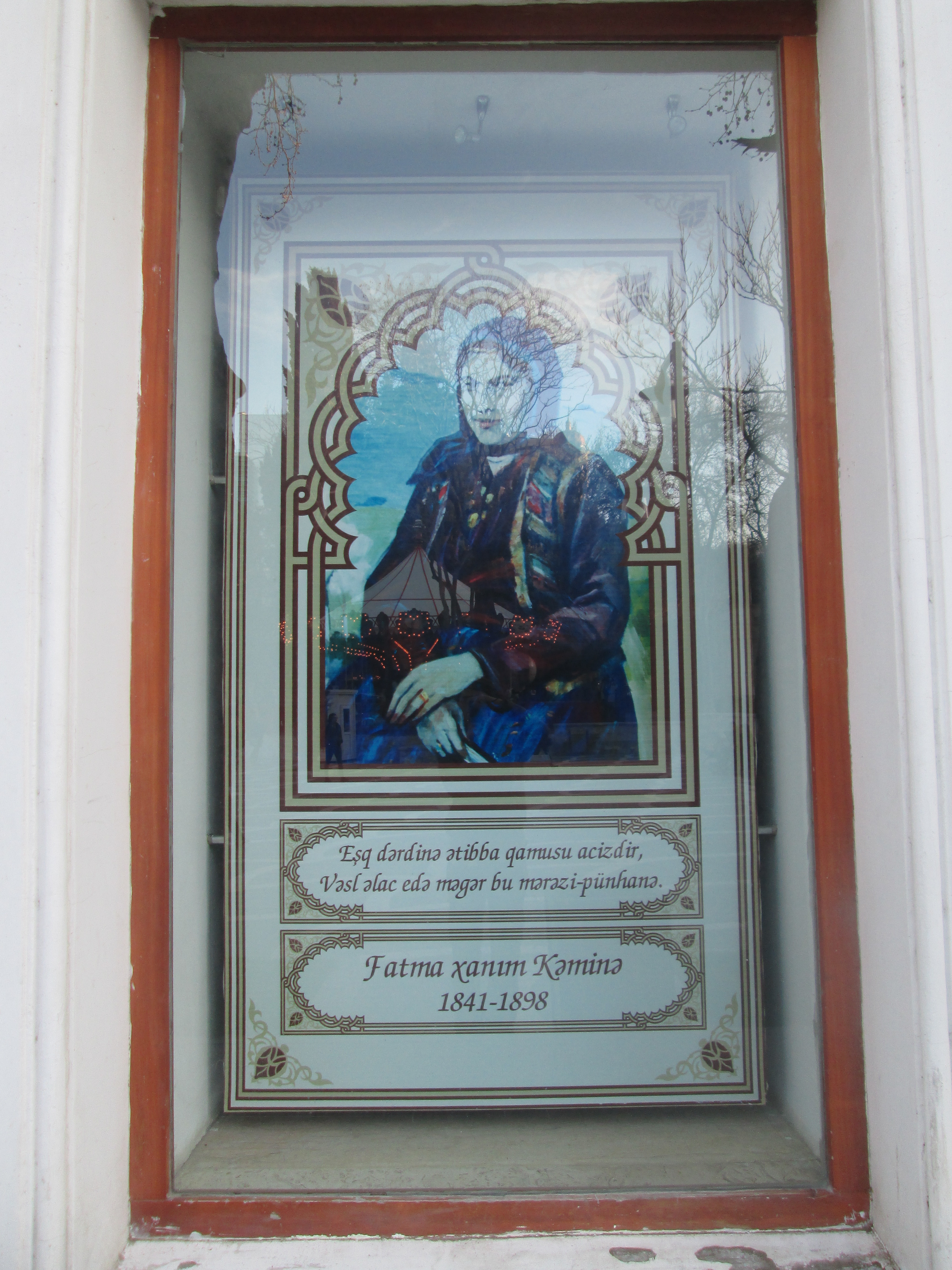
A portrait of Fatma Khanum Kamina in the window of the Nizami Literature Museum building

Fatma Khanum Kamina (Azerbaijani: Fatma xanım Kəminə, born 1841, Shusha, Shusha Uyezd, Shamakhi Governorate, Russian Empire - died 1898, Shusha, Shusha Uyezd, Russian Empire) was a 19th-century female Azerbaijani poet known by her per name Kamina (the Humble One).

== Life ==
She was born in 1841 in Merdinli quarter of Shusha. Her father Mirza Beybaba Fana (1787-1867, also known as Aghamirze bey) was also a poet. She was educated in Shusha. She was called "Mirza Fatma Khanum" by the people because of her education. Most of her poems are written in classical form. Mir Mohsun Navvab stated in "Tazkireyi-Navvab" that Fatma khanum had 400 poems; though it doesn't appear that they survived. Fatma took an active part in the "Mejlisi-Faramushan" gatherings of Shusha intellectuals led by Mir Mohsun Navvab and in the "Mejlisi-uns" literary circle.

She died in 1898 in Shusha. Writing about her death, Firidun bey Kocharli called her "one of the rare people of the time".

== Family ==
She was from Tahirovs, one of the noble families of Shusha. She was a relative of Tahira Tahirova (Foreign Minister of Azerbaijan Soviet Socialist Republic) and Mirza Hasan Tahirzadeh (fourth Sheikh ul-Islam of the Caucasus).

== See also ==
- Gonchabegüm Nakhchivanski
