= Ordubad uezd =

County of the Russian Empire

Coordinates: 38°54′29″N 46°01′40″E

Ordubad uezd Ордубадский уезд
- Uezd
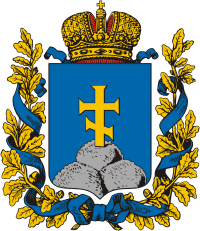
- Coat of arms
- Interactive map of Ordubad uezd
- Country: Russian Empire
- Viceroyalty: Caucasus
- Governorate: Erivan
- Established: 1849
- Abolished: 1868
- Capital: Ordubad

The Ordubad uezd (Note: Russian: Ордубадский уезд, pre-reform orthography: Ордубадскій уѣздъ, romanized: Ordubadskiy uyezd; Azerbaijani: اردوباد قضاسی, romanized: Ordūbād qaz̤āsı; Armenian: Օրդուբադի գավառ, romanized: Òrdubadi gavaṙ) was a county (uezd) of the Erivan Governorate of the Caucasus Viceroyalty of the Russian Empire with its center in Ordubad from 1849 until 1868. It included the southern part of the Nakhichevan exclave of present-day Azerbaijan and the southern part of the Syunik Province of present-day Armenia, including Meghri.

== History ==
The territory of the uezd was part of the Nakhichevan Khanate of Iran until 1828, when according to the Treaty of Turkmenchay, it was annexed to the Russian Empire. It was administered as part of the Armenian Oblast from 1828 to 1840. In 1844, the Caucasus Viceroyalty was re-established, in which the territory of the Ordubad uezd formed part of the Tiflis Governorate. In 1849, the Erivan Governorate was established, separate from the Tiflis Governorate. It was made up of the Erivan, Nakhchivan, Alexandropol, Nor Bayazet, and Ordubad uezds. The Ordubad uezd was abolished and incorporated into the Nakhichevan uezd and the Zangezur uezd of the Elizavetpol Governorate in 1868.
