= Abbas Qoli Khan Kangarlu =

Khan of Nakhichevan intermittently from 1781 to 1812

Abbas Qoli Khan Kangarli

Khan of Nakhichevan
- Reign: 1781 – 1783
- Predecessor: Vali Qoli Khan
- Successor: Jafar Qoli Khan
- Reign: 1787 – 1787
- Predecessor: Jafar Qoli Khan
- Successor: Kalb-Ali Khan Kangarlu
- Reign: 1797 – 1801
- Predecessor: Kalb-Ali Khan Kangarlu
- Successor: Kalb-Ali Khan Kangarlu
- Reign: 1804 – 1804
- Predecessor: Kalb-Ali Khan Kangarlu
- Successor: Kalb-Ali Khan Kangarlu
- Reign: 1807 – 1808
- Predecessor: Kalb-Ali Khan Kangarlu
- Successor: Kalb-Ali Khan Kangarlu
- Reign: 1810 – 1812
- Predecessor: Kalb-Ali Khan Kangarlu
- Successor: Kalb-Ali Khan Kangarlu
- Born: Nakhichevan, Nakhichevan Khanate
- Died: 1812; Nakhichevan, Nakhichevan Khanate
- Father: Murtaza Quli Khan

Abbas Qoli Khan Kangarli (Persian: عباس قلی خان کنگرلی, died 1810) was one of the rulers of the Nakhichevan Khanate in Afsharid Iran.

== History ==
=== First reign ===
In 1779, Karim Khan Zand died, and anarchy again reigned in the Persian state. In the early 1780s, with the support of Huseyn-Ali Khan of Erivan, Heraclius II of Georgia and Ibrahim Khalil Khan of Karabakh, Abbas Qoli Khan was declared the ruler of the Nakhichevan khanate. In 1783, military happiness leaned on the side of others: Imam Qoli Khan of Urumi was killed, and Abbas Qoli Khan of Nakhichevan, despite the patronage of Ibrahim Khan of Karabakh, was forced to give way to his cousin Jafar Qoli Khan. The overthrown Abbas Qoli retired to Georgia where he was sheltered by Heraclius II.

In January 1792, with a memorable "visit" to the walls of Nakhichevan of the 11.000 army of Ibrahim Khalil Khan of Karabakh and his brother-in-law Umma Khan V of Avar, the people of Nakhichevan withstood a 6-day siege. About seven hundred highlanders fell on one of the squares of Nakhichevan. Area of the city in front of the Nakhichevan railway station until the middle of the 20th century bore the name "Lezgi Gyrylan" ("Place of destruction of Lezgins"). The final result of the fight brought down the troops of the Khoy and Erivan khans who intervened in it, who came to assistance to Kalb-Ali Khan. Ibrahim Khan and Omar Khan, who each lost about thousands of warriors hastily retreated. People of Nakhchivan buried with honor about a hundred of his people.

=== Second reign ===
Kalb-Ali Khan sent his brother Abbas Qoli Khan as a hostage to Agha Mohammed Khan, thereby killing two birds with one stone: preserving the Nakhichevan khanate and getting rid of his eternal rival. Kalb-Ali Khan himself went to meet the shah in Ardabil. Nevertheless, Agha Mohammed seized him. Kalb-Ali Khan was subjected to execution, used in Persia to punish recalcitrant vassals. His eyes were gouged out. The blinded Kalb-Ali Khan was imprisoned, the Nakhichevan Khanate was devastated and the population was partially driven to Persia. Abbas Quli Khan obedient to the Shah was put in the place of the ruler.

In 1801, Kalb-Ali Khan achieves his cherished goal — he regains power in Nakhichevan deposing his brother. The indignant Fath-Ali Shah immediately sends a serdar to Tabriz with an order to gather a militia and restore Abbas Qoli Khan in Nakhichevan.

=== Relations with Russians ===
At the same time, the commander-in-chief in the Caucasus general of the Russian army Pavel Tsitsianov established contact with Abbas Qoli Khan, through whom he expected to receive assistance during a new expedition planned for the spring of 1805. The main rival of Kalb-Ali Khan immediately went for rapprochement and promised to bring the Russians to Nakhichevan. Throughout the spring and summer of 1805, secret relations between the Russian general and Abbas Qoli Khan did not stop as the expedition to the Erivan and Nakhichevan khanates was being prepared.

The Russian military hero Pyotr Kotlyarevsky and Mehdigulu Khan Javanshir wrote to Abbas Qoli Khan asking him to come to Shusha under the pretext of his own safety. Abbas Qoli Khan did not refuse, but feeling that something was wrong he delayed the visit. To the second message of Mehdigulu Khan he did not give an answer at all. Abbas Qoli-khan took the intention to go abroad and for this he asked Abbas Mirza for troops, "with which he could transfer the inhabitants of the Sisian mahal to the other side (beyond Aras)." Without delay, Kotlyarevsky sent a captain with a hundred soldiers to Sisian with instructions to bring the khan to Karabakh, but on February 2, 1807, Abbas Qoli Khan fled to Persia.

In a document dated 1810, he is mentioned as deceased. In another document, information slips through that he was executed.

== See also ==
- Nakhichevan khanate
- Kalb-Ali Khan Kangarlu

== Sources ==
- Anvar Chingizoglu (2013), Abbasqulu xan Kəngərli (in Azerbaijani). Baku. "Mütərcim". p. 68.
- Nagdaliev, Farkhad; Нагдалиев, Фархад. (2006). Khany Nakhichevanskie v Rossiĭskoĭ Imperii. Moskva: Novyĭ argument. ISBN 5-903224-01-6. OCLC 152052177.
