= Kotlyarevsky =

Kotlyarevsky or Kotliarevskyi (Ukrainian: Котляревський) is a surname of Ukrainian origin. The known persons are:

- Ivan Kotliarevsky, Ukrainian writer
- Pyotr Kotlyarevsky, Russian general
