= Abbasabad (fortress) =

Abbasabad (Persian: عباس‌آباد) was a fortress of strategic importance for the defense of the Nakhichevan Khanate.

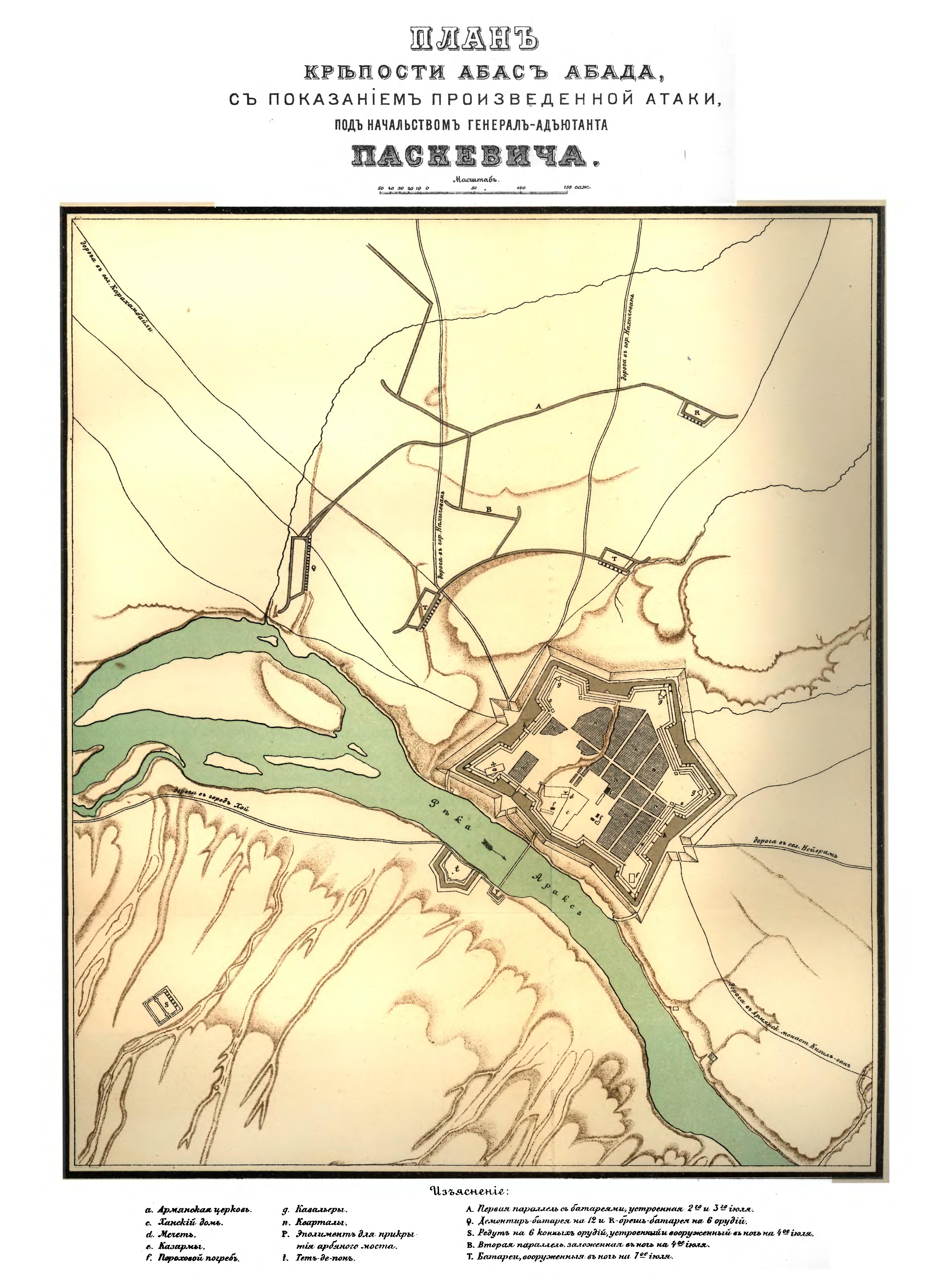
The attack plan on the Abbasabad Fortress by General Paskevich in 1827

It was built with the help of French engineers by Abbas Mirza, the crown prince of Iran, in 1810. He appointed Ehsan Khan Kangarlu as commander of the fortress in 1827, during the Russo-Persian War of 1826–1828. During a siege by the Russians, Ehsan Khan secretly arranged for the gates of the fortress to be opened to the Russian commander General Ivan Paskevich on 22 July 1827.

During the Russian rule the fortress was abandoned and fell into ruin. The ruins remained until 1970s, when they were buried under the water during construction of the Aras water reservoir.

== Sources ==
- Ekbal, Kamran (1982). "ʿAbbāsābād". In Yarshater, Ehsan (ed.). Encyclopædia Iranica. Vol. I/1: Āb–ʿAbd-al-Hamīd. London and New York: Routledge & Kegan Paul. pp. 85–86. ISBN 978-0-71009-090-4.
