= Kelbali Khan Nakhchivanski =

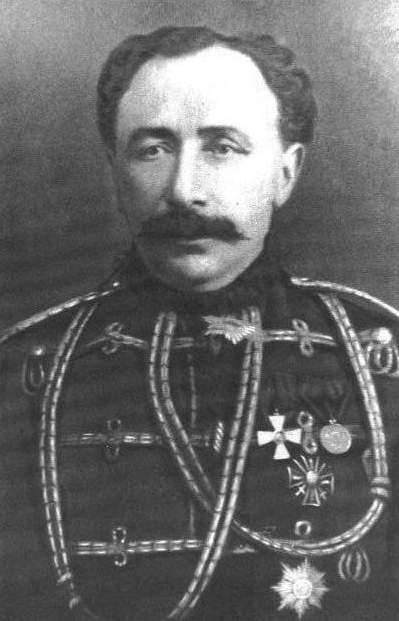
- Born: 1824; Nakhchivan Khanate
- Died: April 1883 (aged 59); Nakhchivan City, Erivan Governorate
- Military career
- Allegiance: (Russia) Russian Empire
- Branch: Cavalry
- Service years: 1848–1880
- Rank: Major General
- Commands: "Kengerly Cavalry" "Erivan Bey Regiment" " Cavalry Irregular Regiment"; 2nd Consolidated Cavalry Division; 2nd Brigade of the 1st Caucasian Cavalry Division
- Conflicts: Crimean War; Russo-Turkish War
- Awards: 1st Class Order of Saint Anne 4th Class Order of St. George 2nd Class Ode of Saint Stanislaus 3rd Class Order of Saint Vladimir 4th Class Order of Saint Vladimir 1st Class Ode of Saint Stanislaus 1st Class Order of the Lion and the Sun

Kelbali Khan Ehsan Khan oghlu Nakhchivanski (Azerbaijani: Kəlbəli Xan Ehsan Xan oğlu Naxçıvanski, in some documents Kalbalai-Khan-Eksan-Khan-Ogly; 1824 – April 1883) - was an Azerbaijani Cavalry General (14 September 1874) in the Imperial Russian Army. Father of the Adjutant General, General of Cavalry Huseyn Khan Nakhchivanski and brother of the General of the Cavalry Ismail Khan Nakhchivanski. His father Ehsan Khan Nakhichevansky, later known by his Russified name of Ehsan Khan Nakhichevansky was the last ruler of the Nakhichevan Khanate.

== The beginning of the military service ==
At the age of thirteen, "by the order of the Emperor Nicholas I", Kelbali Khan was admitted to the Corps of His Imperial Majesty's Pages in St. Petersburg. However, he failed to complete his studies due to a serious illness that forced him to return to his homeland in Nakhchivan. After a while, having regained his health, Kelbali Khan began the service within the Kengerlinsky Equestrian Militia (Kengerly Cavalry). In 1848, being already the head of the Kengerlinsky Equestrian Militia, he took part in the Dagestan expedition. Kelbali Khan received his first officer rank in 1849. From the order of the Minister of War:

St. Petersburg. The day of the 31st March 1849. No. 8. On irregular troops: By the Highest commands. Is promoted: For distinction: In affairs against the Highlanders. In ensign: Kengerlinsky Equestrian Militia, the Nakhchivan resident: Chief of Militia Kalbalai-Khan.

On 14 April 1851, he was appointed as junior official for special assignments under the Erivan military governor, and from 13 December of the same year, Kelbali Khan Nakhchivanski became a senior official for special assignments under the Erivan military governor. On 30 January 1853, he was promoted to the second lieutenant. In the autumn of the same year, the Kengerlinsky Equestrian Militia was re-formed, the head of which was appointed Kelbali Khan on 25 October.

== Crimean War ==
During the Crimean War of 1853–1856, as part of the Caucasian Corps, Kelbali Khan took part in the hostilities in the Caucasian-Asia Minor theatre of operations. On 14 May 1854, the Second Lieutenant Nakhchivanski was appointed as head of the Erivan Bek squad, replacing in this position his elder brother, the Captain Ismail Khan. The Erivan Bek squad became part of the Erivan detachment of the Russian troops. On 17 July 1854, a 5.000-strong Erivan detachment under the commandment of the Lieutenant General Baron K. K. Wrangel defeated the 16 000 strong Turkish corps of Selim Pasha in a battle on the Chingil Heights and occupied Bayazet.

"For distinction in the affairs with the Turks" on 4 December, Kelbali Khan was promoted to lieutenant. On 15 April of the following year, he was awarded the Order of the Holy Great Martyr and Victorious George of the IV degree for the horse attack on 17 July 1854 on the Chingil Heights. From the description of the feat:

The second lieutenant, head of the Erivan Bek squad. When attacking the enemy's battery, this officer, being in the head of the squad he commanded, in spite of the murderous canister and rifle fire, jumped onto the battery, hacked several artillerymen with his own hand and took one gun in action.

== Interwar period ==
In 1856, the lieutenant Kelbali Khan, along with other envoys of the Caucasus and Transcaucasia, represented the Erivan province at the coronation ceremony of the Emperor Alexander II in Moscow. On 26 August of the same year, by the highest decree with the rank of lieutenant, he was transferred to the Life Guards Hussar Regiment, leaving him as a senior official on special assignments under the Erivan military governor. In 1857, he was awarded the Order of the Lion and the Sun of the 2nd degree by the Shah of Qajar dynasty. On 12 April 1859, for distinction in service, he was promoted to Stabsrittmeister. In September of the same year, he was appointed to serve in the Caucasian army. On 3 April 1860, Kelbali Khan was promoted to Rittmeister. From 22 June 1862 to 9 July 1867, he was inspector of the zemstvo guard of the Erivan province. On 19 April 1864, Kelbali Khan was promoted to Colonel. On 3 June, he was again appointed to serve in the Caucasian army.

In March 1871, he was awarded the Order of Saint Stanislaus of the 2nd degree, and was also granted by the imperial crown to this order. On 14 September 1874, Kelbali Khan was promoted to Major General for "distinction in service", with enrolment in the army cavalry and with the abandonment of the Caucasian army. On 22 September 1875, he was awarded the Order of St. Vladimir of the 4th degree with a bow by the highest order for length of service in the officer's ranks for 25 years.

== Russian-Turkish war ==
After the start of the Russo-Turkish War of 1877-1878, by the order of the Caucasian Military District dated with 10 May 1877, the Major General Kelbali Khan Nakhchivanski was appointed the commander of the Irregular Equestrian Brigade, formed from the Erivan and Kurtinsky mounted irregular regiments. The squad became part of the Erivan detachment of the Russian troops and had the task of covering the state border from a possible enemy invasion of the territory of the Erivan province. During the defence of Bayazet in June 1877, the Major General Kelbali Khan Nakhchivanski, in fact, was the only link between the besieged garrison and the commandment of the Russian troops. On 5 June, to reinforce the Bayazet garrison there was sent a squad of four hundred of the Erivan irregular cavalry regiment headed by the Colonel Ismail Khan Nakhchivanski. From a telegram from the Major General Kelbali Khan Nakhchivanski to the Erivan military governor the Major General M. I. Roslavlev dated with 10 June 1877:

Now I have received the following note from the commandant of the city of Bayazet through a secretly sneaked man, sent out on 8 June at 9 o'clock in the afternoon;

all our troops since the 6th date, from 10 o'clock in the morning, were surrounded in the Bayazet fortress; the Turks are bombarding; the situation is critical, mainly there is no water; our loss is great; Patsevich was wounded, Kovalevsky was killed; all horses of the cavalry have been taken by the enemy; we have no help from the detachment; help us as soon as possible, otherwise everything is lost; there are very few cartridges, the enemy's assaults are still beated off ...

I consider it too risky to go to rescue with a detachment of 4 companies, 150 Cossacks, without weapons, especially since firstly we have to take by storm the city, which is occupied by the enemy. There are still no expected troops neither from Alexandropol nor from the Erivan detachment.

Without waiting for reinforcements, Kelbali Khan decided to move to Bayazet. From the report of the General Kelbali Khan Nakhchivanski to the Erivan military governor, the Major General M. I. Roslavlev, dated with 14 June 1877, No. 54:

Waiting for the arrival of the Major General Loris-Melikov's column for the joint rescue of the Bayazet garrison, I left one hundred of the Elizavetpol irregular cavalry regiment for this position on the Chingil Heights, on the 12th date, at 6 am, with a detachment entrusted to me, consisting of 4 companies, including 657 people from the Crimean, Stavropol regiments and the Erivan local battalion, 71 man of the foot militia of the Erivan province, under the commandment of the chief of infantry, the Colonel Preobrazhensky, and a cavalry - 170 Cossacks from different units, the irregular cavalry regiments of Erivan - 100, horse hunters from the Erivan province - 57, the Erivan-Kurtinsky regiment - 35 and two hundred of the Elisavetpol regiment with the chief of the cavalry, the Lieutenant Colonel Perepelovsky and with the adjutant of His Imperial Highness the Colonel Tolstoy who arrived in my detachment, I set out to the 3rd Bayazet Heights. At 3 o'clock in the afternoon, before reaching Bayazet 3 versts, my movement was noticed by the enemy; the Turks stepped to meet us and opened a firefight on us which lasted until 8 o'clock in the evening; since I have seen the impossibility of going further, or taking a position on the spot, I retreated five versts to the devastated village of Karadzha, where near the Tashly-chai river I set up the detachment on a bivouac. On the 13th date, at 7 o'clock in the morning, I noticed that the enemy from both the Bayazet and the Teperiz sides was advancing with large forces of infantry and cavalry. Seeing the superiority of its forces and not having a convenient position for defence, I preferred to retreat to a more advantageous position; but the enemy fiercely began to pursue us and intended to bypass our flanks... Not allowing the enemy to reach their goal, until 2 pm, retreating under heavy firefight, I crossed the village Karabulakh and 2 versts away from it, took a strong and advantageous position for defence, from which, thanks to the commanding heads of the units, the perseverance and well-aimed shooting of the infantry and the combined rocket platoon, the rapid timely movement of the Cossacks to the enemy's left flank, all the enemy's attacks were repelled, who, seeing the impossibility of bypassing or overcoming us, began to retreat from 5 o'clock in the afternoon; having stayed at this position until 8 o'clock in the evening, I retreated to the Chingil Heights, where, after giving the troops a rest and leaving the observation picket, at 12 o'clock in the morning I arrived at the Orgovsky post. Losses from the enemy side, according to information delivered to me, 112 killed and 40 wounded; from our side killed lower ranks - 13, Cossacks - 3 and militiamen - 2 and missing lower ranks - 3; horses killed - 7.

Finally, on 22 June, Kelbali Khan received the long-awaited reinforcements, but nevertheless, he could not move to Bayazet. From a message to the Erivan military governor, the Major General M. I. Roslavlev, dated with 23 June 1877:

Yesterday, two companies, an artillery battalion and three hundred Cossacks, arrived to the Chingil Heights, and at 9 o'clock in the evening I received a letter from the Colonel Morozov as follows:

"The prince of Qajar came from detachment; he says that Ter-Gukasov is spending the night in our Caravanserai in the most disastrous situation, he is going to Igdyr. You cannot move to Bayazet, but you should return to Tergukasov's aid.

As a result, I arrived to Igdyr, reported to Tergukasov, am asking for instructions.

General Kelbali Khan Nakhichevanski".

After lifting the blockade, the detachment of Kelbali Khan Nakhchivanski for some time continued to carry out tasks for the defence of the Erivan province. From the telegram of the General Tergukasov to the Grand Duke Mikhail Nikolaevich on 9 July:

Due to the changed circumstances and the new information about the enemy, the assumption of transferring the detachment entrusted to me to Tauz-Kul and Abaz-gol could not be realized. The military considerations force us to concentrate most of it on the Chingil pass and its environs ... For the defence of the western part of the Erivan province from Abdurakhman to Abaz-gol, I appointed General Kelbali-khan, to whom I subordinated the Talyn and Kulpinsky battalions of the Taman regiment, six hundred Cossacks and the militia ...

From the order of the General Tergukasov to the commander of the brigade of the 1st Caucasian Cavalry Division, the Major General Prince A. Shcherbatov, dated with 31 July 1877:

Attaching with this in a copy the report of the Major General Kelbali Khan Nakhchivanski, the commander of the troops from Caravanserai to Kulpa, I ask you to set out with the column entrusted to you in the direction of Kulpa to the village of Pirli (Pirali) to reinforce the detachment of the Major General Kelbali Khan ... Although the Major General Kelbali Khan is lower in rank than you, but, as he knows in all the details and all the circumstances the case and the area itself, then, upon joining him, you have to be guided by his instructions ...

In October 1877, as part of the Erivan detachment, Kelbali Khan participated in the battle and defeat of the Turkish troops under the commandment of Mukhtar Pasha, who were trying to block the path of the Russian troops to Erzurum at the Deve Boynu pass. On 11 December of the same year, the Major General Kelbali Khan was awarded the Order of St. Vladimir of the 3rd degree with swords. On 2 June 1878, Kelbali Khan received the Order of St. Stanislav of the 1st degree with swords "as a reward for the excellent courage and bravery shown in the affairs with the Turks as part of the Erivan detachment in June 1877".

On 13 July 1878, he was appointed the commander of the 2nd Consolidated Cavalry Division. On 8 December 1878, "as a reward for the excellent courage and bravery shown in the affairs with the Turks at Deve Boynu on 23 October 1877," the Major General Kelbali Khan was granted by the Emperor Alexander II with the golden saber with the inscription "For Bravery" with diamonds. On 24 January 1879, as a reward for the "excellent courage and bravery shown in different times with the Turks in 1877", he was awarded the Order of the St. Anna of the 1st degree with swords.

== Last years ==
From 25 July 1878 to the first half of March 1880, Kelbali Khan commanded the 2nd Brigade of the 1st Caucasian Cavalry Division. However, the deteriorating estate of his health did not allow Kelbali Khan to continue serving in the ranks. On 16 March 1880, he handed over the commandment of the brigade and was assigned to be at the disposal of the Commander-in-Chief of the Caucasian Army, the Grand Duke Mikhail Nikolaevich, with the enrolment in the army cavalry.

Kelbali Khan Ehsan Khan oghlu Nakhchivanski died in April 1883 with the rank of major general at the age of 59.

== Military ranks ==
- Ensign (31 March 1849)
- Second lieutenant (30 January 1853)
- Lieutenant (1854)
- Headquarters Captain (12 April 1859)
- Captain (3 April 1860)
- Colonel (19 April 1864)
- Major General (14 September 1874)

== Awards ==
- Order of the St. George of the 4th degrees (15 April 1855)
- Order of the St. Stanislaus of the 2nd degree with the imperial crown (1871)
- Order of the St. Vladimir of the 4th degrees with a bow for 25 years in the officer ranks (22 September 1875)
- Order of the St. Vladimir of the 3rd degree with swords (11 December 1877)
- Order of the St. Stanislaus of the 1st degree with swords (2 June 1878)
- Gold saber "For Bravery" with diamonds (8 December 1878)
- Order of the St. Anne of the 1st degree with swords (24 January 1879)
- Order of the Lion and the Sun of the 2nd degree (1857? by Shah of Qajar dynasty)

== Family ==
He was married to Khurshid Khanum (1828 -?), daughter of the Major Ahmed Khan Erivanski. Had eight children:

Zeinab-Begum (1851-?), Badir-Nisa-Begum (about 1853 -?), Ehsan Khan (1855–1894), Jafar-Kuli Khan (1859–1929), Shah Jahan Begum (1860-?), Rahim Khan (1860-?), Huseyn Khan (1863–1919), and Zarin-Taj Khanum (1866-?), who was married to the Major General Maksud Alikhanov-Avarsky.

== Bibliography ==
- Военная энциклопедия / Под ред. В. Ф. Новицкого и др. — СПб.: Т-во И. Д. Сытина, 1911–1915.
- Gisetti, Anton Ludwigovich (1901). Сборник сведений о Георгиевских кавалерах и боевых знаков отличий Кавказских войск: в 2 частях. Тифлис: Воен.-ист. отд-ние при Штабе Кавк.
- Томкеев, В. И. (1908). Материалы для описания русско-турецкой войны 1877—1878 гг. на Кавказско-Малоазиатском театре: в 7 томах. St. Petersburg: Тип. Морского Министерства.
- Старчевский А. А. Памятник Восточной войны 1877—1878 г
- Shamistan Nazirli. Azərbaycan generallar; - Baku, 1991.
- Ibrahim Baghirov. Ибрагим Багиров. Kəngərli tayfasının generalları - Baku, 1994. Г
