= Maqsud Sultan Kangarlu =

Safavid military commander and governor (1600s)

Maqsud Sultan Kangarlu was a Safavid military commander during the reign of king Abbas I (r. 1588–1629), who also served as the governor of Nakhchivan from 1605 to 1630. Maqsud Sultan was a member of the Kangarlu branch of the Turkoman Ustajlu tribe, one of the original Qizilbash tribes that had supplied power to the Safavids since its earliest days. He played an important role in the mass relocation of the empire's Armenian subjects in the early years of the 17th century.

== Sources ==
- Floor, Willem M. (2008). Titles and Emoluments in Safavid Iran: A Third Manual of Safavid Administration, by Mirza Naqi Nasiri. Washington, DC: Mage Publishers. p. 248. ISBN 978-1933823232.
- Oberling, P. (2010). "KANGARLU". Encyclopaedia Iranica, Vol. XV, Fasc. 5. p. 495.

Preceded by Cheragh Sultan Ustajlu	Governor of Nakhchivan; 1605–1630	Succeeded by Morad Khan Ustajlu
