= Battle of Deve-boyun =

1916 military engagement of the Caucasus Campaign

- Part of the Erzurum offensive of the Caucasus campaign
Date	February 1916
Location	Deveboynu (Erzurum), Erzurum, Ottoman Empire
Result	Russian breakthrough

Belligerents
Russian Empire	Ottoman Empire

Commanders and leaders
Nikolai Yudenich	Mahmut Kamil Pasha

The Battle of Deve-boyun was a pivotal phase of the Russian offensive against the Erzurum fortress complex in February 1916. The Deve-boyun ridge, a natural defensive barrier long considered the core of the Erzurum fortified camp, served as the primary line of resistance for the retreating Ottoman Third Army.

== Strategic importance ==
The Deve-boyun ridge was considered "impregnable" and was the heart of the Erzurum defensive system. It consisted of two rings of forts: an outer ring including the forts of Coban-dede and Dalan-göz, and a second line along the main ridge featuring the Sivişli and Yildirim forts. The defenses were strengthened by extensive trench systems and wire fields engineered by German specialist Colonel von Posselt.

== Russian strategy ==
Unlike previous attempts to storm the fortress, General Nikolai Yudenich did not intend to conduct a traditional siege, as his artillery was considered inadequate against modern forts. Instead, he utilized the strategy of attacking the fortress as an "extended fortified position" by finding and breaking through the weakest points in the defensive line.

By February 1916, Russian forces of the I Caucasian Corps were deployed between the Upper and Lower Toy villages and the Ali-baba-dag range, directly in front of the Deve-boyun and Palandöken forts, keeping the defenses under constant observation while planning for the final storming of the ridge.

== Aftermath ==
The eventual collapse of the Deve-boyun positions effectively nullified the Erzurum fortress's defensive value, as the Russian ability to penetrate the "inaccessible" high-altitude terrain, such as the Kargapazar ridge, allowed them to bypass the strongest fortifications and force the Ottoman defenders into an untenable position.
