= Deh-e Mir Jafar Khan =

Deh-e Mir Jafar Khan ده ميرجعفرخان
- Village
- Location within Iran
- Coordinates: 30°59′19″N 61°46′06″E
- Country: Iran
- Province: Sistan and Baluchestan
- County: Hirmand
- Bakhsh: Central
- Rural District: Jahanabad

Population (2006)
  - Total: 1,107
- Time zone: UTC+3:30 (IRST)
  - Summer (DST): UTC+4:30 (IRDT)

Deh-e Mir Jafar Khan (Persian: ده ميرجعفرخان, also Romanized as Deh-e Mīr Ja‘far Khān) is a village in Jahanabad Rural District, in the Central District of Hirmand County, Sistan and Baluchestan Province, Iran. At the 2006 census, its population was 1,107, in 233 families.
