= Kalb-Ali Khan Kangarlu =

Khan of Nakhchivan from 1787 to 1809

Khan of Nakhichevan
- In office 1787–1809
- Monarchs: Jafar Khan, Sayed Morad Khan, Lotf Ali Khan, Agha Mohammad Khan Qajar, Fath-Ali Shah Qajar
- Preceded by: Jafarqoli Khan
- Succeeded by: Abbasqoli Khan Kangarlu

Personal details
- Children: Ehsan Khan
- Parent: Heydar Qoli Khan Kangarli (father)
- Tribe: Kangarlu

Kalb-Ali Khan Kangarlu (Persian: کلبعلی خان کنگرلو) was the khan (governor) of the Nakhichevan Khanate from 1787 to 1809. Since the death of the Iranian king (shah) Nader Shah in 1747, Kalb-Ali's family—which was part of the Kangarlu tribe—had been in control of Nakhichevan. His father, Heydar Qoli Khan, was the one who had established control. The Kangarlu were a branch of the Turkoman Ustajlu tribe, which was part of the Qizilbash tribal confederacy.

Following the Treaty of Georgievsk in 1787 between the Russian Empire and the east Georgian kingdom of Kartli-Kakheti, Kalb-Ali tried to establish contact with Russia. This action angered the Qajar king of Iran, Agha Mohammad Khan (r. 1789–1797), who as a result had Kalb-Ali seized and taken to Tehran in 1796, where he was blinded. Another khan, Mohammad Khan Qajar of Erivan, had attempted the same, but his Qajar ancestry saved from the same punishment; he was instead put under house arrest. Following the assassination of Agha Mohammad Khan in 1797, Kalb-Ali went back to Nakhichevan, where he was appointed as its khan by Agha Mohammad Khan's successor, Fath-Ali Shah Qajar (r. 1797–1834). In return, Kalb-Ali supplied Fath-Ali Shah's army with soldiers from the Kangarlu tribe. In 1809, Prince Abbas Mirza annexed Nakhichevan and sent Kalb-Ali to Erivan. In Nakhichevan, he installed Kalb-Ali's sons, Nazar-Ali Beg and Abbas Qoli Agha as his deputies.

== Sources ==
- Bournoutian, George (2021). From the Kur to the Aras: A Military History of Russia's Move into the South Caucasus and the First Russo-Iranian War, 1801–1813. Brill. ISBN 978-9004445154.
- Oberling, P. (2010). "Kangarlu". In Yarshater, Ehsan (ed.). Encyclopædia Iranica. Vol. XV/5: Ḵamsa of Jamāli–Karim Devona. London and New York: Routledge & Kegan Paul. p. 495. ISBN 978-1-934283-28-8.
