= Ehsan Khan Nakhichevansky =

Khan of Nakhchivan in 1828

Ehsan Khan Kengerli (Azerbaijani: إحسان خان کنگرلی), later known by his Russified name of Ehsan Khan Nakhichevansky (Russian: Эхсан Хан Нахичеванский, Azerbaijani: إحسان خان ناخچیوانسکی; 1789–1846) was the last ruler of the Nakhichevan Khanate.

== Biography ==
Ehsan Khan hailed from the Turkic tribe of Kangarlu, and was the youngest son of Kalb-Ali Khan Kangarlu, the ruler of the Nakhichevan Khanate, who was blinded by Agha Mohammad Khan Qajar.

In his youth, Ehsan Khan was on Persian service and later took part in Ottoman–Persian War. During the Russo-Persian War of 1826–1828, Abbas Mirza appointed Ehsan Khan as commander of the fortress Abbasabad. After the Russians laid siege to the fortress, Ehsan Khan secretly arranged for the gates of the fortress to be opened to the Russian commander General Ivan Paskevich.

For his services, Ehsan was conferred the rank of colonel and appointed the ruler of the Nakhichevan Khanate. The khanate was formally abolished in 1828, but Ehsan Khan retained his influence in the region and was appointed the campaign ataman of Transcaucasian Muslim troops. In 1831 he was decorated with 2nd class Order of Saint Anna, and in 1837 he was conferred the rank of major-general in the Russian army.

After the dissolution of the khanate, the khans of Nakhichevan took the Russified surname Nakhchivanski, and the men of its family traditionally joined the Russian military service. Two sons of Ehsan khan - Ismail khan and Kalbali khan - were generals in the Russian army and were awarded orders of Saint-George IV degree for their actions in battle. A son of Kalbali khan, Huseyn Khan Nakhichevanski, was a prominent Russian military commander and adjutant general of the Russian Emperor, and his nephews, Jamshid Khan and Kalbali, were generals in the Soviet and Iranian armies respectively. His great-great-grandson Jafargulu Khan Nakhchivanski initiated an Azeri revolt, leading to the proclamation of the independence of the Republic of Aras, composed of the former uyezds of Nakhchivan, Sharur-Daralagez and Surmali, with its capital in the city of Nakhchivan. His daughter Gonchabegüm Nakhchivanski was a poet.
