= Heydar Qoli Khan =

Khan of Nakhichevan from 1747 to before 1762

Heydar Qoli Khan Kangarlu

Khan of Nakhichevan
- In office 1747 – before 1762
- Succeeded by: Haji Khan Kangarli

Personal details
- Tribe: Kangarlu

Heydar Qoli Khan (Persian: حیدرقلی خان کنگرلی) was the first khan of the Nakhichevan Khanate, ruling from 1747 to 1762 under Iranian suzerainty.

He belonged to the Kangarlu tribe, a branch of the Turkoman Ustajlu tribe, which was part of the Qizilbash tribal confederacy. Nakhichevan is both the name of a city and historical region located in the Armenian highlands in the South Caucasus. In Safavid Iran (1501–1736), it was an administrative jurisdiction of the Erivan Province (also known as Chokhur-e Sa'd). Since the second half of the 17th-century, members of the Kangarlu had held the governorship of Nakhchivan. In 1747, following the death of the Afsharid shah (king) of Iran, Nader Shah, Heydar Qoli Khan established the Nakhichevan Khanate.

Before 1762, Heydar Qoli Khan was succeeded by Hajji Khan Kangarlu as the khan of Nakhichevan.

== Sources ==
- Bournoutian, George (2021). From the Kur to the Aras: A Military History of Russia's Move into the South Caucasus and the First Russo-Iranian War, 1801–1813. Brill. ISBN 978-9004445154.
- Floor, Willem (2008). Titles and Emoluments in Safavid Iran: A Third Manual of Safavid Administration, by Mirza Naqi Nasiri. Washington, D.C.: Mage Publishers. ISBN 978-1933823232.
- Oberling, P. (2010). "Kangarlu". In Yarshater, Ehsan (ed.). Encyclopædia Iranica. Vol. XV/5: Ḵamsa of Jamāli–Karim Devona. London and New York: Routledge & Kegan Paul. p. 495. ISBN 978-1-934283-28-8.
- Sinclair, Thomas A. (2014). "Armenia (topography)". In Fleet, Kate; Krämer, Gudrun; Matringe, Denis; Nawas, John; Rowson, Everett (eds.). Encyclopaedia of Islam (3rd ed.). Brill Online. ISSN 1873-9830.
- Tsibenko, Veronika (2021). "Nakhchivan". In Fleet, Kate; Krämer, Gudrun; Matringe, Denis; Nawas, John; Rowson, Everett (eds.). Encyclopaedia of Islam (3rd ed.). Brill Online. ISSN 1873-9830.
