= Kangarlu (tribe) =

Turkic tribe in Iran

Kangarlu (Persian: کنگرلو) is a Turkic tribe that resides in the Azerbaijan and Qom-Varamin regions of Iran. They were originally a clan of the prominent Ustajlu tribe of the Qizilbash tribal confederacy.

== History ==
A Turkic tribe, the Kangarlu were originally a clan of the prominent Ustajlu tribe of the Qizilbash tribal confederacy. One branch of the semi-nomadic Turkic Pechenegs was called "Kangar", but it appears that they had no connection to the Kangarlu tribe. The Kangarlu tribe produced several prominent figures in Safavid Iran (1501–1736). In 1526/27, Ahmad Soltan Kangarlu served as governor of Varamin and Shahrivar. In the 1530s and 1540s, while serving as governor of Astarabad, Sadr-al-Din Khan Kangarlu contributed to the defeat of two Uzbek assaults. Mostafa Beg Kangarlu, who served as the governor of Tun and Tabas in the early 1590s, was another Kangarlu chieftain who fought against the Uzbeks. His little group of Ustajlu warriors held off an invasion of Uzbek warriors for two years, until he was eventually captured and put to death in 1593/94. On his list of the greatest commanders during the reign of Shah Abbas I (r. 1588–1629), the Safavid-era historian Iskandar Beg Munshi included Maqsud Sultan Kangarlu. The latter was appointed governor of Nakhchivan in the Caucasus, shortly after the Safavid conquest of Yerevan in June 1604. Until the collapse of the Safavid government, Nakhchivan was under the administrative jurisdiction of the Erivan Province (also known as Chokhur-e Sa'd).

When Ottoman soldiers attacked the region later that year, Maqsud Sultan Kangarlu was ordered by Shah Abbas I to evacuate the entire area—including the Armenian community in the city of Julfa—to Qaradagh and Dizmar. The Armenians were sent to Isfahan the following year. Around 1500, when the Ustajlu migrated into the Azerbaijan region, a large number of Kangarlu tribesmen settled north of the Aras River. In 1747, a member of the Kangarlu tribe, Heydar Qoli Khan, established the Nakhichevan Khanate under Iranian suzerainty. In 1809, the Qajar prince of Iran, Abbas Mirza annexed Nakhchivan and sent its ruling Kangarlu khan Kalb-Ali Khan Kangarlu to Yerevan. He installed Kalb-Ali's sons, Nazar-Ali Beg and Abbas Qoli Agha as his deputies in Nakhchivan. J. M. Jouannin, writing in 1819, mentioned the Kangarlu as "a small tribe established in Persian Armenia, on the shores of the Aras, and numbering up to four or five thousand individuals." In 1828, Qajar Iran ceded Nakhchivan to the Russian Empire as agreed in the Treaty of Turkmenchay. M. H. Valili Baharlu reported in 1921 that the Kangarlu were present in the areas of Geokchay, Jevanshir, and Shusha. A considerable number among the Kangarlu that lived north of the Aras were descended from Kangarlu individuals who, in 1604, were compelled to migrate south of the Aras River under the orders of Shah Abbas I. Later, when Shah Abbas II (r. 1642–1666) sought to repopulate the frontier regions of his realm, these individuals were granted permission to return to their original pastures.

== Numbers and descendants ==
Kangarlu is also the name of a clan of the Haji Alilu tribe that still exists in Qaradagh. It had about twenty-five households in 1960. In the same region, 24 kilometers to the north of Meshginshahr, lies a settlement known as Kangarlu. Most likely, the group living there are the descendants of Kangarlu who were relocated to Qaradagh in 1604 and stayed there. The West Azerbaijan province is home to several Kangarlu settlers as well. There is still a settlement called Kangarlu between Salmas and Khoy, where one clan that Maftun Donbul and Valili Baharlu mentioned lived. There is also another village named Kangarlu to the east of Bostanabad, where it appears that another Kangarlu group once resided. When these two groups relocated to the western part of Azerbaijan remains unknown.

The Qom-Varamin region in central Iran is home to a group of Kangarlu people. Jouannin reported that they numbered around 1,000 individuals in 1809. M. L. Sheil wrote in 1849 about a group of Kangarlu who were residing in 1,000 "tents and houses" alongside a group of Arabs from Damavand and a group of the Qara Chorlu. However, S. I. Bruk claimed in the late 1950s that there were 30,000 Kangarlu people there, "a figure which seems somewhat excessive" according to Pierre Oberling. These Kangarlu may have lived in that area since Ahmad Soltan Kangarlu's time as its governor in the 1520s.

== See also ==
- Kangarli cavalry, a military unit

== Sources ==
- Bournoutian, George (2021). From the Kur to the Aras: A Military History of Russia's Move into the South Caucasus and the First Russo-Iranian War, 1801–1813. Brill. ISBN 978-9004445154.
- Floor, Willem (2008). Titles and Emoluments in Safavid Iran: A Third Manual of Safavid Administration, by Mirza Naqi Nasiri. Washington, D.C.: Mage Publishers. ISBN 978-1933823232.
- Oberling, P. (2010). "Kangarlu". In Yarshater, Ehsan (ed.). Encyclopædia Iranica. Vol. XV/5: Ḵamsa of Jamāli–Karim Devona. London and New York: Routledge & Kegan Paul. p. 495. ISBN 978-1-934283-28-8.
- Tsibenko, Veronika (2021). "Nakhchivan". In Fleet, Kate; Krämer, Gudrun; Matringe, Denis; Nawas, John; Rowson, Everett (eds.). Encyclopaedia of Islam (3rd ed.). Brill Online. ISSN 1873-9830.
