= Nakhichevan Khanate =

1747–1828 khanate under Iranian suzerainty

Coordinates: 39.2000°N 45.5000°E

- 1747–1828
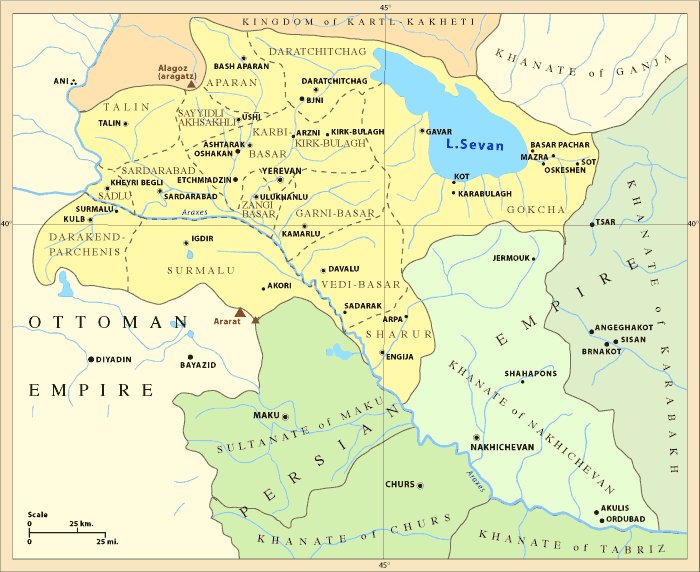
- The Nakhichevan and Erivan khanates in c. 1800
- Status: Khanate; Under Iranian suzerainty
- Capital: Nakhichevan
- Common languages: Persian (official); Azerbaijani; Armenian; Kurdish
- History
  - Established: 1747
  - Disestablished: 1828
Preceded by	Succeeded by
Afsharid Iran	Armenian Oblast
- Today part of: Armenia; Azerbaijan

The Nakhichevan Khanate (Persian: خانات نخجوان, romanized: Khānāt-e Nakhjavān) was a khanate under Iranian suzerainty, which controlled the city of Nakhichevan and its surroundings from 1747 to 1828. It was established by Heydar Qoli Khan after death of Nader Shah and was abolished following Treaty of Turkmenchay.

The territory of the khanate corresponded to most of the present-day Nakhchivan Autonomous Republic and Vayots Dzor Province of present-day Armenia.

== History ==
Nakhichevan is both the name of a city and historical region located in the Armenian highlands in the South Caucasus. Until the demise of Safavid Iran, Nakhichevan was under the administrative jurisdiction of the Erivan Province (also known as Chokhur-e Sa'd). Shortly after the recapture of Yerevan in 1604 during the Ottoman–Safavid War of 1603–1618, then incumbent king (shah) Abbas I (r. 1588–1620) appointed as its new governor Cheragh Sultan Ustajlu, who, after his brief tenure, was succeeded by Maqsud Sultan. Maqsud Sultan was a military commander who hailed from the Kangarlu branch of the Ustajlu tribe, the latter being one of the original Qizilbash tribes that had supplied power to the Safavids since its earliest days.

The Kangarlu were described by J. M. Jouannin as “a small tribe established in Persian Armenia on the shores of the Aras". Later that year, as Ottoman forces threatened the area during the same war, Shah Abbas ordered Maqsud Sultan to evacuate the entire population of the Nakhichevan region (including the Armenians of Julfa, who, in the following year, were transplanted to Isfahan, Qaraja Dag (Arasbaran) and Dezmar. Persian rule was interrupted by Ottoman occupation in 1635–1636 and 1722–1736. It officially became a fully functioning khanate under the Afsharid dynasty. Initially, the territory of Nakhichevan was part of the Erivan Khanate, but later came to be ruled by a separate khan.

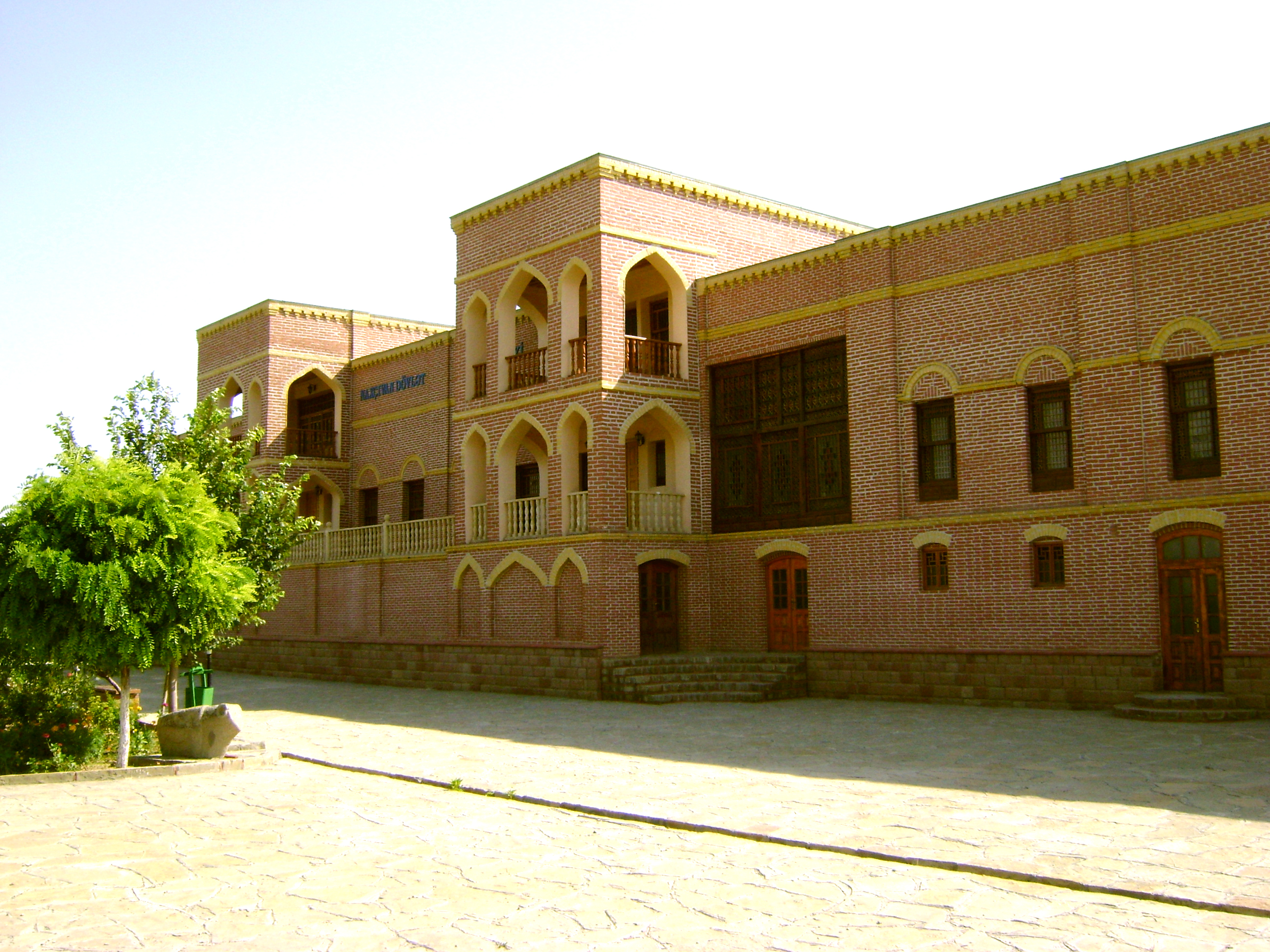
The palace of the khans of Nakhichevan

Following the Treaty of Georgievsk in 1783 between the Russian Empire and the east Georgian kingdom of Kartli-Kakheti, Kalb-Ali tried to establish contact with Russia. This action angered the Qajar king of Iran, Agha Mohammad Khan (r. 1789–1797), who as a result had Kalb-Ali seized and taken to Tehran in 1796, where he was blinded. Another khan, Mohammad Khan Qajar of Erivan, had attempted the same, but his Qajar ancestry saved him from the same punishment; he was instead put under house arrest. Following the assassination of Agha Mohammad Khan in 1797, Kalb-Ali went back to Nakhichevan, where he was appointed as its khan by Agha Mohammad Khan's successor, Fath-Ali Shah Qajar (r. 1797–1834). In return, Kalb-Ali supplied Fath-Ali Shah's army with soldiers from the Kangarlu tribe. In 1809, Prince Abbas Mirza annexed Nakhichevan and sent Kalb-Ali to Erivan. In Nakhichevan, he installed Kalb-Ali's sons, Nazar-Ali Beg and Abbas Qoli Agha, as his deputies.

In 1808, during the Russo-Persian War of 1804–1813, Russian forces under general Gudovich briefly occupied Nakhichevan, but as a result of the Treaty of Gulistan, it was returned to Persian control.

In 1827, during the Russo-Persian War of 1826–1828, Abbas Mirza appointed Ehsan Khan Kangarlu as commander of Abbasabad, a fortress of strategic importance for the defense of the Nakhichevan Khanate. After heavy losses in an attempt to take the fortress by escalade on July 14, the Russians mounted a siege. Ehsan Khan secretly contacted the Russian commander, General Paskevich, and opened the gates of the fortress to him on 22 July 1827. With the Treaty of Turkmenchay, in 1828 the khanate became a Russian possession and Ehsan Khan was rewarded with the governorship, conferred the rank of major-general of the Russian army and the title of campaign ataman of the Kangarlu militia.

== Population ==
Demographics of the Nakhichevan Khanate in 1826
Group	Families	Males	Females	Total
Iranian elite/army	Unknown	Unknown	Unknown	3,000
Turks and Kurds (settled, semi-settled, and nomadic)	3,863	9,033	8,105	17,138
Armenians	530	1,404	1,286	2,690
Total	22,828			

== Administration ==
Administrative map of the Nakhichevan Khanate in 1828.

It appears that Nakhichevan had a much higher proportion of private property than Erivan because it was less centrally organized, which allowed the illegal conversion of state lands into private property. This was caused by the lack of state lands in Nakhichevan.

== Taxes ==
Every adult male over the age of fifteen living in a city had paid an income or head tax, known as the bash-puli ("head money") in Nakhichevan. Despite Nader Shah's removal of the poll tax paid by Eastern Armenian Christians at Catholicos Abrahim III's request in 1736, Armenians (including in Nakhichevan) often paid more taxes than Muslims did.

On Nowruz and other holidays, the khan and senior administrators received taxes in the form of presents. These were initially given as gifts but quickly transitioned to formal taxes and were commonly sought as bribes or tribute. These types of gifts were known as pishkesh, salamane and bairamlik / nowruzi / eydi.

== Coinage ==
The coins minted in the Nakhichevan Khanate were in the abbasi currency and equal to that of the coins minted by Karim Khan Zand, with the verse shod and the exclamation ya Karim on them. There are only a dozen of these extremely rare coins in existence, being minted between 1766–1777. Compared to Iranian coins that weigh a mithqal, these Nakhichevan coins are a little lighter. The few coins produced reveal their supposedly philanthropic and non-economic purposes.

== Sources ==
- Akopyan, Alexander; Petrov, Pavel (2016). "The Coinage of Īrawān, Nakhjawān, Ganja and Qarabāḡ Khānates in 1747–1827". State Hermitage: 1–9.
- Behrooz, Maziar (2023). Iran at War: Interactions with the Modern World and the Struggle with Imperial Russia. I.B. Tauris. ISBN 978-0755637379.
- Bournoutian, George (1976). The Khanate of Erevan Under Qajar Rule: 1795–1828. University of California. ISBN 978-0939214181.
- Bournoutian, George (1980). The Population of Persian Armenia Prior to and Immediately Following its Annexation to the Russian Empire: 1826–1832. The Wilson Center, Kennan Institute for Advanced Russian Studies.
- Bournoutian, George (1982). Eastern Armenia in the Last Decades of Persian Rule 1807–1828: A Political and Socioeconomic Study of the Khanate of Erevan on the Eve of the Russian Conquest. Undena Publications. ISBN 978-0890031223.
- Bournoutian, George (1997). "Eastern Armenia from the Seventeenth Century to the Russian Annexation". In Hovannisian, Richard G. (ed.). The Armenian People from Ancient to Modern Times. Vol. 1. St. Martin's Press. pp. 81–107. ISBN 0-312-10169-4.
- Bournoutian, George (2016a). The 1820 Russian Survey of the Khanate of Shirvan: A Primary Source on the Demography and Economy of an Iranian Province prior to its Annexation by Russia. Gibb Memorial Trust. ISBN 978-1909724808.
- Bournoutian, George (2016b). "Prelude to War: The Russian Siege and Storming of the Fortress of Ganjeh, 1803–4". Iranian Studies. 50 (1). Taylor & Francis: 107–124. doi:10.1080/00210862.2016.1159779. S2CID 163302882.
- Bournoutian, George (2018). Armenia and Imperial Decline: The Yerevan Province, 1900–1914. Milton Park, Abingdon, Oxon: Routledge. ISBN 978-1-351-06260-2. OCLC 1037283914.
- Bournoutian, George (2021). From the Kur to the Aras: A Military History of Russia's Move into the South Caucasus and the First Russo-Iranian War, 1801–1813. Brill. ISBN 978-9004445154.
- Broers, Laurence (2019). Armenia and Azerbaijan: Anatomy of a Rivalry. Edinburgh University Press. ISBN 978-1474450522.
- Floor, Willem (2008). Titles and Emoluments in Safavid Iran: A Third Manual of Safavid Administration, by Mirza Naqi Nasiri. Washington, D.C.: Mage Publishers. ISBN 978-1933823232.
- Floor, Willem (2018). "Tribal Resurgence in the Eighteenth Century: A Useful Label?". In Axworthy, Michael (ed.). Crisis, Collapse, Militarism and Civil War: The History and Historiography of 18th Century Iran. Oxford University Press. pp. 151–162. ISBN 978-0190250331.
- Floor, Willem (2021). "The Safavid court and government". In Matthee, Rudi (ed.). The Safavid World. Routledge. pp. 203–224.
- Fowkes, B. (2002). Ethnicity and Ethnic Conflict in the Post-Communist World. Springer. ISBN 978-0333792568.
- Hambly, Gavin R. G. (1991a). "Āghā Muhammad Khān and the establishment of the Qājār dynasty". In Avery, Peter; Hambly, Gavin R. G.; Melville, Charles Peter (eds.). The Cambridge History of Iran: From Nadir Shah to the Islamic Republic. Vol. 7. Cambridge: Cambridge University Press. pp. 104–143. ISBN 0-521-20095-4.
- Hambly, Gavin R. G. (1991b). "Iran during the reigns of Fath 'Alī Shāh and Muhammad Shāh". In Avery, Peter; Hambly, Gavin R. G.; Melville, Charles Peter (eds.). The Cambridge History of Iran: From Nadir Shah to the Islamic Republic. Vol. 7. Cambridge: Cambridge University Press. pp. 144–173. ISBN 0-521-20095-4.
- Hewsen, Robert (1972). The Meliks Of Eastern Armenia I. Revue des Études Arménie.
- Kazemzadeh, F. (1991). "Iranian relations with Russia and the Soviet Union, to 1921". In Avery, Peter; Hambly, Gavin R. G.; Melville, Charles Peter (eds.). The Cambridge History of Iran: From Nadir Shah to the Islamic Republic. Vol. 7. Cambridge: Cambridge University Press. pp. 314–350. ISBN 0-521-20095-4.
- Matthee, Rudi (2008). "Safavid dynasty". Encyclopaedia Iranica.
- Matthee, Rudi (2011). Persia in Crisis: Safavid Decline and the Fall of Isfahan. I.B.Tauris. ISBN 978-0857731814.
- Matthee, Rudi; Floor, Willem; Clawson, Patrick (2013). The Monetary History of Iran: From the Safavids to the Qajars. I.B.Tauris. ISBN 978-0857721723.
- Oberling, P. (2010). "Kangarlu". In Yarshater, Ehsan (ed.). Encyclopædia Iranica. Vol. XV/5: Ḵamsa of Jamāli–Karim Devona. London and New York: Routledge & Kegan Paul. p. 495. ISBN 978-1-934283-28-8.
- Perry, John R. (1979). Karim Khan Zand: A History of Iran, 1747-1779. University of Chicago Press. ISBN 978-0226660981.
- Reid, James J. (1978). "The Qajar Uymaq in the Safavid Period, 1500-1722". Iranian Studies. 11 (1/4). Taylor & Francis: 117–143. doi:10.1080/00210867808701542. JSTOR 4310299. (registration required)
- Swietochowski, Tadeusz (2004). Russian Azerbaijan, 1905–1920: The Shaping of a National Identity in a Muslim Community. Cambridge University Press. ISBN 978-0521522458.
- Sinclair, Thomas A. (2014). "Armenia (topography)". In Fleet, Kate; Krämer, Gudrun; Matringe, Denis; Nawas, John; Rowson, Everett (eds.). Encyclopaedia of Islam (3rd ed.). Brill Online. ISSN 1873-9830.
- Tsibenko, Veronika (2021). "Nakhchivan". In Fleet, Kate; Krämer, Gudrun; Matringe, Denis; Nawas, John; Rowson, Everett (eds.). Encyclopaedia of Islam (3rd ed.). Brill Online. ISSN 1873-9830.
- Yilmaz, Harun (2015). "A Family Quarrel: Azerbaijani Historians against Soviet Iranologists". Iranian Studies. 48 (5). Cambridge University Press: 769–783. doi:10.1080/00210862.2015.1058642. S2CID 142718875.
