= Aghayev =

Aghayev (masculine, Azerbaijani: Ağayev) or Aghayeva (feminine, Azerbaijani: Ağayeva) is a surname of Azerbaijani origin. Notable people with the surname include:

- Akbar Aghayev (1919–1944), Soviet soldier killed in the Holocaust
- Aliyar Aghayev, Azerbaijani football referee
- Hasan bey Aghayev (1875–1920), Azerbaijani physician and politician
- Nasimi Aghayev, Azerbaijani diplomat
- Ogtay Aghayev (1935–2006), Azerbaijani Soviet singer and actor
- Rafael Aghayev (born 1985), Azerbaijani karateka
- Salahat Aghayev (born 1991), Azerbaijani footballer

== See also ==
- Agayev
