= Anjumani-shuara =

Anjumani-shuara (Persian - "Poets council") was a literary council of the 19th century in Azerbaijan. It was first held by Sheykhali khan Kangarli in 1831 in Ordubad. From 1870 to 1880 the council was led by Haji agha Fagir Ordubadi. Later this mission was obliged to Mohammad Taghi Sidgi. The council's activity operated with different intervals and there were many well-known writers and poets. After the death of Fagir and shifting of Sidgi in Nakhchivan the council was weakened and suspended its activities in 1890–1895.
