= Geysariyye Monument =

Historical monument in Ordubad, Nakhchivan Autonomous Republic

Geysariyye monument
- Azerbaijani: Qeysəriyyə abidəsi Persian: قیصریه
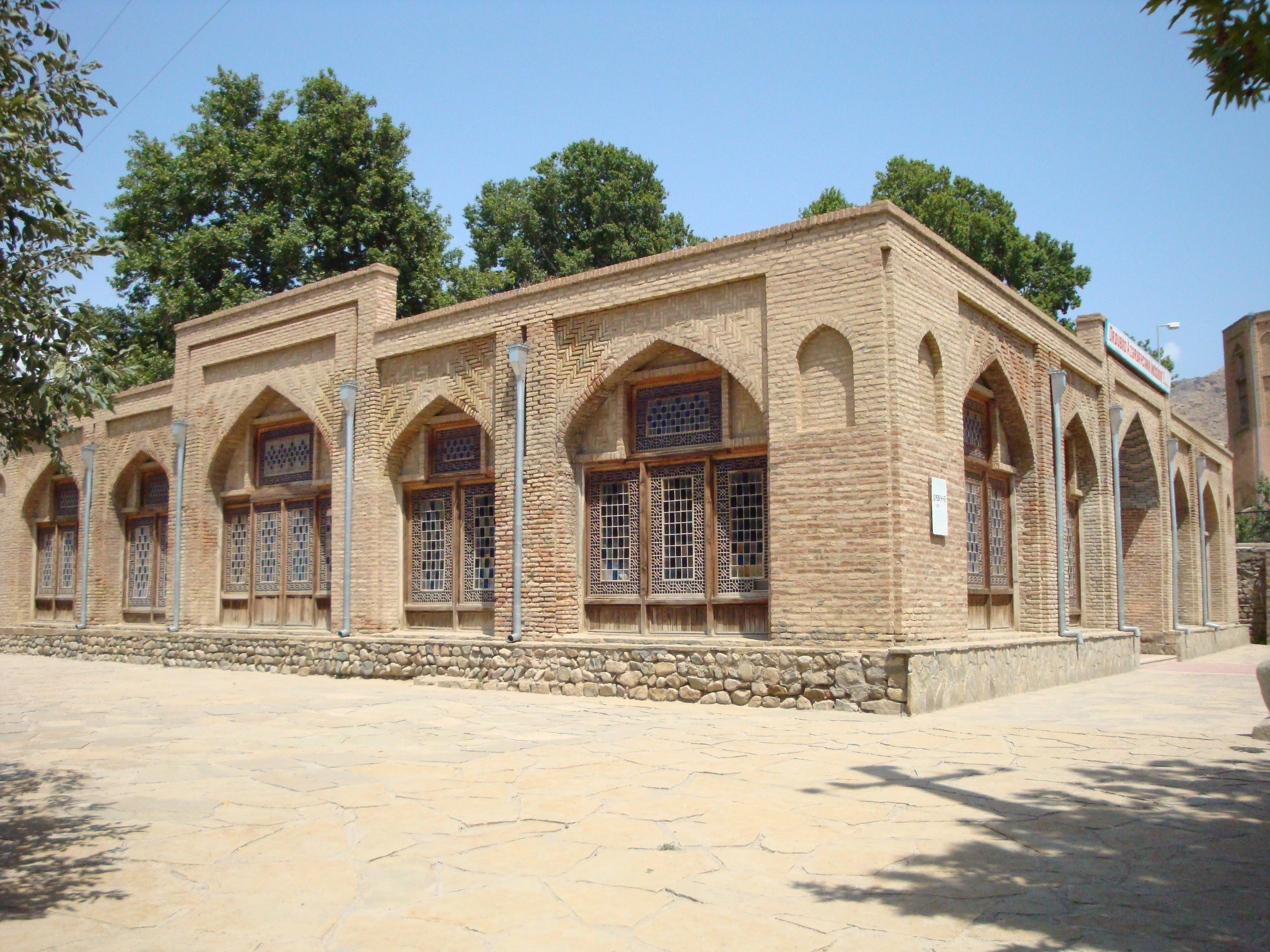
- Geysariyye monument before restoration
- Interactive map of the Geysariyye monument area

General information
- Location: Ordubad, Nakhchivan Autonomous Republic, Azerbaijan
- Completed: XVII century

The Geysariyye Monument is a historical and architectural monument of the 17th century located in Ordubad, Nakhchivan Autonomous Republic. Situated at market square, the city center of Ordubad, it is one of the Turco-Islamic monuments of Nakhchivan. Total area of Geysariyye is 540 m². It consists of a large dome and 16 small dome adjacent to it. The monument is made of baked bricks with a height of 8.5 meters. The windows of the historic building were developed with network method.

== History ==
The word "Geysariyye" (قیصریه) in Persian means a covered Oriental market built for the purpose of selling old-timbered jewels and jewels. Such buildings can be found in three parts of the world - Samarkand, Lar, Tabriz, Ordubad, etc. Mainly gold jewelry was sold here. Some belongings of the shahs, such as jewels, red precious stones were also put on sale here. Therefore, this monument was also called “Bazar of Shah”.

Shah Abbas of Persia once built the building for his wife. The purpose of the building was the sale of gold and jewelry belonging to Shah Abbas.

During the period of activity as zurkhaneh, the wrestlers from Iran (Specially Hamadan), Turkey and other places tried their strength here. Whoever won, would take a handful of gold from the khan who was sitting in the cells. Nearly the middle of the 19th century, the members of the literary assembly "Ancumani-shuara", founded in Ordubad, gathered in this building and read their writings and literary discussions. In the twentieth century, the monument operated as a silk-wing workshop, and was restored in 1978 by architect Zakir Babayev. In accordance to the order of the Chairman of the Supreme Assembly of Nakhchivan Autonomous Republic, restoration works were conducted in Geysariyye in 2010.

Since 1991, History-Ethnography Museum of Ordubad district operates in this building. On January 14, 2011, the historic Monument of Geysariyye was inaugurated after restoration. The roof of the building was repaired, the network system and the internal walls were restored. Interior of the building was decorated with bricks, stock offices, and offices for museum staff were opened and an illumination system fitting the exposition hall was installed.

== Exhibits ==
Art exhibits of ancient times, including silkworks, are exhibited in the museum. More than 4,000 exhibits have been preserved in the museum, which began functioning with 150 exhibits. In 2016, the museum had more than 30 new exhibits of XIV-XV century weapons, copper containers and historical literature. There are some iron tools in the museum. According to the elderly residents of the district, two different iron tools were hanged on the doors of the houses in Ordubad in the XVII century. While knocking the door with one of them, I was obvious that a woman was knocking the door. The woman of the house was opening the door. While knocking at the door with another tool, it was known that it was a male.

Gamigaya granite stones belonging to II-I millennium BC are the oldest exhibits in the museum. There are also 32 handwritten copies of the Qur'an preserved here. Ordubad Museum also features a chest with bell. A rich man from Ordubad named Arbub, brought it from France to keep his precious belongings. The chest is 347 kilograms. There are also safes to store gold. The bells are intended to prevent theft of the chest.

== Gallery ==
Before restoration

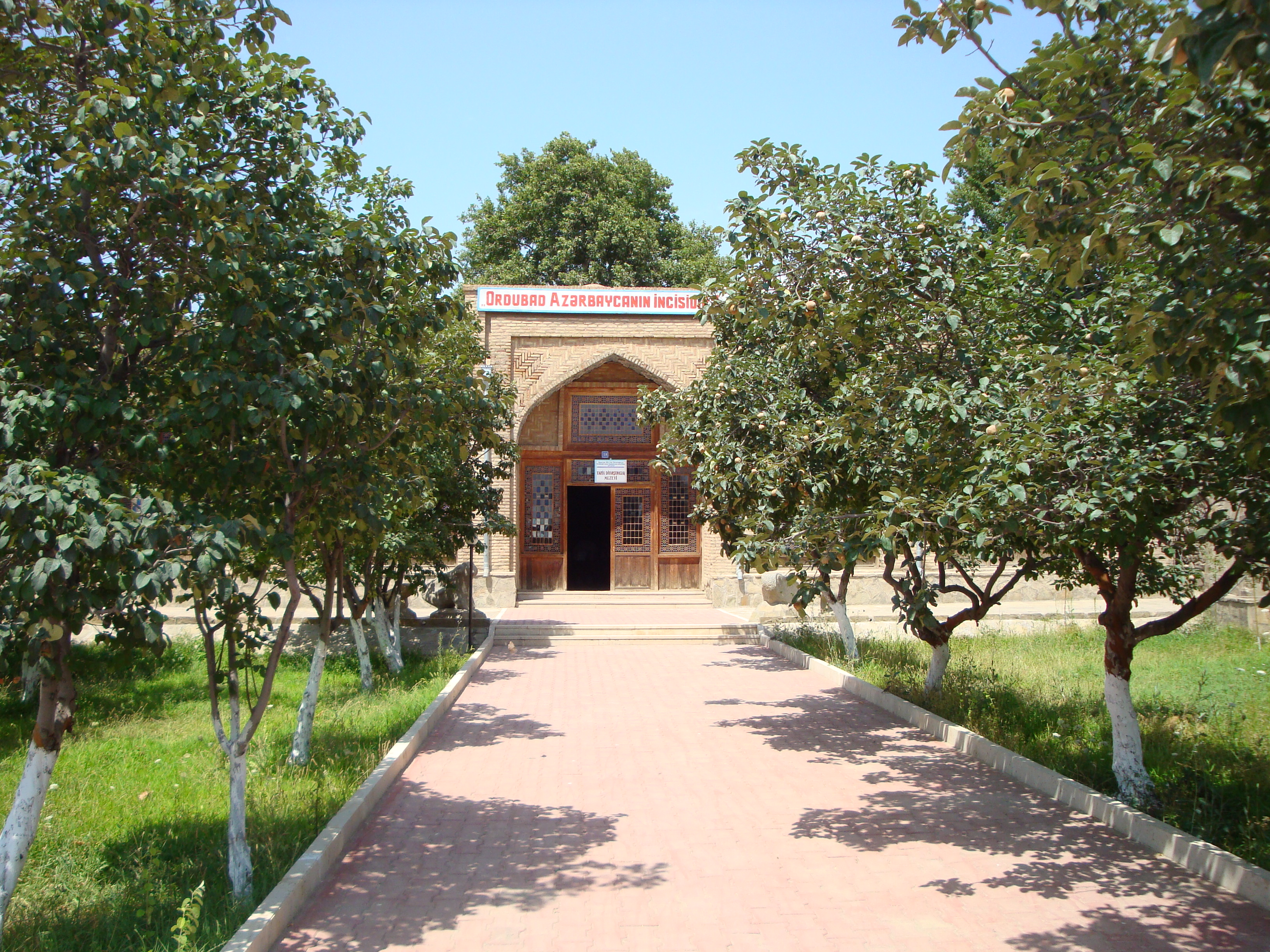

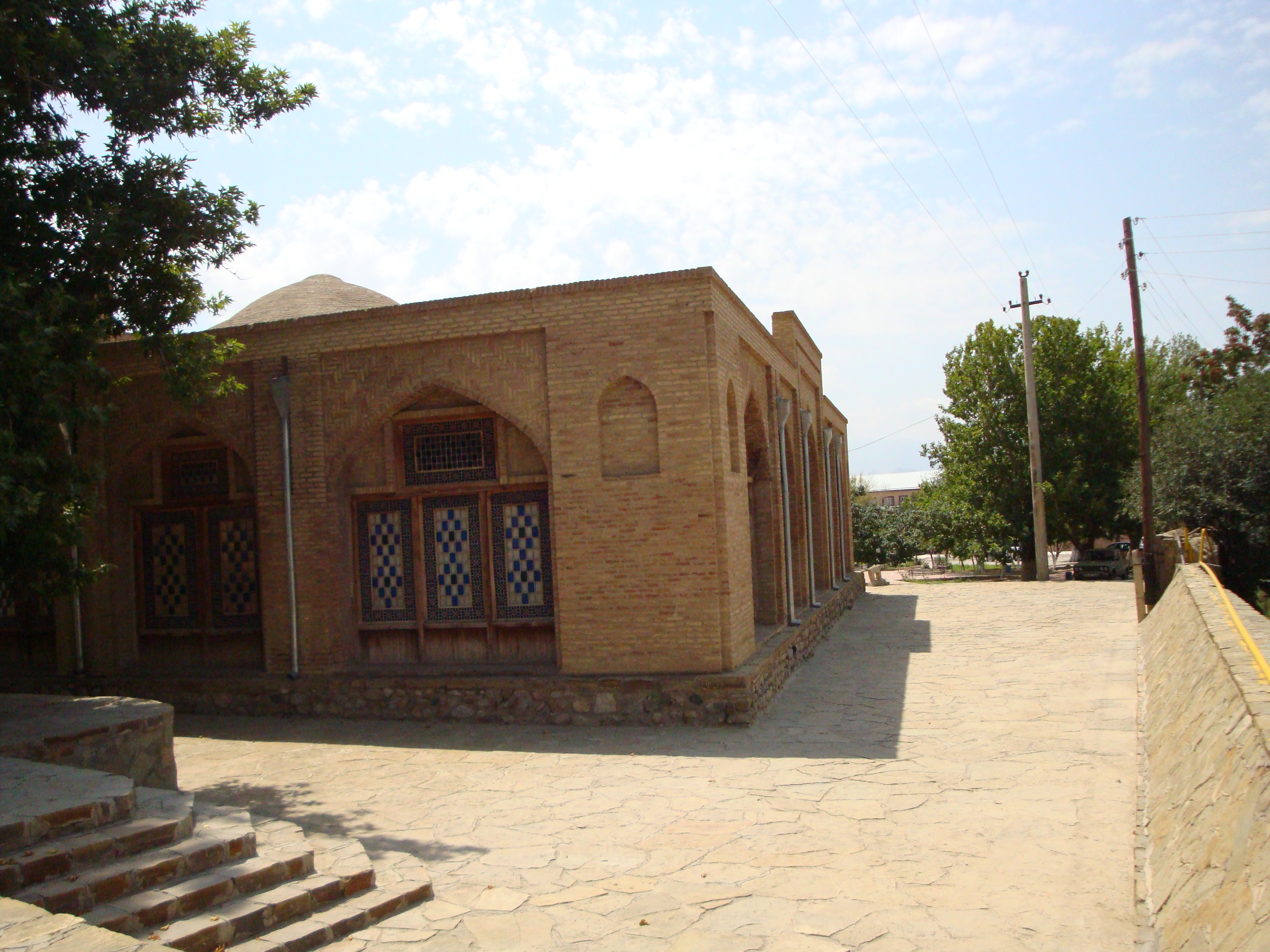

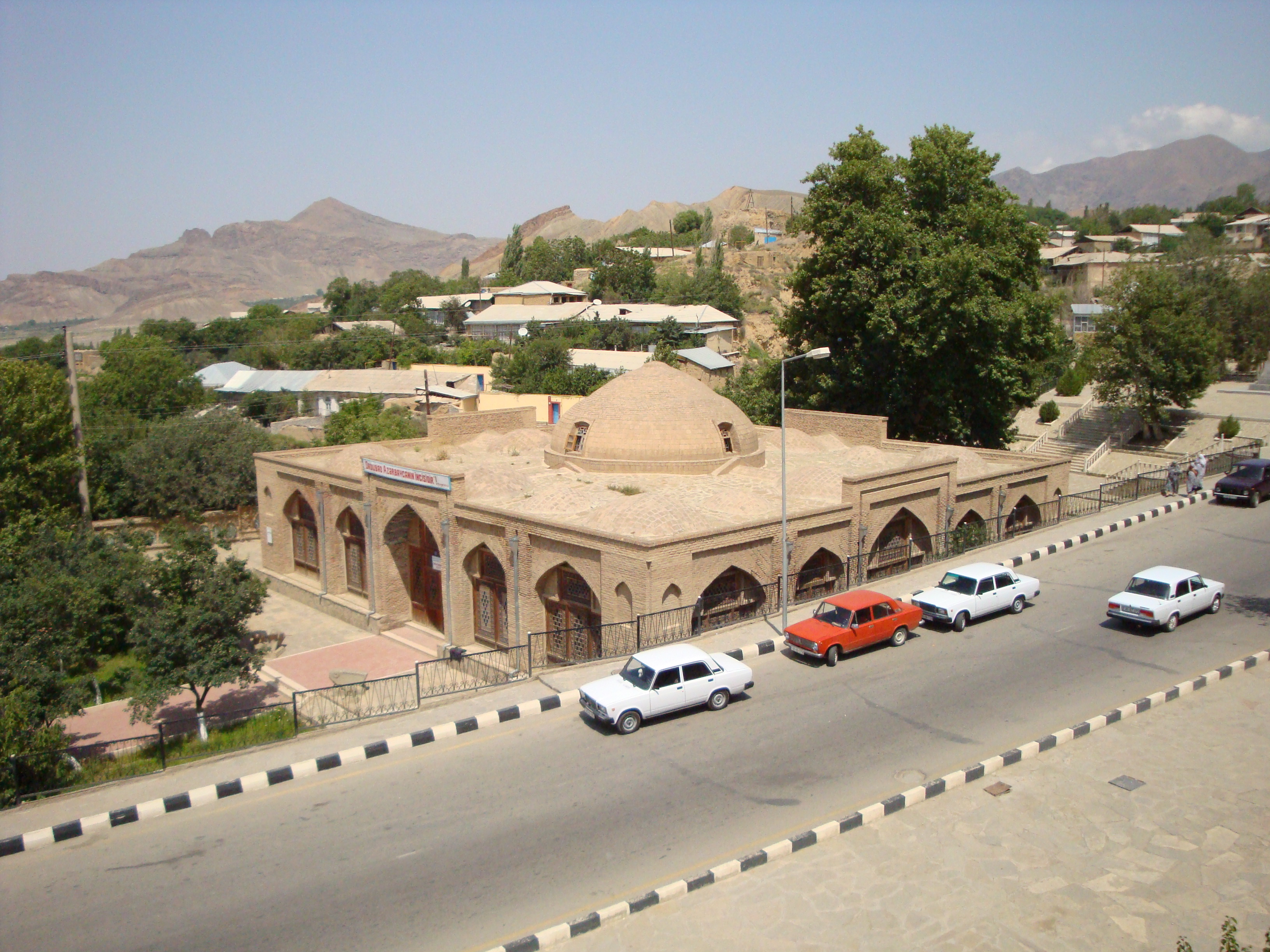
After restoration

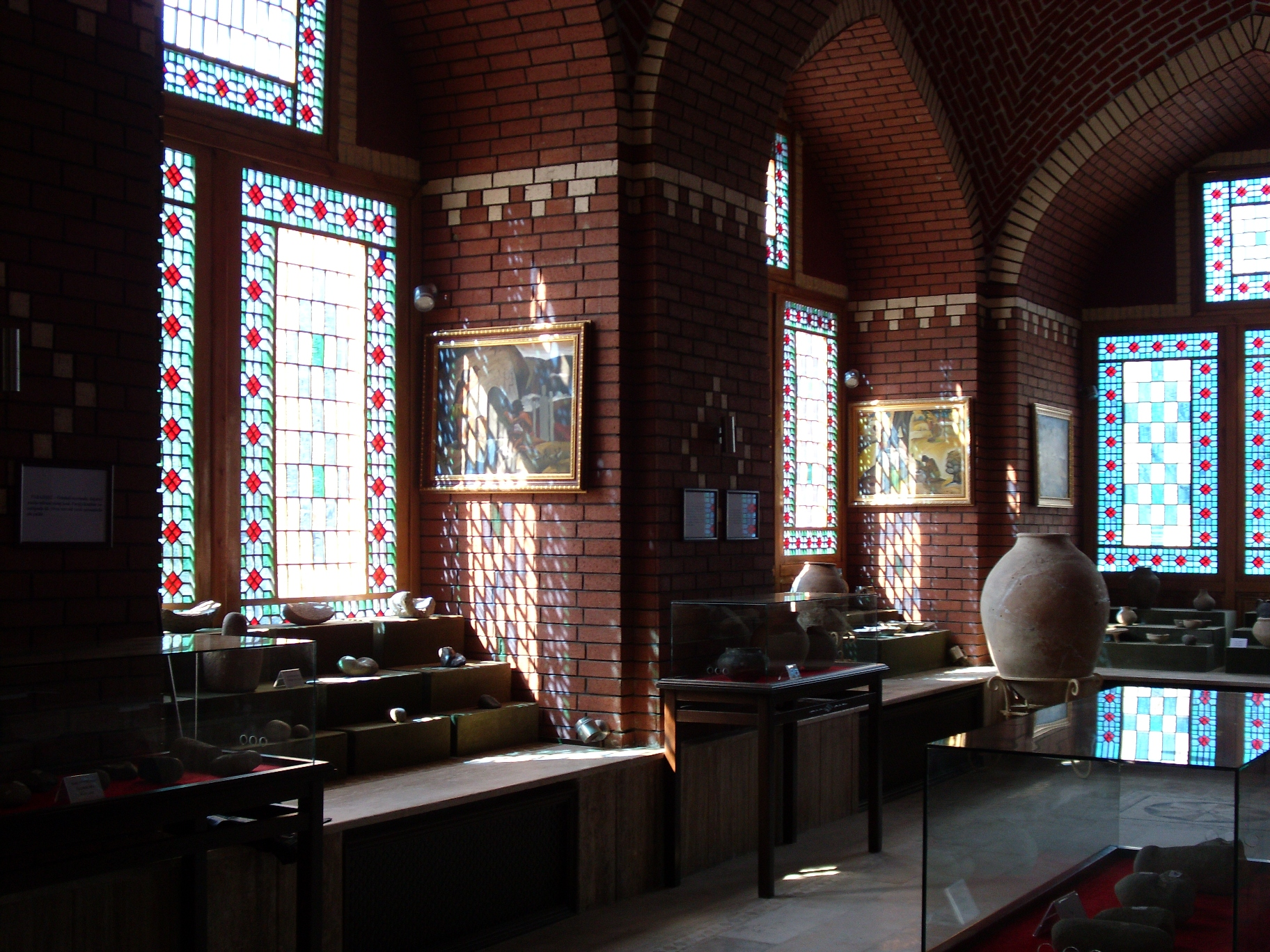

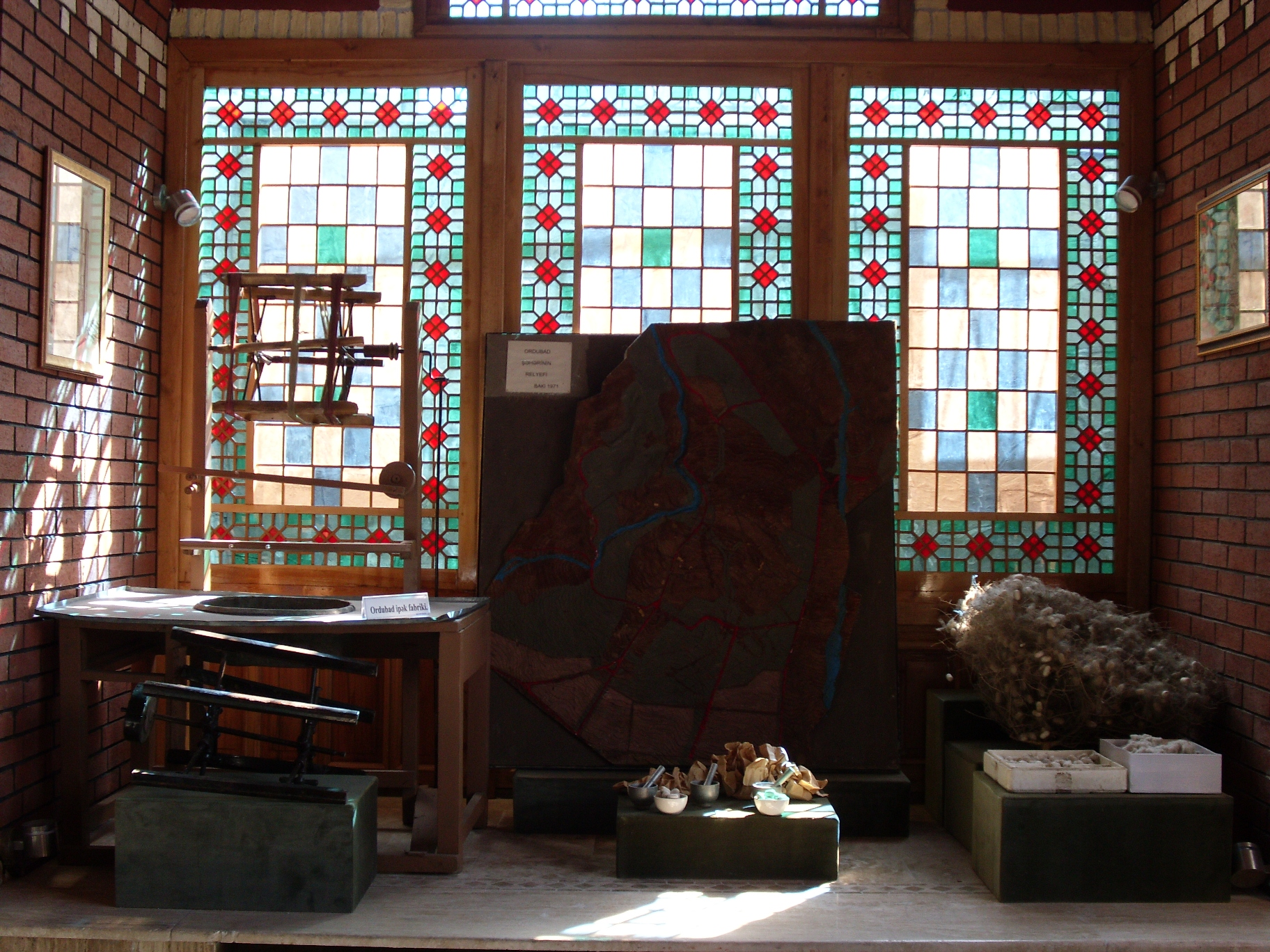

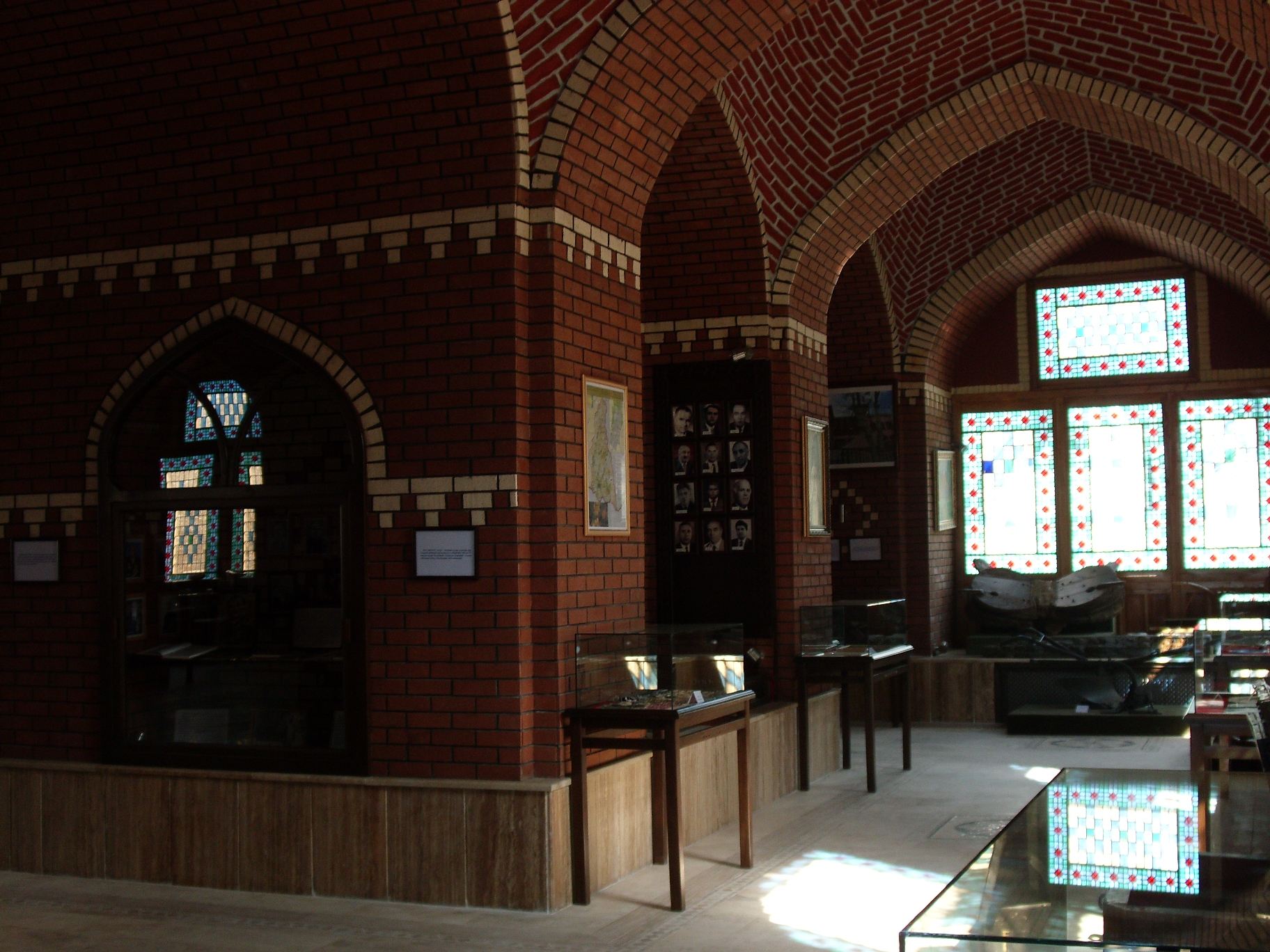

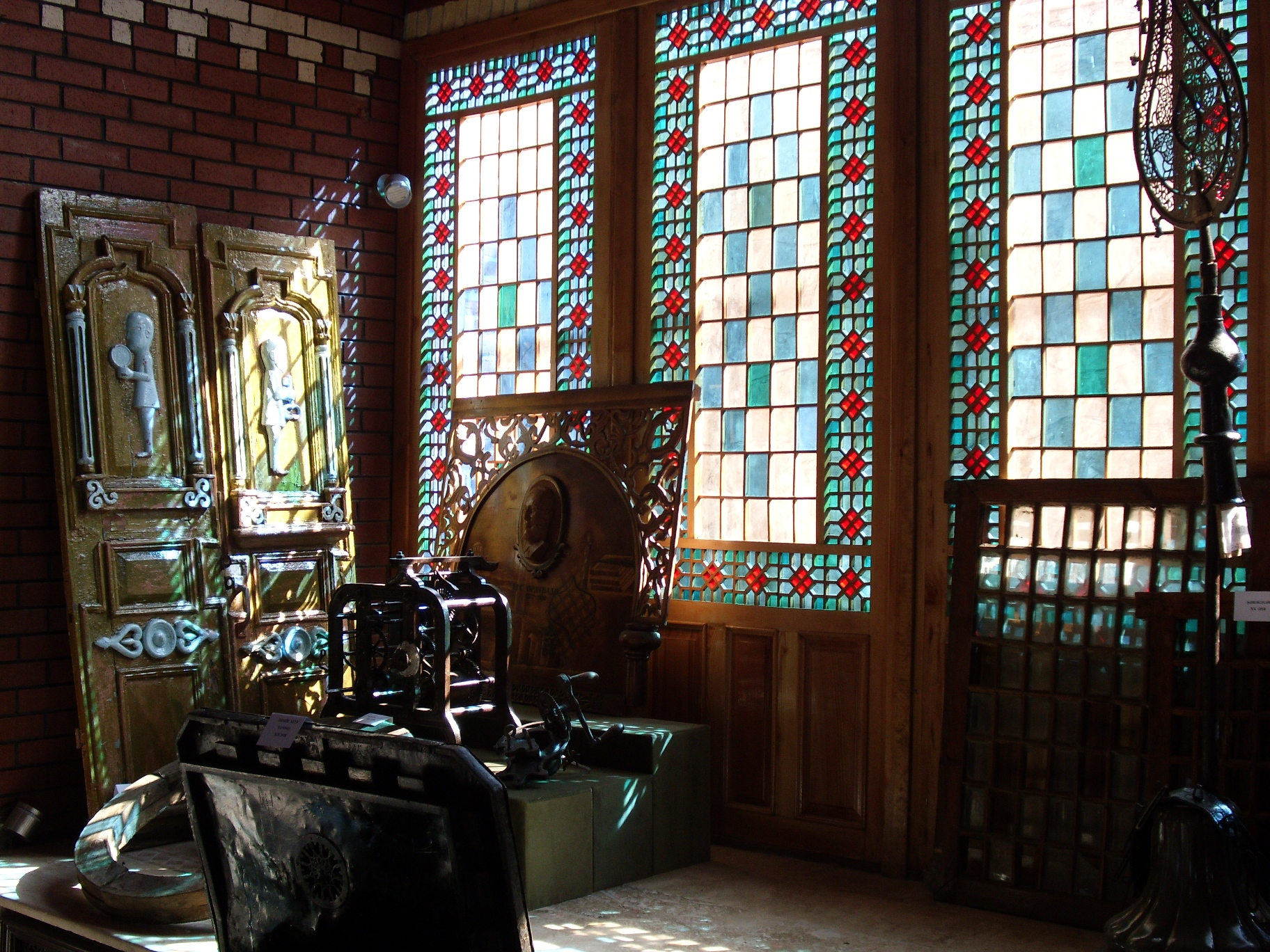

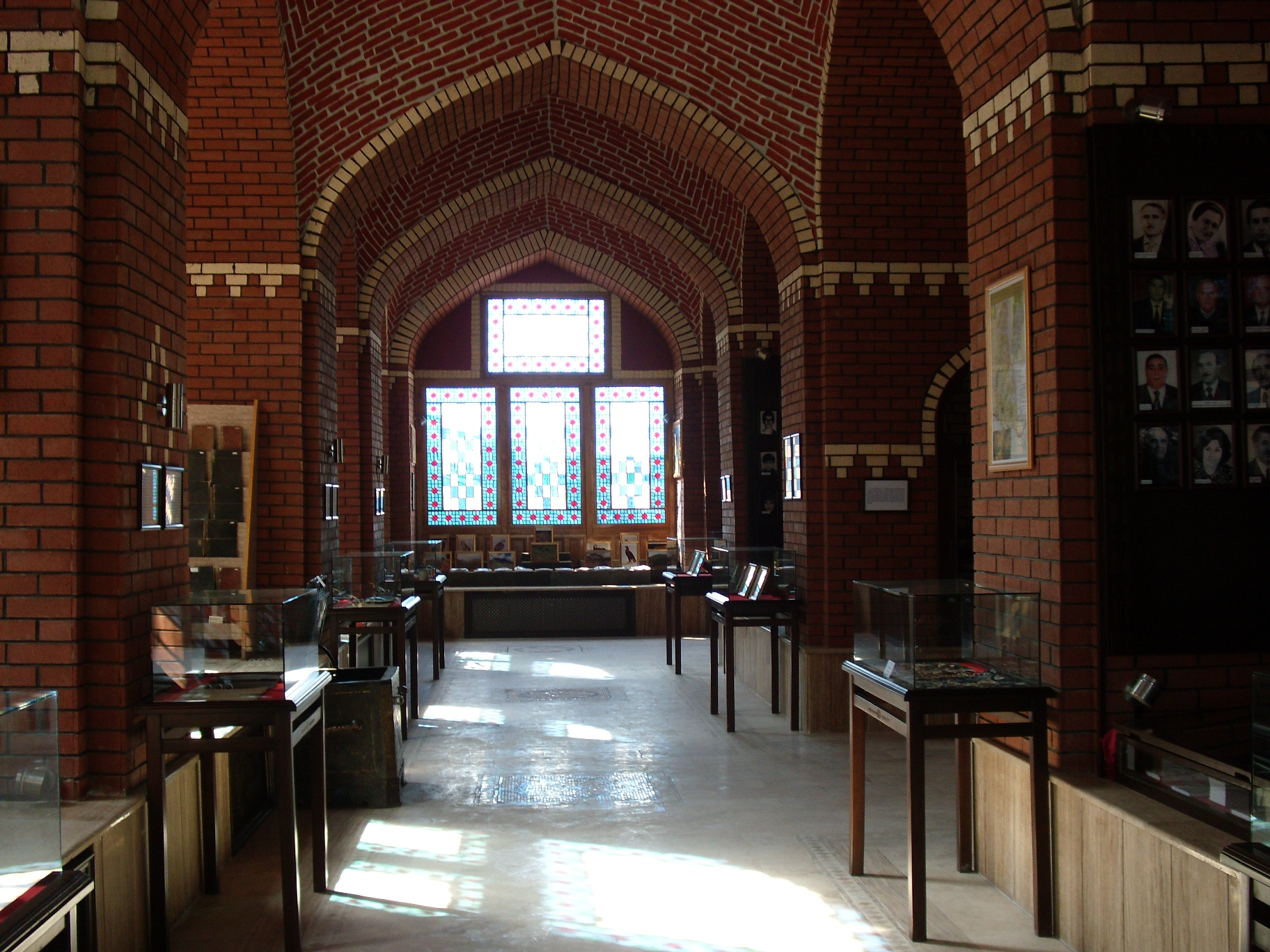

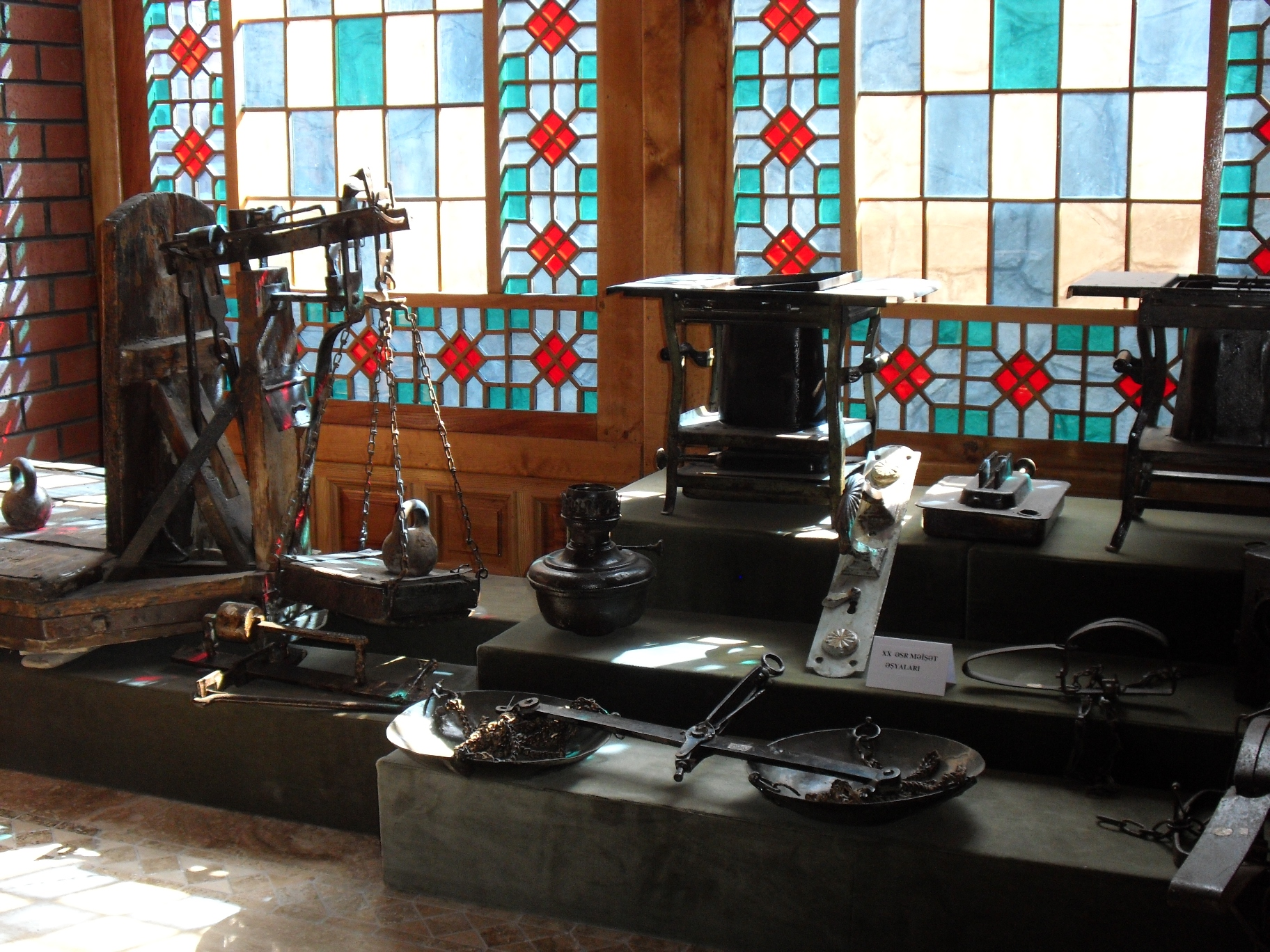

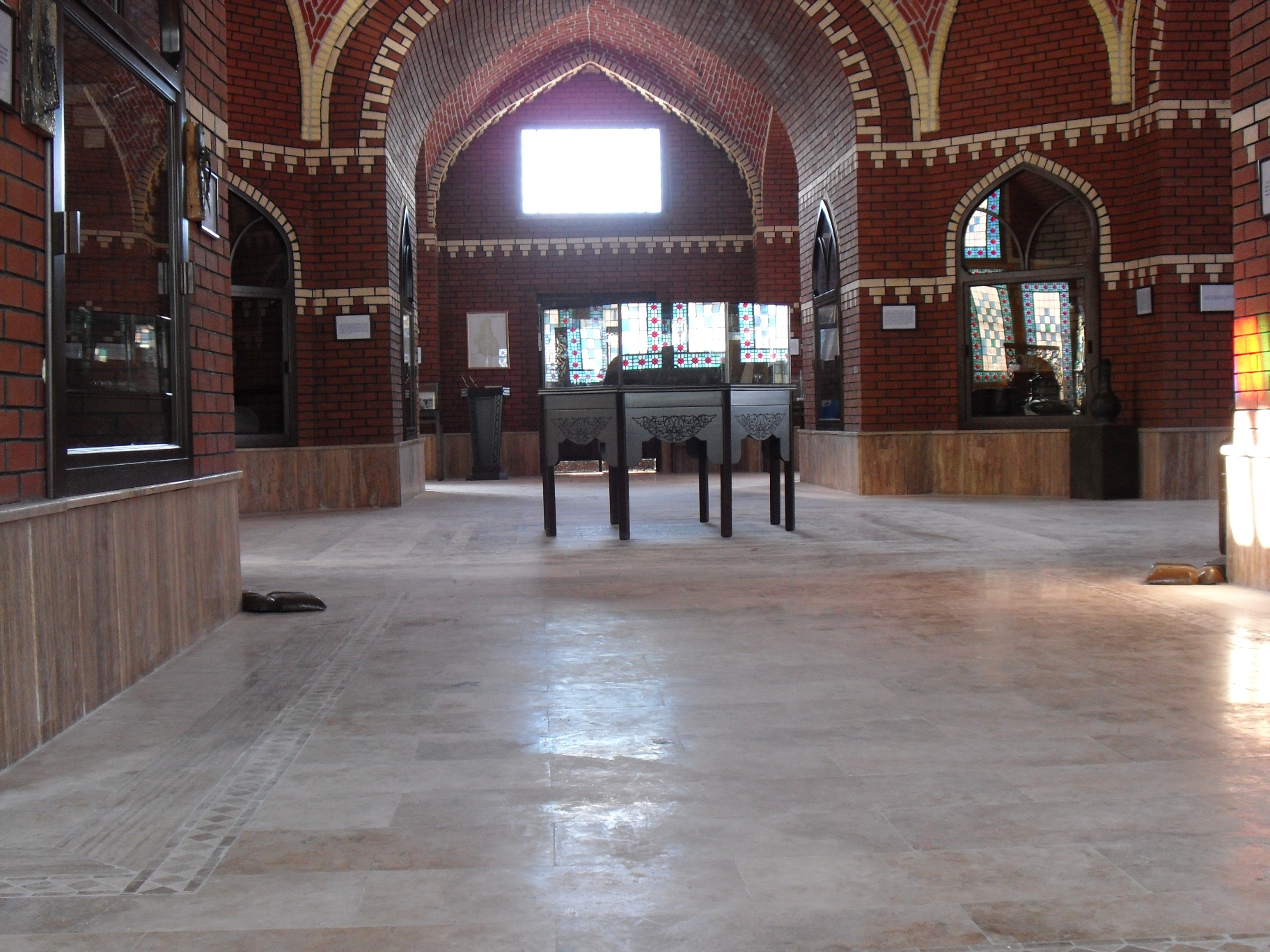

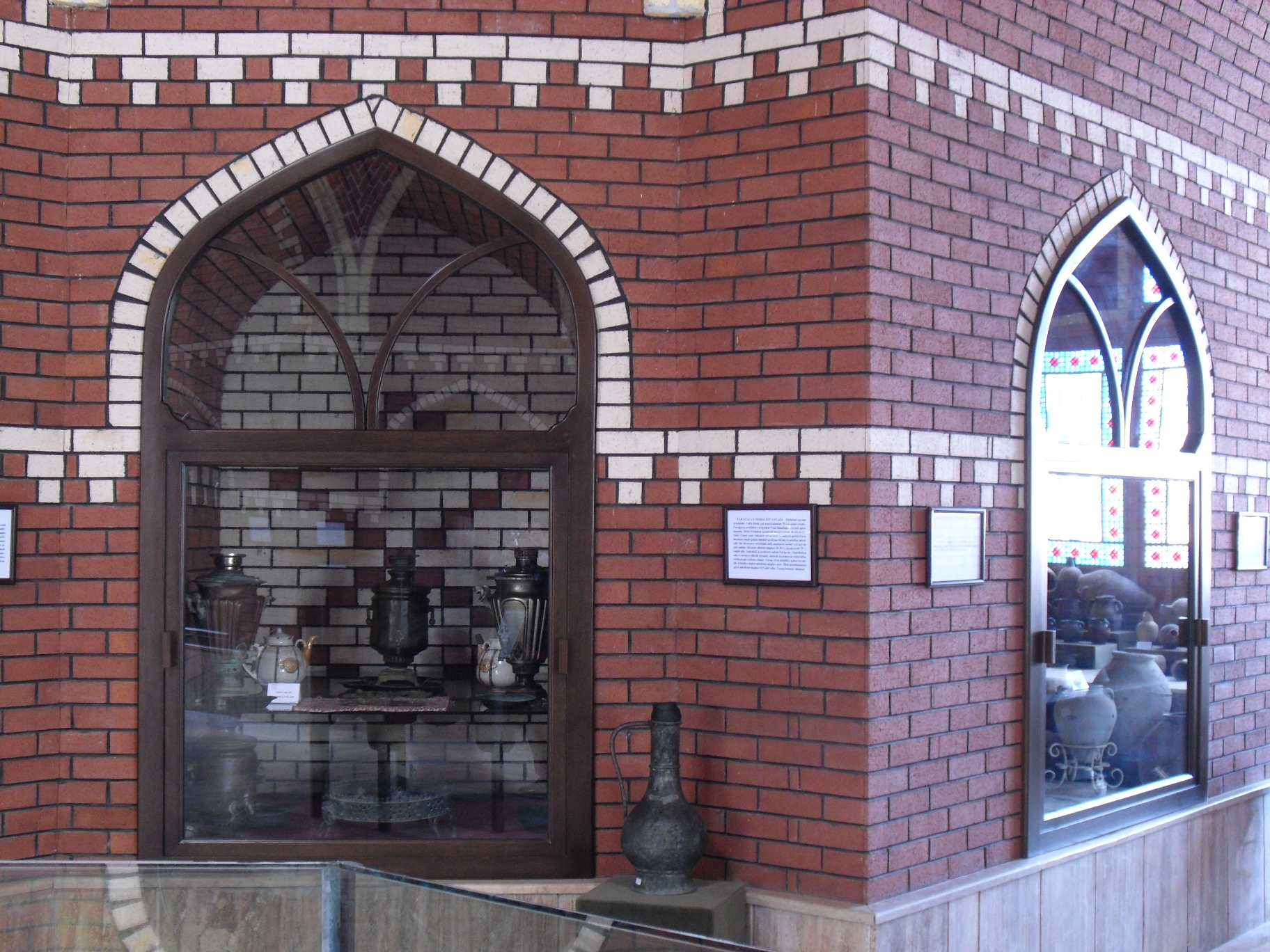

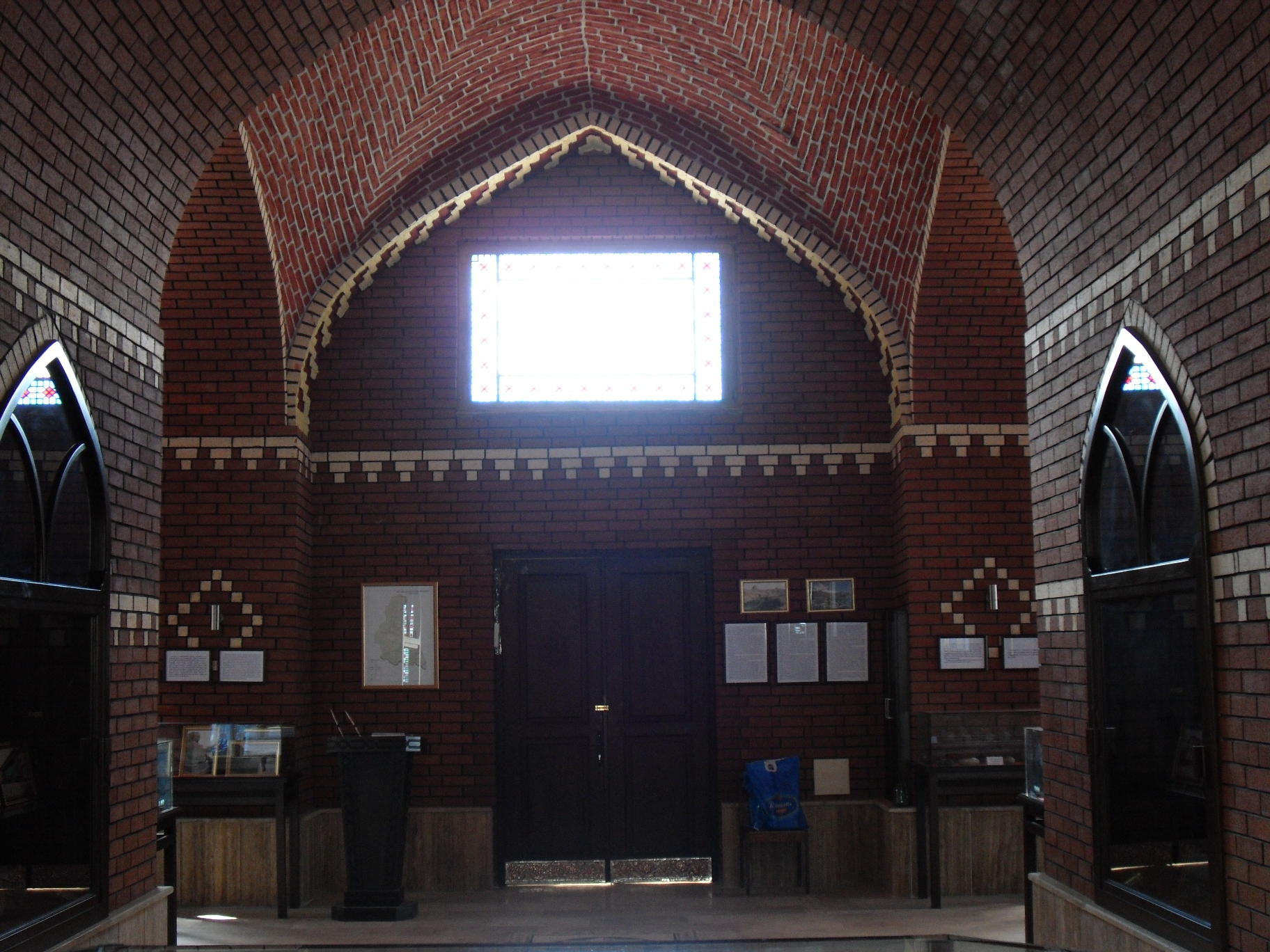

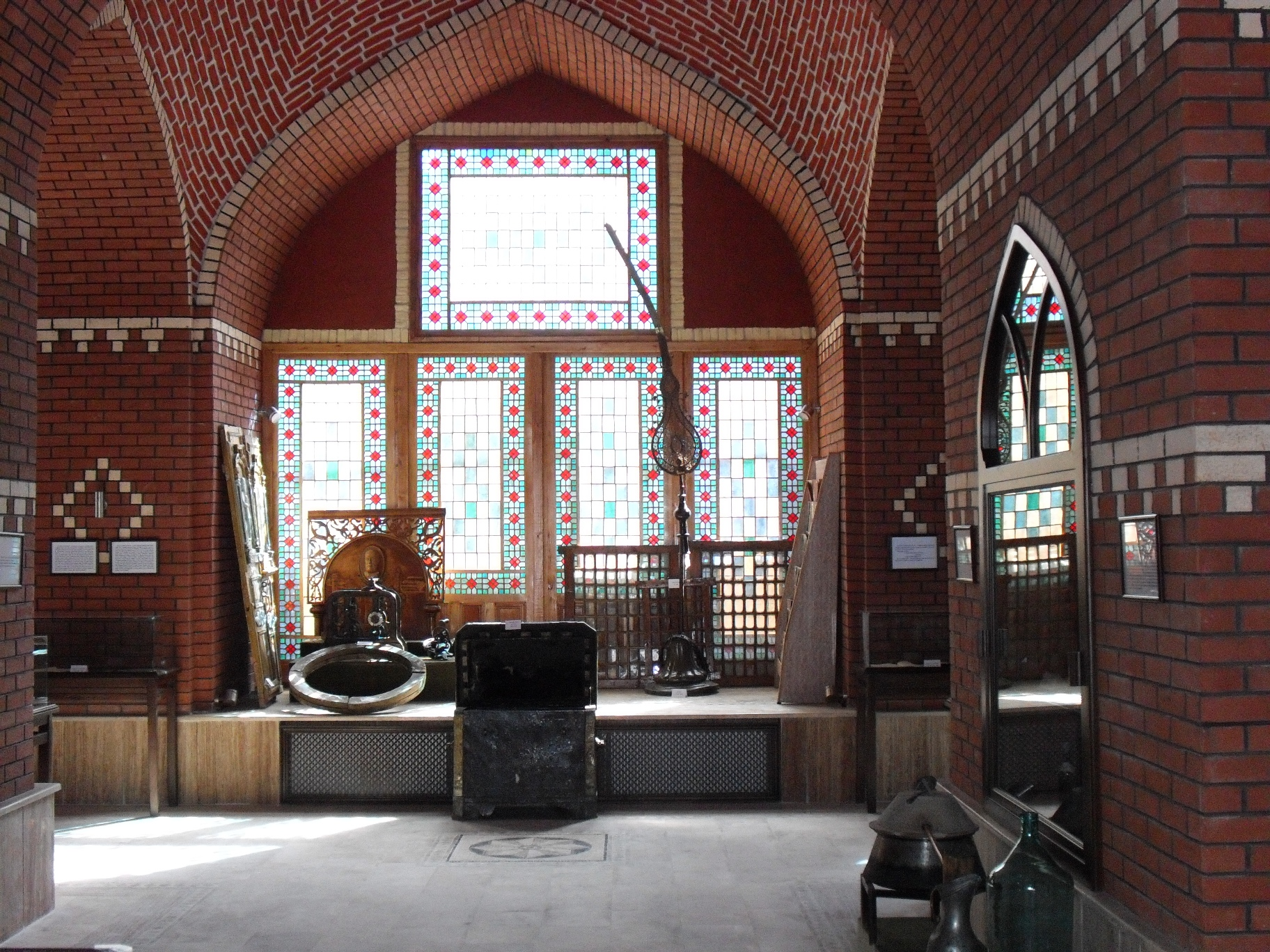

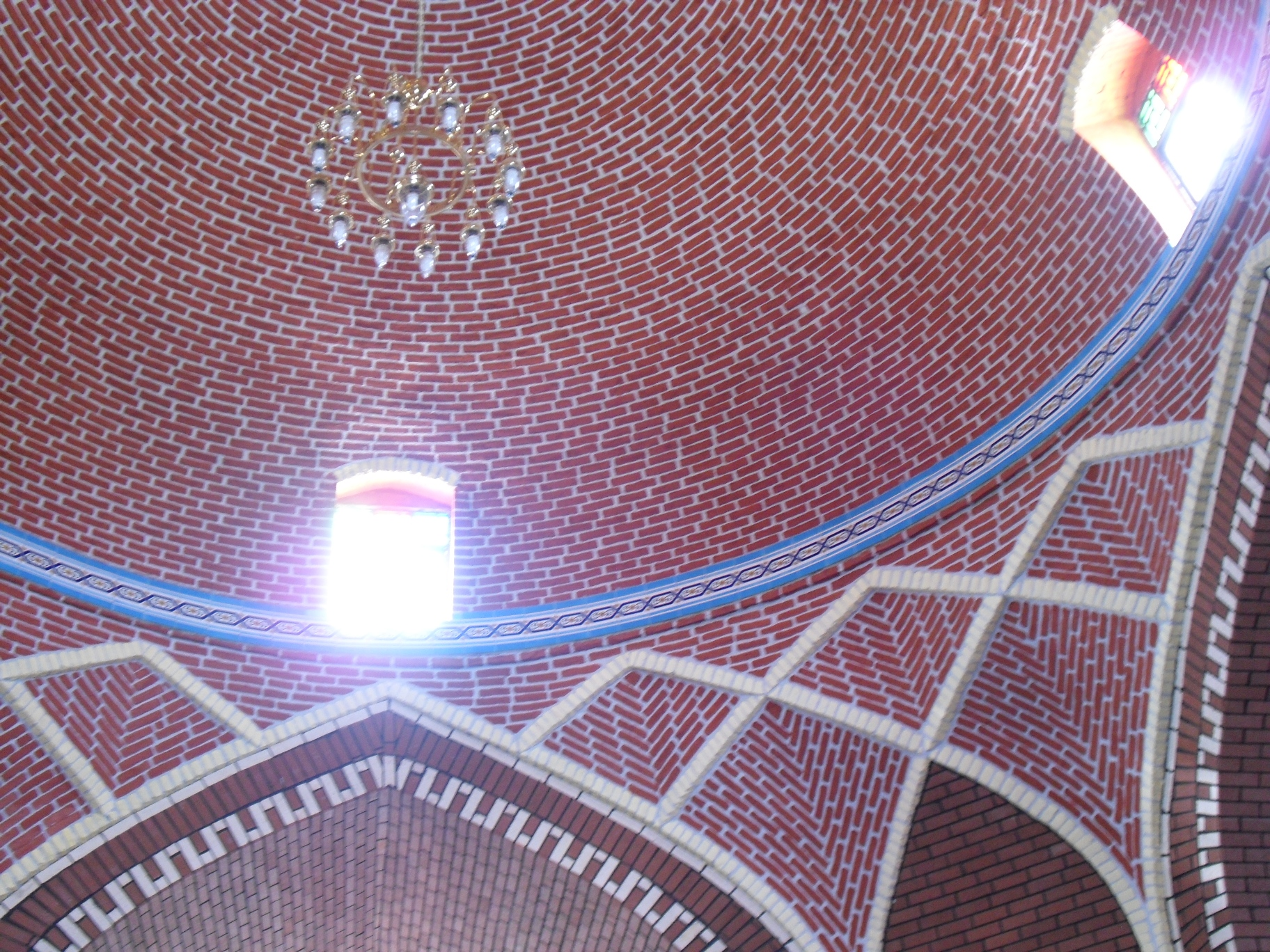

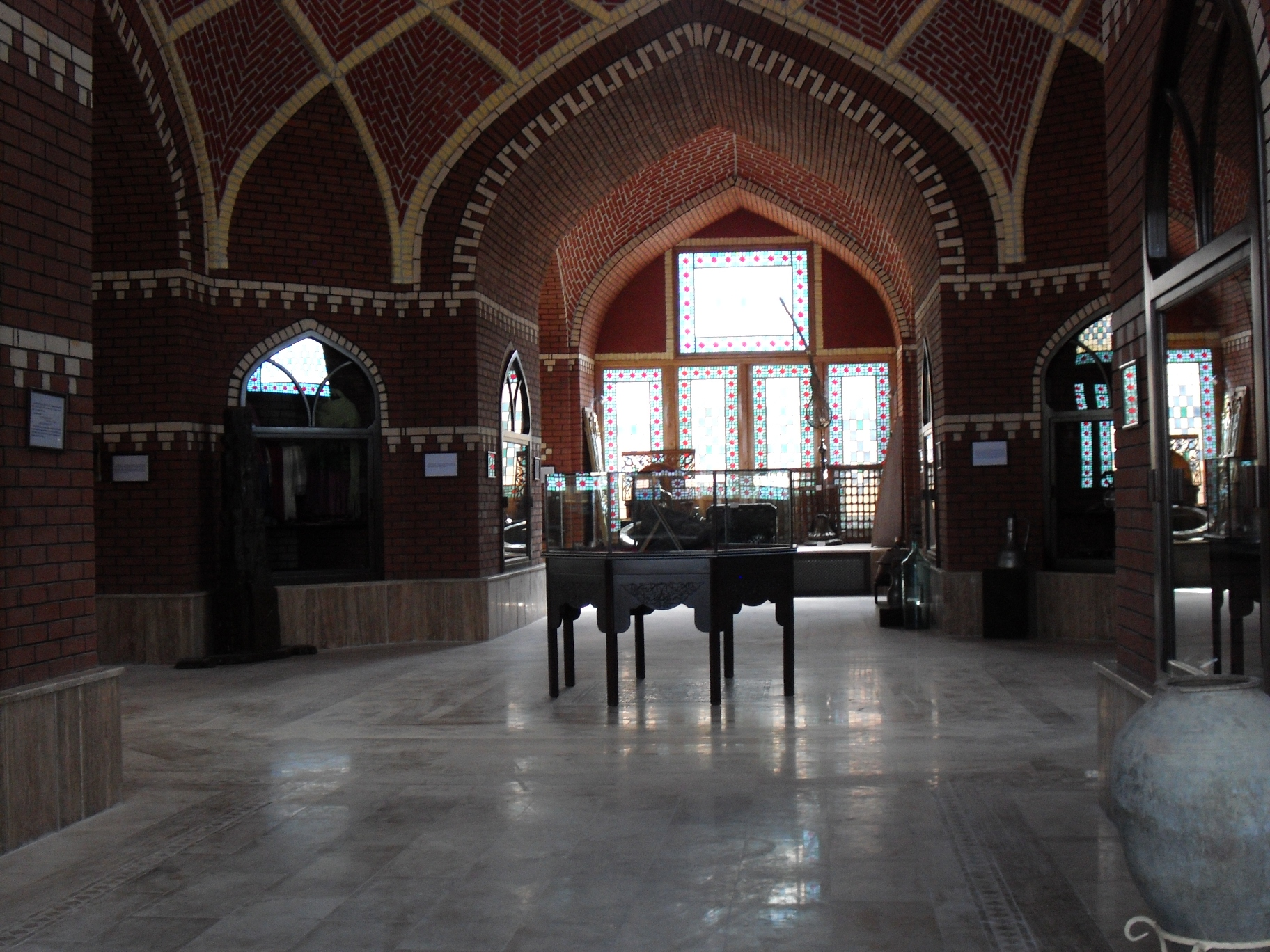

== See also ==
- Architecture of Azerbaijan
