= Najafgulu Rafiyev =

Soviet Azerbaijani army major (1915–1970)

Najafgulu Radzhabali oglu Rafiyev
- Nəcəfqulu Rəcəbəli oğlu Rəfiyev
- Born: 22 March 1915; Ordubad, Yerevan Governorate, Russian Empire
- Died: 24 December 1970 (aged 55); Baku, Soviet Union
- Burial place: Alley of Honor
- Military career
- Allegiance: Soviet Union
- Branch: Soviet Army
- Service years: 1935–1956
- Rank: Major
- Unit: 37th Mechanized Brigade
- Conflicts: World War II; Operation Barbarossa; Operation Bagration
- Awards: Hero of the Soviet Union; Order of Lenin; Order of the Red Star; Order of the Red Banner

Najafgulu Radzhabali oglu Rafiyev (Azerbaijani: Nəcəfqulu Rəcəbəli oğlu Rəfiyev; 22 March 1915 – 24 December 1970) was an Azerbaijani Soviet Army major and a Hero of the Soviet Union. Rafiyev was awarded the title for the leadership of his tank platoon during Operation Bagration. During the battle, his platoon cut of the German escape route after crossing the Ptsich and moving across the Bobruisk–Glusk highway. The platoon subsequently helped capture Baranovichi. Postwar, Rafiyev continued to serve in the army and retired in 1956. He lived in Baku.

== Early life ==
Rafiyev was born on 22 March 1915 in Ordubad to a working-class family. After nine years of studying at the sericulture courses in Tbilisi, he returned to Ordubad and worked as a senior inspector at the cocoon-seed station. He moved to Baku in 1931. Rafiyev graduated from trade school and then railway technical school. In 1935, he was drafted into the Red Army and sent to the armored forces. He graduated from the Leningrad Higher Armored School in 1941.

== World War II ==
Rafiyev fought in World War II from June 1941. On 26 June, he fought in battles south of Kremenets. He was wounded in the head but remained in the line. During the retreat Rafiyev fought south of Zhytomyr and Kharkiv. At Poltava Rafiyev's tank reportedly destroyed two heavy German tanks, six guns and killed more than 50 German soldiers. During an action at Matveyev Kurgan he was wounded a third time but did not leave the front. During the engagement, Rafiyev's crew reportedly destroyed a German tank, two heavy guns, mortars, and killed 35 German soldiers. In 1943, he joined the Communist Party of the Soviet Union.

Rafiyev became a tank platoon commander of the 3rd Tank Regiment of the 37th Mechanized Brigade, part of the 1st Mechanized Corps, and subsequently led them during Operation Bagration. On 26 June, near Bobruisk, the platoon captured the crossing over the Ptsich and moved along the Bobruisk-Glusk Highway, cutting the escape route for German troops. On 27 June, pursuing German troops, the platoon reached Lenino. On 8 July the platoon reached Baranovichi. On 7 July, he was awarded the Order of the Red Star. On 27 September, Rafiyev received the title Hero of the Soviet Union and the Order of Lenin for his leadership.

== Postwar ==
In 1945, Rafiyev graduated from the Higher School of Armored Officers. In 1951, he graduated from the Higher School of Self-Propelled Artillery Officers. He became a military commissar in the Julfa District. He retired in 1956 with the rank of major and later lived and worked in Baku. In 1969, he became an honorary citizen of Glusk. Rafiyev died on 24 December 1970 and was buried in the Alley of Honor.

== Legacy ==
Streets in Baku, Ordubad and Minsk are named for Rafiyev. A bust of Rafiyev was constructed in Ordubad.
