= Agayev =

Agayev (f. Agayeva, Russian: Агаев, Azerbaijani: Ağayev) is a surname. Notable people with the surname include:

- Alan Agayev (born 1977), Ossetian-Russian footballer
- Bekkhan Agayev (born 1975), Russian politician
- Ednan Agayev (born 1956), Russian diplomat
- Emin Ağayev (footballer) (born 1973), Azerbaijani footballer
- Kamran Agayev (born 1986), Azerbaijani footballer
- Mirshahin Agayev (born 1963)
- Muslim Agaýew, Turkmenistani footballer
- Salahat Ağayev (born 1991), Azerbaijani footballer

== See also ==
- Aghayev
