= Akbar Aghayev =

Soviet-Azerbaijani soldier

- Əkbər Ağayev
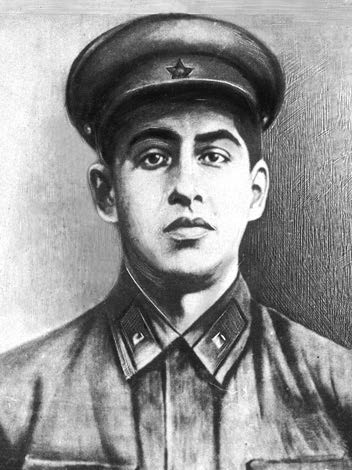
- Akbar Aghayev pre-1941 wearing army attire
- Born: 1919; Ordubad, Nakhichevansky Uyezd, Azerbaijan Democratic Republic
- Died: August 18, 1944 (aged 24–25); Buchenwald, Weimar, Germany
- Military career
- Allegiance: Soviet Union
- Branch: Red Army
- Service years: 1939–1941
- Rank: Lieutenant
- Nickname: Ivan Sport
- Conflicts: World War II; Eastern Front

Akbar Sattar oglu Aghayev (Azerbaijani: Əkbər Səttar oğlu Ağayev; 1919 – 1944), was a Soviet-Azerbaijani servicemen, lieutenant of the Red Army, and one of the leaders of the anti-fascist resistance in the Buchenwald concentration camp.

== Life ==
Akbar Sattar oglu Aghayev was born in 1919 in the city of Ordubad, Nakhichevansky Uyezd, Azerbaijan Democratic Republic. An Azerbaijani by nationality, he began serving in the Red Army in 1939. In 1941, he joined the Communist Party of the Soviet Union. In the same year, he was critically wounded in battles on the Belorussian front and was taken prisoner. In the summer of 1942, he was sent to the Buchenwald concentration camp for his anti-fascist propaganda among prisoners of war, and repeated organized escape attempts.

In the camp, Aghayev was kept under the number 7665, and was known by the nickname Ivan Sport. In Buchenwald, Aghayev continued his struggle and, in a short time, became one of the active members and leaders of the underground anti-fascist resistance organization. One of the members of this organization, Y. Nikolashin, wrote in his memoirs that Aghayev was "not afraid of death, because the boundless hatred of the Nazis that seethed in him was stronger than fear". G. Boyko, in his book "Memories of the Buchenwald Concentration Camp", wrote that all the most responsible and difficult tasks were entrusted to Aghayev. He was a member of the "Group of Vengeance", which eliminated the Nazi spies and deserters.

Akbar Aghayev, for his active involvement in the Buchenwald Resistance, was executed by a firing squad on August 18, 1944.

== Memory ==
A street, a high school, and a collective farm in Ordubad District were named after Akbar Aghayev.

== Sources ==
- Main editorhsip of the Azerbaijani Soviet Encyclopedia (1976). "Ағајев Әкбәр Сәттар оғлу". Azerbaijani Soviet Encyclopedia (in Azerbaijani) (I ed.). p. 96.
- Madatov, Garash (1975). Азербайджан в Великой Отечественной войне Azerbaydzhan v Velikoy Otechestvennoy voyne [Azerbaijan in the Great Patriotic War]. Baku: Elm.
