= Ordubad =

- City and municipality
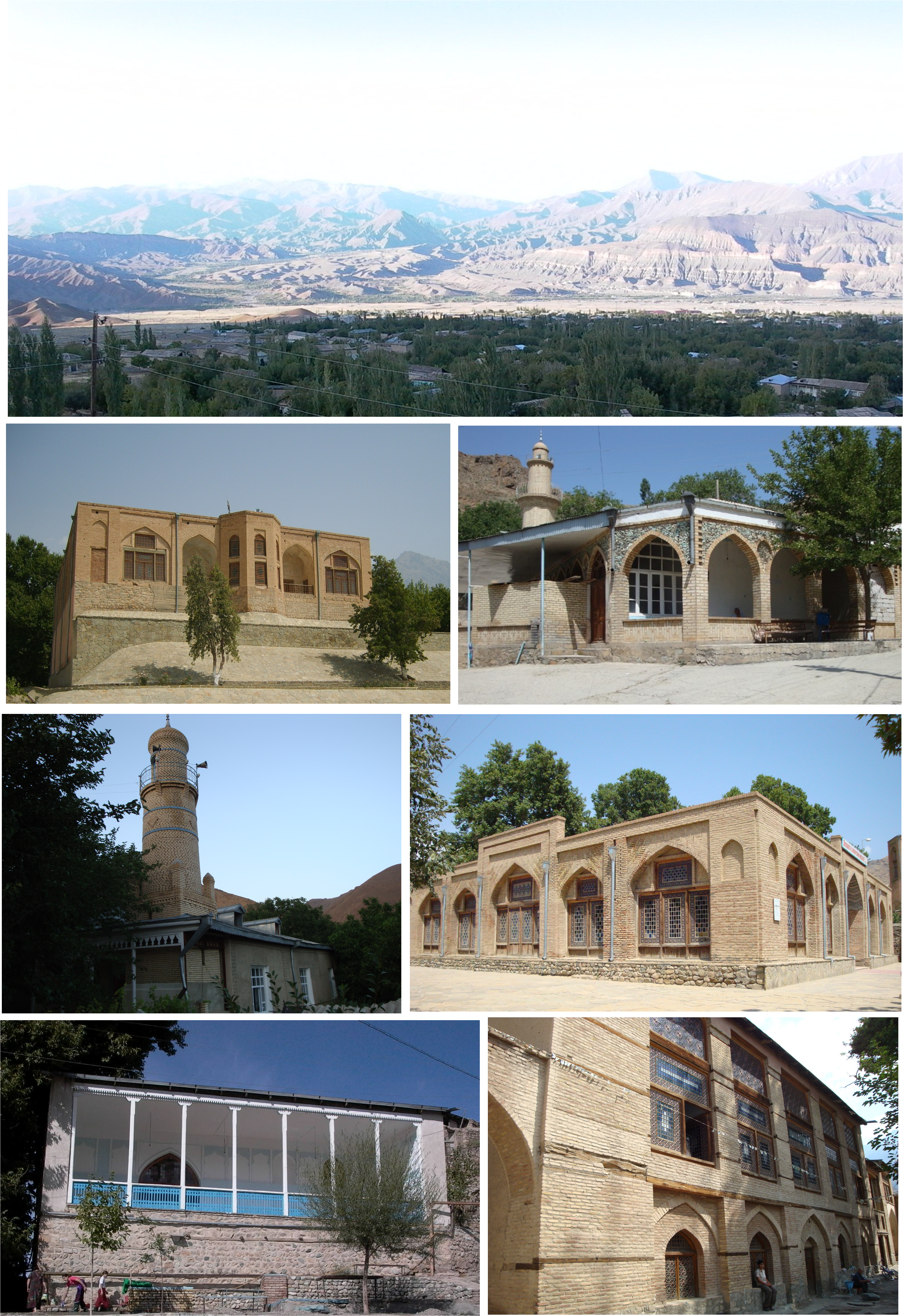
- Landmarks of Ordubad, from top left: Panorama view of Ordubad and mountain range area • Juma Mosque; Huseyinuh Mosque • Dirnis Mosque; Geysarriya Monument • Ambaras Mosque; Sarshahar Mosque

- Location within Azerbaijan
- Coordinates: 38°54′29″N 46°01′40″E
- Country: Azerbaijan
- Autonomous republic: Nakhchivan Autonomous Republic
- District: Ordubad

Population
  - Total: 10,372
- Time zone: UTC+4 (AZT)
- Postal code: AZ6900
- Area code: +994 036

Ordubad is the second largest city of Azerbaijan's Nakhchivan Autonomous Republic and the capital of an eponymous district. Ordubad is a medieval city of the Caucasus and, in its current capacity of a town was founded in the 18th century. The town is divided into five districts: Ambaras, Kurdtatal, Mingis, Sarshahar, and Uch.

Ordubad is well known for its exports of fruits and spices, and for its cuisine.

== Etymology ==
Ordubad is a name of Turko-Persian origin and means "army town", from Turkic ordu ("army") and Persian bad ("town"), which implies that the city was founded during the period of the Mongol or the ensuing Il-Khanid rule. The historian and geographer Hamdallah Mustawfi (1281–1349) mentions Ordubad in the mid-14th century as "a provincial town, one of the five towns making up the tumān of Nakhchivan, with fine gardens, and producing good grapes, corn and cotton".

French traveller Jean Saint-Martin mentions, in his 1818 book about the geography of Armenia, that the contemporary people referred to the city as Ordouvar (Armenian: Որդուվար) or Ourdovar (Armenian: Ուրդովար) in Armenian, and Ardoubad in Turkish and Persian, and that the settlement had already existed in the 14th century.

== Location ==
Ordubad city is located at an elevation of 949 metres (3,114 ft). It is on the northern bank of the central stretch of the Aras River. The river that rises from the north from the Mt. Qobān (also known as Qapïjïq in Turkish and Kapudzhukh or Kapydzhik in Russian) at an elevation of 3,904 metres (12,808 ft) drains into the Araxes. The town is divided into five districts: Ambaras, Kurdtatal, the Mingis, Sarshahar, and Uch. The city has a large number of walnut and mulberry trees. The closest railway station is Ordubad and the distance to Nakhchivan city is 88 kilometres (55 mi). Tabriz is 94 kilometres (58 mi) away to the north-northwest.

Both Azerbaijan's absolute minimum temperature (−33 °C or −27.4 °F) and the absolute maximum temperature (46 °C or 114.8 °F) were observed in Ordubad (and also in Julfa).

== Climate ==
Climate data for Ordubad(normals for 1936-1991)
Month	Jan	Feb	Mar	Apr	May	Jun	Jul	Aug	Sep	Oct	Nov	Dec	Year
Average precipitation mm (inches)	20.1 (0.79)	21.6 (0.85)	29.0 (1.14)	38.5 (1.52)	45.0 (1.77)	24.8 (0.98)	8.8 (0.35)	6.5 (0.26)	9.9 (0.39)	25.7 (1.01)	23.3 (0.92)	19.6 (0.77)	272.8 (10.75)
Average precipitation days (≥ 0.01 in)	6.3	6.3	8.3	10.1	11.7	6.8	2.7	2	2.6	5.6	5.9	5.9	74.2
Source: NCEI

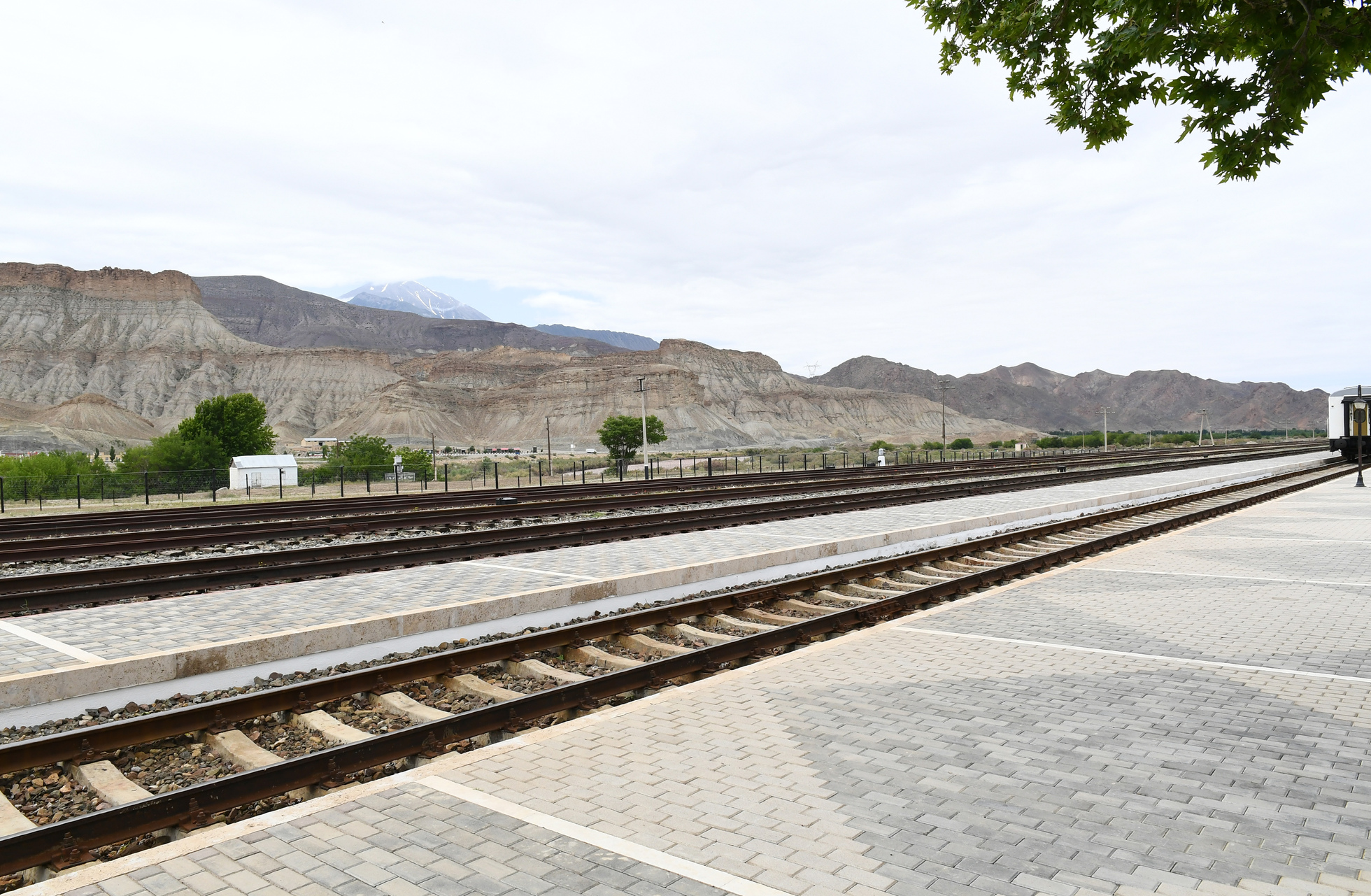
Ordubad railway station

== Demographics ==
The ethnic composition of Ordubad
Ethnic group	1875 census	1897 census	1916 almanac	1989 census	1991 census	2008 census
Tatars (later known as Azerbaijanis)	4,700	4,088	5,449			
Armenians	300	284	179			
Russians		179	86			
Others		60	3			
TOTAL	5,000	4,611	5,717	9,395	9,500	10,372

== History ==
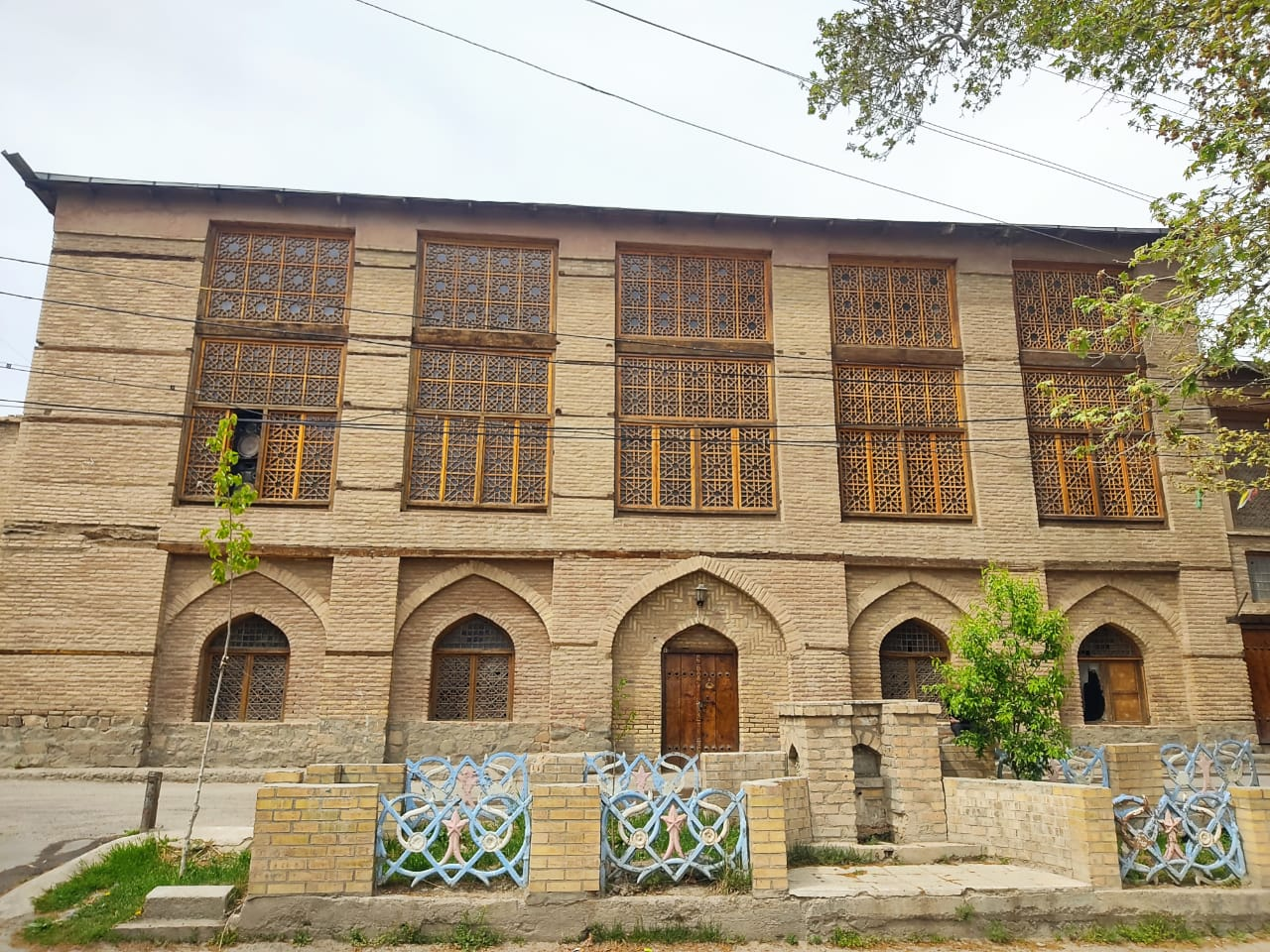
Sersehir Mosque

The city may have been established by the 14th century, or earlier. The Ottoman Empire (1299–1923) had occupied the Ordubad territory in the past. Before this occupation, a local rebellion had been organized against invasion of the Ottomans by Hadji, known as "Kasab" (butcher) and Bayandar when they learned that the Saffavids intended to attack. They were backed by the local people. The rebels initially took control of the city and also occupied a fortress near the city. However, the rebels had their own internal dissensions, and as a result a small battalion of the Safavid army defeated the rebels and killed them. Following this victory and occupation by the Safavids, Khaten bey Ordubadi, the prime vizier, appealed to the Shah to waive off all taxes levied on the local people, which was agreed.

Ordubad was once an important regional stop on the caravan route of the Silk Road trade with China, Europe and India. The city was first founded as Gala city, a feudal city, on the top of the Ambras on the left bank of Ordubadchay river in the 15th century. In view of extensive trade, the city started developing on the right bank of the Ordubadchay with many new districts. In the 17th and 18th centuries trade centres were established in the city on the right bank, which diminished the importance of Gala city. Built in the backdrop of Zangezur Caucasus mountain it is enclosed on three sides by mountains providing for a very green environment. In the 17th century the city underwent major reconstruction activity, maintaining eastern feudal architectural features. Following the Russo-Persian War (1826-1828), the town passed from Iranian rule to Imperial Russian rule under the Treaty of Turkmenchay of 1828. According to a census conducted in 1834, Ordubad, with its 52 villages, had a population of 11,341 consisting of Muslims and Armenians. From 1849–1868, the city was the center of the Ordubad uezd.

The Ordubad site was added to the UNESCO World Heritage Tentative List on 24 October 2001 in the Cultural category under Criteria (i), (iv) and (v).

=== Archaeological excavations ===
Archaeological excavations carried out by Russian archaeologists in ancient settlements of Ordubad have unearthed remnants of Bronze Age dated to the fourth century. It includes a necropolis, which revealed graves of warriors also dated to the fourth century. These were initially assessed, in 1928, as skeletons of only warrior men but subsequent research carried out by the Archaeological and Ethnological Institute of Azerbaijan National Academy of Science in 2004 has concluded that at least one of the skeletons is of a woman warrior found with her armory such as quiver, arrows and helmet.

== Economy ==
Ordubad's economy is dependent on trade, particularly of fruits, wheat, and silk; grapes are of 40 varieties. The silk exports have been mostly to Venice, Marseille, Amsterdam and many other places in Europe, from the middle of the 16th century. During the early years of the 20th century, Ordubad silk received 13 gold medals in international exhibitions and fairs. Arak is also an export commodity of the city. Economic activity in Ordubad and nearby regions includes copper mining, Paragachayskoe molybdenum deposit from the Meghri-Ordubad gratoidnym batholiths, bauxite, tungsten and tin ore.

== Industry ==
21 industrial plants operated in the region in 2015. The average number of people working for industry is 634. The cost of industrial products was 8469,7 thousand manat in 2015. Its rate is 4.8 times more than the level in 2005. There are 9 milk processing plants in Ordubad. The daily production rate is 24 ton. Besides, the wine plant ''Oren-Gala" produces pomegranate juice.

== Features of the city ==
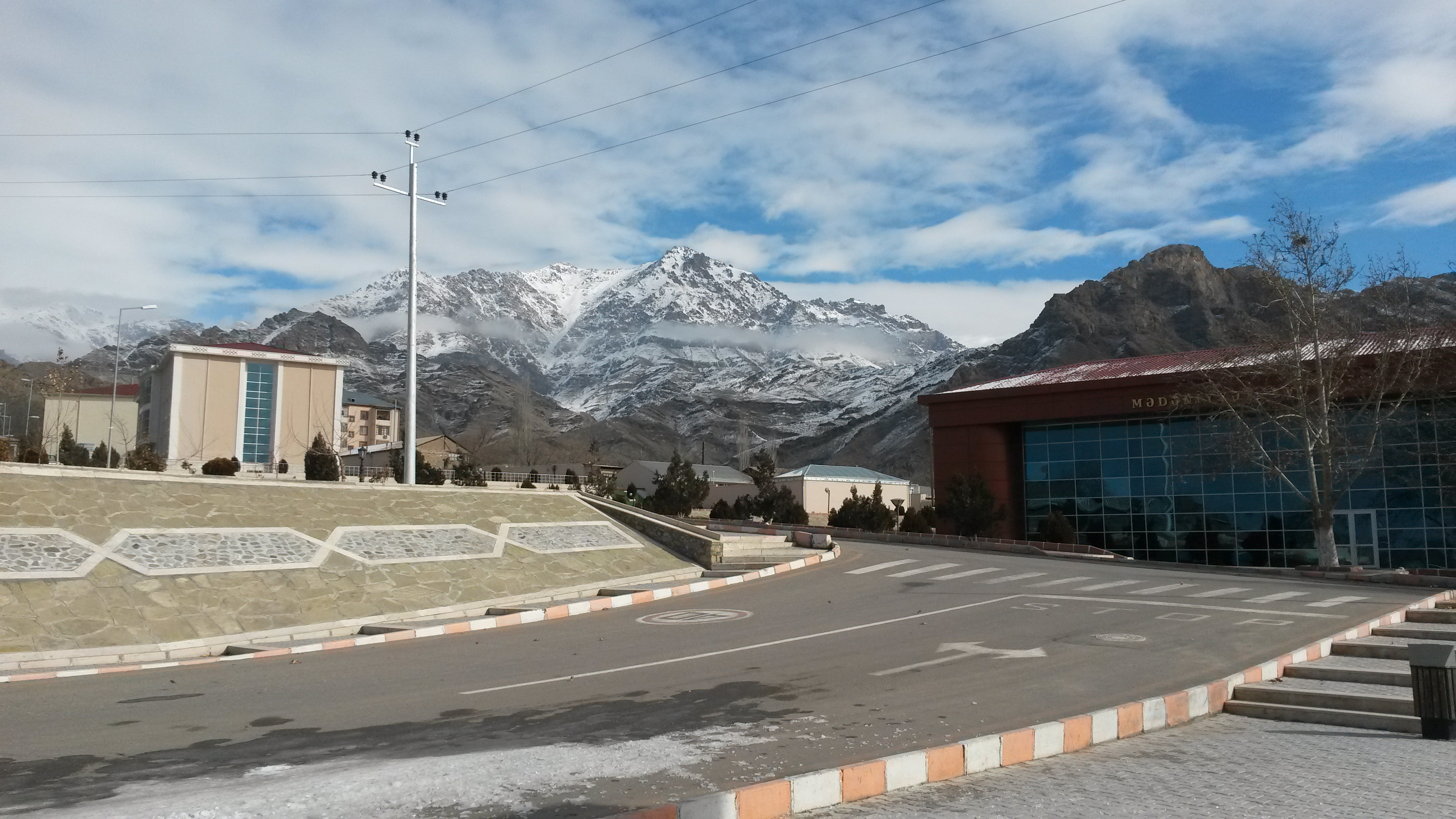
A view of Ordubad

In the new city of Ordubad, planned in the 17th century, there were five divisions or districts with trade squares of larger size than the earlier blocks, which also had a plethora of mosques, springs, and bath-houses. The medieval market square in the heart of the city is prominent and the glass mosque, the Juma Mosque, is a landmark. Caravan sheds and the market here traded in silk and dry fruits with East European countries. The lay out of the streets is radial and appears in the shape of a fan close to the center of the city. Each of the streets have squares which are a typical feature of the city. A well known suburb of the city is Akulis through which a small stream flows. The city has many private and public schools. The city has a number qanats or underground canals called "kahriz", which are the source of water for houses and orchards. The city reflects tradition and culture of northern and southern Azerbaijan.

=== Museums ===
There are three museums in Ordubad.

- Memorial Museum of Mammad Said Ordubadi - established in 1972, holds more than 700 exhibits.
- The House-Museum of Academician Yusif Mammadaliyev - established in 1975, holds more than 1800 exhibits.
- Ordubad History Museum - established in December 1980, holds nearly 3500 exhibits and fragments.

=== Juma Mosque ===
Juma Mosque, in the heart of the city, was initially built as the office of Hatambek Ordubadi vizier of Shah Abbas, in the 17th century. Even now it looks more like a palace. The history museum, located on the opposite side, is a domed structure that is dated to the 18th century which in the past was used as a silk shop, restaurant and zurkhaneh ("house of strength"). Soviet era photos are exhibited here. The porch here was once decorated with statues of Russian communists and the roof was also designed in Russian architecture, and these have since been removed.

=== Qeyyseriye ===
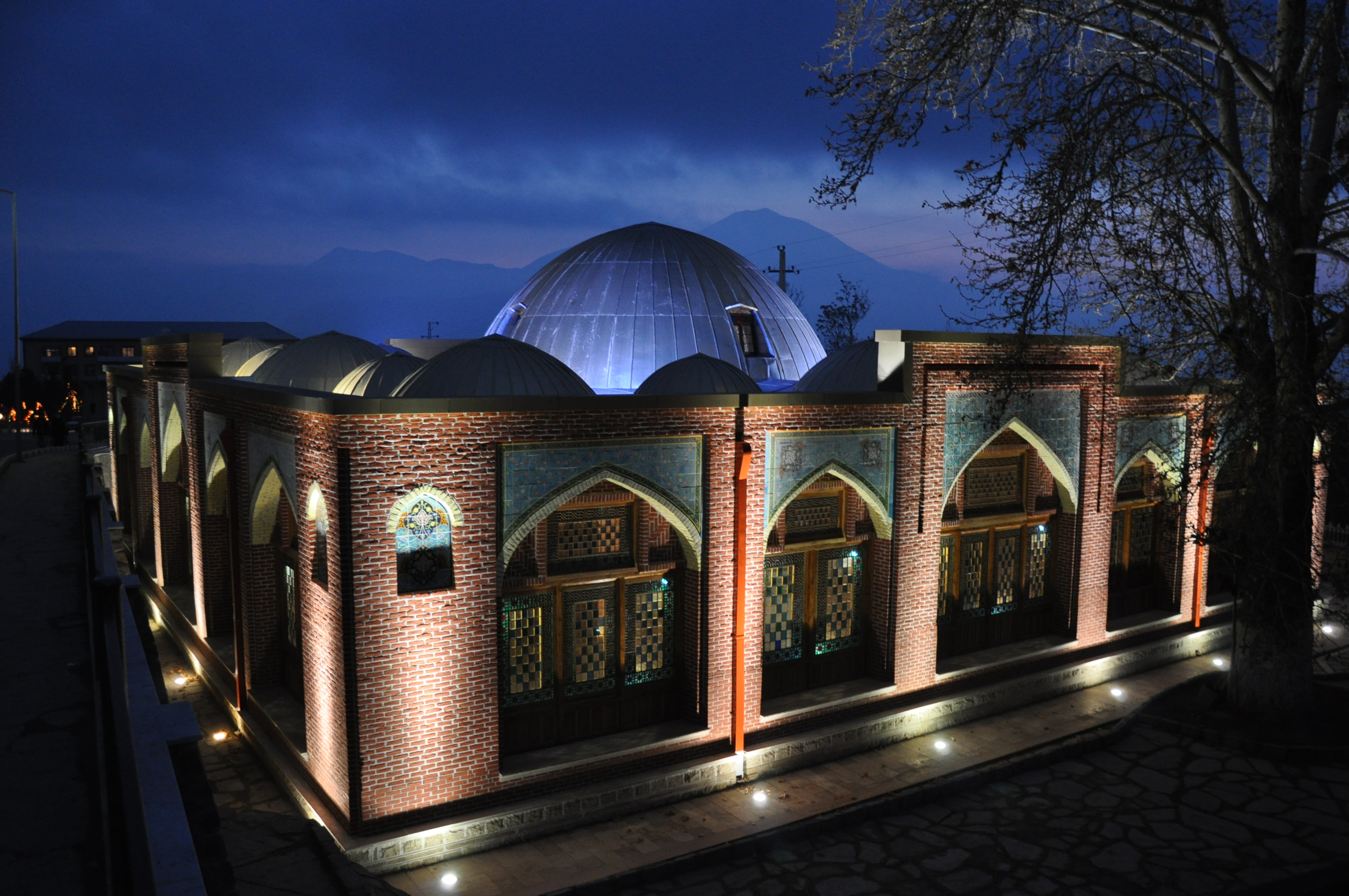
Geysariyye Monument at night

Geysariyye Monument is a historic edifice dated to the 17th century, located in the main market centre. It is now a historical and ethnography museum.

=== Gemigaya Mountain ===
Gemigaya Mountain is an important backdrop to the city which is known for its petroglyphs, necropolises, and ancient settlements of Ordubad, Sabirkend, Plovdagh and Kharaba Gilan, which attests to its occupancy between 7th to 1st century BC. It is situated within the Ordubad National Park.

=== Observatory ===
In the Astronomical Observatory at Ordubad, Nakhchivan ASSR and also at the Tarija, Bolivia, with the help of expedition astrograph, 6,000 plates were recorded from 1983–1988 which cataloged 200,000 stars south of the equator up to the 11th magnitude.

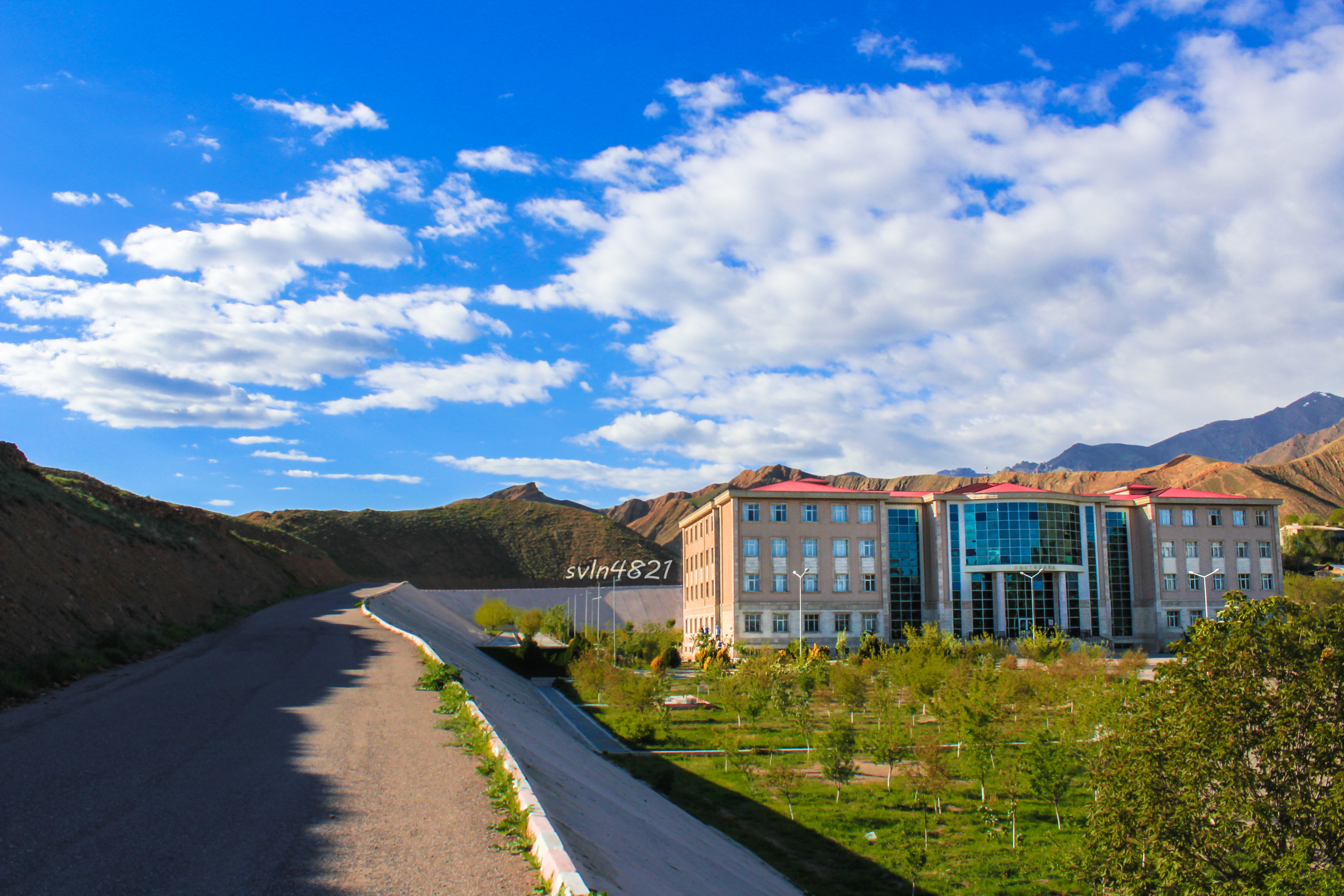
Ordubad Hospital

== Notable natives ==
- Hatem Beg Ordubadi — Safavid vizier from 1591 to 1610/1.
- Mirza Taleb Khan Ordubadi — Safavid vizier from 1632 to 1633.
- İsmayıl İbrahimov — Scientist, Hero of Socialist Labor.
- Mammed Said Ordubadi — Writer.
- Najafgulu Rafiyev — Hero of the Soviet Union.
- Novruz Rizayev — People's Commissar of Internal Affairs of Azerbaijan SSR (1927–1929).
- Victor Cherokov — Soviet military commander, Vice Admiral.
- Yusif Mammadaliyev — chemist, founder of petrochemical science in Azerbaijan.
- Aliyar Safarli — Former ambassador of Azerbaijan in Iran and professor
- Akbar Aghayev — Soviet soldier killed in the Holocaust

== Bibliography ==
- McNally, Derek (2012). Reports on Astronomy. Springer Science & Business Media. ISBN 978-94-011-3364-7.
- Mayor, Adrienne (2014). The Amazons: Lives and Legends of Warrior Women across the Ancient World. Princeton University Press. ISBN 978-1-4008-6513-0.
- Noble, John; Kohn, Michael; Systermans, Danielle (2008). Georgia, Armenia & Azerbaijan. Ediz. Inglese. Lonely Planet. ISBN 978-1-74104-477-5.
- USA International Business Publications (2007). Azerbaijan Mineral & Mining Sector Investment and Business Guide. Int'l Business Publications. ISBN 978-1-4330-0349-3.
- Rustamkhanli, Sabir (2013). My Road of Life. AuthorHouse. ISBN 978-1-4817-9182-3.
- Sayyāḥ, Muḥammad ʻAlī (1999). An Iranian in Nineteenth Century Europe: The Travel Diaries of Haj Sayyah, 1859–1877. Ibex Publishers, Inc. ISBN 978-0-936347-93-6.
- Zardabli, Ismail bey (2014). The History of Azerbaijan: from ancient times to the present day. Lulu.com. ISBN 978-1-291-97131-6.
