= Nakhchivan local government =

Nakhchivan Local Government (Azerbaijani:Naxçıvan məhəlli höküməti; Russian:Нахичеванское местное правительство) or Nakhchivan District Government (Azerbaijani:Naxçıvan Qəza Hökuməti; Russian:Нахичеванское уездное правительство) — was a local self-governing body in the Nakhchivan district during the years 1918–1919.

== History ==
Shortly after the Ottoman Empire established its authority in the southern part of the Erivan Governorate, an Ottoman officer, Süreyya Bey, was appointed as the head of the Nakhchivan district. Following the incorporation of these territories into the Ottoman Empire under the Treaty of Batum, Süreyya Bey was replaced by Halil Turgut Bey. Subsequently, Ali Shafiq Bey succeeded Turgut Bey and remained head of Nakhchivan until the withdrawal of Ottoman forces from the region as stipulated by the Armistice of Mudros.

In November 1918, with the beginning of the Ottoman army's evacuation from the region, Şevki Pasha, commander of the Ottoman Ninth Division, appointed Mirza Nasrulla Bey Amirov, a member of the local Azerbaijani elite, as head of the local government. Following the events of December, the Nakhchivan government, together with the Nakhchivan khans, who were in implicit rivalry with the Republic of Aras, gradually consolidated power in their hands. By the end of December, Mirza Nasrulla Bey was replaced by Haji Mehdi Baghirov.

On 4 January 1919, the Nakhchivan government began the formation of the Nakhchivan National Council. The council was composed of five representatives from each part of the Sharur–Nakhchivan region. Elections were concluded on 17 January. The National Council was chaired by Amir Bey Zamanbeyzadeh, who had previously headed the Republic of Aras. Among its members were Haji Mehdi Baghirov, Jafargulu Khan Nakhchivanski, Ghanbarali Bey Bananiyarli from Alinjachay, and the finance minister of the Republic of Aras.

However, the National Council's activities could not continue for long. Intrigues by members of the old Nakhchivan khan family undermined its functioning. Karim Khan Iravanski, commander of the Nakhchivan armed units and a relative of Kelbali Khan Nakhchivanski, resigned from his post, which provoked discontent and unrest among the armed forces. Additionally, rumors spread that the Sharur population did not wish to host Nakhchivan armed units on their territory and demanded their withdrawal. This further increased tensions among Nakhchivan fighters. As a result, Amir Bey, the secretary-general of the National Council, and Mashadi Aliaskar Agha Hamzazadeh, commander of the Sharur forces, were arrested. In practice, Karim Khan and Kelbali Khan concentrated real power in their hands. Some time later, both Mashadi Aliaskar Agha and Amir Bey were released. At the 24 January meeting of the National Council, Haji Mehdi Baghirov was accused of causing disorder and was imprisoned.

Thus, following the dissolution of the National Council on 25 January, khanate rule was established in Nakhchivan. The government was headed by Jafargulu Khan Nakhchivanski, with Abbasgulu Bey Tahirov as his deputy. Karim Khan Iravanski commanded the armed forces, assisted by Kelbali Khan Nakhchivanski, while Bahram Khan Nakhchivanski held the position of foreign minister. According to sources, the government—referred to as the "Nakhchivan Turkic Government"—held its first meeting on 25 January 1919.

=== Relations with Armenians ===
The inability to prevent Armenian advances and the flight of many ministers led to the decline of the Republic of Aras. With the departure of War Minister Ibrahim Bey Jahanjiroglu to Kars, the Republic of Aras effectively ceased to exist. Thereafter, the Nakhchivan district government sought military assistance from Iran and initiated preparations for negotiations with the Armenian authorities.

Iran dispatched a delegation of two Armenians and two Muslims to Nakhchivan in an effort to mediate between Azerbaijanis and Armenians. According to the memoirs of Ottoman officers Khalil Bey and Veysel Bey, the delegation arrived in Nakhchivan on 23 December and traveled to Erivan on 25 December. Simultaneously, under the leadership of Jafargulu Khan Nakhchivanski, the Nakhchivan District Government sent a delegation to Demirchi-Qushchu to propose a ceasefire to Colonel Dolukhanov. However, the delegation was arrested, and Dolukhanov launched a new Armenian offensive against the villages of Norashen and Yengija. This time, however, the Armenians encountered a well-trained and organized Azerbaijani armed detachment commanded by Colonel Kelbali Khan Nakhchivanski and Mashadi Aliaskar Agha. After two days of fighting, the Armenians were defeated and forced to retreat. They were also expelled from the villages of Sharur, which they had initially captured, as well as from the Qurd Gapisi pass. Armenian units regrouped in Davali, while Azerbaijani forces stationed themselves in Arazdayan. On 28 December, Kelbali Khan returned to Nakhchivan with his detachment. Following their setback in Sharur, Dolukhanov attempted to re-establish control over Vedibasar, but this time the Vedibasar population repelled the assault.

Subsequently, attempts to establish Armenian rule in the region with the support of the Entente forces triggered an uprising by the Nakhchivan population. In the clashes that followed, Nakhchivan forces were victorious. Meanwhile, American efforts to establish a neutral zone in the Sharur–Nakhchivan region also failed, as the Nakhchivan population refused to accept the project.

== See also ==
- Armenian–Azerbaijani war (1918–1920)

== Sources ==
- Hacıyev, İsmayıl (2010), Azərbaycan Xalq Cümhuriyyəti və Naxçıvan, Naxçıvan: Əcəmi Nəşriyyat-Poliqrafiya Birliyi
- Atnur, İbrahim Ether (1999), Muxtariyyat ərəfəsində Naxçıvan, NDU - Naxçıvan: «Qeyrət» nəşriyyatı
- Hovannisian, Richard (1982), The Republic of Armenia V 2 – From Versailles to London, 1919–1920, University of California Press, ASIN 0520041860
