= Feyzullah Mirza Qajar =

Prince of the Qajar dynasty

Feyzullah Mirza Qajar Фейзулла Мирза Каджар فیض الله میرزا قاجار
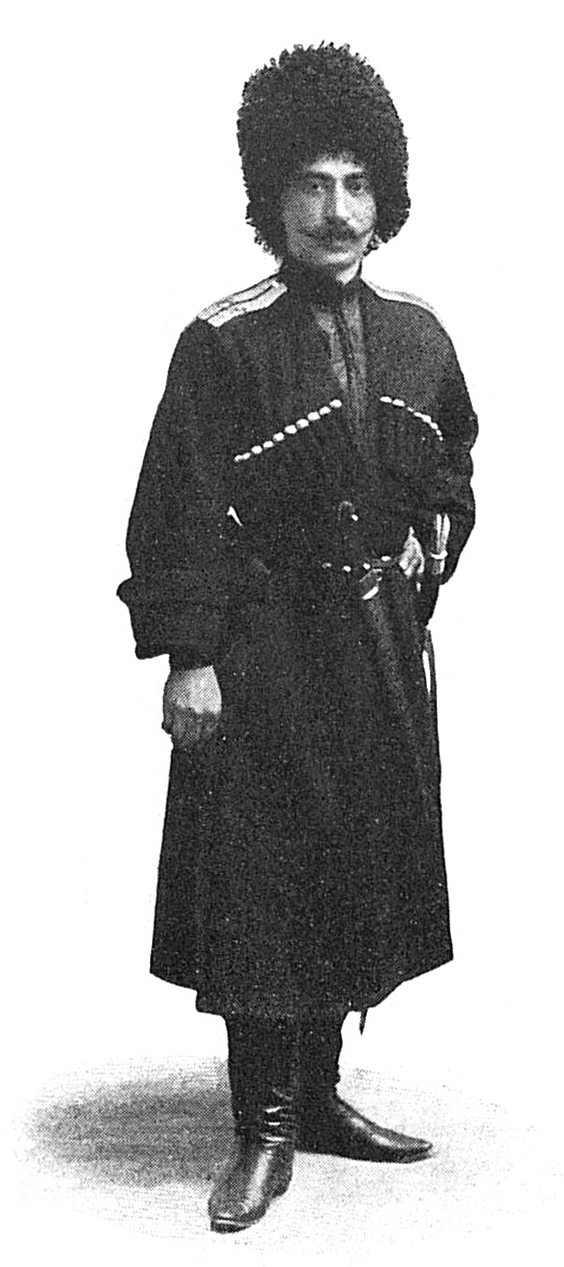
- Feyzulla Mirza Qajar in 1905
- Born: 15 December 1872; Shusha, Elisabethpol Governorate, Russian Empire
- Died: 1920 (aged 47–48); Boyuk Zira, Baku
- Military career
- Allegiance: (Russia) Russian Empire (Azerbaijan) ADR
- Branch: Cavalry
- Service years: 1891–1920
- Rank: Major General
- Commands: Chechen cavalry regiment, The 2nd Brigade of the Caucasian Native Cavalry Division, 1st Savage Division, Army Cavalry Division of the ADR
- Conflicts: Russo-Japanese War; First World War
- Awards: Order of St. George; Order of Saint Anna; Order of Saint Stanislaus

Feyzullah Mirza Qajar (Russian: Фейзулла Мирза Каджар; Persian: فیض الله میرزا قاجار; Azerbaijani: Feyzulla Mirzə Qacar) also Fazullah-Mirza Qajar (Russian: Фазулла-Мирза-Каджар; Persian: فضل الله میرزا قاجار) (b. December 15, 1872 - d. 1920) - was a prince of Iran's Qajar dynasty and a decorated Imperial Russian and Azerbaijani military commander, holding the rank of Major-General. In the Imperial Russian army, he was the commander of the 1st Caucasian Native Cavalry Division, and the commander of the Ganja garrison in the army of Azerbaijan Democratic Republic.

== Early life ==
He was born on 15 December 1872 to Shafi Khan Qajar in Shusha, Elisabethpol Governorate. He was a senior great-grandson of Bahman Mirza. He received general education in the Tbilisi Cadet Corps. Starting the military the service on 30 August 1891, he started his second education at the Nikolayev Cavalry School. After graduating from college in the 1st category, he was released on August 7, 1893 as a cornet to the 43rd Tver Dragoon Regiment. He was promoted to lieutenant rank on 15 March 1899. On November 20, 1901, he was appointed acting head of the regiment's weapons and non-combat team. March 15, 1903 promoted to headquarters captain.

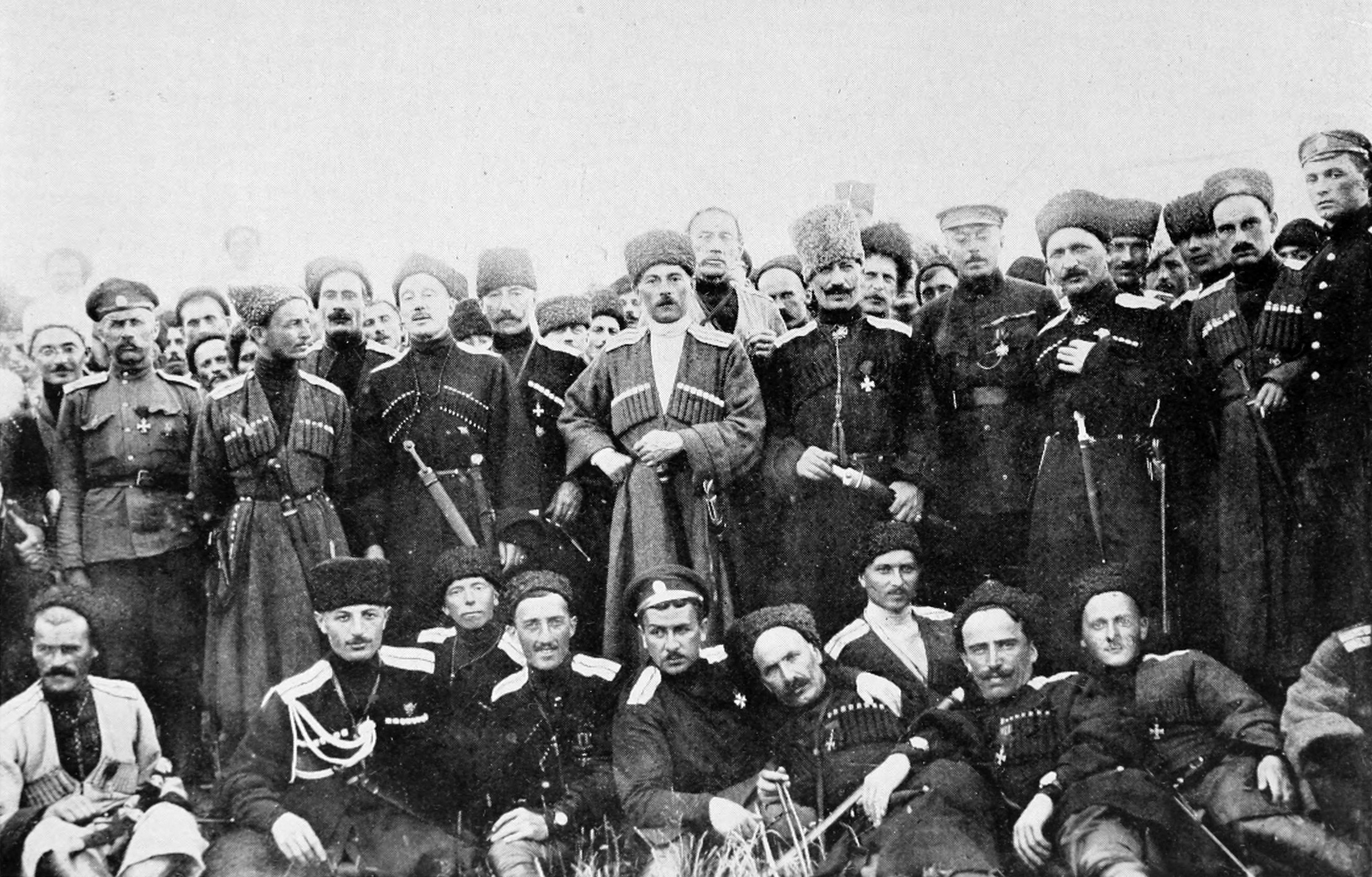
Feyzullah Qajar among the Savage Division, c. 1917

== Russo-Japanese war ==
After the outbreak of the Russo-Japanese War, then the staff captain of the 43rd Tver Dragoon Regiment, Feyzulla was transferred at the end of March 1904 to the 2nd Dagestani Horse Regiment and put under command of Colonel Huseyn Khan Nakhchivanski. As part of the regiment, he participated in raids and clashes, including the well-known attack of 2nd Dagestan cavalry regiment against Japanese positions near the village of Landungou on 14 January 1905, and was seriously wounded in the right leg. He was reported to be valiant and brave by his superiors. And was promoted to yesaul on same day. Towards end of the war, on March 21, 1906 he was appointed rittmeister and returned to the 43rd Tver Dragoon Regiment.

He was appointed as the commander of the 4th squadron of Russian Army on 16 November. He was a member of the regimental court since January 29. From June 19 to 28, he was at the headquarters of the Caucasian Cavalry Division "to examine health for being reckoned with the Emperor Alexander I's Committee on the wounded." He was assigned by committee to the 3rd class wounds. On August 26, 1912 for the successes in service, was promoted to the rank of lieutenant colonel. Later on April 18, 1913, Feyzulla was transferred to the 10th Novgorod Dragoon Regiment. He served as a junior staff officer of the 3rd squadron.

== World War I ==
He was sent to Lvov to be at the disposal of the commander of the 2nd cavalry corps, his former commander Huseyn Khan Nakhichivanski, this time to serve among Caucasian Native Cavalry Division on 27 November 1914. Soon after he was promoted to colonel on 5 January 1915. He rose to be second-in-command of Tatar Cavalry Regiment on March 4, 1915 replacing the commander of the Chechen cavalry regiment - Colonel Alexander Svyatopolk-Mirskiy, who died in battle. He was seriously wounded and evacuated to Russia after a battle near the village of Vali-Salchi in Romania on 9 December 1916. He returned to duty and took command of the Chechen cavalry regiment on 25 February 1917 after his treatment. On May 17, 1917, he was promoted to major general, and on May 30 he was appointed commander of the 2nd Brigade of the Caucasian Native Cavalry Division. He was the first commander of the division by 30 September.

== Azerbaijan Democratic Republic ==
In the spring and summer of 1918 he served in the Separate Azerbaijan Corps. In early July, the Separate Azerbaijan Corps was disbanded by the Turkish command and its units merged with the 5th Caucasian and 15th Çanakkale Turkish divisions to form Caucasian Islamic Army of Nuri Pasha. He was appointed cavalry inspector of the Caucasian Islamic Army. On 23 December 1918, Feyzullah Mirza was appointed commander of the equestrian division of the Azerbaijani army, later being appointed as the commander of the Ganja garrison on 9 January 1919, by order of the Minister of War, Samad Mehmandarov. His later fate is unknown. According to the Azerbaijani historian Shamistan Nazirli, after the Sovietization of Azerbaijan and the suppression of the anti-Soviet uprising in Ganja, Feyzulla Mirza Qajar was arrested, taken to Baku and executed by the Bolsheviks on the island of Nargin.

== Family ==
He was married to Khurshid Nakhchivanskaya (1894-1963) a singer in Azerbaijan State Opera and Ballet Theatre, daughter of Rahim khan Nakhchivanski, elder brother of Jamshid Nakhchivanski.

== Awards ==
- Order of St. Anne 4th rank with the inscription "for courage" (3 November 1904)
- Order of St. Stanislav 3rd rank with sword and ribbon (9 January 1905)
- Order of St. Anne 3rd rank with sword and ribbon
- "For the successes in struggles with the Japanese" (25 June 1905)
- Order of Lion and the Sun 3rd degree (28 January 1907)
- Order of St. Stanislav 2nd rank with sword (31 January 1915)
- Order of Saint Vladimir 4th rank with sword and ribbon (14 March 1915)
- Order of Saint Vladimir 3rd rank with sword (15 July 1915)
- Order of St. Anne 2nd rank with sword (9 September 1915)
- Order of St. George 4th rank with sword (17 October 1915)

== Sources in Russian ==
- Летопись войны с Японией, 1905 г., № 56, стр. 1103 (портрет)
- Брешко-Брешковский Н. Н. Дикая дивизия. — М.: Московская правда, 1991. Часть первая. «Под тремя золотыми львами».
- Бузун Ю. Г. Бой у села Бринь.
