= Khurshid Qajar =

Khurshid Qajar Xurşid Qacar
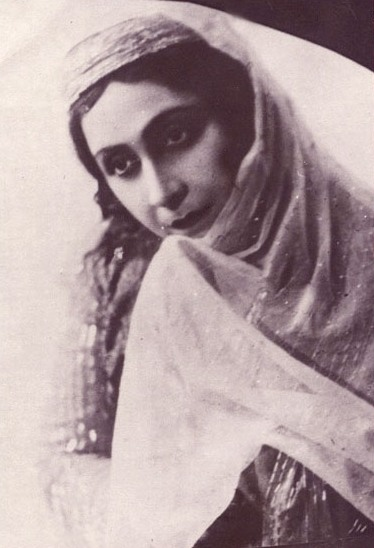

Background information
- Born: Khurshid Nakhchivanskaya; 1894; Nakhchivan, Russian Empire
- Died: Summer 1963 (aged 68–69) Baku, Azerbaijan Soviet Socialist Republic
- Genres: Opera
- Occupation: Opera singer

Khurshid Qajar née Nakhchivanskaya (Azerbaijani: Xurşid Qacar) was an Azerbaijani opera singer.

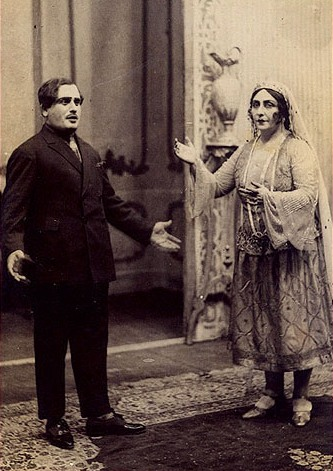
Khurshud Qajar as Gulchohra in Arshin Mal Alan in 1929

== Biography ==
She was born in 1894, Nakhchivan to Rahim Khan Nakhchivanski, an elder brother of Huseyn Khan Nakhchivanski and a member of Nakhchivanski family. She got her first education at Boarding School of Saint Nina at Baku. Being admitted to Moscow Conservatory in 1915, she was one of the first Azerbaijani women to get educated abroad. Her teacher at Conservatory was Umberto Masetti, Italian vocal pedagogue and Sergey Obukov, Russian opera singer of Bolshoi Theatre. After completing her education, she lived in Saint Petersburg for a while and later worked for Azerbaijan State Opera and Ballet Theatre in 1919-1934. She was a director of a small opera course functioning under Opera Theater in 1935.

She was known for her portrayals of Gulzar (in Shah Ismail opera by Muslum Magomayev); Khurshidbanu, Asya and Gulnaz (respectively in Shah Abbas and Khurshid Banu (1912), Arshin Mal Alan (1913) and If Not That One, Then This One (1910) - all by Uzeyir Hajibeyov) and Micaëla (Carmen by Georges Bizet).

She later worked for musical publications in Azernashr starting from 1935, simultaneously setting up a studio inside Azerbaijan State Opera and Ballet Theatre and preparing The Demon by Anton Rubinstein and The Tsar's Bride by Nikolai Rimsky-Korsakov for Azerbaijani stage with her students.

In the 30s, by the order of Uzeyir Hajibeyov, she instructed at that time still young composers Tofig Guliyev and Zakir Bagirov to record the notes of mugham maqams "Rast", "Zabul-Segah" and "Dugah" while Mirza Mansur Mansurov played them on tar.

She died in summer of 1963, Baku.

== Family ==
She was married to Feyzullah Mirza Qajar until 1920. Her second husband was Count Nikolai Nikolaievich Khudyakov. She had a son from her first marriage - Shafi, named after Shafi Khan Qajar, she had adoptive children from second marriage Nadir Aliyev-Khudyakov, Adelia Aliyeva-Khudyakova and Marina Khudyakova.
