= Battle of Nakhchivan =

- Part of Muslim Uprisings, Aras War and Armenian-Azerbaijani War
Date	mid-June 1919
Location	Nakhchivan, Republic of Aras, (present day Republic of Azerbaijan)
Result	Armenian victory: End of Aras War
Territorial changes	Capitulation and Annexation of Aras Republic by First Republic of Armenia

Belligerents
Armenia	Republic of Aras (Ottoman Empire) Ankara Government; Azerbaijan

Commanders and leaders
(First Republic of Armenia) Drastamat Kanayan	Jafargulu Khan Nakhchivanski

Strength
(First Republic of Armenia) 18,000	6,000–12,000

Casualties and losses
(First Republic of Armenia) Light	Heavy

The Battle of Nakhchivan was a battle that took place in Nakhchivan, during the Aras War. It was fought by the troops of the First Republic of Armenia, and troops of the Republic of Aras. The battle would be the decisive factor to the capitulation of the Republic of Aras, and its annexation by Armenia.

== Armenian offensive ==
The Armenian Offensive towards the city of Nakhchivan began in early June, as they advanced from south-western Kangarli with their highly moralised and professionally trained force of 18.000 Armenian infantrymen under the command of Drastamat Kanayan.The Armenians swiftly marched through the south of the Nakhchivan region in order to reach the city, following the railway within the region and defeating numerous smaller units of the Aras army, usually numbering armies in the one thousands composing of ethnic Azerbaijanis.The Armenian army would reach the city of Nakhchivan by mid-June, attacking it in well organised hit and run attacks before beginning a direct march into the city with 18.000 Armenian infantrymenThe smaller Azerbaijani army stood little to no chance against the much larger and better trained Armenian one, and within only days of fighting the Azerbaijanis were forced to surrender, as the city would effectively be in Armenian hands following the battle.

== Aftermath ==
Following the Battle, Drastamat Kanayan met with Kalb Ali Khan Nakhichevanskii in the city, where they would negotiate the terms for the capitulation of the Republic of Aras. The negotiations would result in the direct annexation of all territories by the Republic of Aras, these territories were entirely the region of Nakhchivan, this would also mark the quelling of the Muslim uprisings in Armenia.
