= Karim Khan Iravanski =

Azerbaijani military officer (1885–1919)

- Azerbaijani: Kərim xan Abbasqulu xan oğlu İrəvanski
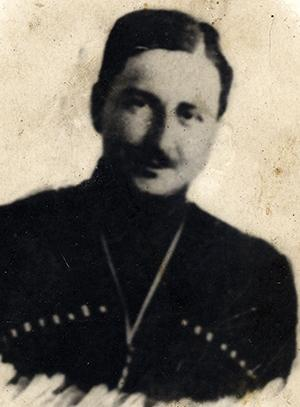
- Born: Karim Khan Iravanski; November 15, 1885; Iravan, Erivan uezd, Erivan Governorate, Russian Empire
- Died: October 9, 1919 (aged 33); Nalchik
- Military career
- Rank: Colonel
- Conflicts: World War I
- Awards: Order of Saint Anna (3); Order of Saint Stanislaus; The fourth class of the Order of St. Vladimir (with swords and bow); Order of the Star of Romania; Order of Glory Ribbon Bar

Karim Khan Iravanski, Karim Khan Iravanli or Karim Abbasgulu Khan Iravanski (November 15, 1885, Iravan – October 9, 1919, Nalchik) — military officer of the Russian Empire and Azerbaijan Democratic Republic, colonel.

He participated in the First World War. He was awarded with the fourth class of the Order of St. Anna, with the inscription "For Bravery" on it and with the third class of the Order of St. Stanislaus (with swords and bow) in 1915. In 1916, he was awarded with the third class of the Order of St. Anna (with swords and bow). Additionally, in 1917, he was awarded with the fourth degree of the Order of St. Vladimir (with swords and bow) by the order of the army of the South-Western Front, with the second class of the Order of St. Anna (with swords) by order of the Fourth Army, with the Order of the Star of Romania by King Ferdinand I of Romania and by order of the army and navy, he was awarded with the highest military award – Order of Glory Ribbon Bar.

He came to Nakhchivan during the Azerbaijan Democratic Republic. He led volunteer fighters to protect the local population from the attacks of Armenian attacks. He was appointed assistant to the governor for military affairs in the General-Governorship of South-West Azerbaijan, which was established in 1919.

He fought against the Bolsheviks as part of the Kabardin Cavalry Regiment in the White movement.

== Life and education ==
Karim Khan was born on November 15, 1885, in Iravan. His father, Abbasgulu Khan was the heir of Huseynali Khan Sardar who was the descendant of Iravan Khans. Abbasgulu Khan was the head of the Iravan City Duma in 1886–1899. Karim Khan Iravanski went to study at Nikolaevskaya Cavalry school located in St. Petersburg. He graduated from this school in 1907.

== Military service ==
=== First years of the service ===
After graduating from the Nikolaevskaya Cavalry school in 1907, he received the military rank of cornet and began serving in the 17th Nizhegorod Dragoon Regiment located in Tbilisi. In 1908, he was sent on a mission to the cuirassier regiment named after Maria Fyodorovna. From May 1909, he was officially assigned to the regiment. He served in this regiment until August 1912.

==== Duel ====
On April 12, 1912, in the city of Gatchina, news spread that two officers, the lieutenant of the Cuirassier regiment, Karim Khan Iravanski and Navy Lieutenant Lev Lvovich Girard de Sukanto who was the son of the commander of the Cuirassier regiment, Major-General Lev Fyodorovich Girard de Sukanto, were going to duel. These two officers, who clashed on a personal matter, appealed to the Society of officers of the Cuirassir regiment and the court of naval mediators of the Baltic fleet regarding their desire to duel. Both institutions decided that the dispute will be resolved only by a duel.

The parties gathered in the Prioratsk park in the morning of April 25. The participants of the duel, their seconds (two officers from the Cuirassir regiment from the Iravanski side, two naval officers from the Sukanton side), representatives of the Baltic fleet's naval mediation court and A. Ivanov and V. Pickel (two doctors from the Cuirassir regiment) were present here.

Karim Khan, who fired the first shot in the duel, wounded Sukanto in his right chest. After that, doctors and paramedics approached him and provided the first aid. Later, after being bandaged at the medical station of the Cuirassir regiment, he was taken to the Warsaw railway station and sent to Petersburg from there. Although the wound is quite severe, they could heal it. After that, Lev Lvovich Girard de Sucanton served in the army for a long time. After retirement, he lived in Harbin, China and died there in 1934.

=== In World War I ===
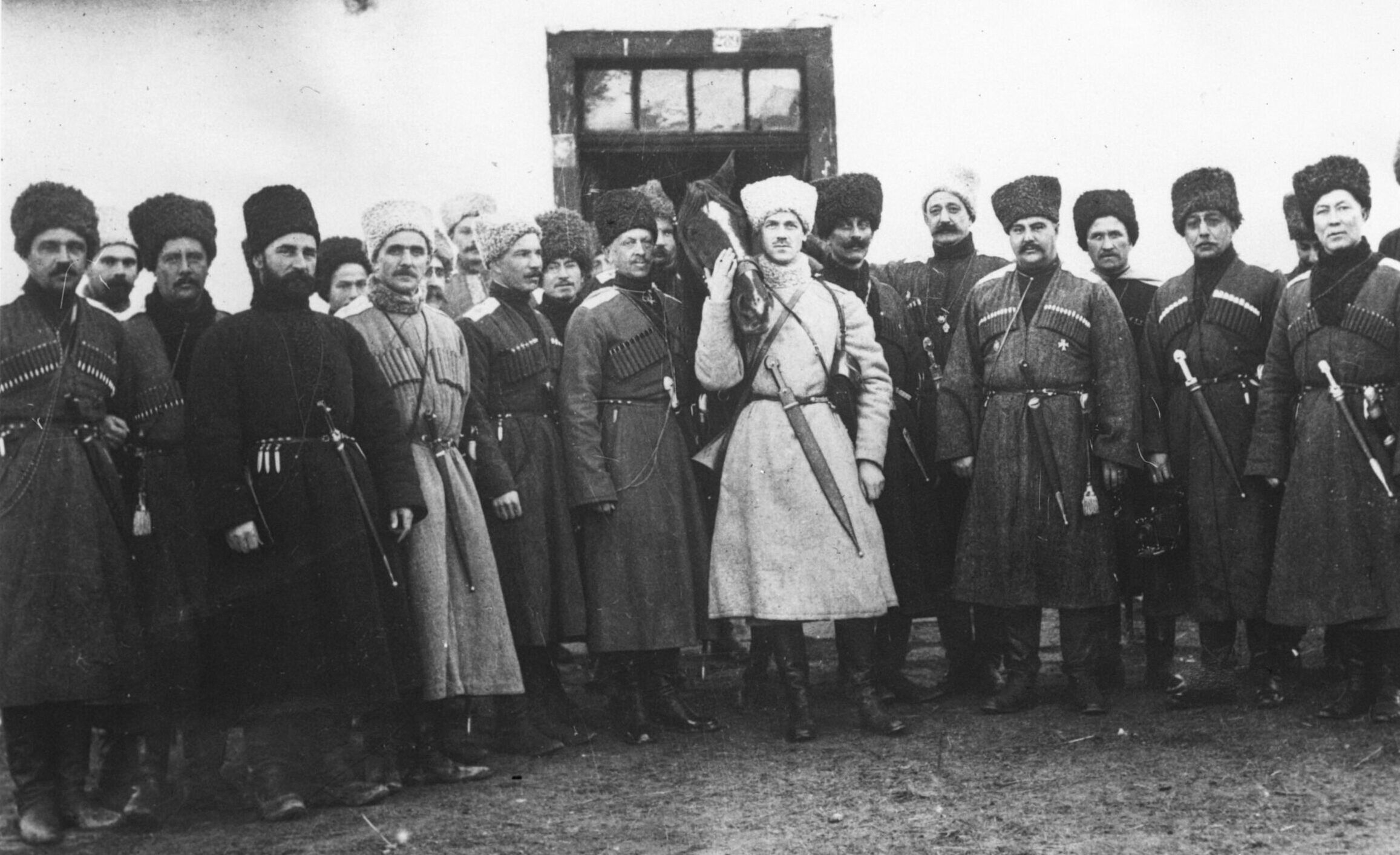
Mikhail Romanov with the Kabardin Cavalry Regiment. It is assumed that Karim Khan Iravanski was the one on his left.

When the First World War began, Karim Khan Iravanski was in the military rank of lieutenant. In August 1914, he was sent to the Kabardin Cavalry Regiment of the Caucasian Cavalry Division. Arriving at the duty station on August 29, he was appointed temporary adjutant of the regiment by the commander of the regiment, Colonel Illarion Vorontsov-Dashkov. By order No. 6 issued on September 3, 1914, lieutenant Khan Iravanski was appointed adjutant of the regiment. Karim Khan Iravanski had a close friendship with Mikhail Romanov, the younger brother of Nicholas II, who was the commander of the Wild Division at the time. On January 9, 1915, for the battle that took place at night around the village of Vetlino, Chief of staff Khan Iravanski was awarded the Order of St. Anna of the fourth degree with the inscription "For Bravery".

On February 17, 1915, he was presented to the leadership to be awarded with the Golden Weapon for Bravery for his distinction in the night battle that took place near the village of Maidan at the foot of the Carpathian Mountains (in present-day Ukraine). It was written in the presentation:

Chief of staff Khan Iravanski was sent to a particularly important task in the night battle near Meydan village on February 17, 1915. He was assigned to restore contact with the Kabardin Cavalry Regiment under my command and the right flank of General Stakhovich's detachment. As the firing squad chain advanced through the thick forest, it lost contact with neighboring squads, which put the entire squad in a dangerous situation. Chief of staff Khan Iravanski successfully performed the task assigned to him, risking his life under the deadly fire of the enemy. In spite of everything, he went to scout the enemy's positions, came within 50 paces of the Austrians' trenches, conveyed their positions and other information and it was of great help to the entire detachment.

However, the presentation of the commander of the Kabardin Cavalry Regiment was rejected by the Georgievsky Duma. On August 26, 1915, by order of the commander of the IX Army of the Southwestern Front, General Lechitsky, "for his distinction in the battle with the enemy from December 1, 1914 to July 1, 1915" with the Order of St. Stanislaus (with swords and bow) of the fourth degree (with swords and a bow), on March 19, 1917, by the order of the army of the South-Western Front, with the Order of St. Vladimir of the fourth degree (with swords and a bow), on March 25, 1917, of the Fourth Army commander of the 4th hundred of Kabardin Cavalry Regiment Rittmeister Karim Khan Iravansky is awarded the Order of St. Anna of the second degree (with swords) for his distinction in the battle against the enemy. On July 27, 1917, Karim Khan was given the military rank of Rittmeister. On July 27, 1917, he was awarded the Order of the Star of Romania by King Ferdinand I of Romania. On September 29 of the same year, Karim Khan Iravanski was again sent to military service in Kabardin Cavalry Regiment.

In August 1917, he participated in the march of the Wild Division to Petrograd. By order of the army and navy, on October 8, 1917, captain Karim Khan Iravanski was awarded the military award – the George weapon. He arrived in the North Caucasus in October 1917 with the Kabardin Cavalry Regiment. In November of the same year, Karim Khan protected the local population from bandit attacks in the village of Akhlovo (now Nizhniy Kurp) in Little Kabardia.

=== In Azerbaijan Democratic Republic ===
Karim Khan arrived in Nakhchivan at the end of 1918. From the notes in the order No. 364 issued on January 28, 1919, it is known that Karim Khan had the rank of colonel and the number of volunteer fighters under his command was more than 1000 people. In this order, it was mentioned that the combat unit led by him was subordinate to the headquarters headed by Lt. Col. Kalbali Khan Nakhchivanski. It was even written that his warriors had two cannons. It was noted that the unit commanded by Karim Khan showed great bravery in the battle with the Armenians. In the information he gave to the center as the commander of the Sharur district, it was said:

December 23, 1918. The content of the phone call given by Karim Khan, the commander-in-chief of Sharur district: "French representatives are sitting in Iravan. The people of the Muslim villages have recently been disarmed and surrendered by the Armenians without war. The Armenians are currently punishing them. They are arresting and executing young, knowledgeable and respectable Muslims.

By the decree of the Azerbaijan Democratic Republic on February 28, 1919, the governor-general of South-West Azerbaijan was established, and Karim Khan Iravanski was appointed as the assistant of the governor-general for military affairs. Later, he went to Kabardia with his brother.

=== In White movement ===
In the summer and autumn of 1919, he served in the military as Rittmeister in the Kabardin Cavalry Division, II Kabardin Cavalry Regiment of the South Russian Armed Forces. He temporarily led the regiment. In his telegram to Nalchik at the end of August 1919, he provided information about the destruction of the 3rd Red Horse Regiment of the Bolsheviks on August 12 and the escape of the survivors, as well as the capture of 2 machine guns and many firearms and bullets. On August 30, 1919, he sent a telegram from the Veliko Knyajeski station, and reported that they attacked the Bolsheviks around Volgograd, captured 600 prisoners, 5 machine guns, and destroyed a large number of Bolsheviks on August 24.

== Family ==
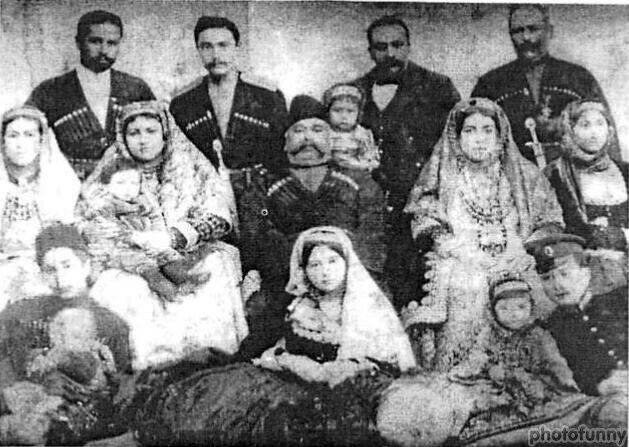
Abbasgulu Khan Iravanski (in the center) with his family

His father, Abbasgulu Khan was one of the heirs of Huseynali Khan Sardar, a descendant of Iravan Khans. Abbasgulu Khan's father, Mohubali Khan was Sardar's grandson. In 1886–1899, he was town councillor of the Iravan City Duma, and in 1904–1906 he was the honorary representative of one of the Russian-Tatar schools in Iravan.

His mother Tarlan Khanum is the daughter of General Ismayil Khan Nakhchivanski-Kangerli from Nakhchivan.

His brother Aga Khan Iravanski was elected to the İravan City Duma in 1904, and to the First State Duma of the Russian Empire in 1906. In 1919, he was the chairman of the Iravan Muslim National Council.

Karim Khan Iravanski first married Inna Herbel, the cousin of Huseyn Khan Nakhchivanski's wife. However, no child was born from this marriage. On January 11, 1918, he married for the second time with Shamside Kumukovna Aydabulova, a representative of a Balkar noble family from Nalchik district.

== Awards ==
Orders awarded for the bravery in the battles in the First World War:

- — On January 9, 1915, he was awarded with the fourth class of the Order of St. Anna, with the inscription "For Bravery" on it.
- — On August 26, 1915, he was awarded with the third class of the Order of St. Stanislaus (with swords and bow).
- — On April 2, 1916, he was awarded with the third class of the Order of St. Anna (with swords and bow).
- — On March 19, 1917, he was awarded with the fourth degree of the Order of St. Vladimir (with swords and bow) by the order of the army of the South-Western Front.
- — On March 25, 1917, he was awarded with the second class of the Order of St. Anna (with swords) by order of the Fourth Army.
- — On July 27, 1917, he was awarded with the Order of the Star of Romania by King Ferdinand I of Romania.
- — On October 8, 1917, by order of the army and navy, he was awarded with the highest military award – Order of Glory Ribbon Bar.

== Death ==
On October 9, 1919, he was killed in one of the battles on the Volgograd front in Volga region. Karim Khan's body was brought to the city of Nalchik by the help of front command and buried there in the Volniy Aul cemetery.

== See also ==
- Nakhchivanski

== Literature ==
- Naghdaliyev, Farhad (2006). Khans of Nakhchivan in the Russian Empire (PDF). Moscow: Новый Аргумент. p. 432. ISBN 5-903224-01-6.
- Zeynalov, Adgar (2011). Iravan intellectuals (PDF). Baku: Mütərcim Tərcümə və Nəşriyyat-Poliqrafiya Mərkəzi. p. 400. ISBN 978-9952-28-066-1. Archived from the original (PDF) on September 20, 2017.
- News of the Historical Genealogical Society of Azerbaijan. Baku: Adiloğlu. 2010. p. 224.
- Farhad Jabbarov (2014). Azerbaijan during the First World War. Collection of scientific articles (PDF). Baku: Ziya.
