= Nakhchivanski =

- Noble Family
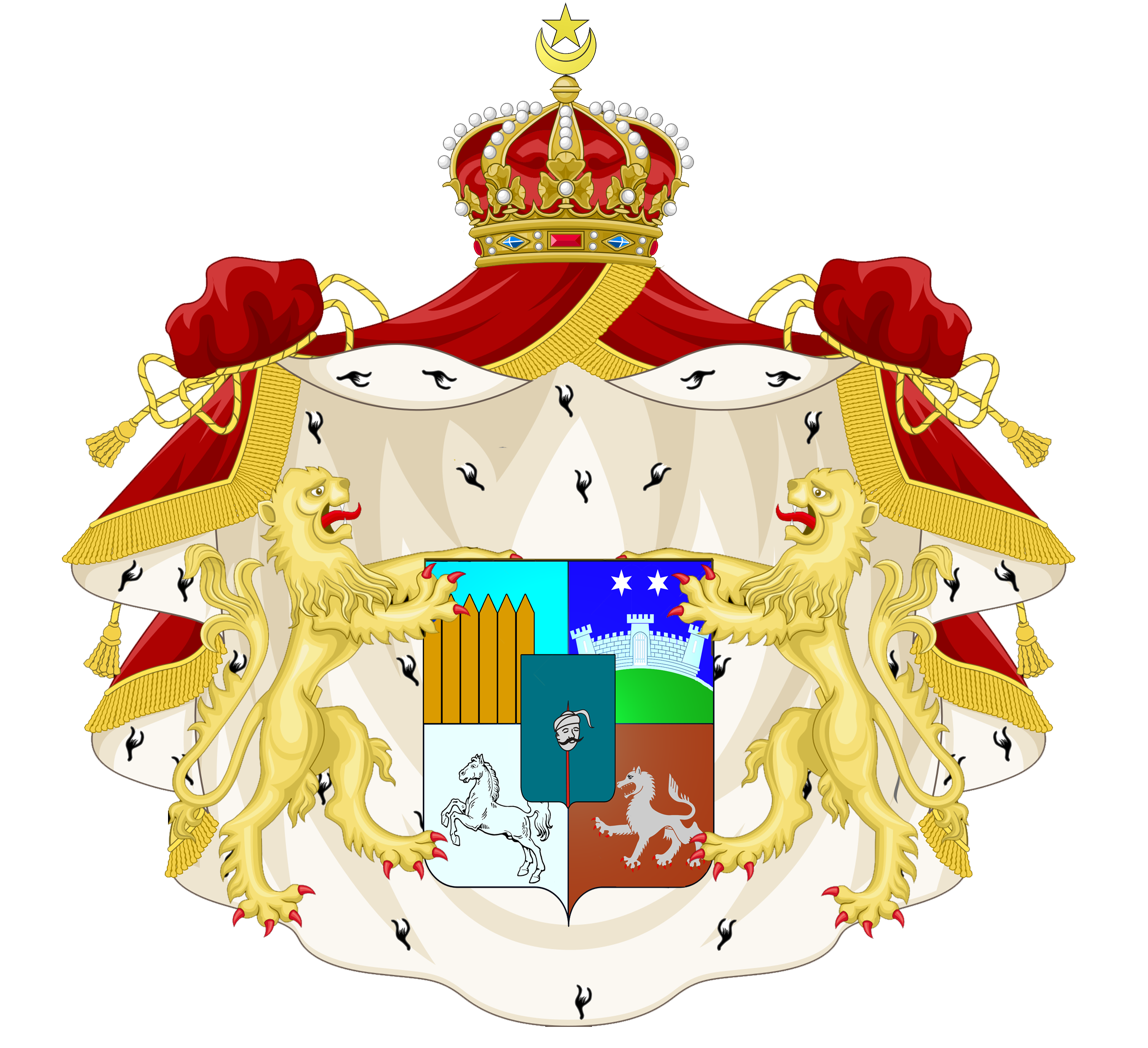
- Parent family: Kangarli dynasty
- Current region: Iran; Azerbaijan; The Netherlands; Canada; United States of America
- Current head: Unknown
- Connected members: Huseyn Khan Nakhchivanski; Jafargulu Khan Nakhchivanski
- Connected families: Qajar dynasty

The House of Nakchivanski (Russian: Нахичеванский, Azerbaijani: Naxçıvanskilər), also spelled Naxcivanski and Nakhitchevansky, is a noble family of Azerbaijani origin with subsequent branches established in Russia and Iran. They have provided famous generals and military personnel, one of them - Huseyn Khan Nakhchivanski was the only Muslim to serve as General-Adjutant of the H.I.M. Retinue.

== Background ==
The Nakhchivanski family is a cadet branch of the Kangarli dynasty, itself a part of the Ustajlu tribe. Ehsan Khan Kangarli was the first member of the dynasty to adopt a Russified surname, thus establishing his own branch. They were intermarried with Bahmani family of Qajar dynasty and Makinsky family of Maku Khanate. They were the largest landowners in Nakhchivan uyezd.

== Present day ==
After the Soviet takeover of Azerbaijan, Christian members of the Nakhchivanski family mostly emigrated to Europe and beyond, while Muslim members stayed back and changed their surnames in order to flee persecution, such as famous opera singer Khurshid Qajar, who adopted her husband's surname even after his death; or immigrated to Iran to serve in Qajar Army. A Christian branch descended from Huseyn Khan Nakhchivanski lives in United States of America.

== Notable members ==
- Huseyn Khan Nakhchivanski – General of the cavalry, General-Adjutant of the H.I.M. Retinue.
- Jamshid Khan Nakhchivanski – Russian Imperial, Azerbaijani and Soviet military commander. He rose to the rank of Combrig (equivalent to Brigadier General) in the Soviet Army.
- Jafargulu Khan Nakhchivanski – Mayor of Nakhchivan, later honorary magistrate of Erivan, head of Republic of Aras.
- Khurshid Qajar – Azerbaijani opera singer.
