= Jamshid Nakhchivanski =

Russian Imperial, Azerbaijani and Soviet military commander

Jamshid Nakhichevanski
- Cəmşid Naxçıvanski
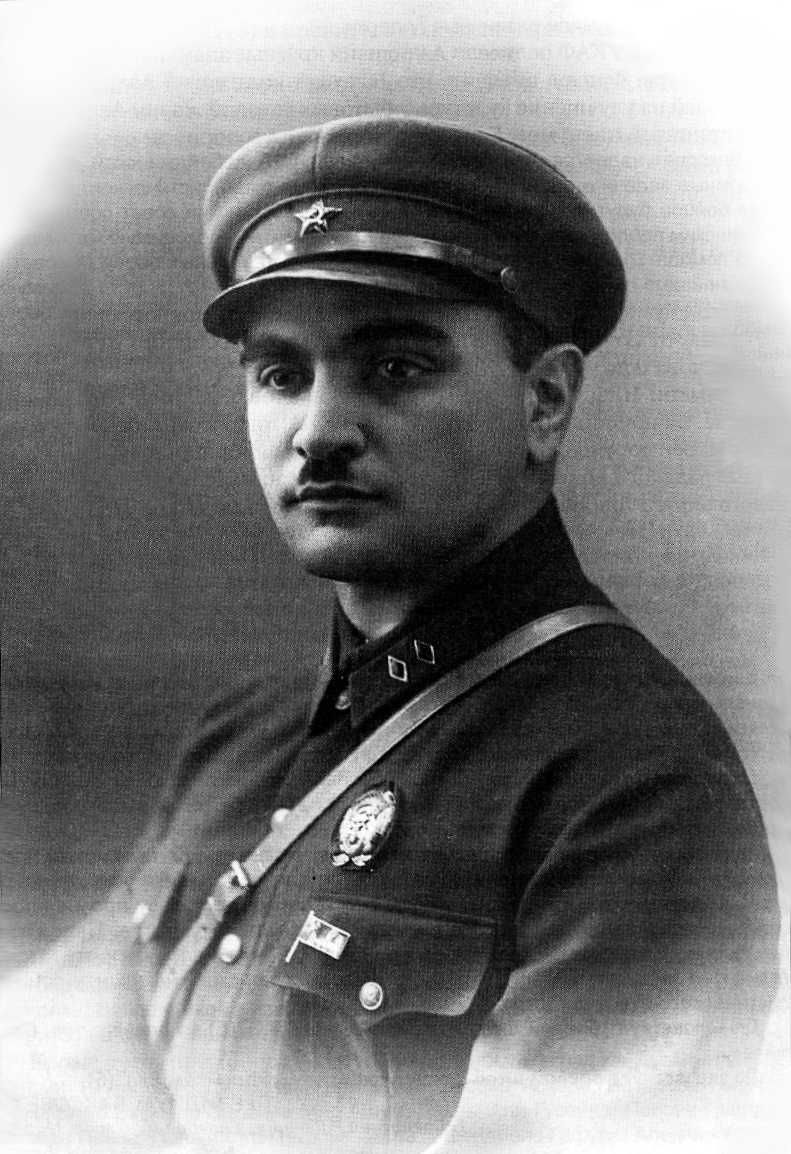
- Comdiv Jamshid Nakhichevanski
- Born: August 23, 1895; Nakhichevan, Erivan Governorate
- Died: August 26, 1938 (aged 43); Moscow, Russian SFSR
- Military career
- Allegiance: Russian Empire; Azerbaijan Democratic Republic; USSR
- Branch: Imperial Russian Army (Azerbaijan) Azerbaijani National Army; Red Army
- Rank: Combrig
- Conflicts: World War I; Armenian–Azerbaijani War; Battle of Baku
- Awards: Order of the Red Banner of Labour, Order of Saint Stanislaus (2nd and 3rd degrees), Order of St. Anna, Cross of St. George (4th degree)

Jamshid Jafargulu oglu Nakhchivanski (Azerbaijani: Cəmşid Cəfərqulu oğlu Naxçıvanski; August 23, 1895 – August 26, 1938), also known as Jamshid Khan Nakhichevanski, was a Russian Imperial, Azerbaijani and Soviet military commander. He rose to the rank of Combrig (equivalent to Brigadier General) in the Soviet Army.

== Early life ==
Jamshid Nakhchivanski was born to the family of retired Russian Imperial Rittmeister Jafargulu Khan Nakhchivanski who was the brother of General Adjutant Huseyn Khan Nakhchivanski. The Nakhchivanskis came from roots of Kangarli Oghuz Turks tribes descendants of which ruled the Nakhchivan Khanate. At the age of seven, his mother Farrantaj-hanim taught him to write in Azerbaijani and his nanny taught him Russian and French. In 1904, he was admitted to Tiflis Cadet Corps graduating in 1911.

== Service in the army ==
=== Imperial Russian Army ===
On August 30, 1914, he started his service as junker of Yelizavetgrad Cavalry School. Having graduated from the four-month 1st-grade intensive course, he was appointed praporshchik and assigned to Azerbaijani reserve cavalry regiment of the Caucasian Native Mounted Division which was formed from Muslim volunteers from Caucasus and Transcaucasus. On June 14, 1915, Jamshid Khan was transferred to the regiment and on August 22 he was promoted to the rank of Cornet. On February 14, 1916, he was awarded his first military award of Order of Saint Anna of 4th degree. On 26 January 1917 Jamshid Khan was decorated with St. George sword for defeating the enemy and leading a cavalry attack, despite being wounded twice. In March 1917, Jamshid Khan was awarded the Order of Saint Stanislaus of 2nd degree for his bravery on Romanian front. On April 15 he was awarded the Order of St. Anna of the 3rd degree and on August 22 with Cross of St. George of 4th degree.

On October 30, 1917, Nakhchivanski was conferred the rank of stabs-rittmeister, and his regiment was made a part of the Russian Caucasus Army and relocated to the Caucasus. At the end of 1917, at Special Transcaucasian Committee orders, the formation of Muslim (Azerbaijani) Corps under Lieutenant General Ali-Agha Shikhlinski's command began.

=== Azerbaijani Army (ADR) ===
By end of May 1918, the establishment of the corps was completed. After the declaration of independence of Azerbaijan Democratic Republic on June 26, 1918, the corpus was transferred to Azerbaijani Army corps. In July 1918, the corps dissolved and were partially integrated with newly arrived Turkish 5th Caucasian and 15th Chanahkala divisions and newly formed Caucasian army of Islam led by Nuru Pasha. During the battles in the outskirts of Goychay on June 27 - July 1, 1918, the Army of Islam destroyed the 1st Caucasian corps of the Red Army. Jamshid Khan took part in the Battle of Baku against the Centrocaspian Dictatorship and Armenian Dashnaks. Baku was liberated on September 15, 1918.

In the Azerbaijani Army, Jamshid Khan was the commander of the 1st company of 1st Azerbaijani regiment and assistant to regiment commander. On March 24, 1920 Minister of Defense of Azerbaijan Democratic Republic Samad bey Mehmandarov appointed Lieutenant Colonel Jamshid Khan Commander of 2nd Karabakh cavalry regiment. While in Karabakh he participated in liberation of Shusha.

=== Soviet Army ===
After the establishment of Soviet rule in Azerbaijan, the Karabakh division was transferred under command of the Red Army. Following the suppression of the 1920 Ganja revolt, Bolsheviks arrested many Azerbaijani officers including Nakhchivanski. He was kept in prison on Nargin island in Baku Bay but was released in two months to serve in the administration of Red Commanders School. He then served as Commander of the Azerbaijani Rifle Division from 1921 to 1931.

On February 22, 1931, he was called to Red Army corps in Tbilisi where he was arrested and accused of treason and anti-Soviet espionage. On September 30, 1931, he was sentenced to death but Sergo Ordzhonikidze prevented the execution by taking the issue to Politburo where Joseph Stalin ordered to release Nakhchivanski provided that he wouldn't work and live in Caucasus. Nakhchivanski was rehabilitated in the army and sent to Frunze Military Academy for further studies. In 1933, he completed his studies and stayed at the academy to teach military tactics. On December 5, 1935, by the order of People's Commissar of Defense Kliment Voroshilov he was conferred the rank of Combrig.

== Death ==
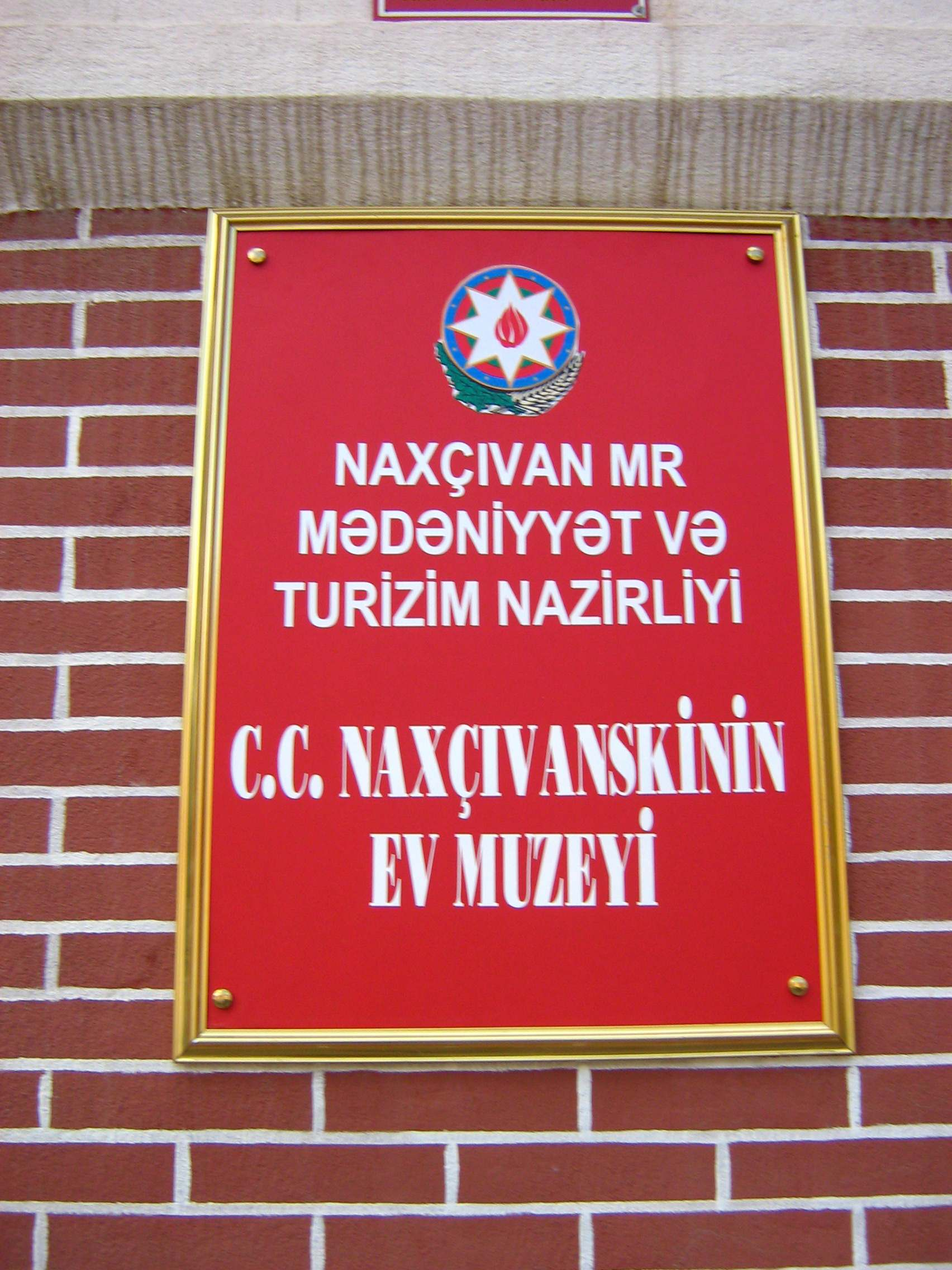
Home museum of Jamshid Nakhichevanski in Nakhchivan

During the Great Purge, Nakhchivanski was arrested on May 20, 1938, and was charged with anti-Soviet activities and espionage on August 26, 1938, in Lefortovo prison. He was sentenced to death and confiscation of all personal property. Nakhchivanski was executed by firing squad. His body was transported and buried in Kommunarka shooting ground, an NKVD burial site for repression victims, 26 km outside of Moscow. On December 22, 1956, he was rehabilitated.

In 2007, 112th anniversary of Jamshid Nakhchivanski was celebrated in Azerbaijan. Streets in Baku and Nakhchivan as well as Jamshid Nakhchivanski Military Lyceum were named after Jamshid Khan Nakhchivanski. A house museum in Nakhchivan was also opened by Azerbaijani government.

== See also ==
- Huseyn Khan Nakhchivanski
- Jafargulu Khan Nakhchivanski
- Azerbaijani Armed Forces
