= Shafi Khan Qajar =

Prince of Persia's Qajar dynasty

His Serene Highness Shafi Khan Qajar Шафи-Хан Каджар Şəfi xan Qacar
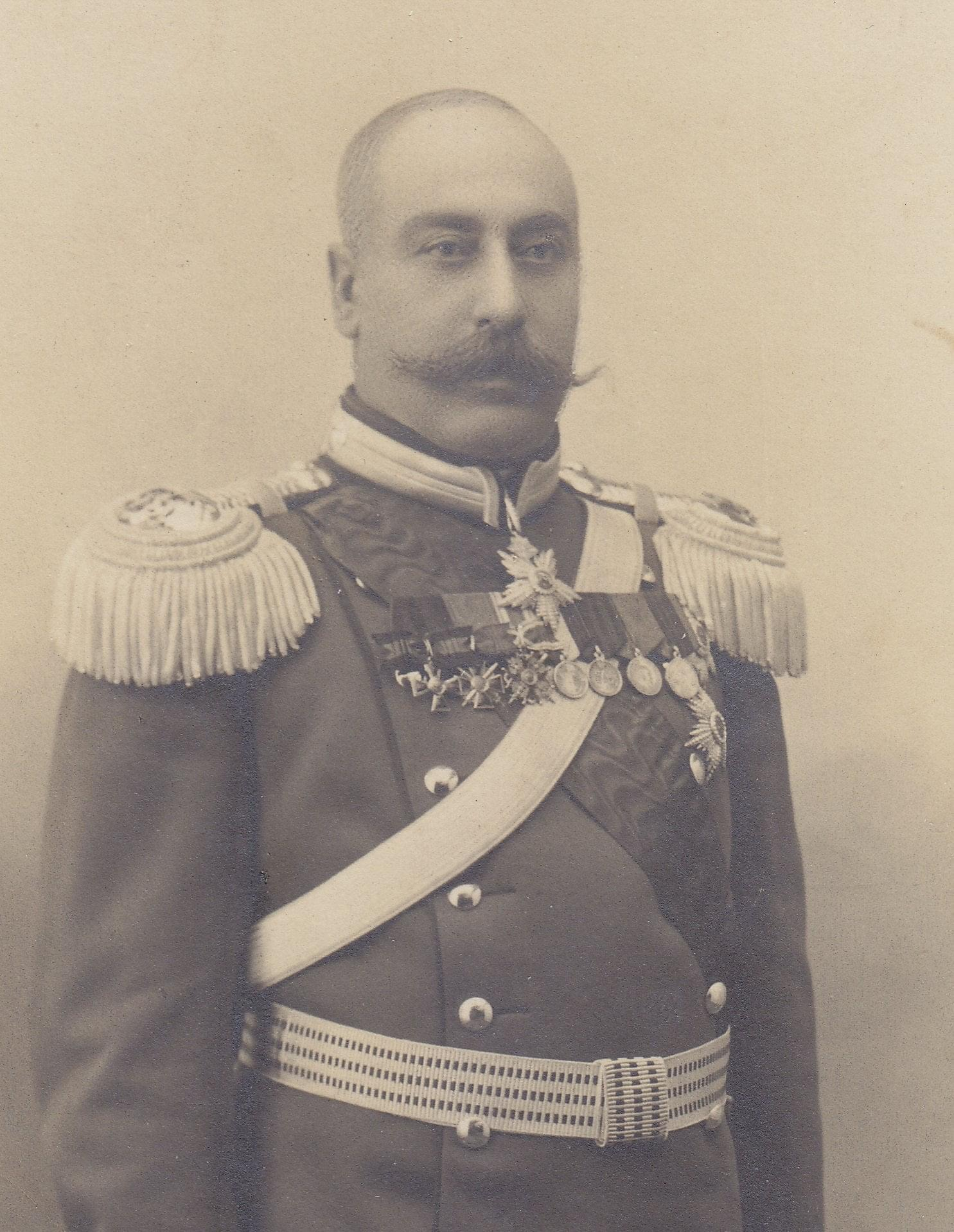
- Prince Shafi Khan Mirza as commander of the Russian Dragoons regiment
- Born: 19 April 1853; Shusha, Russian Empire
- Died: 2 January 1909 (aged 55); Saint Petersburg, Russian Empire
- Relatives: Feyzullah Mirza Qajar (son)
- Military career
- Allegiance: (Russia) Russian Empire
- Branch: Cavalry
- Service years: 1874—1908
- Rank: Major General
- Commands: 46th Pereyaslavl Dragoon Regiment
- Conflicts: Russo-Turkish War; Battle of Geok Tepe

HSH Shafi Khan Qajar (Russian: Шафи-Хан Каджар) was a prince of Persia's Qajar dynasty and a decorated Imperial Russian commander, having the rank of Major-General.

== Early life ==
He was born on 19 March 1853 to Jalal ud-din Mirza Qajar (second son of Bahman Mirza)and Nawbahar Khanum in Shusha (then part of Shamakhi Governorate of Russian Empire). He was home-schooled and graduated from the Officer Cavalry School course. He started the military service as a cornet in the cavalry on 12 April 1874 and on July 7, 1874, he was already rose to second-in-command of the 13th Yerevan Grenadier Regiment.

== Military career ==
He joined to the army in Russo-Turkish War of 1877-1878 between 12 April and 17 November 1877. He participated in various battles and skirmishes, including the bombardment of Ardahan and the assault on the Gelaverdi Heights (4 May), the Capture of Ardahan (5 May), the repulsion of the Turks from Kars and the affair at Melin-Key (28 May), the repulsion of the Turks from the northern forts of Kars (May 30), the bombardment of the northeastern forts of Kars-Arab, Karadag and Mukhlis (4 June), the affair at Kizil-Gul (September 19), the battle with the Turkish army on the Alacadağ heights and at the mountains of Lesser and Greater Yahni (20-22 September), taking advanced Turkish positions from the villages of Hacıveli and Subatan, cavalry charge at Mount İnahtepesi (27 September), etc. He was promoted to poruchik rank on 1 August 1877 after several battles.

He also took part in Battle of Geok Tepe from 22 July 1880 to 25 May 1881, for which he was awarded silver medals and promoted to staff captain. After being promoted to rittmeister on 6 August 1891, he was again sent to the Officer Cavalry School for a two-year course. He served in 49th Arkhangelsk Dragoon Regiment, 55th Finland Dragoon Regiment, and 46th Pereyaslavl Dragoon Regiment later in life. He was sent to Copenhagen as the deputy of Russian delegation during the burial ceremony of Christian IX - from 27 January to 11 February 1906. Eventually, he was promoted to Major General on 31 December 1908 and was sent to pension.

== Death ==
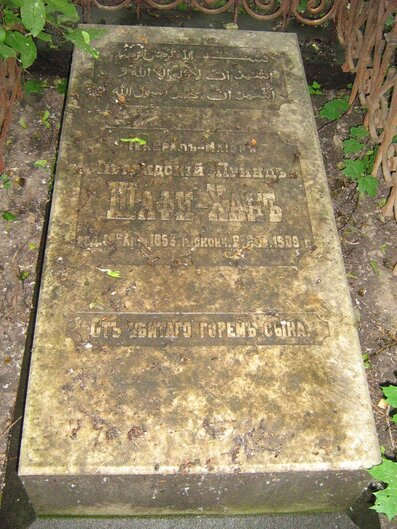
Tomb of Shafi Khan in Saint Petersburg

He was accused with embezzlement of public money 1909. He shot himself on 2 January 1909 in St. Petersburg, considering this to be a stain on honor. He was buried in the Muslim cemetery of St. Petersburg (now in the territory of the Novo-Volkovsky cemetery). His funeral ceremony was attended by Huseyn Khan Nakhchivanski, Aleksander Mirza Qajar as well as staff of Persian embassy.

== Family ==
His wife's name is unknown, but he was already widowed by 1886, according to military records. His only son was Feyzullah Mirza Qajar, who, like his father, served in the Imperial Russian army (and later in that of the Azerbaijan Democratic Republic).

== Honorific Titles ==
- Illustrious Highness (28 November 1889)
- His Serene Highness (22 January 1908)

== Awards ==
- Order of St. Stanislav 3rd rank with sword and ribbon (17 June 1881)
- Order of St. Anne 3rd rank with sword and ribbon (17 June 1881)
- Order of Lion and the Sun 3rd degree (30 October 1894)
- Silver medal in memory of the reign of Emperor Alexander III (4 January 1897)
- Silver medal in memory of campaigns in Central Asia 1853–1895 (10 November 1897)
- Order of St. Vladimir 4th rank with ribbon (22 September 1899)
- Order of Lion and the Sun 2nd degree (12 January 1902)
- Order of St. Vladimir 3rd rank with ribbon (20 November 1905)
