= 2nd Cavalry Corps (Russian Empire) =

- Country: Russian Empire
- Allegiance: Imperial Russian Army
- Engagements: World War I

The 2nd Cavalry Corps was a cavalry corps in the Imperial Russian Army.

== Part of ==
- 9th Army: 1915
- 7th Army: 1916–1917
- 8th Army: 1917

== Commanders ==
- Lieutenant General Huseyn Khan Nakhchivanski: 1914–1915
- Lieutenant General Georgy Ottonovich Rauch: 1915
- Lieutenant General Grand Duke Michael Alexandrovich of Russia: 1916–1917
- Lieutenant General W. H. Roop: 1917
- Lieutenant General K. A. Tumanov: 1917
