= Jafargulu Khan Nakhchivanski =

Azerbaijani politician (1859–1929)

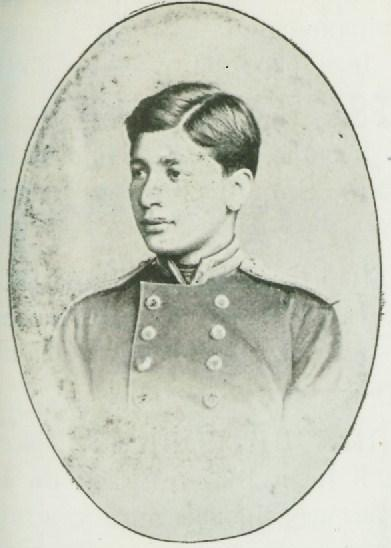

Head of the Republic of Aras
- In office 18 November 1918 – 18 August 1919
- Preceded by: Office established
- Succeeded by: Office abolished

Personal details
- Born: 5 February 1859
- Died: 1929 (aged 69–70)

Jafargulu Khan Nakhchivanski (Azerbaijani: Cəfərqulu xan Naxçıvanski; Russian: Джафаркули-хан Нахичеванский; 5 February 1859 – 1929) was a Russian officer and later an Azerbaijani statesman. He was the brother of General-Adjutant Huseyn Khan Nakhchivanski and father of Major General Jamshid Nakhchivanski.

== Early life and military career ==
Jafargulu Khan was born into a princely family of Nakhchivanski, descending from the rulers of the Nakhchivan Khanate. His father was a Major General of the Russian Imperial army and his mother was the daughter of the khan of Maku. In 1867, young Jafargulu was signed up for the Page Corps. Upon graduating in 1877, he was promoted to cornet in Her Majesty's Uhlan Life Guard Regiment based in Peterhof. In April 1878, he was sent to a regiment stationed in the Caucasus and participated in the Russian occupation of Erzurum during the Russo-Turkish War (1877–1878). In the later years, he participated in Central Asian campaigns of the Russian army, after which he was promoted to Staff captain. For his participation in these military operations, he was awarded the Order of Saint Stanislaus (third degree, 1880), Order of Saint Vladimir (fourth degree, 1881) and Order of Saint Anne (third degree, 1882), as well as medals in commemoration of the Russo-Turkish War of 1877–1878 and for the siege of Geok Tepe.

In 1885 he was elevated to captain of cavalry and retired. In 1903, he was appointed mayor of Nakhchivan. From 1912 to 1917, he was honorary magistrate of Erivan.

== Political activity ==
Following the disintegration of the Russian Empire, Azerbaijan and Armenia, now both independent, quarrelled over the region of Nakhchivan. When in December 1918 it became clear that the British Chief Commissioner Sir John Oliver Wardrop's peace plan would assign Nakhchivan to Armenia instead of Azerbaijan, Nakhchivanski initiated an Azeri revolt, leading to the proclamation of the independence of the Republic of Aras, composed of the former uyezds of Nakhchivan, Sharur-Daralagez and Surmali, with its capital in the city of Nakhchivan. Nakhchivanski became the head of the new republic, which in essence was de facto controlled by Azerbaijan. In May 1919, in the midst of the Armenian–Azerbaijani War, Armenia advanced its troops into it and managed to capture the city of Nakhchivan by June 1919. There it clashed with regular Azerbaijani troops, which reinstalled Azerbaijan's control over the city within a month. On 10 August 1919, the Armenians were forced to sign a peace treaty.

In summer 1920, in the aftermath of the Soviet annexation of Azerbaijan, the Armenians of Nakhchivan revolted. The Soviet Army entered Nakhchivan and quickly suppressed another revolt. Jafargulu Khan Nakhchivanski was arrested by the Bolsheviks allegedly for "spreading anti-Soviet propaganda". He was incarcerated in Baku and claimed innocence in the petitions he sent to the Temporary Revolutionary Committee of Azerbaijan. His appeal was discarded; he was found guilty and transferred to a prison in Shusha, where he died in 1929.
