= His Imperial Majesty's Retinue =

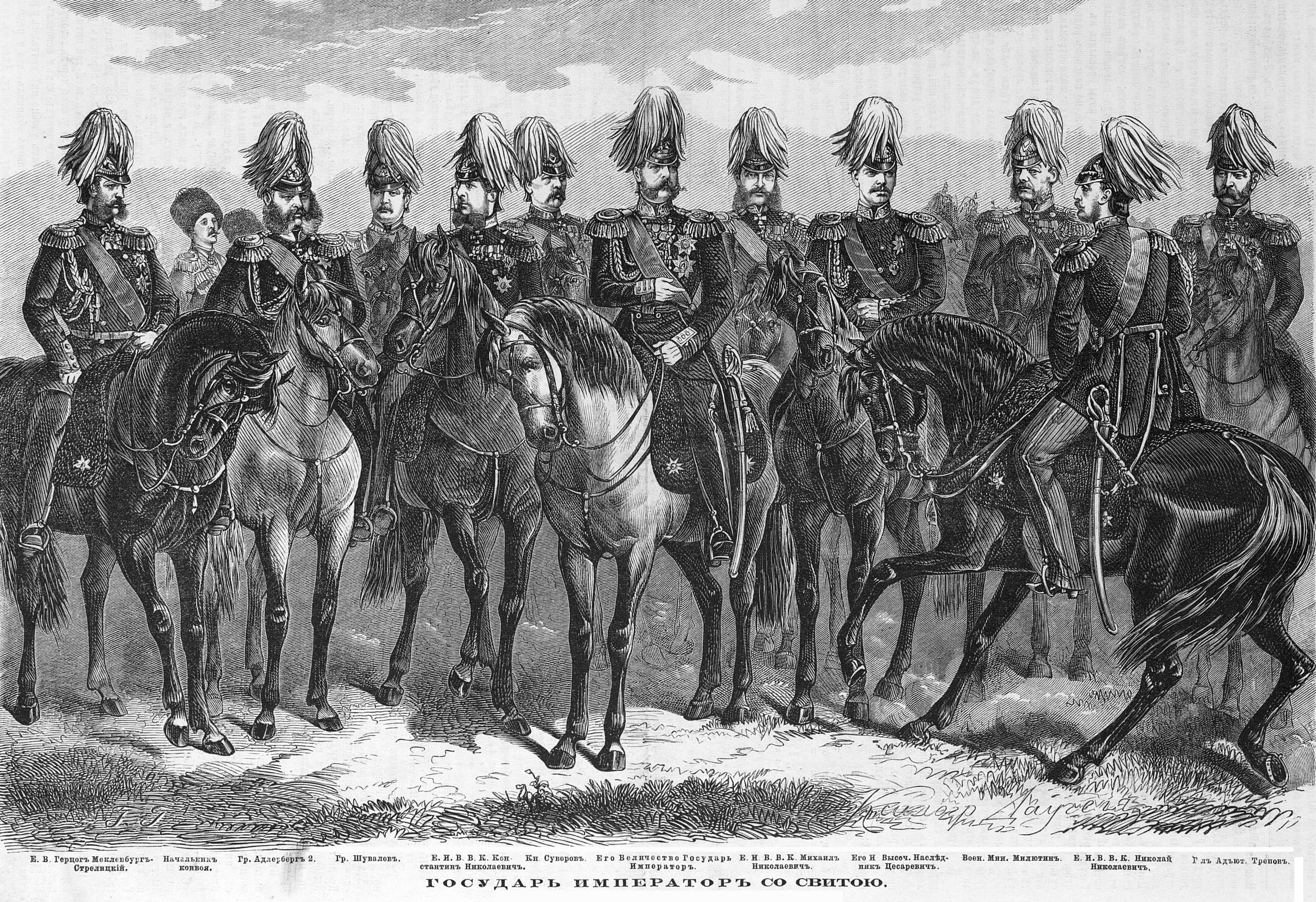
Alexander II of Russia with Suite, 1869

His Imperial Majesty's Retinue, His Imperial Majesty's Suite (abbr. H. I. M. Retinue, H. I. M. Suite; Russian: Свита, romanized: Svíta, e.g. Свита Его Императорского Величества, Е. И. В. Свита) was a retinue unit of personal aides to the Russian Emperor, who usually were officers of the Army or the Guards units.

The aides to the Tsar were routinely assigned honorary title of Adjutant; it was used in parallel with existing personal military, court or civil rank as defined in the Table of Ranks. Anna of Russia was the first Sovereign who assigned an Adjutant General (Генерал-адъютант) as her personal military aide in the rank of General-Poruchik (Генерал-поручик, Lieutenant General). Since 1775, Pavel I additionally honored a handful of his Guards officers (in an equivalent of Colonel ranks) with a Fliegel Adjutant (флигель-адъютант), an equivalent of Aide-de-camp.

Nicholas I formally created the Suite in 1827 and introduced a title of Major General of the H.I.M. Suite. In 1841, a special title of Ajdutant General of the Emperor's Person was created.

However, military units might have been awarded the honourable title «His Imperial Majesty's Suit», e.g. Siberian 1st of «His Imperial Majesty's Suit» infantry regiment — one of the Imperial Russian Army's regiments in East Siberia.

== Sources ==
- "Свита Его Величества" . Brockhaus and Efron Encyclopedic Dictionary (in Russian). 1906.
- "Свита Его Императорского Величества". Большая российская энциклопедия. Том 29: Румыния — Сен-Жан-де-Люз (in Russian). Большая российская энциклопедия. pp. 552–553. ISBN 978-5-85270-366-8. Archived from the original on 9 August 2025.
