= Republic of Aras =

1918–1919 unrecognized state in modern-day Azerbaijan

Republic of Aras Araz Respublikası
- 1918–1919
- Flag
- Capital: Nakhchivan
- Common languages: Azerbaijani
- Demonyms: Araxi, Arak
- Government: Republic
- Head
  - 1918–1919: Jafargulu Khan Nakhchivanski
- History
  - Established: 18 November 1918
  - Disestablished: 18 August 1919

Area
  - Total: 16,000 km^{2} (6,200 sq mi)
Preceded by	Succeeded by
Transcaucasian Democratic Federative Republic	Azerbaijan Democratic Republic

The Republic of Aras (Azerbaijani: Araz Respublikası; also known as the Republic of Araks or the Araxi Republic) was a short-lived and unrecognized state in the South Caucasus, roughly corresponding to the modern Nakhchivan Autonomous Republic of Azerbaijan. Named after the Aras River that formed its southern border, the republic was declared in December 1918 by Jafargulu Khan Nakhchivanski with support from the Azerbaijan Democratic Republic's ruling party, the Musavat Party, and the government of the Ottoman Empire.

The creation of the Republic of Aras was in response to a border proposal by the British, that would have assigned the area to the First Republic of Armenia. Its existence was ended when troops from Armenia advanced into the region and succeeded in taking control over it in mid-June 1919 during the Aras War. However, this triggered an advance into the Nakhchivan region by the army of the Azerbaijan Republic and Ottoman Empire, and by the end of July Armenia had lost control of the region.

== See also ==
- First Armenian Republic
- Azerbaijan Democratic Republic
- Nakhchivan Autonomous Republic
- Armenian-Azerbaijani War
