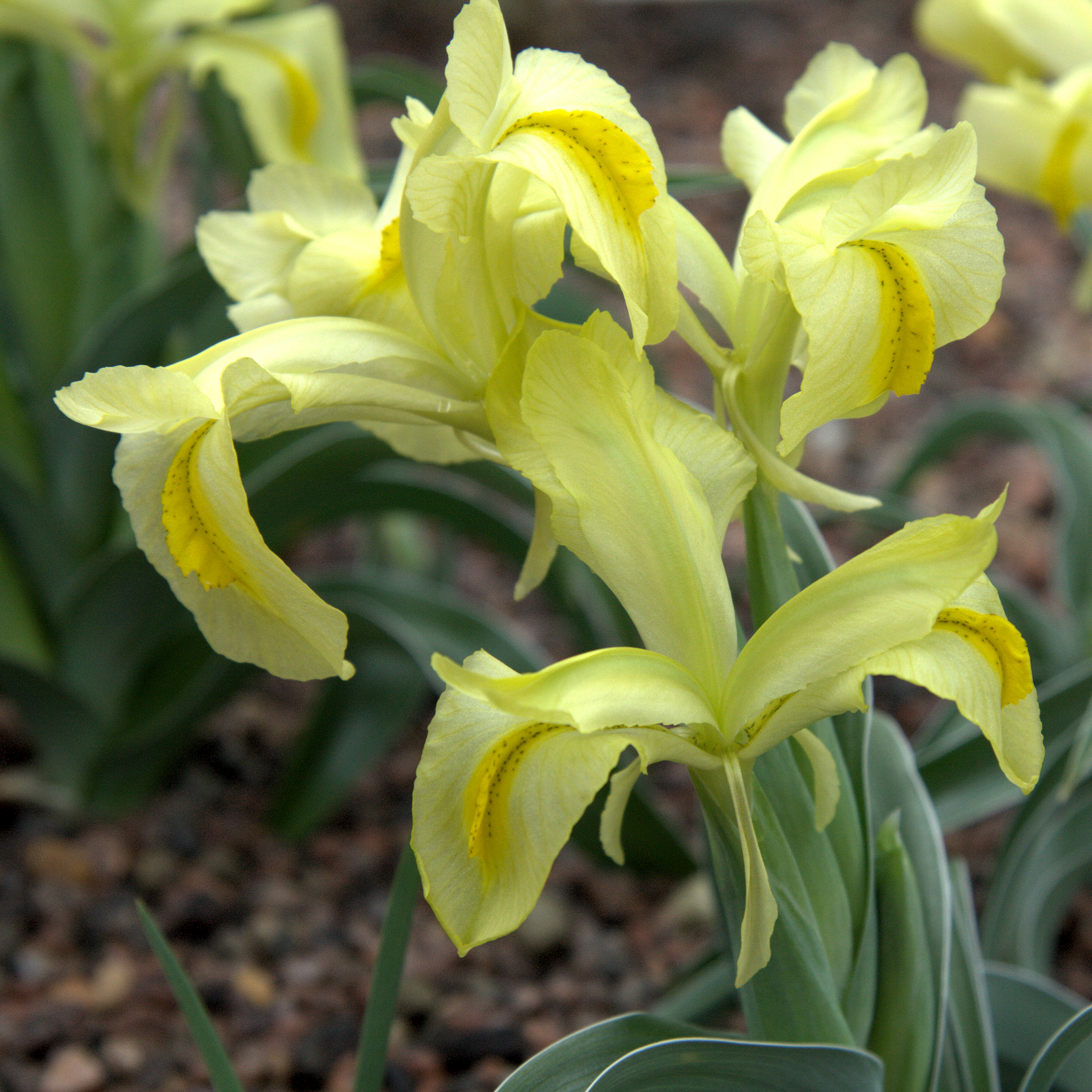

Scientific classification
- Kingdom: Plantae
- Clade: Tracheophytes
- Clade: Angiosperms
- Clade: Monocots
- Order: Asparagales
- Family: Iridaceae
- Genus: Iris
- Subgenus: Iris subg. Scorpiris
- Section: Iris sect. Scorpiris
- Species: I. caucasica

Binomial name
- Iris caucasica Hoff.

Synonyms
- Iris caucasica turcica; Coresantha caucasica (Hoffm.); Costia caucasica (Hoffm.) Willk.; Iris caucasica subsp. caucasica; Juno caucasica (Hoffm.) Tratt.; Neubeckia caucasica (Hoffm.) Alef.; Thelysia caucasica (Hoffm.) Parl.; Xiphion caucasicum (Hoffm.) Baker

= Iris caucasica =

Species of flowering plant

Iris caucasica (also known as Caucasian iris) is a species of plant in the genus Iris, it is also in the subgenus of Scorpiris. Pronounced as 'kaw-KAS-ee-kuh'.

It is a bulbous perennial.

It was described in 1808 by Georg Hoffman in Commentat. Soc. Phys.-Med. Univ. Litt. Caes. Mosq.

It was once confused with Iris orchioides, but Iris caucasica is a smaller plant, with sessile flowers. Also it has leaves that have white margins.

Iris caucasica is an accepted name by the Royal Horticultural Society.

== Habit ==
It has a brown ovoid bulb with fleshy roots. It is similar in form to Iris persica.

It has grey green leaves, which are ciliate and that start growing at flowering time. They reach up to 10–12 cm long and l-2 cm wide. The leaves have a faint white margin.

It has between 1–4 flowers per stem, normally pale yellow or green and with winged falls. The falls also have a yellow ridge. The flowers are 5–15 cm (2–6 in) across. It flowers in late spring. It eventually reaches a height of 15 cm (flower and stem). The flowers are not fragrant.

== Native ==
Iris caucasica grows on limestone mountain slopes (at 1200-3500m above sea level) in Turkey and Armenia and Azerbaijan, in the Caucasus mountains. Bieberstein notes seeing it near Tbilisi in the South Caucasus. It has also been found in Israel and Iran.

== Hybrids ==
In 1892, Michael Foster introduced a hybrid version Iris Caucasica 'Kharput'. which does not have winged falls. It still has 4–5 flowers per stem, which are greenish-yellow. But they are generally larger than parent plant.

== Folk use ==
A survey of plants used as folk medicine showed that Iris caucasica Hoffm. subsp. turcica (or Sarı nevroz, a local name used in Ovacık, Dersim) has been used as for folk medicine in Turkey. The flowers have been used in an infusion to treat colds.

== Sources ==
- Czerepanov, S. K. 1995. Vascular plants of Russia and adjacent states (the former USSR). (L USSR) [noted as 'Juno caucasica' (Hoffm.) Klatt].
- Davis, P. H., ed. 1965–1988. Flora of Turkey and the east Aegean islands. (F Turk)
- Komarov, V. L. et al., eds. 1934–1964. Flora SSSR. (F USSR)
- Mathew, B. 1981. The Iris. (Iris) 146.
- Rechinger, K. H., ed. 1963–. Flora iranica. (F Iran)
- Townsend, C. C. & E. Guest. 1966–. Flora of Iraq. (F Iraq)
