= Iris nusairiensis =

Conservation status
- Critically Endangered (IUCN 3.1)

Scientific classification
- Kingdom: Plantae
- Clade: Embryophytes
- Clade: Tracheophytes
- Clade: Spermatophytes
- Clade: Angiosperms
- Clade: Monocots
- Order: Asparagales
- Family: Iridaceae
- Genus: Iris
- Subgenus: Iris subg. Scorpiris
- Section: Iris sect. Scorpiris
- Species: I. nusairiensis

Binomial name
- Iris nusairiensis Mouterde

Synonyms
- Juno nusairiensis (Mouterde) Soják

Species of flowering plant

Iris nusairiensis is a species in the genus Iris, it is also in the subgenus Scorpiris. It is a bulbous perennial from Syria, it has pale blue or white flowers. It is cultivated as an ornamental plant in temperate regions.

== Description ==
Iris nusairiensis is fairly similar in form to Iris aucheri.

It has a brown bulb with long fleshy storage roots.

It generally has about 6 glossy mid-green, lanceolate leaves rising from the base of the stem.

It grows to a height of 7–10 cm (3–4 in) tall.

It has various shades of blue-white flowers, ranging from pale blue/ light blue to white-blue flowers. The flowers all have a pale yellow or yellow crest on the falls. It also has darker blue veining on the hafts.

== Taxonomy ==
It was published by Paul Mouterde in 'Nouvelle Flora du Liban et de la Syrie' (New flora of Libya and Syria) 311, in 1966.

The Latin specific epithet nusairiensis comes from 'Jebel Nusair' (meaning Nusair's mountain) in Syria, near Mount Cassius, part of the Nusair chain.

It has the common name of 'Syriansk junoiris' in Swedish.

Iris nusairiensis is now an accepted name by the RHS, and it was verified by United States Department of Agriculture and the Agricultural Research Service on 4 April 2003 and updated on 3 December 2004.

== Distribution and habitat ==
It is native to temperate areas of western Asia.

=== Range ===
It is found in Syria.

=== Habitat ===
They are grown on rocky positions.

They can be found at an altitude of 1,400–2,000 metres (4,600–6,600 ft) above sea level.

== Conservation ==
It is listed as one of the significant plants in Syria.

== Cultivation ==
Similar to other Juno irises it prefers well drained soils in full sun. It is better to grow in an alpine house or bulb frame in the UK.

It is not a very widely cultivated by specialist bulb growers, so is difficult to obtain.

Another form of Iris nusairiensis was found in SE Turkey, around the Malatya province, similar in form with three very large creamy-white flowers with a large round rich egg-yolk yellow patch on its falls. But some discussions by botanists think it might be a separate species.

== Other sources ==
- Aldén, B., S. Ryman & M. Hjertson. 2009. Våra kulturväxters namn - ursprung och användning. Formas, Stockholm (Handbook on Swedish cultivated and utility plants, their names and origin).
- Mathew, B. 1981. The Iris. 157.
