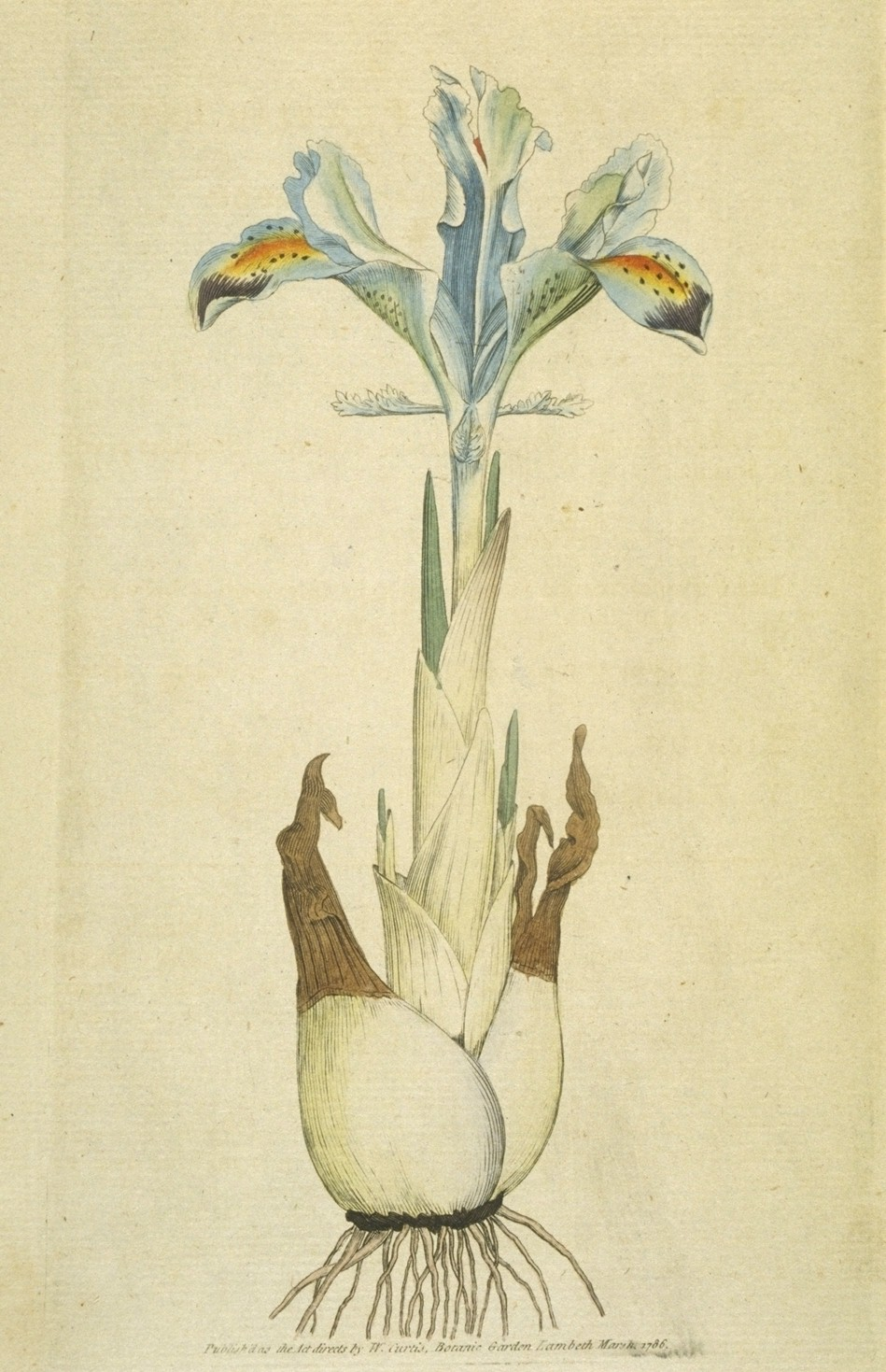
- Iris persica (Juno persica) in The Botanical Magazine

Scientific classification
- Kingdom: Plantae
- Clade: Tracheophytes
- Clade: Angiosperms
- Clade: Monocots
- Order: Asparagales
- Family: Iridaceae
- Genus: Iris
- Subgenus: Iris subg. Scorpiris

Type species
- Iris persica (L.) Tratt.

= Iris subg. Scorpiris =

Subgenus of flowering plants

Iris subg. Scorpiris, commonly called Juno, is a subgenus of Iris, representing the smooth-bulbed bulbous irises. For a while it was an independent genus Juno Tratt. in some classifications.

There are around 60 different species of Juno irises, making it the largest group of bulbous irises. They generally have thick fleshy storage roots (between a few and to several) under a fleshy-like bulb. Most are native to the Middle East and Central Asia (excluding China). There is a single Mediterranean species, Iris planifolia.

All the species are dormant in summer and then grow leaves in mid-winter or early spring.

Many of the bulbs produce scented flowers. Most bulbs are not frost hardy and are best grown in a bulb frame or alpine house.

It consists of a single section, Scorpiris.

== Section Scorpiris ==
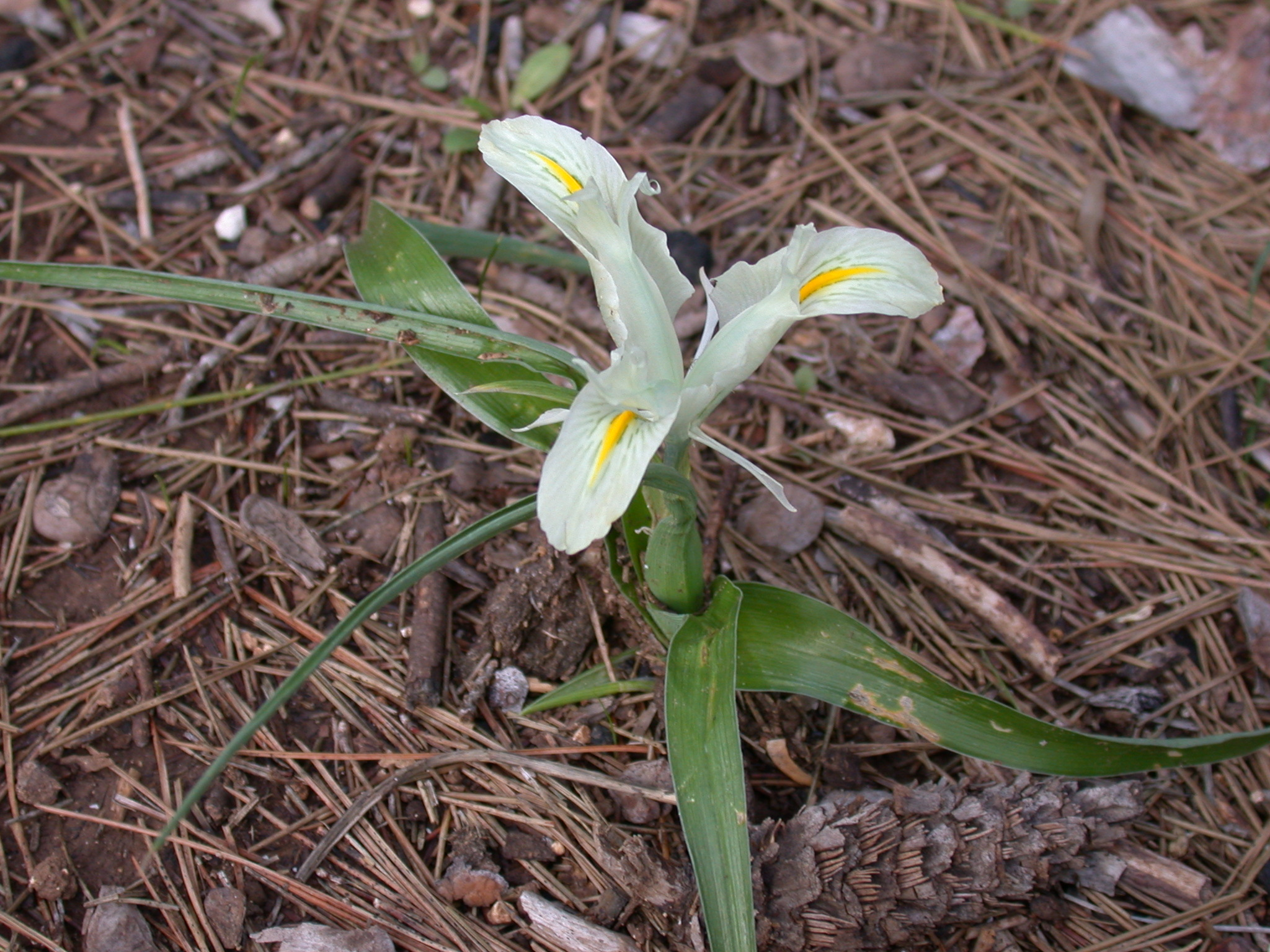
Iris palaestina

- Iris aitchisonii Baker
- Iris albomarginata R.C.Foster
- Iris almaatensis Pavlov
- Iris aucheri (Baker) Sealy (including I. sindjarensis)
- Iris baldshuanica O.Fedtsch.
- Iris boissier Henriques
- Iris bucharica Foster
- Iris cabulica Gilli
- Iris capnoides Vved.
- Iris carterorum Mathew & Wendelbo
- Iris caucasica Hoffm.
- Iris cycloglossa Wendelbo
- Iris doabensis Mathew
- Iris drepanophylla Aitch. & Baker
- Iris edomensis Sealy
- Iris fosteriana Aitch. & Baker
- Iris galatica Siehe
- Iris graeberiana Sealy
- Iris hippolyti Vved.
- Iris hymenospatha Mathew & Wendelbo
- Iris inconspicua Vved.
- Iris khassanovii Tojibaev & Turginov
- Iris kopetdagensis (Vved.) Mathew & Wendelbo
- Iris kuschakewiczii B.Fedtsch
- Iris leptorhiza Vved.
- Iris linifolia Reg.
- Iris magnifica Vved.
- Iris maracandica (Vved.) Wendelbo
- Iris microglossa Wendelbo
- Iris narynensis O.Fedtsch.
- Iris narbutii O.Fedtsch.
- Iris nicolai Vved.
- Iris nusairiensis Monterode
- Iris odontostyla Mathew & Wendelbo
- Iris orchioides Carriere
- Iris palaestina (Bak.) Boiss.
- Iris parvula T.Hall & Seisums
- Iris persica L.
- Iris planifolia (Mill.) Fiori & Paol.
- Iris platyptera Mathew & Wendelbo
- Iris popovii Vved.
- Iris porphyrochrysa Wendelbo
- Iris postii Mouterde
- Iris pseudocaucasica Grossh.
- Iris regis-uzziae Feinbrun
- Iris rosenbachiana Reg.
- Iris schischkinii Grossh.
- Iris stenophylla Hausskn. (ex Baker)
- Iris stocksii (Baker) Boiss
- Iris subdecolorata Vved.
- Iris svetlanae Vved.
- Iris tadshikorum Vved.
- Iris tubergeniana Foster
- Iris vicaria Vved.
- Iris vvedenskyi Nevski
- Iris warleyensis Foster
- Iris wendelboi Grey-Wilson & Mathew
- Iris willmottiana Foster
- Iris xanthochlora Wendelbo
- Iris zaprjagajevii Abramov
- Iris zenaidae Botschant.

== Hybrids ==
Several Scorpiris have been crossed by breeders to produce various hybrids. Including;

- Iris Sindpers (I. aucheri X I. persica)

Between March and April, it has scented, bright sky-blue flowers with ruffled falls, with deeper blue edges. The deep yellow signals are covered with broken, purple lines. The standards are turquoise in colour. The broad style arms are long enough to cover half the falls. It grows to a height of 8 cm (3 in).

- Iris Sindpur (I. aucheri X I. galatica)
- Iris Warlsind (I. warleyensis X I. aucheri)

Iris 'Warlsind' was created by a Dutch nurseryman called Thomas M. Hoog. It has standards that are pearl streaked with milk-blue. It also has bright yellow lozenges tipped with chocolate brown on its falls. It grows to a height of between 24 and 35 cm (10-14"). It is hardy in the US.
