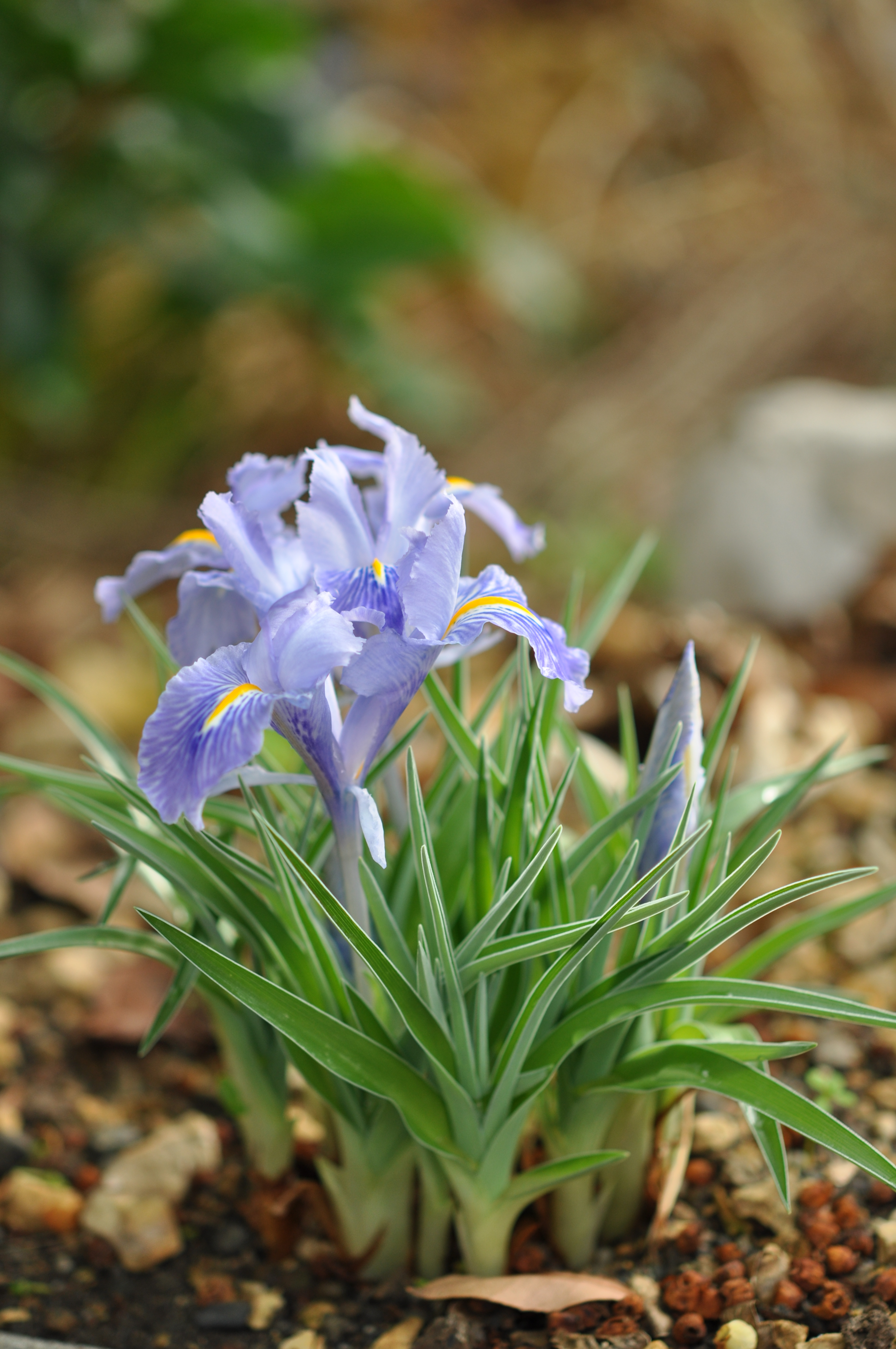

Scientific classification
- Kingdom: Plantae
- Clade: Tracheophytes
- Clade: Angiosperms
- Clade: Monocots
- Order: Asparagales
- Family: Iridaceae
- Genus: Iris
- Subgenus: Iris subg. Scorpiris
- Section: Iris sect. Scorpiris
- Species: I. planifolia

Binomial name
- Iris planifolia T.Durand & Schinz

Synonyms
- Coresantha alata (Poir.) Klatt; Costia scorpioides (Desf.) Willk.; Iris alata Poir.; Iris alata f. parviflora Batt.; Iris alata subsp. trialata (Brot.) Nyman; Iris microptera Vahl; Iris planifolia var. micrantha Batt.; Iris planifolia var. tarhunensis (Borzi & Mattei) Maire & Weiller; Iris scorpioides Desf.; Iris tarhunensis (Borzi & Mattei) Pamp.; Iris transtagana Brot.; Iris trialata Brot.; Juno alata (Poir.) Rodion.; Juno planifolia (Mill.) Asch.; Juno scorpioides (Desf.) Tratt.; Neubeckia scorpioides (Desf.) Alef.; Thelysia alata (Poir.) Parl.; Thelysia grandiflora Salisb.; Thelysia planifolia (Mill.) Mattei; Thelysia tarhunensis Borzi & Mattei; Xiphion alatum (Poir.) Baker; Xiphion planifolium Mill.

= Iris planifolia =

Species of flowering plant

Iris planifolia is a species of flowering plant in the subgenus Scorpiris of the genus Iris, family Iridaceae. This bulbous perennial from Southern Europe and North Africa has long, shiny green leaves, a short stem, and large scented flowers in various shades of blue.

== Description ==
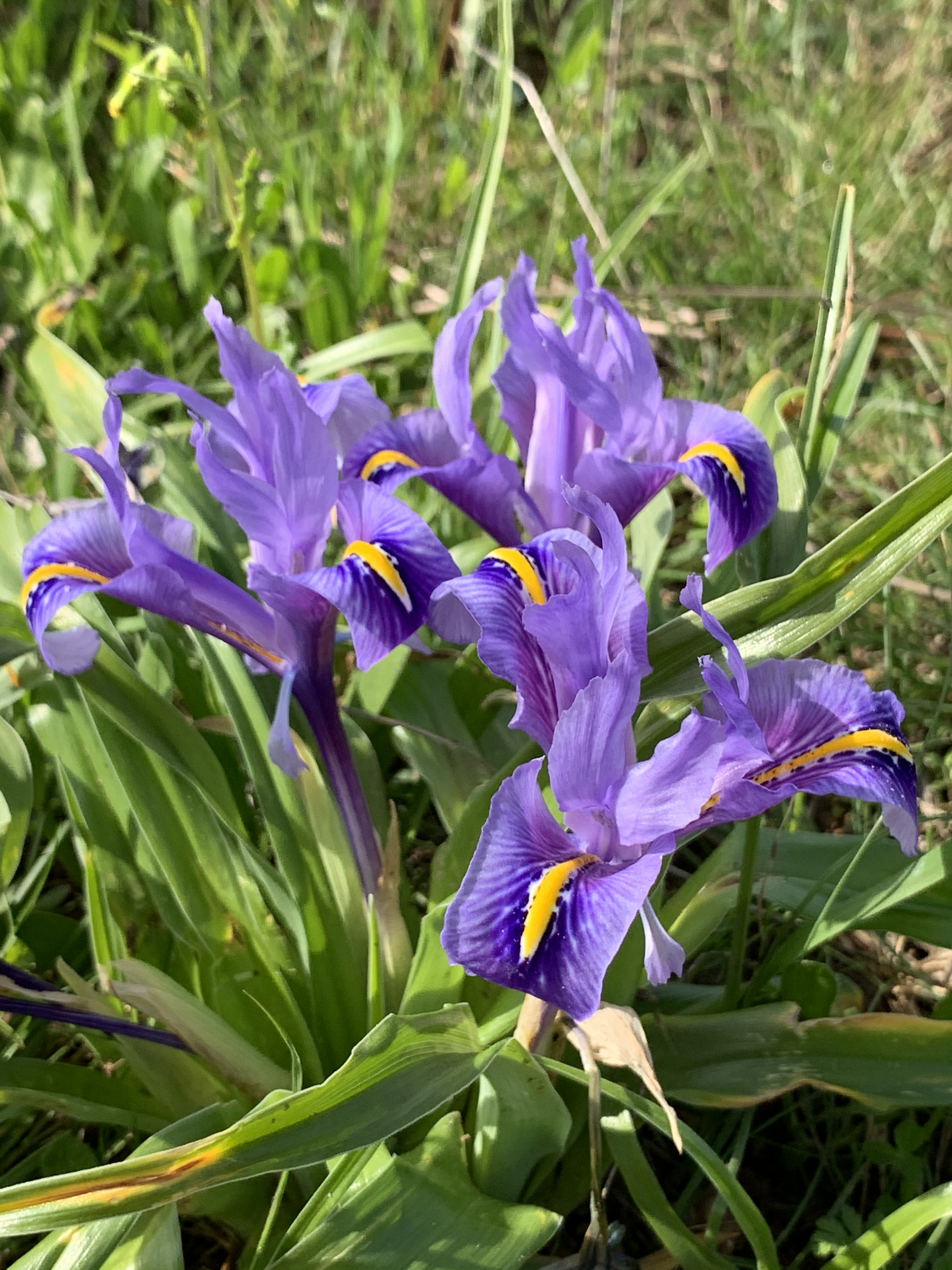
Iris planifolia growing wild near Elvas, Portugal

Iris planifolia has a large brown ovoid bulb (around 2 in (51 mm) in diameter), with fleshy cylindrical white roots.

The shiny green leaves that grow up to 10–30 cm (3.9–11.8 in) long and 1–3 cm wide can conceal the short stem at flowering time. The leaves are lanceolate, beginning narrow at soil level and growing up to a point. It is regarded as having one of the largest flowers in the subgenus Scorpiris.

It can begin to flower in December, in January or February. In the wild it has been known to flower as late as Autumn. The flowers have a light scent, which can be described as spicy.

It is a short, stout plant with up to three large flowers per stem, which are generally 6–7 cm in diameter, with a perianth tube of 8–18 cm long. The falls are 5–8 cm long and the standards are 2 cm long. The plant can reach a maximum height of 10–15 cm (3.9–5.9 in) tall.

The plant has flowers in various shades of blue, from bluish violet, bright sky blue, and lilac blue, Like other irises, it has 2 pairs of petals, 3 large sepals (outer petals), known as the 'falls' and 3 inner, smaller petals (or tepals), known as the 'standards'. The falls have a dark blue veining and a yellow crest on the ridge. It does not have a beard. Occasionally, white flowered forms can be found in the wild.

The plant has tiny football shaped pollen with small spikes.

The capsule is oblong, sessile, like that of Colchicum on the surface of the soil in the centre of the leaves. It has brown seeds which can be as large as a pea.

== Taxonomy ==
The specific epithet of 'planifolia' is derived from the Greek word meaning 'with flat leaves'.

It was first published by T.Durand and Schinz in 'Conspectus Floræ Africæ' No.5. in 1894. But under the name Iris alata.

Fiori and Paoletti in 'Flora Analytica d'Italia', recognized this species as the genus Iris from Millers original entry of Xiphium planifolium. For many years this was known under the synonym. Iris alata by Poir and recorded in a 1939 checklist. Further research took then plant origin back to 1894.

Iris planifolia is now the accepted name by the RHS, and it was verified by United States Department of Agriculture and the Agricultural Research Service on 4 April 2003 and the updated on 3 December 2004. Note; Iris planifolia has over 20 different synonyms. See list in the infobox on the right. Iris alata (also commonly known as 'Scorpion Iris') is the most common synonym.

== Distribution and habitat ==
It is native to the Mediterranean regions of Europe and North Africa. This the only species in the Juno subgenus that can be found growing in Europe.

=== Range ===
It is found in Crete, Greece, Sicily, Spain, Portugal, Sardinia, (within North Africa) in Algeria, Libya, Tunisia, and Morocco.

White forms of the iris can be found in Andalucia.

=== Habitat ===
Iris planifolia is found on rocky hillsides, which are generally wet in the winter and dry in the summer.

== Cultivation ==
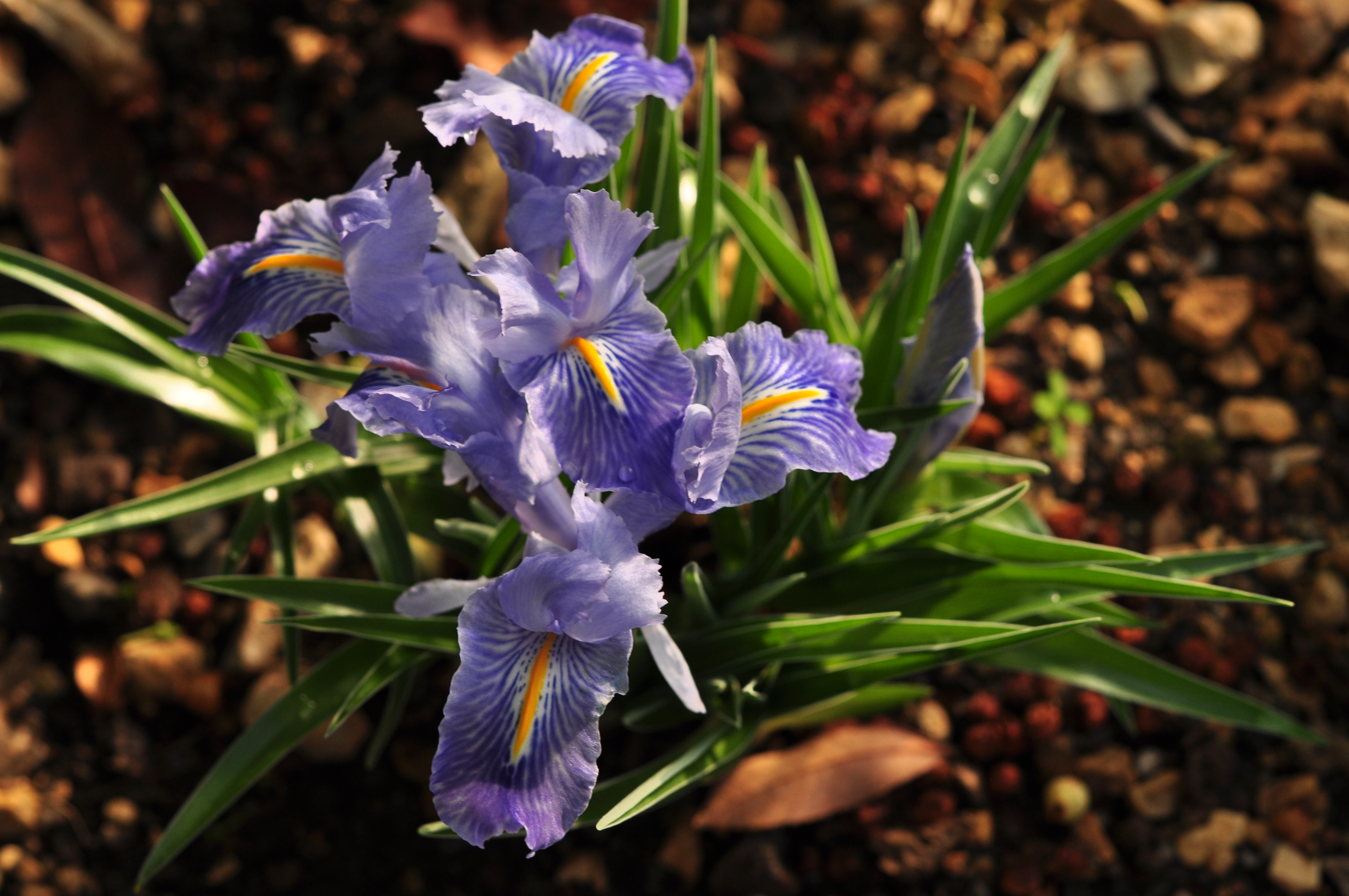
Iris planifolia at Bern Botanic Garden

It is hardy to USDA Zone 3.

The bulb is a short lived plant. It is better grown in the UK, in a bulb frame. In pots or preferably in the ground.

It can also be cultivated in pots. But the pots need to be a minimum of 30 cm tall (or 1 ft), to allow maximum root space.

It needs good ventilation to prevent disease, but can be prone to virus infections. Causing a loss of growth, and causes pale or streaky foliage. Infected plants should be destroyed to stop contamination of other plants.

For good growth next year, it prefers a good warm dry ripening period in summer, in sharply drained soil.

It can be propagated naturally as it creates clumps of bulbs, that can be divided, by being very carefully teased apart in late summer. Care mus be taken not to damage the fleshy roots.
