= Iris zaprjagajevii =

Scientific classification
- Kingdom: Plantae
- Clade: Tracheophytes
- Clade: Angiosperms
- Clade: Monocots
- Order: Asparagales
- Family: Iridaceae
- Genus: Iris
- Subgenus: Iris subg. Scorpiris
- Section: Iris sect. Scorpiris
- Species: I. zaprjagajevii

Binomial name
- Iris zaprjagajevii (N.V.Abramov) T. Hall & Seisums

Synonyms
- Juno zaprjagajevii N.V.Abramov

Species of flowering plant

Iris zaprjagajevii (sometimes misspelled zaprjagajewii,) is a species in the genus Iris, it is also in the subgenus Scorpiris. It is a bulbous perennial from Central Asia. It has greyish-green leaves, short stem and white flowers with a yellow crest.

== Description ==
Iris zaprjagajevii has brownish-grey papery coated bulbs and swollen storage roots.

The leaves are greyish-green with a distinct white margin/edge, and are not fully developed at flowering time. They are clustered around the stem of the plant, partially obscuring the stem. They are falcate shaped and around 4 cm wide.

It grows to a maximum height of 10–15 cm (4–6 in).

It has a short stem that has about 1-3 flowers,

In the UK, it flowers between March and April, depending on the situation. The flowers produce a scent that is similar to primroses.

It has white flowers with a yellow crest. The flowers can have a slight bluish, lilac or pink staining. The flower tube is generally 6–9 cm long. It has falls which are 4 cm long. The claws have down-turned margins and are 2 cm wide.

The seed has an aril (a creamy white collar).

== Taxonomy ==
It was originally published by Ivan Ivanovich Abramov, as Juno zaprjagajevii in 'Novosti Sist. Vyssh. Rast.' 8: 115 in 1971.

It was then published as Iris zaprjagajevii by Tony Hall and Arnis Seisums in the 'Botanical Journal of the Linnean Society' 167: 300 in 2011.

This species was named 'zaprjagajevii' in honour of Mikhail Leonidovich Zapryagaev, at that time acting Director of the Pamir Botanical Garden in Khorog, Tajikistan, who was the first to notice the distinction of this plant.

Iris zaprjagajevii is now an accepted name by the RHS, and it was verified by United States Department of Agriculture and the Agricultural Research Service on 3 October 2014.

== Native ==
Iris zaprjagajevii can be found in the Pamir Mountain range in Central Asia. It was found near Nishup (in the South Western section of the Pamir Mountains) in the former Russian state of Tajikistan

== Cultivation ==
It can be cultivated in an alpine house or outside in well-drained soils similar to other Juno irises.

== Other sources ==
- Czerepanov, S. K. Vascular plants of Russia and adjacent states (the former USSR). 1995 (L USSR)
- Ikinci, N. et al. 2011. Molecular phylogenetics of the juno irises, Iris subgenus Scorpiris (Iridaceae), based on six plastid markers Bot. J. Linn. Soc. 167:281-300.
- Khassanov, F. O. & N. Rakhimova 2012. Taxonomic revision of the genus Iris L. (Iridaceae Juss.) for the flora of Central Asia (Stapfia) 97:178.
- Mathew, B. The Iris. 1981 (Iris) 170-171.
