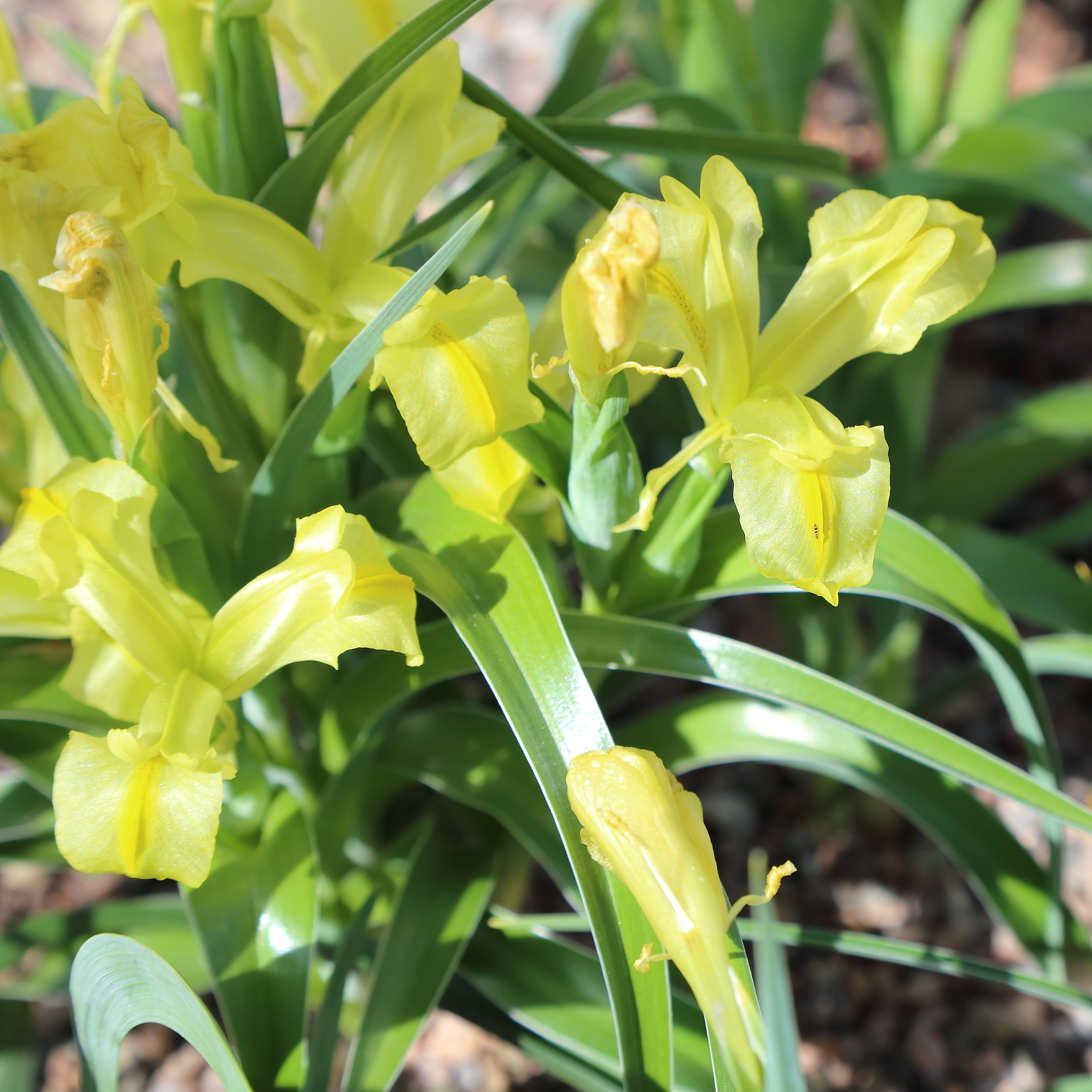

Scientific classification
- Kingdom: Plantae
- Clade: Tracheophytes
- Clade: Angiosperms
- Clade: Monocots
- Order: Asparagales
- Family: Iridaceae
- Genus: Iris
- Subgenus: Iris subg. Scorpiris
- Section: Iris sect. Scorpiris
- Species: I. maracandica

Binomial name
- Iris maracandica Vvedenski (Wendelbo)

Synonyms
- Juno maracandica (Vved).

= Iris maracandica =

Species of flowering plant

Iris maracandica is a species in the genus Iris, it is also in the subgenus Scorpiris. It is a bulbous perennial from Uzbekistan, Central Asia. It has short stems, scented spring flowers in shades of yellow.

== Description ==
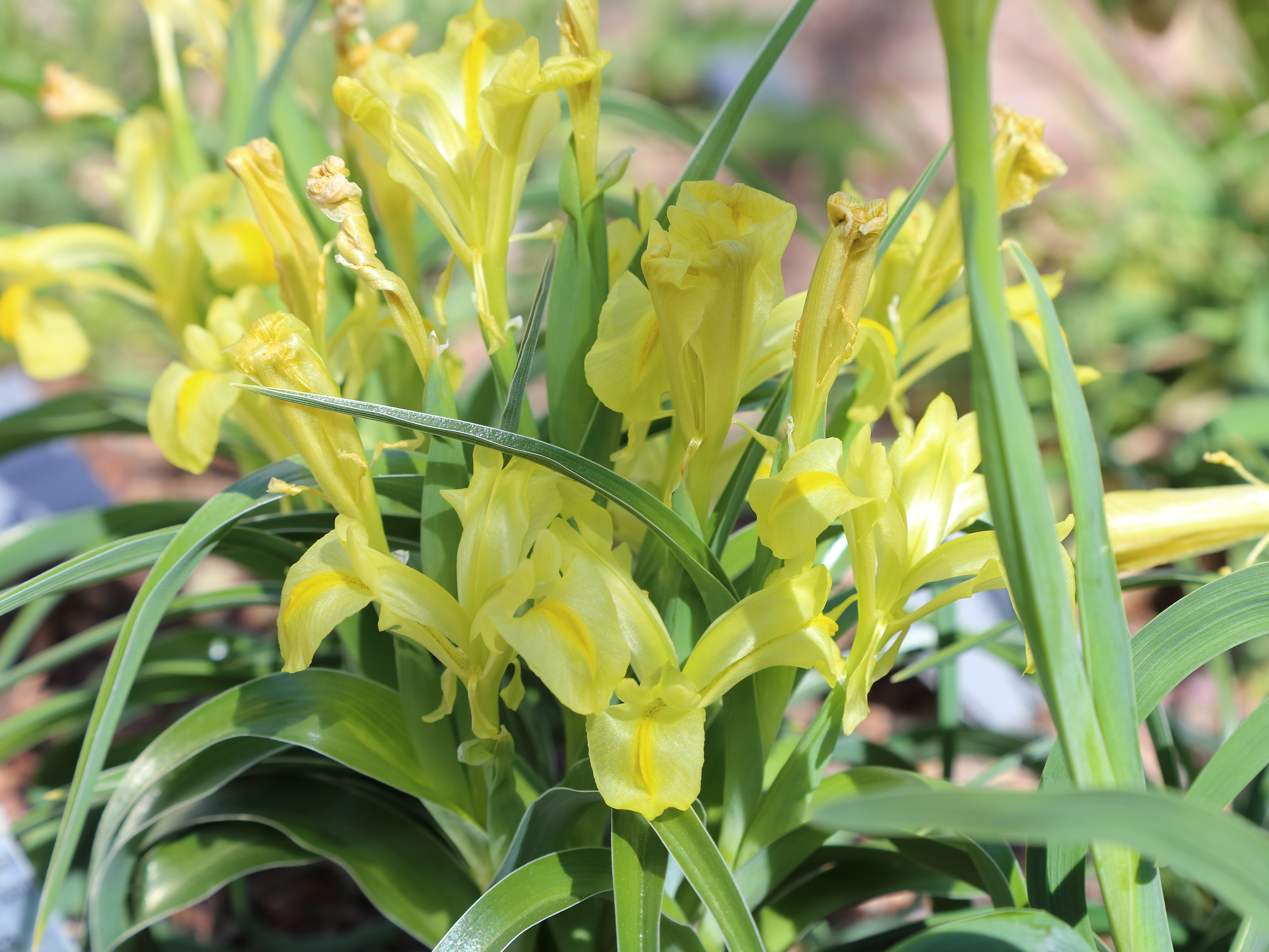
Iris maracandica

Iris maracandica is similar in form to Iris bucharica. It has bulb (approx.) 2 cm in diameter, with thickened fusiform roots (spindle-like).

It has falcate shaped leaves, that are 1.5 – 2 cm wide close to the base of the plant. The leaves have a silver edge. It is small species with the Juno genus, growing up to a height of 15–18 cm (6–7 in) tall.

It has 1-4 strongly scented flowers per stem, which bloom between March and April.

The flowers come in a range of shades of yellow, from pale yellow, to soft yellow, and rich-yellow. The perianth tube generally is about 3 – 4.5 cm long. It has falls that have a wide wing and a raised pale yellow crest, the standards are short and deflexed.

It has whitish anthers and pollen.

== Taxonomy ==
It was originally published as Juno maracandica by Alexei Vvedenski in 'Sched. Herb. Fl. As. Med. ' No. 662 in 1935. It was then published in 'Fl. Tadzhikskoi 'SSR 2: on page 393 in 1963.

It is named after 'Maracanda' (the Greek name for the city of Samarkand), in Tajikistan.

It was then published as Iris maracandica in 'Botaniska Notiser' Vol 128(2) page 216 in 1975 by Wendlbo.

Iris maracandica is now an accepted name by the RHS.

== Native ==
Iris maracandica is found on the gravelly slopes in foothills of Central Asia. Found on the Pamir Mountains, and Nuratau Mountains of Uzbekistan.

It can be found near Dzhizak (now Jizzakh), Samarkand and Akrabat (in Uzbekistan).

== Cultivation ==
It can be cultivated outside in well-drained soils, not needing the protection of a bulb frame or alpine house, in the UK.
