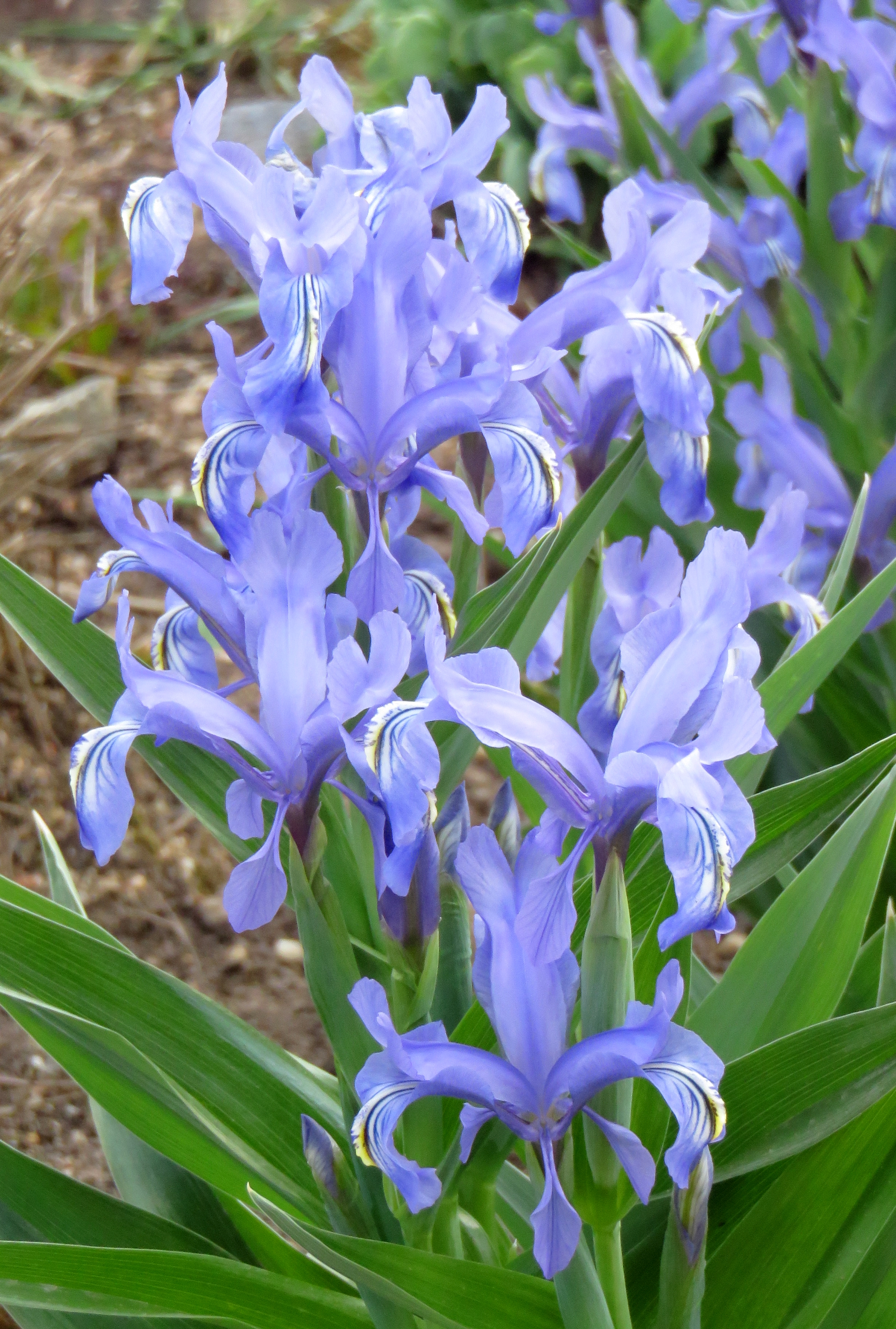

Scientific classification
- Kingdom: Plantae
- Clade: Tracheophytes
- Clade: Angiosperms
- Clade: Monocots
- Order: Asparagales
- Family: Iridaceae
- Genus: Iris
- Subgenus: Iris subg. Scorpiris
- Section: Iris sect. Scorpiris
- Species: I. graeberiana

Binomial name
- Iris graeberiana Sealy

Synonyms
- Juno graeberiana (Sealy) Soják; Juno graeberiana (Sealy) Rodion.

= Iris graeberiana =

Species of flowering plant

Iris graeberiana is a species in the genus Iris, in the subgenus of Scorpiris. It is a bulbous perennial.

== Description ==
In late spring, (or April), it has between 4–6 flowers per stem and reaches a maximum height of 45 cm (18 in) tall.

It has pale silvery mauve flowers. It also comes in blueish-lavender, or blue-violet shades. The flowers are 6–8 cm (2–3 in) wide with a wavy, white crest on each fall. Which is surrounded by a pale, boldly veined zone.

The white margined leaves, have glossy mid-green tops, but with greyish green bottoms, which are scattered along the stem. The leaves grow to approximately 20 cm (8 in) tall at flowering time, then they extend to twice this. They are between 1.5–3.5 cm (1–1 in) wide.

== Taxonomy ==
It was named after Paul Graeber (a plant collector who also collected Iris hoogiana and Tulipa ostrowskiana for the Dutch Van Tubergen company).

It was first published in Botanical Magazine Vol.167 on table 126 by Sealy in 1950.

Iris graeberiana is an accepted name by the RHS, and the iris is recognized by the United States Department of Agriculture and the Agricultural Research Service, since 2003.

== Distribution and habitat ==
It is native to Tajikistan, and Turkestan (parts of the former republic of USSR) in Central Asia.

== Cultivation ==
It is known as one of the more vigorous species, therefore is easier to grow the others in the subgenus. It is also hardy to USDA Zone 5–8.

They are best grown in well-drained soils in open, stony places or an Alpine house, but some growers recommend outside culture, if sheltered from heavy summer rains. The plant attracts birds and butterflies.

It can be seen growing in Le Grand Clos botanical garden in Bourgueil, France.

== Known hybrids ==
- Iris graeberiana 'White fall',

It is thought to have been bred by crossing Iris graeberiana with Iris magnifica.

- Iris graeberiana 'Yellow fall',
- Iris graeberiana 'Dark Form'; a more hardy plant but with smaller darker flowers. It is similar to Iris zenaidae but with smaller flowers.

== Other sources ==
- S. K. Czerepanov, 1995. Vascular plants of Russia and adjacent states (the former USSR) Cambridge University Press. (note: listed as Iris graberana Sealy)
- Walter Erhardt, Erich Götz, Nils Bödeker, Siegmund Seybold: Der große Zander. Eugen Ulmer KG, Stuttgart 2008, ISBN 978-3-8001-5406-7. (Ger.)
- Brian Mathew, 1981. Iris,
- Media related to Iris graeberiana at Wikimedia Commons
- Data related to Iris graeberiana at Wikispecies
