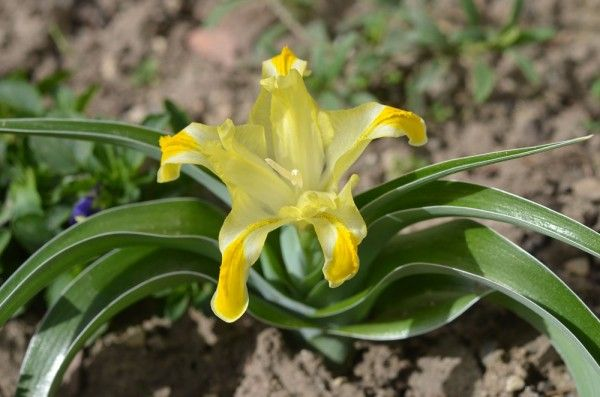

Scientific classification
- Kingdom: Plantae
- Clade: Tracheophytes
- Clade: Angiosperms
- Clade: Monocots
- Order: Asparagales
- Family: Iridaceae
- Genus: Iris
- Subgenus: Iris subg. Scorpiris
- Section: Iris sect. Scorpiris
- Species: I. orchioides

Binomial name
- Iris orchioides Carrière

Synonyms
- Juno orchioides (Carrière) Vved.

= Iris orchioides =

Species of orchid

Iris orchioides, the orchid iris, is a plant species in the genus Iris, and the subgenus Scorpiris. It is a bulbous perennial, from the mountains of Uzbekistan and Kyrgyzstan. It has dark green leaves, slender stems, up to three yellow flowers in spring. It is cultivated as an ornamental plant in temperate regions.

== Description ==
Iris orchioides grows up to 15 to 30 cm (6 to 12 in) tall. Its stem is hidden by channeled leaves until the flowers fade. It has between 5-7, dark green, broad leaves that grow up to 6–8 inches tall.

It has up to 3 yellow flowers on its stem. The flowers vary in shading, from deep yellow to creamy-yellow to a translucent pale yellow, between March and May.

It has a big winged haft (the narrow constricted part of the standards (petals) and falls (sepals) near the center of the iris flower) which are about 2-cm (1") wide. It also has hairs on the ridge of the falls (which are very similar in appearance to a beard (of a bearded iris). It has standards 1/2 an inch wide and linear.

It has cylindrical capsules and seeds without arils. These are similar to Iris bucharica and Iris warleyensis have cubiform seeds,

== Taxonomy ==
In English, Iris orchioides is commonly called the 'orchid iris'. It is called "Ukrop" in its native Kazakh.

It was first published and described by French botanist Élie-Abel Carrière in 'Revue Horticole' (Paris) in 1880). It was listed in 1995 in 'Vascular plants of Russia and adjacent states (the former USSR)' by Czerepanov, S. K.

Iris orchioides is an accepted name by the RHS.

It is often mistakenly, to be a yellow form of Iris bucharica or Iris tienshanica (a synonym of Iris loczyi (Kanitz.)) also from Kazakhstan).

Iris orchioides var. caerulea (Baker) is a synonym of Iris vicaria (Vved.).

It was verified by United States Department of Agriculture and the Agricultural Research Service on 2 October 2014.

It is listed in the Encyclopedia of Life.

== Distribution and habitat ==
It is native to temperate Asia.

=== Range ===
It is found in the mountains of Central Asia. It has been found in Tashkent in Uzbekistan and Kyrgyzstan.

=== Habitat ===
It likes the stoney soils of the foothills.

== Cultivation ==
The species is hardy to USDA Zone 5. It is best grown in an alpine house or bulb frame, and prefers to grow in full sun.

== Known cultivars ==
- Iris orchioides 'Sulphurea'

Found in 1990, has canary-yellow flowers.

- Iris orchioides 'Khirghizian Gold'

== Toxicity ==
Like many other irises, most parts of the plant are poisonous (rhizome and leaves). If ingested, it can cause stomach pains and vomiting. Handling the plant may cause a skin irritation or an allergic reaction.

== Other sources ==
- Czerepanov, S. K. 1995. Vascular plants of Russia and adjacent states (the former USSR). [= Juno orchioides (Carrière) Vved.].
- Khassanov, F. O. & N. Rakhimova. 2012. Taxonomic revision of the genus Iris L. (Iridaceae Juss.) for the flora of Central Asia. Stapfia 97:177.
- Komarov, V. L. et al., eds. 1934–1964. Flora SSSR.
- Mathew, B. 1981. The Iris. 157–158.
