= Iris narynensis =

Scientific classification
- Kingdom: Plantae
- Clade: Tracheophytes
- Clade: Angiosperms
- Clade: Monocots
- Order: Asparagales
- Family: Iridaceae
- Genus: Iris
- Subgenus: Iris subg. Scorpiris
- Section: Iris sect. Scorpiris
- Species: I. narynensis

Binomial name
- Iris narynensis Olga Fedtschenko

Synonyms
- Juno narynensis (O.Fedtsch.) Vved.

Species of flowering plant

Iris narynensis is a plant species in the genus Iris belonging to the subgenus Scorpiris. It is a bulbous perennial.

It was published in Bulletin of the Jardin of St Peterburg's Botanic Garden 159 in 1905.

The name comes from the Naryn River in Kyrgyzstan, where the species was originally discovered.

It is listed in 1995 in Vascular plants of Russia and adjacent states (the former USSR) by Czerepanov, S. K.

Tony Hall published an article about Iris narynensis in Curtis's Botanical Magazine in 2007.

Iris narynensis is an accepted name by the Royal Horticultural Society.

It is hardy to United States Department of Agriculture Zones 4–5.

It has been collected and displayed in the Tashkent Botanical Garden.

== Habit ==
Iris narynensis has 1 or 2 dark-violet(or pale violet). It has dark violet falls. The flowers are up to 7 cm across. It is a very small growing iris, only reaching 5 cm (or 2 in.)

== Native ==
Iris narynensisCorrecting publication info is native to Kyrgyzstan in USSR and Tien Shan Mountains in Central Asia. It has been found in a river canyon at around 600 m above sea level.
