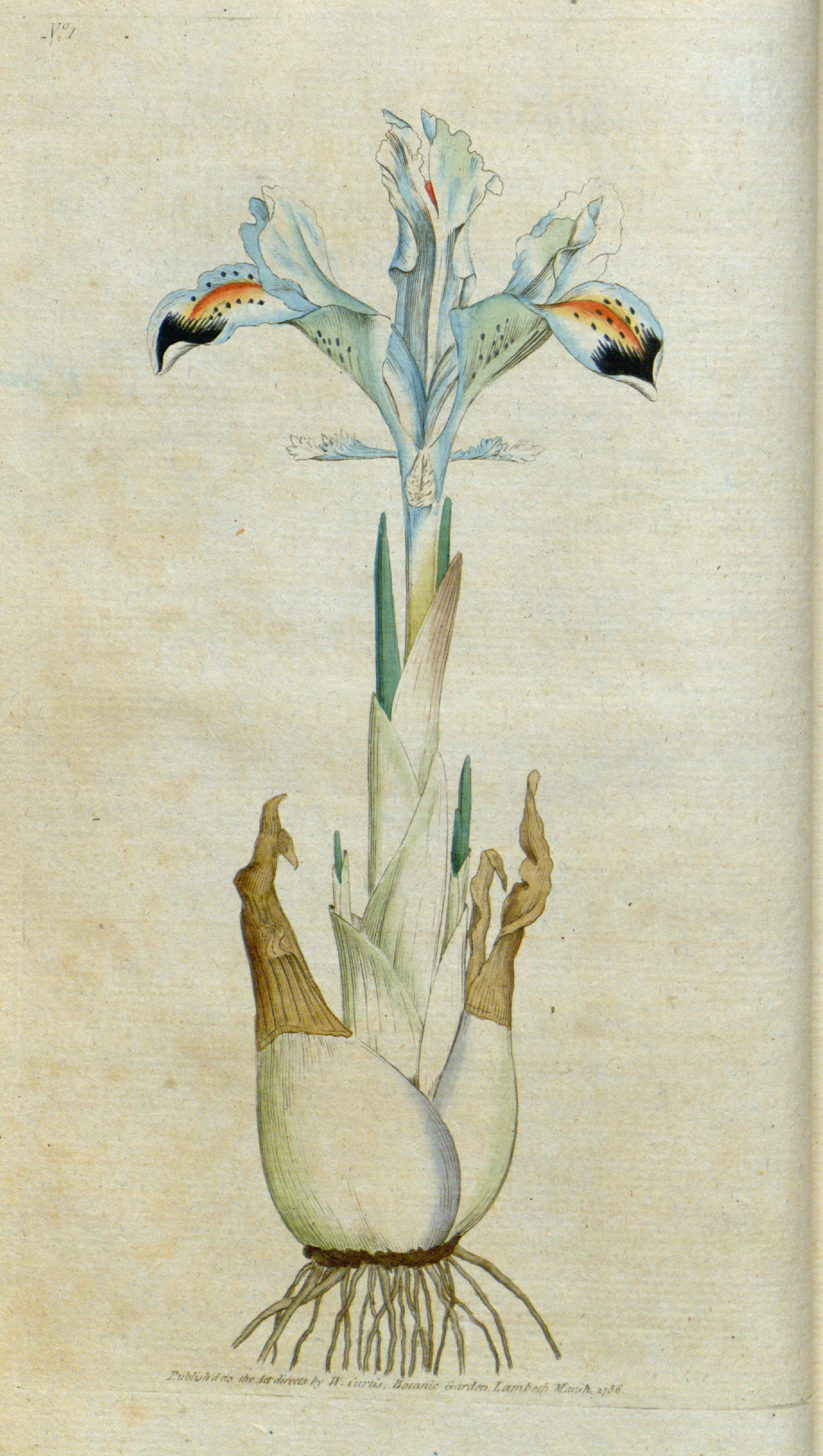
- The Botanical Magazine, Plate 1 (Volume 1, 1787)

Scientific classification
- Kingdom: Plantae
- Clade: Tracheophytes
- Clade: Angiosperms
- Clade: Monocots
- Order: Asparagales
- Family: Iridaceae
- Genus: Iris
- Subgenus: Iris subg. Scorpiris
- Section: Iris sect. Scorpiris
- Species: I. persica

Binomial name
- Iris persica L.

Synonyms
- Coresantha persica Alef; Juno persica Tratt; Iris praecox Salisb.; Costia persica (L.) Willk.; Iris bolleana Siehe; Iris issica Siehe; Iris persica var. bolleana (Siehe) Dykes; Iris persica var. isaacsonii Foster; Iris persica var. issica (Siehe) Dykes; Iris persica var. purpurea (Siehe) Dykes; Iris persica f. sieheana (Lynch) B.Mathew & Wendelbo; Iris persica var. sieheana (Lynch) Dykes; Iris praecox Salisb.; Iris purpurea Siehe; Iris sieheana Lynch; Iris squamata Gaterau; Thelysia persica (L.) Parl.; Xiphion persicum (L.) Mill.

= Iris persica =

Species of flowering plant

Iris persica, the Persian iris, is a native plant of Iran. It is particularly known for its beauty and fragrance.

One of the first Juno irises to be described, this species has been in cultivation for centuries and was listed by Philip Miller in his book of 1732. It was originally grown as an indoor plant.

== Description ==
This bulbous perennial is short, about 4 inches (10 cm) high. The leaves are 0.2 to 0.6 inches (5 to 15 mm) wide with a pale edge and a grey underside. The flowers are 2 inches (5 cm) across, varying in colour from brownish to greenish or greyish.

== Distribution ==
It is an alpine plant growing in the hills of Iraq, Turkey and Syria, at altitudes between 300 and 5400 feet (100 to 1650 metres).

== Cultivation ==
Iris persica needs warmth and shelter to blossom but can be grown in the open air. It flowers in February and March and may flower for up to six weeks in a row.

The beauty of this plant attracted the attention of gardening writers including Vita Sackville-West, Gertrude Jekyll, and William Robinson in his 1893 book The English Flower Garden, among others. Jekyll wrote "How endlessly beautiful are the various kinds of Iris, of which so many bloom in June... in a snug sunny place at the foot of a south wall Iris persica, whose delicate petals of palest greenish-blue are boldly painted with stronger colours..."
