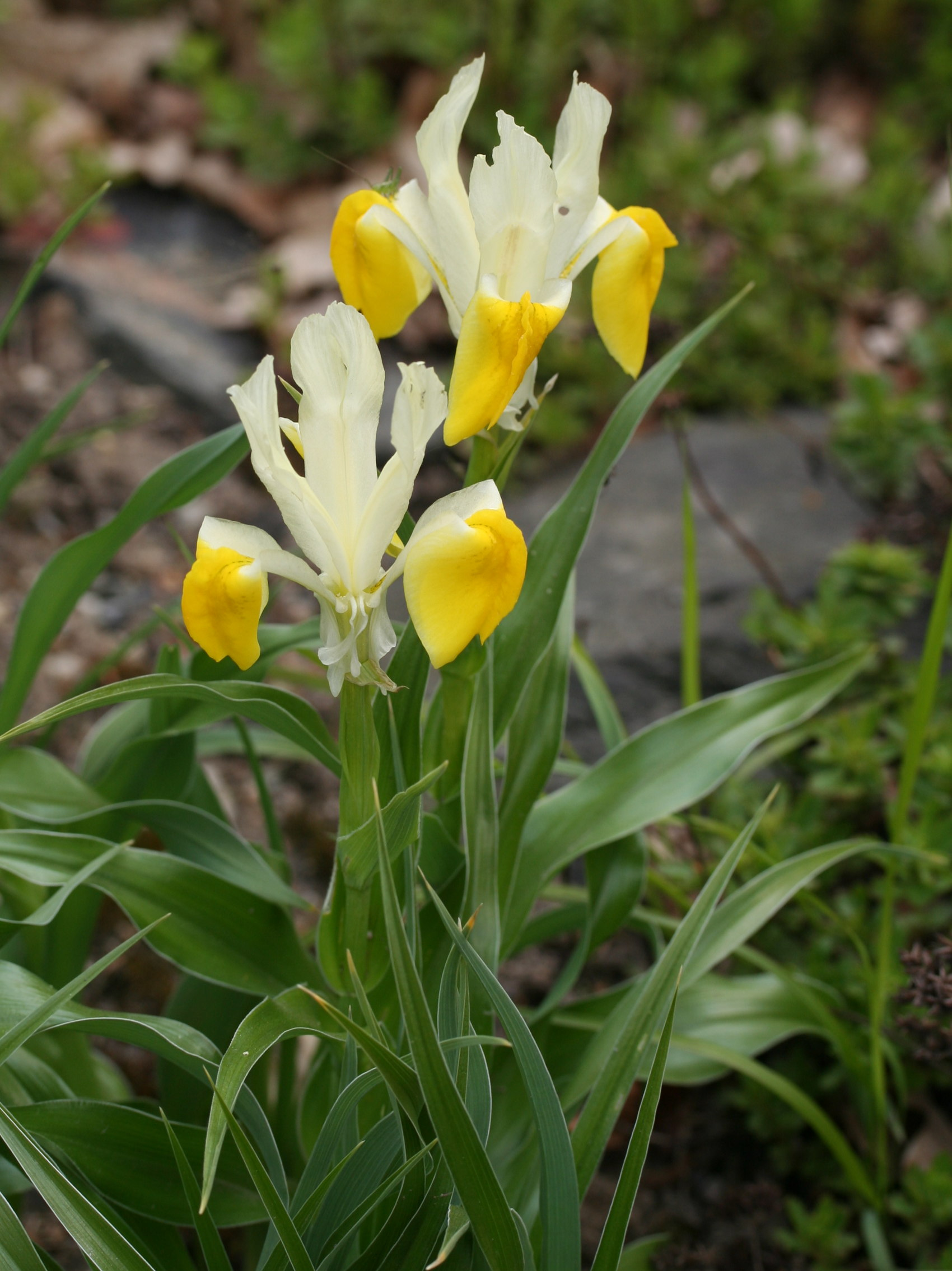
- Iris bucharica, Dresden Botanic Garden

Scientific classification
- Kingdom: Plantae
- Clade: Tracheophytes
- Clade: Angiosperms
- Clade: Monocots
- Order: Asparagales
- Family: Iridaceae
- Genus: Iris
- Subgenus: Iris subg. Scorpiris
- Section: Iris sect. Scorpiris
- Species: I. bucharica

Binomial name
- Iris bucharica Foster

Synonyms
- Juno bucharica (Foster) Vved.

= Iris bucharica =

Species of plant

Iris bucharica (also Bukhara iris, corn leaf iris and horned iris) is a species of flowering plant in the family Iridaceae. It is a bulbous herbaceous perennial, from temperate Asia, within Afghanistan, Tajikistan and Uzbekistan. It has long blue green leaves, many flowers in spring, in shades of yellow and white.

== Description ==
Iris bucharica has a yellowish white bulb, about 2 cm in diameter, with thin fleshy roots. It grows 20–40 cm (7.9–15.7 in) high.

The lanceolate (lance-like) leaves which are blue-green below and glossy green above, reach up to 3.5 cm (1.4 in) wide and 20 cm (7.9 in) long. They are scattered up the flower stems.

Each stem produces up to seven unscented flowers in spring. They bloom in order from the top of the stem, going downwards. The perianth tube is about 4.5–5 cm (1.8–2.0 in) long. Like other irises, it has 2 pairs of petals, 3 large sepals (outer petals), known as the 'falls' and 3 inner, smaller petals (or tepals), known as the 'standards'. The flowers have white or creamy white standards with yellow falls. The falls sometimes have brown markings and a deep yellow crest. The flowers are about 2.5 in (6.4 cm) across. Pure yellow forms are occasionally wrongly labelled as I. orchioides (a different species). The stigmas are semicircular, with whitish anthers and pollen.

Iris bucharica, Iris orchioides and Iris warleyensis all have cubiform seeds.

=== Biochemistry ===
Most irises are diploid, having two sets of chromosomes. This can be used to identify hybrids and classification of groupings.

== Taxonomy ==
It is commonly known as 'Bukhara iris', 'corn leaf Iris', or 'horned iris'.

It is pronounced 'bukh-AR-ee-kuh' and named after the city of Bukhara in Uzbekistan.

Iris bucharica was illustrated in Curtis's Botanical Magazine, Tab. 7111 on 1 April 1890, and was incorrectly described by Baker as a specimen of Iris orchioides. It was then published as Iris bucharica in The Gardeners' Chronicle by Foster in 1902. Michael Foster got the bulbs from the UK bulb merchant Van Tubergen (mainly based in Harlem, Netherlands). It was also published in “Flora and Sylva” in 1905. It was then introduced into the UK in 1902.

It was verified by United States Department of Agriculture and the Agricultural Research Service on 4 April 2003, then updated on 1 December 2004.

== Distribution and habitat ==
Iris bucharica is native to temperate Central Asia. in north-eastern Afghanistan, Tajikistan and Uzbekistan around Bukhara. It is endemic to the Gissar Range, in the valleys of Surkhan-darya, Kafirnigan, Vakhsh, Ak-su and Kizyl-su rivers. It is found at 5,000–6,000 ft (1,500–1,800 m), in pebble beds and gravelly slopes of the lower mountain zone.

== Cultivation ==
Iris bucharica is widely cultivated in temperate regions, and in the UK it has gained the Royal Horticultural Society's Award of Garden Merit.

It prefers free draining fertile soils which are neutral or slightly alkaline. The bulbs are planted in late summer or autumn, 5 cm (2.0 in) deep, in gravelly soils in full sun. Like others of its kind it needs a period of warmth and dryness during the summer, to prevent the fleshy roots from rotting away. This is normally after the foliage dies back in late June or early July.

It is hardy to USDA Zones 4–9. It is hardy in most areas of the UK, down to −15 °C (5 °F). But it can be grown in a pot in a greenhouse, providing it is kept dry in summer and left out in the autumn rains.

It will increase by bulblets, naturalising quickly where growing conditions are favourable, allowing for the creation of drifts in borders or rock gardens. Plants may be lifted and divided every 3–4 years, to prevent overcrowding. It is also possible to grow from seed, but it will take several years before the bulbs are big enough to produce flowers.

Iris orchioides hybridizes freely with I. bucharica to create a large golden-flowered hybrid.

It is deer resistant.

=== Cultivars ===
- Iris 'Sunny Side Up': a hybrid of Iris bucharica and Iris magnifica, this cultivar has yellow and white flowers. It grows up to a height of 50 cm (20 in)
- Iris bucharica 'Princess' (Foster): this cultivar flowers in April and May, the fragrant flowers (similar to freesia), are white with yellow blades on the falls. It reaches a height of 25–35 cm (9.8–13.8 in) (also known as Iris orchioides f. bicolor)
