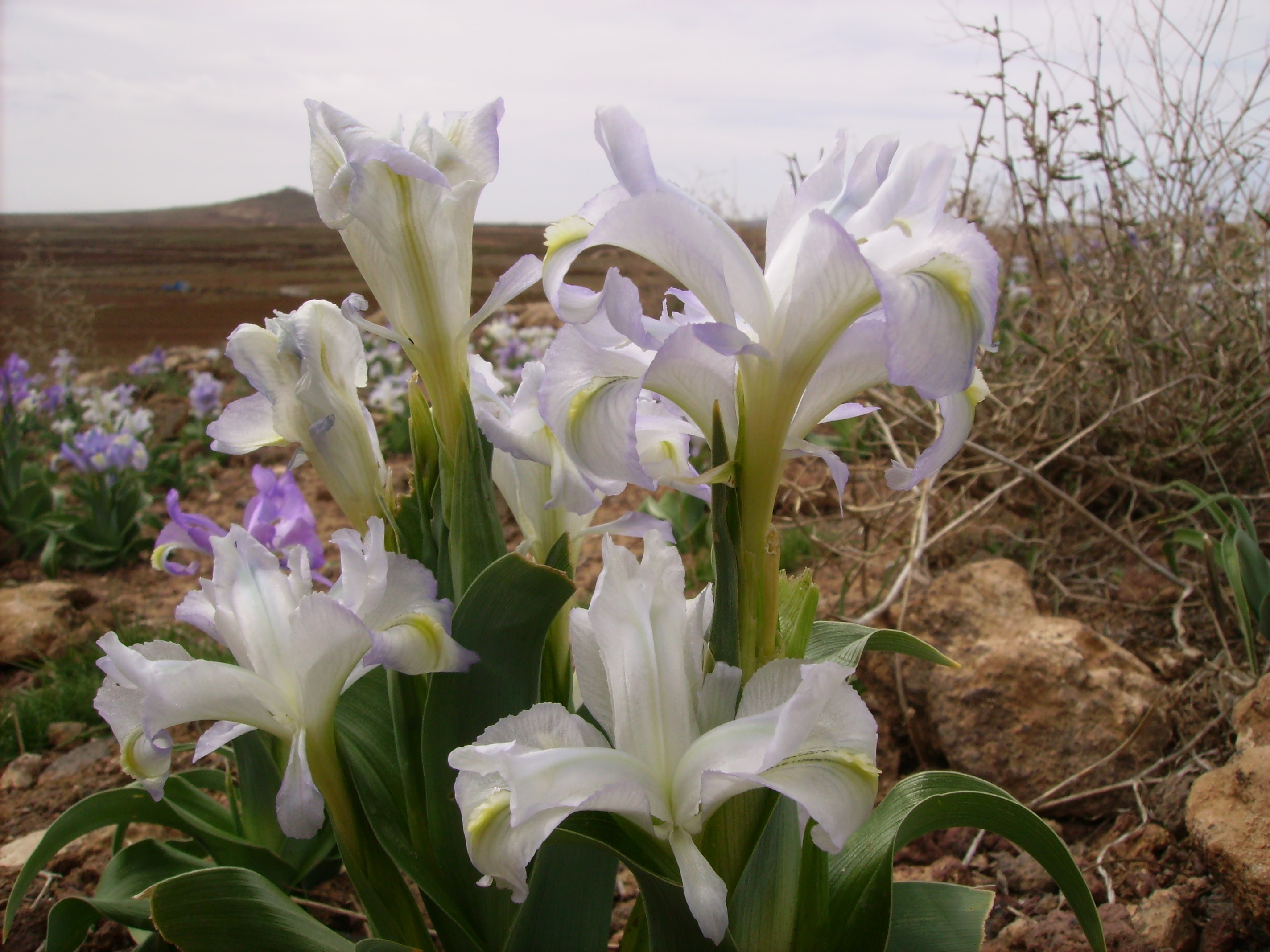

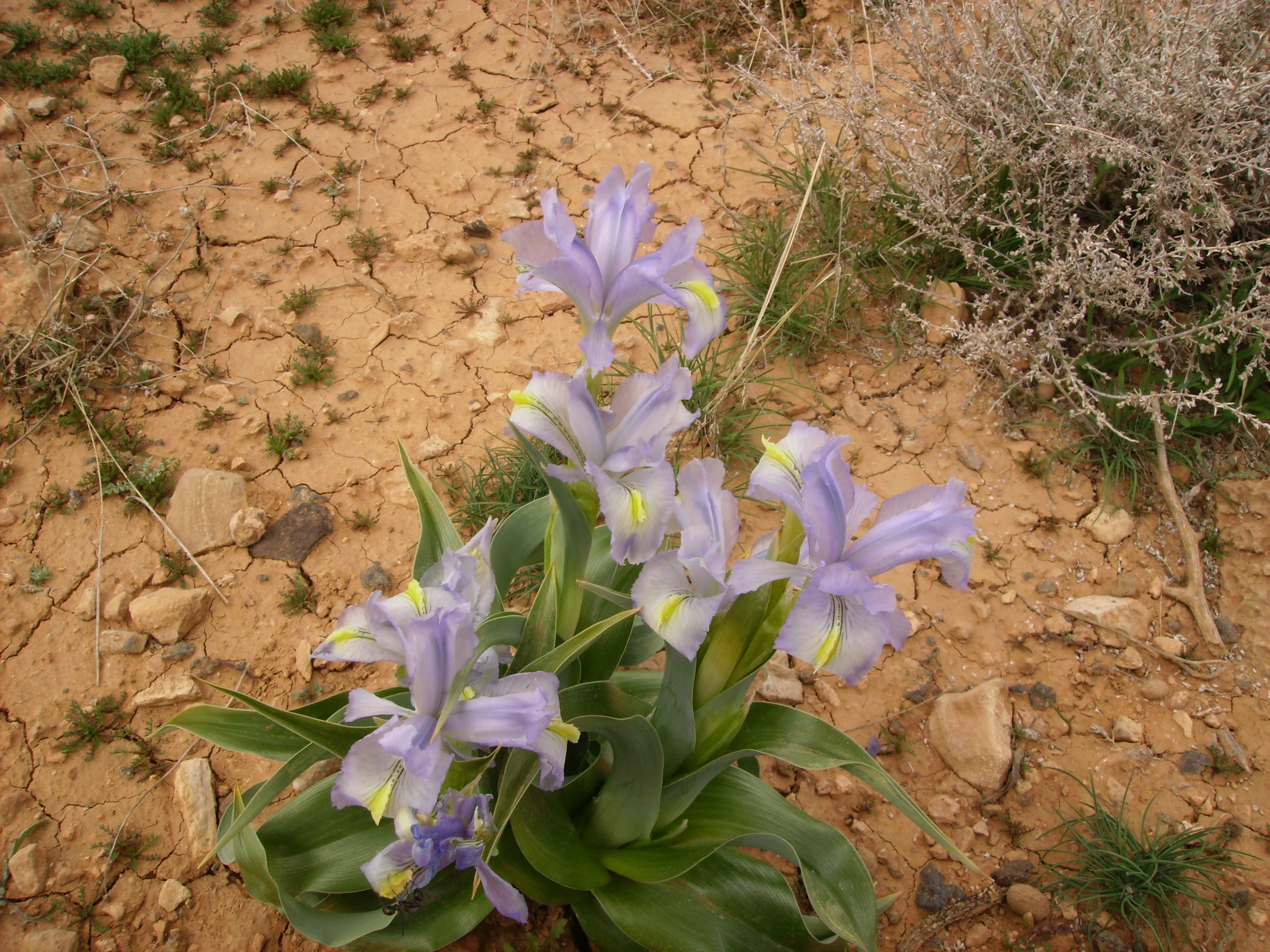

Scientific classification
- Kingdom: Plantae
- Clade: Tracheophytes
- Clade: Angiosperms
- Clade: Monocots
- Order: Asparagales
- Family: Iridaceae
- Genus: Iris
- Subgenus: Iris subg. Scorpiris
- Section: Iris sect. Scorpiris
- Species: I. aucheri

Binomial name
- Iris aucheri (Baker) Sealy

Synonyms
- Iris aucheri var. fumosa Bolt. Iris fumosa Boiss. & Hausskn. Iris nusairiensis Mouterde; Iris sindjarensis Boiss. & Hausskn. Juno aucheri (Baker) Klatt; Juno fumosa Kamelin; Juno nusairiensis (Mouterde) Soják; Juno sindjarensis (Boiss. & Hausskn.) Kamelin; Thelysia fumosa Decne. Xiphion aucheri Baker

= Iris aucheri =

Species of plant

Iris aucheri, the Aucher-Éloy iris, is a species of flowering plant in the family Iridaceae. It is a bulbous perennial in the Juno group of irises (multiple flowers per plant).

== Description ==
Iris aucheri grows to 25 cm (10 in) tall, with crowded lanceolate (lance-shaped) leaves, producing several flowers in late winter or early spring.

The flowers may be white, pale blue or dark blue, with a yellow splash on the falls. It has a violet-like scent.

=== Genetics ===
As most irises are diploid, having two sets of chromosomes, this can be used to identify hybrids and classification of groupings. It has a chromosomal count of 2n = 24. A study in 2014, was carried out on various species of iris DNA, it found that I. iberica subsp. elegantissima had a purity value of 2.80, compared to 1.26 of Iris aucheri.

== Taxonomy ==
The Latin specific epithet aucheri commemorates the 19th century French botanist Pierre Martin Rémi Aucher-Éloy.

It was first described as Xiphion aucheri by Baker and then published as Iris aucheri by Sealy in Kew Bull. page 562 in 1950.

There is a known variant Iris aucheri var. fumosa which was published in 2017.

== Distribution and habitat ==
It is native to temperate Western Asia, in Turkey, Iraq, Iran, Syria and Jordan.

== Cultivation ==
Iris aucheri is cultivated as an ornamental plant in gardens for its showy flowers. It requires neutral or slightly alkaline soil in a sheltered, frost-free spot, or it can be grown in an unheated greenhouse or conservatory, in the UK.

It is hardy down to USDA Zone 6. In the UK, it has been given a hardiness rating by the RHS of H4: −15 °C (5 °F) (hardy in most locations).

This plant species has gained the Royal Horticultural Society's Award of Garden Merit.
