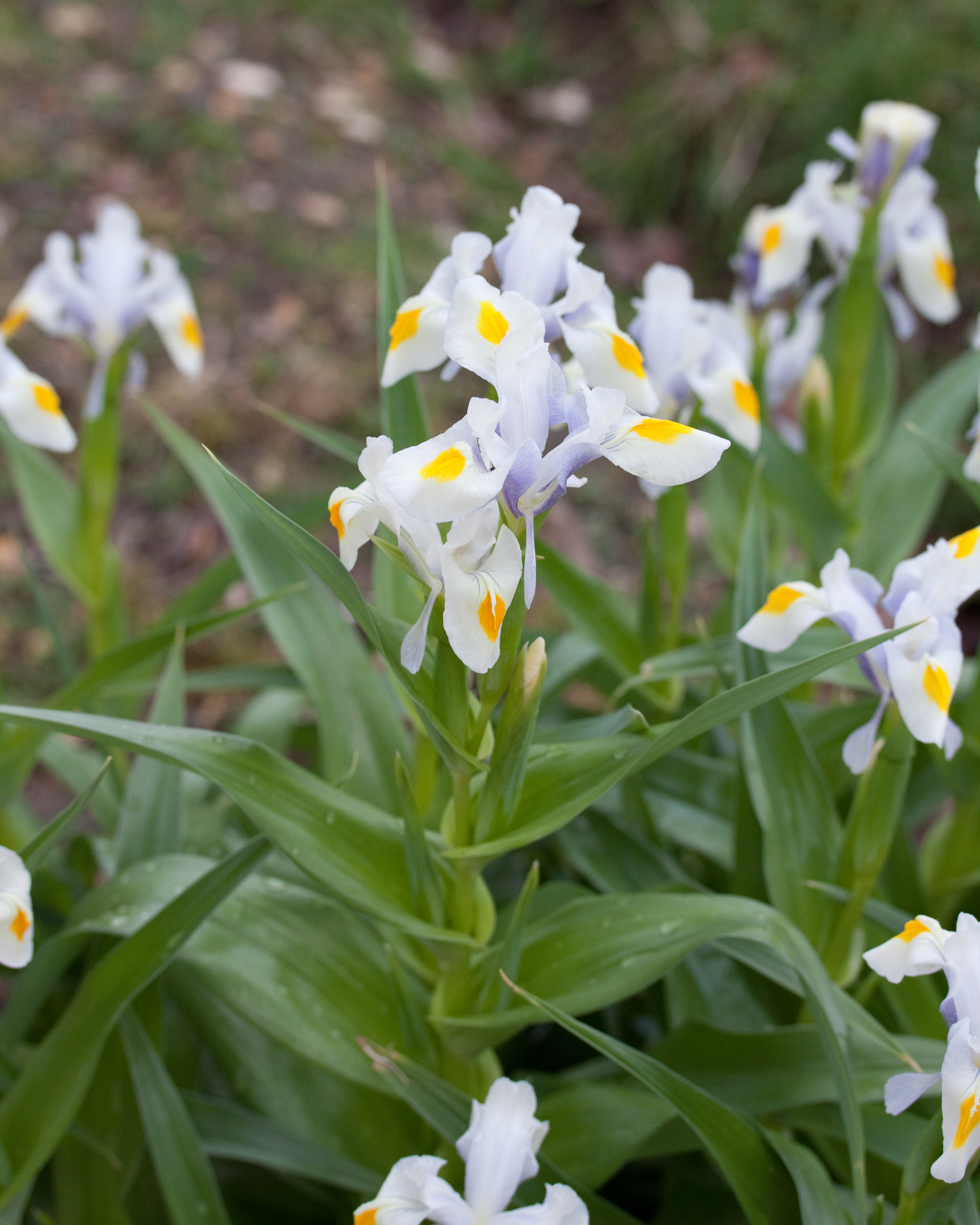

Scientific classification
- Kingdom: Plantae
- Clade: Tracheophytes
- Clade: Angiosperms
- Clade: Monocots
- Order: Asparagales
- Family: Iridaceae
- Genus: Iris
- Subgenus: Iris subg. Scorpiris
- Section: Iris sect. Scorpiris
- Species: I. magnifica

Binomial name
- Iris magnifica Vved.

= Iris magnifica =

Species of flowering plant

Iris magnifica is a bulbous flowering plant in the genus Iris, in the subgenus Scorpiris. It is native to the mountains of Central Asia, including the Zarafshan Range in Uzbekistan. It is cultivated as an ornamental plant in temperate regions – growing to 60 centimetres (24 in) (less in poor soils), and producing pale lilac and white flowers in spring.

This plant has gained the Royal Horticultural Society's Award of Garden Merit.

It has a known hybrid, Iris magnifica 'Agalik' (Vved), which flowers between April and May, in lavender-blue to white shades of colour. It also has an orange-tangerine crest. It will reach a height of 40–60 cm (16–24 in) and is fairly hardy in the US.
