= I. flavescens =

I. flavescens may refer to:

- Iresine flavescens, a tropical plant
- Iris flavescens, a plant with pale yellow flowers
- Isoperla flavescens, a perlodid stonefly
