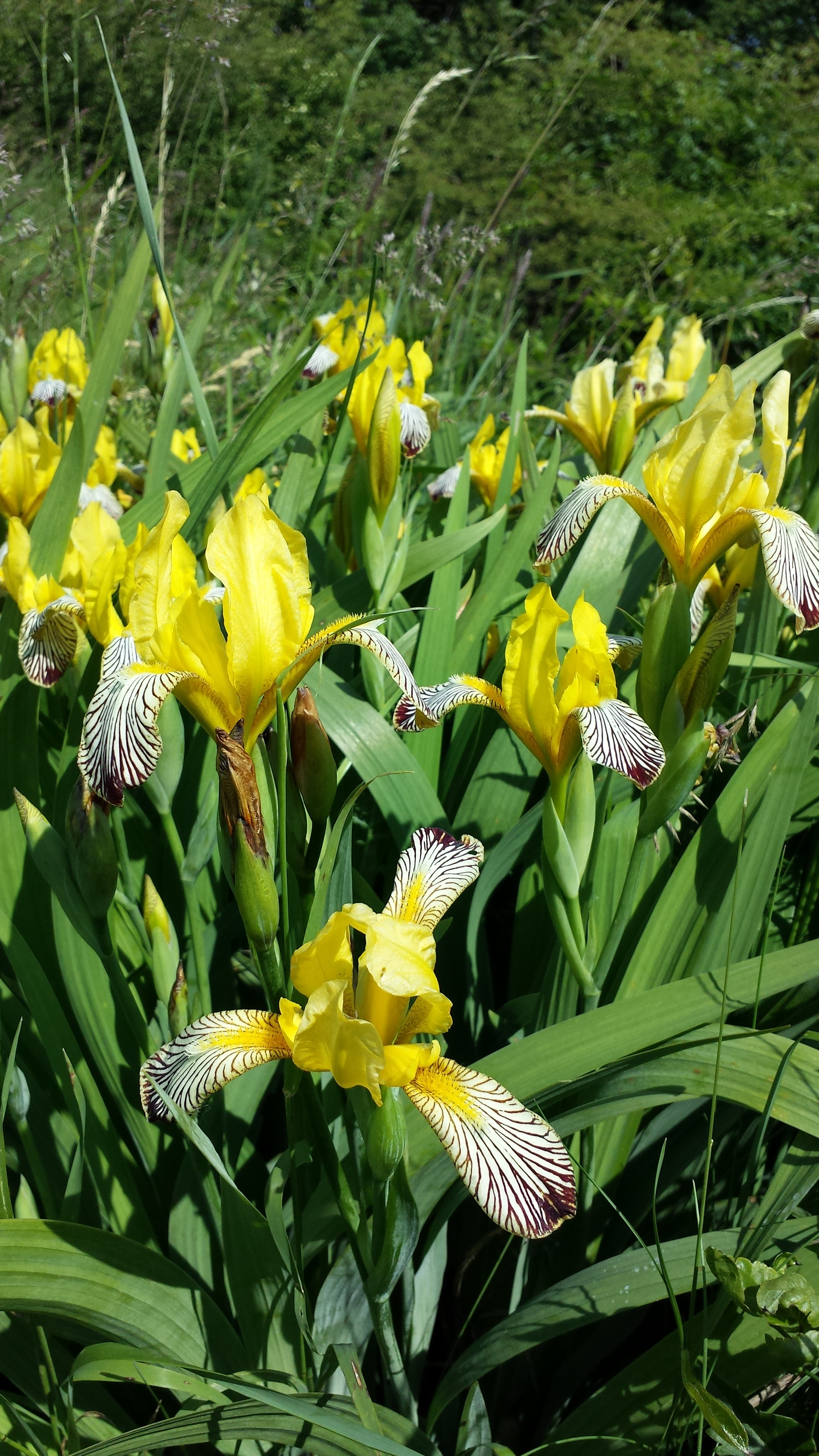

Scientific classification
- Kingdom: Plantae
- Clade: Tracheophytes
- Clade: Angiosperms
- Clade: Monocots
- Order: Asparagales
- Family: Iridaceae
- Genus: Iris
- Subgenus: Iris subg. Iris
- Section: Iris sect. Pogon
- Species: I. flavescens

Binomial name
- Iris flavescens Delile

= Iris flavescens =

Species of flowering plant

Iris flavescens, also known as the lemonyellow iris, is a species of Iris that has distichous leaves and pale yellow flowers. It is similar in appearance to Iris sambucina, although with flowers that are more faded in colour. It can be found in Pennsylvania, United States.
