= Flag (disambiguation) =

A flag is a colored cloth with a specified meaning.

Flag, flags or The Flag may also refer to:

== Arts, entertainment and media ==
=== Fictional entities ===
- Captain Flag, 1940s comic book superhero
- Foundation for Law And Government (FLAG), in TV series Knight Rider and sequels
- Jack Flag, Marvel Comics superhero
- The Flag (Ace Comics), comic book superhero

=== Film and television ===
- Flag (TV series), 2006 Japanese anime
- The Flag: A Story Inspired by the Tradition of Betsy Ross, a 1927 silent short film

=== Music ===
- Flag (note), part of a note symbol in musical notation
- FLAG, a band formed by former members of Black Flag
- Flag (James Taylor album), 1979
- Flag (Yello album), 1988
- Flags (Brooke Fraser album), 2010
- Flags (Moraz and Bruford album), 1985
- The Flag (album), by Rick James, 1986
- "Flag", a song by Sunrise Avenue from the 2017 album Heartbreak Century
- "Flags", a song by Coldplay from the 2019 album Everyday Life
- "Flags", a song by the Cat Empire, a pre-order bonus track from the 2016 album Rising with the Sun

=== Other uses in arts, entertainment and media ===
- Flag (painting), by Jasper Johns, 1954/1955
- The Flag (O'Keeffe painting), by Georgia O'Keeffe, 1918
- The Flag (novel), by Robert Shaw, 1965
- Karogs ('Flag'), Latvian literary magazine 1940–2010

== Businesses and organizations ==
- Fabbrica Ligure Automobili Genova (FLAG), an early Italian automobile manufacturer
- Free Legal Assistance Group (FLAG), an organization of human rights lawyers in the Philippines
- Church of Scientology Flag Service Organization, or Flag

== Places ==
- Flag, Arkansas, US
- Flag, Missouri, US
- Flag River, in Wisconsin, US
- Flag (crater), on the Moon

== Science and technology ==
=== Biology and medicine ===
- Flag iris, the common name of several species
- FLAG (chemotherapy), a chemotherapy regimen
- FLAG-tag, a peptide protein tag

=== Computing ===
- Flag (programming), for signaling special code conditions
- Flag, a command-line option in a command-line interface
- FLAGS register, a CPU register on x86 systems
- Fibre-optic Link Around the Globe (FLAG), an undersea cable

=== Other uses in science and technology ===
- FLAGS (Far North Liquids and Associated Gas System), a natural gas pipeline in the North Sea
- Flag and pennant patterns, in the price charts of financially traded assets
- Flag (geometry), part of a polygon, polyhedron or higher polytope
- Flag (linear algebra), an increasing sequence of subspaces of a vector space

== Sports and games ==
- Flag, a baton used in the sporting event Beach Flags
- Flag, a type of bet offered by UK bookmakers
- Penalty flag, or flag, a yellow cloth used in some field sports to indicate an infraction
- Flag, presented to the winner of the Australian Football League

== Other uses ==
- Flag (lighting), a device used in lighting for motion picture and still photography to block light
- Flagstone or flag, used for paving, fencing, or roofing
- Flag Boshielo (born 1920, disappeared 1970), South African anti-apartheid activist

== See also ==
- Checkered Flag (disambiguation)
- Flagg (disambiguation)
- Flagger (disambiguation)
- Flagging (disambiguation)
- Flagstone (disambiguation)
- Red flag (disambiguation)
- Yellow flag (disambiguation)
- White flag (disambiguation)
- Sweet flag (disambiguation)
- Flag state, the jurisdiction under whose laws a vessel is registered
- Flag tree, a variation of krummholz formation
