= Flagg (surname) =

Flagg is a surname. Notable people with the surname include:

- Abner S. Flagg (1851-1923), American politician
- Ace Flagg (born 2006), American basketball player, twin brother of Cooper
- Amy Flagg (1893-1965), British historian
- Ann Flagg (1924–1970), African-American playwright, actress and teacher
- Azariah C. Flagg, (1790–1873), American politician
- Cooper Flagg (born 2006), American basketball player, twin brother of Ace
- Edmund Flagg (1815–1890), American writer, lawyer, and diplomat
- Ella Flagg Young (1845–1918), American educator
- Ernest Flagg (1857–1947), American architect
- Fannie Flagg (born 1944), American author
- George Whiting Flagg (1816–1897), American painter
- Henry Collins Flagg (1792–1863), American lawyer, newspaper editor, and politician
- James Montgomery Flagg (1877–1960), American artist
- Jared Bradley Flagg (died 1899), American artist
- Norman G. Flagg (1867–1948), American politician
- Ray Dennis Steckler or Cash Flagg (1938–2009), American film director
- Russell de Gree Flagg (1892–1980), American luthier
- Willard Cutting Flagg (1867–1948), American politician
- Wilson Flagg (1938–2001), American admiral

Fictional characters:

- General Flagg, two characters in the G.I. Joe universe
- Harry Flagg, a character in the British soap opera Coronation Street
- Randall Flagg, a villain in several Stephen King novels
- Sam Flagg, a character in the TV series M*A*S*H
- Brick Flagg, a character in the animated series Kim Possible
