= Senator Flagg =

Senator Flagg may refer to:

- Norman G. Flagg (1867–1948), Illinois State Senate
- Willard Cutting Flagg (1829–1878), Illinois State Senate
