= Edgar Anderson =

American botanist

Edgar Shannon Anderson
- Born: November 9, 1897; Forestville, New York
- Died: June 18, 1969 (aged 71)
- Education: Michigan State College, Harvard University
- Awards: Darwin-Wallace Medal
- Scientific career
- Fields: Botany
- Workplaces: Missouri Botanical Garden, Washington University in St. Louis, John Innes Horticultural Institute, Arnold Arboretum
- Doctoral advisor: Edward Murray East
- Author abbrev. (botany): E.S.Anderson

Edgar Shannon Anderson (November 9, 1897 – June 18, 1969) was an American botanist. He introduced the term introgressive hybridization and his 1949 book of that title was an original and important contribution to botanical genetics. His work on the transfer and origin of adaptations through natural hybridization continues to be relevant.

Anderson was elected a Fellow of the American Academy of Arts and Sciences in 1934. In 1954, he was an elected a member of the National Academy of Sciences. He was also president of the Botanical Society of America in 1952, and was a charter member of the Society for the Study of Evolution and the Herb Society of America He received the Darwin-Wallace Medal of the Linnean Society in 1958.

== Early life and education ==
Anderson was born in Forestville, New York. When he was three, his family moved to East Lansing, Michigan where his father had accepted a position to teach dairy husbandry.

In 1914 Anderson entered Michigan State College to study botany and horticulture. After completing his degree in Biology in 1918, he joined the Naval Reserve and in 1919 he accepted a graduate position at the Bussey Institution of Harvard University. His studies were supervised by geneticist Edward Murray East and Anderson worked on the genetics of self-incompatibility in Nicotiana. He was awarded a master's degree in 1920 and a DSc in agricultural genetics in 1922.

== Career ==
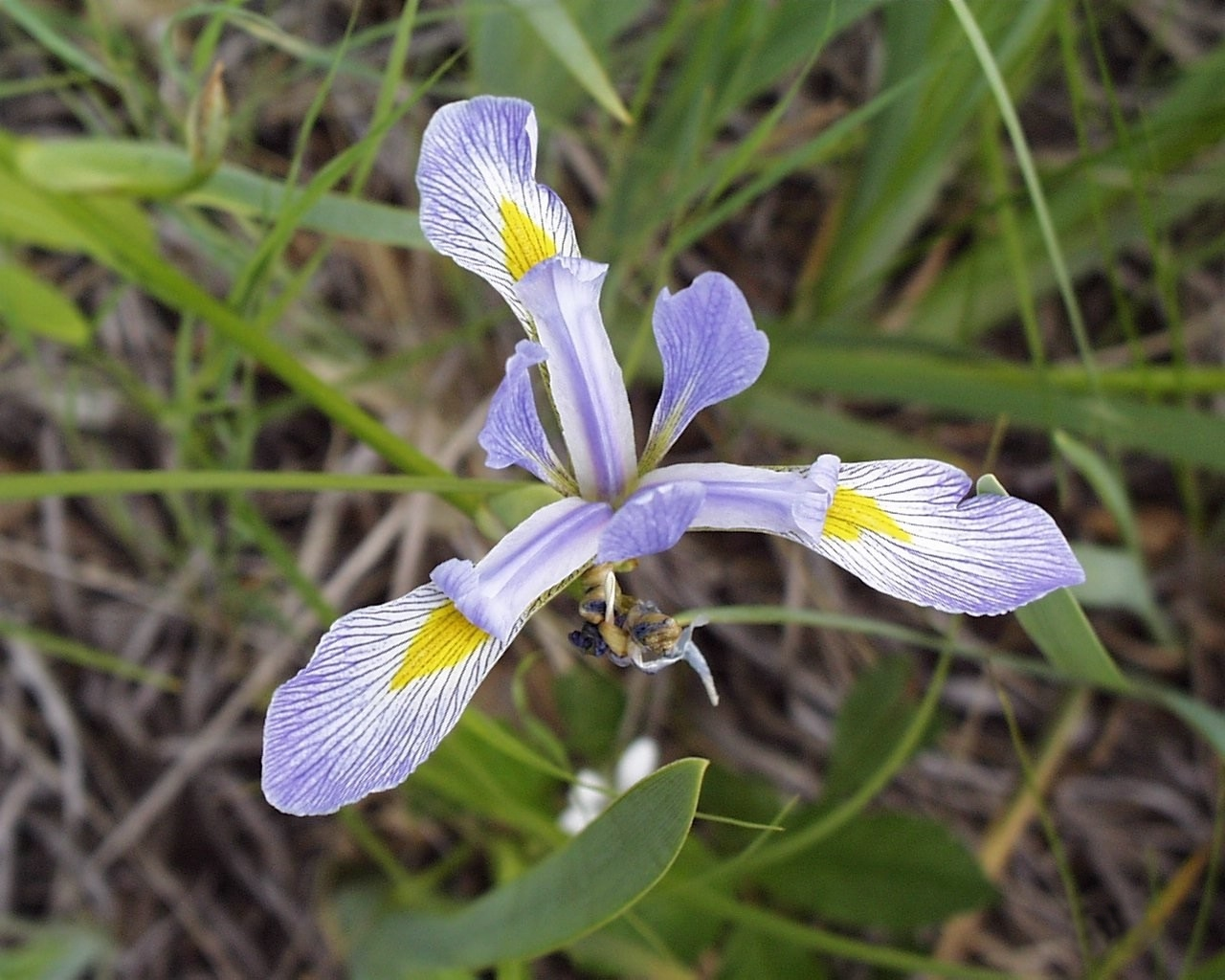
Iris versicolor

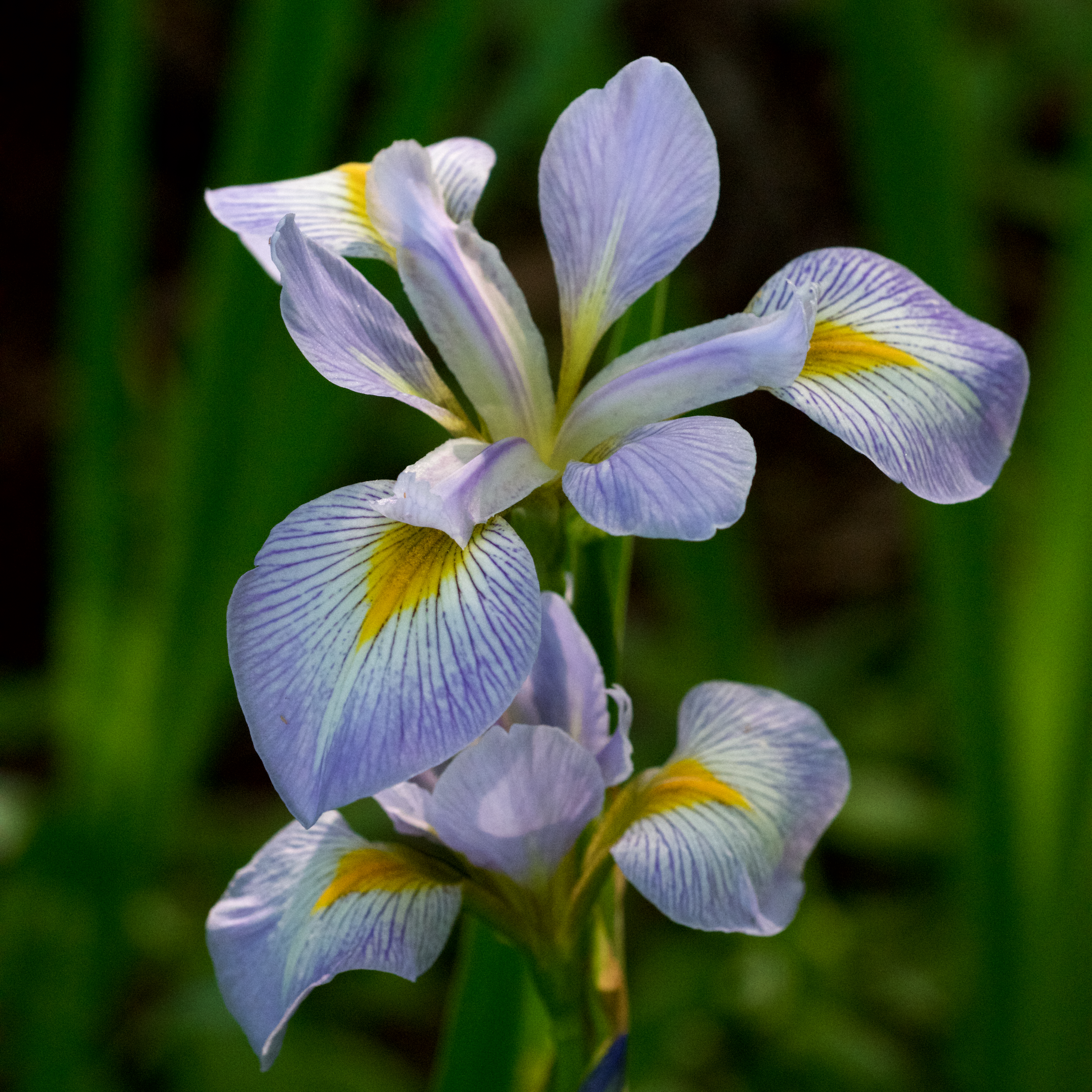
Iris virginica

Anderson accepted a position as a geneticist at the Missouri Botanical Garden in 1922. He was appointed assistant professor of botany at Washington University in St. Louis. His research was focused on developing techniques to quantify geographic variation in Iris versicolor. Anderson determined the existence of a second species, Iris virginica.

In 1929 Anderson received a fellowship to undertake studies at the John Innes Horticultural Institute in Britain, where he worked with cytogeneticist C. D. Darlington, statistician R. A. Fisher, and geneticist J. B. S. Haldane. Anderson's data set on three related species of irises was used by Fisher as an example with which to demonstrate statistical methods of classification and has subsequently become very well known in the machine learning community, though often described as Fisher's iris data.

Scatterplot of the Iris flower data set

Anderson returned to the United States in 1931 and took a position at the Arnold Arboretum at Harvard where he worked with geneticist Karl Sax. In 1935 he returned to the Missouri Botanical Garden and in 1937 received the Engelmann Professorship in botany at Washington University in St. Louis. Between 1934 and 1938 he worked predominantly on Tradescantia. He was the first to introduce the term introgressive hybridization.

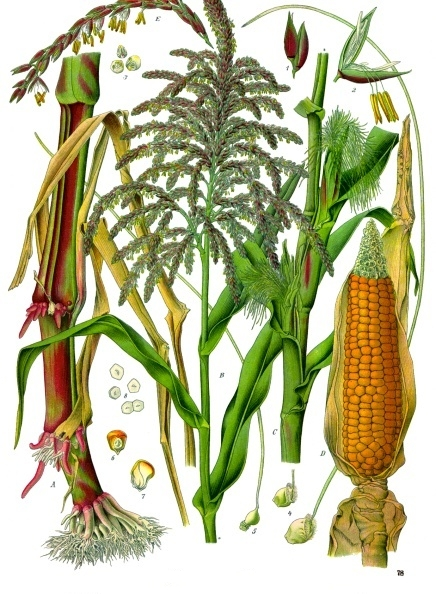
Zea mays

In 1941 Anderson was invited to present the Jesup Lectures at Columbia University with Ernst Mayr, discussing the role of genetics on plant systematics. However, unlike the other presenters of the Jesup Lectures, whose writings would be regarded as the foundation of the modern evolutionary synthesis, Anderson never completed his accompanying manuscript for Systematics and the origin of species. Instead he turned his attention to Zea mays emphasizing the need to study both wild and cultivated plants.

Anderson published Introgressive Hybridization in 1949, describing gene transfer between hybridizing forms, and the role of introgression in speciation. He also wrote the popular science book Plants, Man, and Life (1952), described by one reviewer as "a book every botanist and anthropologist should read". Anderson was briefly director of the Missouri Gardens in 1954, but returned to teaching in 1957. He retired officially in 1967.

Anderson was a close colleague and friend of Esther Lederberg. They frequented the Cold Spring Harbor Laboratory symposia. Anderson was a close friend of many other colleagues, such as J. B. S. Haldane and G. Ledyard Stebbins.
