= Flagg =

Flagg may refer to:

== Places ==
=== United Kingdom ===
- Flagg, Derbyshire, a village in the English Peak District.

=== United States ===
- Flagg, Illinois, an unincorporated community
- Flagg Township, Ogle County, Illinois

== Other uses ==
- Flagg (surname), a list of people and fictional characters
- USS Flagg, a fictional aircraft carrier in the G.I. Joe universe

== See also ==
- American Flagg!, a comic, with Reuben Flagg as the eponymous hero
- Flag (disambiguation)
