= Flag iris =

Flag iris typically refers to several species of iris plant:

- Iris pseudacorus, the yellow flag iris
- Iris versicolor, the larger blue flag iris
- Iris prismatica, the slender blue flag iris

== See also ==
- Libertia pulchella, pretty grass-flag
- Patersonia, a genus of plants whose species are commonly known as native iris or native flag
