= Flagging =

Flagging may refer to:

- Running out of time on a chess clock
- Flagging (tape), a colored non-adhesive tape used in marking objects
- Flagging (shipping) of a merchant vessel under the laws of a flag state
- The activities of a flagger (disambiguation)
- Handkerchief code, a use of color-coded bandannas in the gay and BDSM communities for sex
- Flagging (botany), a growth pattern that reduces or eliminates growth on one side of a tree or other plant
- Flagging (climbing), a rock climbing technique
- Allowing a sail on a sailboat to luff completely, flapping in the wind like a flag

== See also ==
- Flag (disambiguation)
