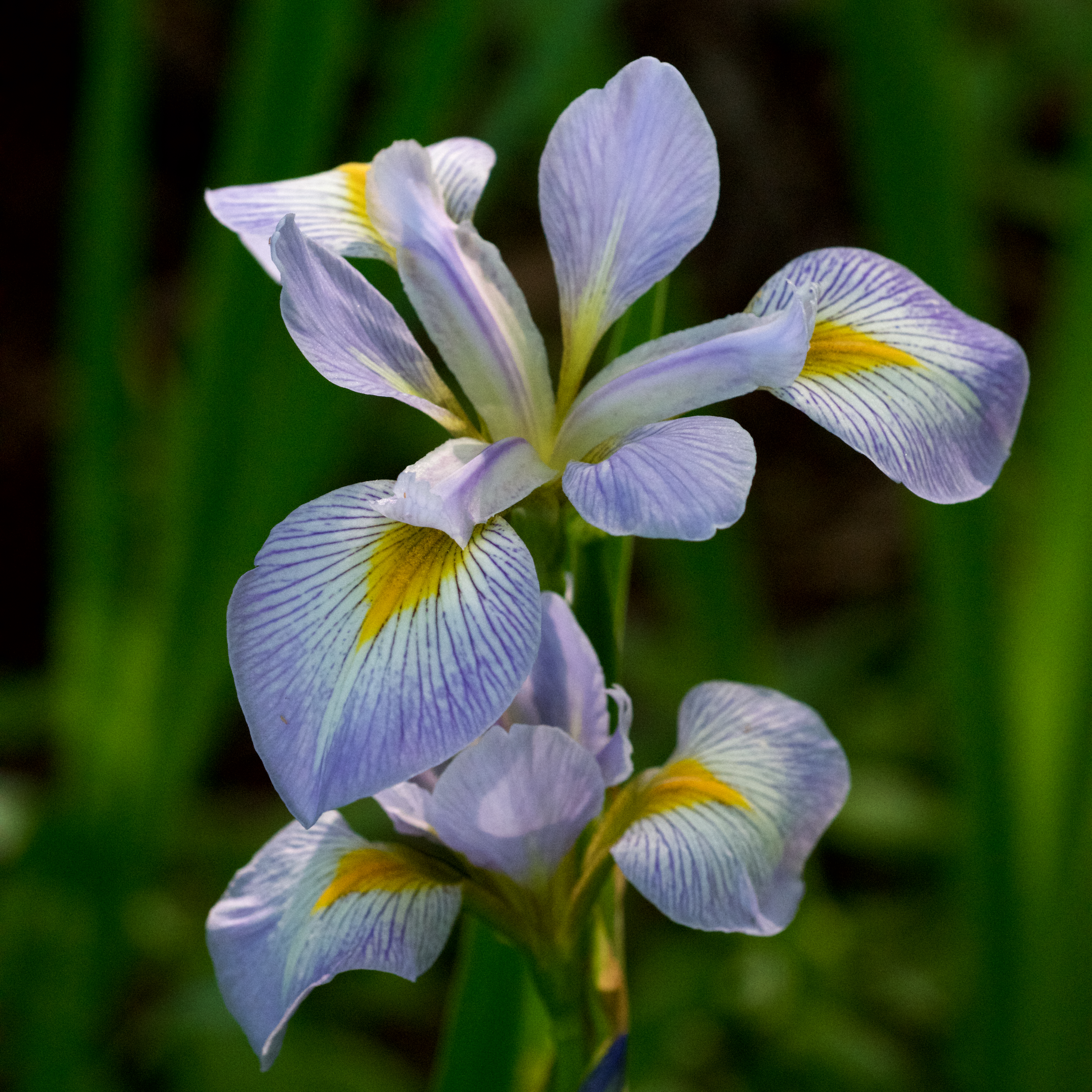

Conservation status
- Least Concern (IUCN 3.1)

- Secure (NatureServe)

Scientific classification
- Kingdom: Plantae
- Clade: Tracheophytes
- Clade: Angiosperms
- Clade: Monocots
- Order: Asparagales
- Family: Iridaceae
- Genus: Iris
- Subgenus: Iris subg. Limniris
- Section: Iris sect. Limniris
- Series: Iris ser. Laevigatae
- Species: I. virginica

Binomial name
- Iris virginica L.

Synonyms
- Iris caroliniana S.Watson; Iris convoluta Raf.; Iris georgiana Britton; Iris shrevei Small; Iris versicolor var. shrevei (Small) B.Boivin; Iris versicolor var. virginica (L.) Baker; Iris versicolor f. virginica (L.) Voss; Iris virginica var. shrevei (Small) E.S.Anderson; Iris virginica var. virginica (none known); Limniris virginica (L.) Rodion.; Xiphion virginicum (L.) Alef.

= Iris virginica =

Species of flowering plant

Iris virginica, with the common name Virginia blueflag, Virginia iris, great blue flag, or southern blue flag, is a perennial species of flowering plant in the Iridaceae (iris) family, native to central and eastern North America.

It was identified as a separate species by Edgar Anderson, and is one of the three Iris species in Anderson's Iris flower data set, used by Ronald Fisher in his 1936 paper "The use of multiple measurements in taxonomic problems" as an example of linear discriminant analysis.

== Description ==
Iris virginica is a perennial plant that grows up to 0.6–0.9 m (2–3 ft) tall. The plant's sword-shaped basal leaves are erect or sometimes arching and measure up to 91 cm (3 ft) long and 2.5 cm (1 in) across at the base. The leaves have smooth margins and are bluish green to green and glabrous. Unbranched or sparingly branched flowering stalks rise from the basal leaves to a height of up to 0.6–0.9 m (2–3 ft). Small, alternate leaves are located on the stalks, with 1 to 2 flowers emerging from the axil of each of these leaves on pedicels that are 3–13 cm (1–5 in) long.

The flowers, which bloom May to July, are blue to blue-violet and are a typical iris shape. Each flower has 3 drooping sepals, called "falls", that have white marks and yellow near the throat, and 3 upright petals, called "standards". Flowers measure 3–13 cm (1–5 in) across.

== Distribution and habitat ==
Iris virginica is native in the United States from Nebraska to the west, Florida and Texas to the south, New York to the east, and the Canadian border to the north. In Canada, it is native in Ontario and Quebec. It grows in wet areas, sometimes in shallow water, including marshes, wet meadows, swamps, river bottoms, sloughs, ditches, bottomland prairies, edges of sinkhole ponds, and in shallow water.

== Uses ==
The Cherokee use this medicinal plant for traditional medicinal uses. The root is pounded into a paste that is used as a salve for the skin. An infusion made from the root is used to treat ailments of the liver, and a decoction of the root is used to treat "yellowish urine".

It may be one of the Iris species used by the Seminole to treat "shock following alligator-bite".

Iris virginica is one of three iris species in Ronald Fisher's Iris flower data set.
