= Iris flower data set =

Statistics dataset

Scatterplot of the data set

The Iris flower data set or Fisher's Iris data set is a multivariate data set used and made famous by the British statistician and biologist Ronald Fisher in his 1936 paper The use of multiple measurements in taxonomic problems as an example of linear discriminant analysis. It is sometimes called Anderson's Iris data set because Edgar Anderson collected the data to quantify the morphologic variation of Iris flowers of three related species. Two of the three species were collected in the Gaspé Peninsula "all from the same pasture, and picked on the same day and measured at the same time by the same person with the same apparatus".

The data set consists of 50 samples from each of three species of Iris (Iris setosa, Iris virginica and Iris versicolor). Four features were measured from each sample: the length and the width of the sepals and petals, in centimeters. Based on the combination of these four features, Fisher developed a linear discriminant model to distinguish each species. Fisher's paper was published in the Annals of Eugenics (today the Annals of Human Genetics).

== Use of the data set ==
Unsatisfactory k-means clustering (the data cannot be clustered into the known classes) and actual species visualized using ELKI

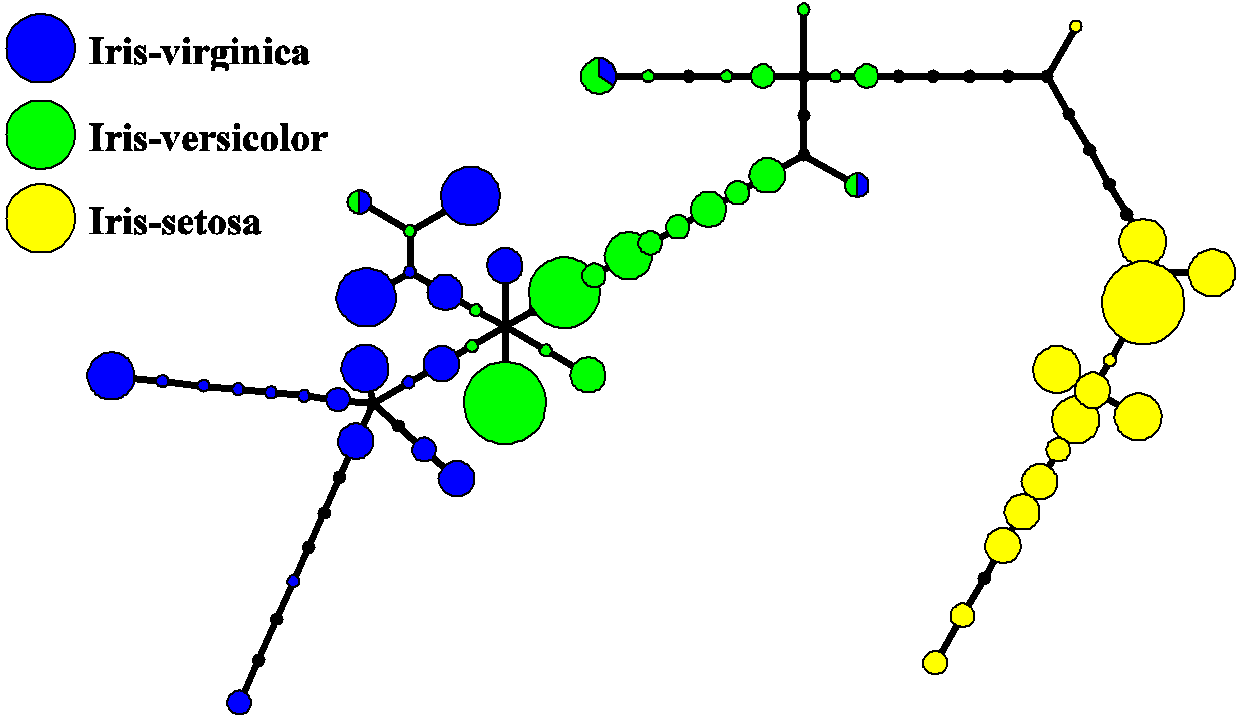
An example of the so-called "metro map" for the Iris data set Only a small fraction of Iris-virginica is mixed with Iris-versicolor. All other samples of the different Iris species belong to the different nodes.

Originally used as an example data set on which Fisher's linear discriminant analysis was applied, it became a typical test case for many statistical classification techniques in machine learning such as support vector machines.

The use of this data set in cluster analysis however is not common, since the data set only contains two clusters with rather obvious separation. One of the clusters contains Iris setosa, while the other cluster contains both Iris virginica and Iris versicolor and is not separable without the species information Fisher used. This makes the data set a good example to explain the difference between supervised and unsupervised techniques in data mining: Fisher's linear discriminant model can only be obtained when the object species are known: class labels and clusters are not necessarily the same.

Nevertheless, all three species of Iris are separable in the projection on the nonlinear and branching principal component. The data set is approximated by the closest tree with some penalty for the excessive number of nodes, bending and stretching. Then the so-called "metro map" is constructed. The data points are projected into the closest node. For each node the pie diagram of the projected points is prepared. The area of the pie is proportional to the number of the projected points. It is clear from the diagram (left) that the absolute majority of the samples of the different Iris species belong to the different nodes. Only a small fraction of Iris-virginica is mixed with Iris-versicolor (the mixed blue-green nodes in the diagram). Therefore, the three species of Iris (Iris setosa, Iris virginica and Iris versicolor) are separable by the unsupervising procedures of nonlinear principal component analysis. To discriminate them, it is sufficient just to select the corresponding nodes on the principal tree.

== Data set ==
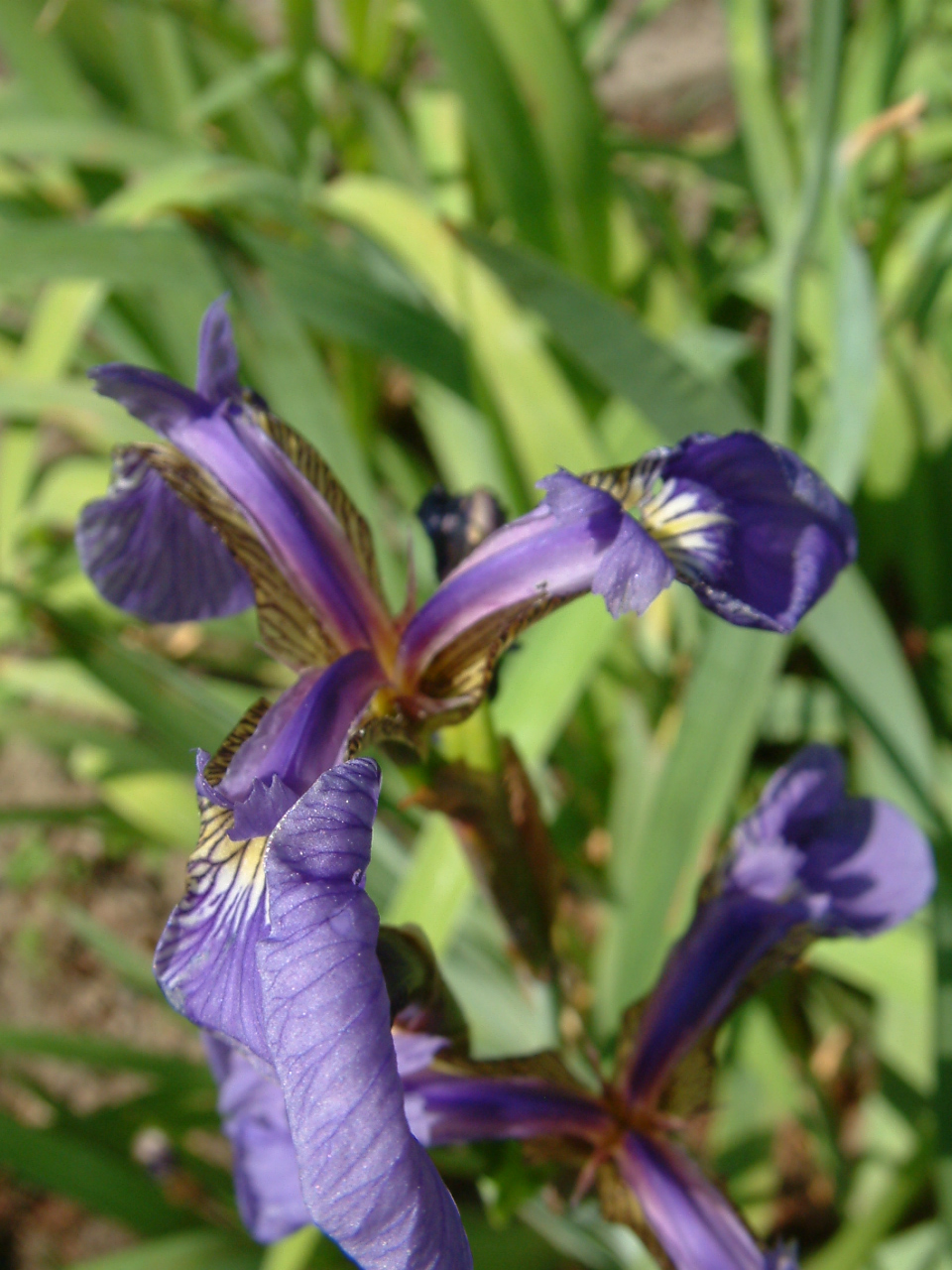
Iris setosa

The data set contains a set of 150 records under five attributes: sepal length, sepal width, petal length, petal width and species.

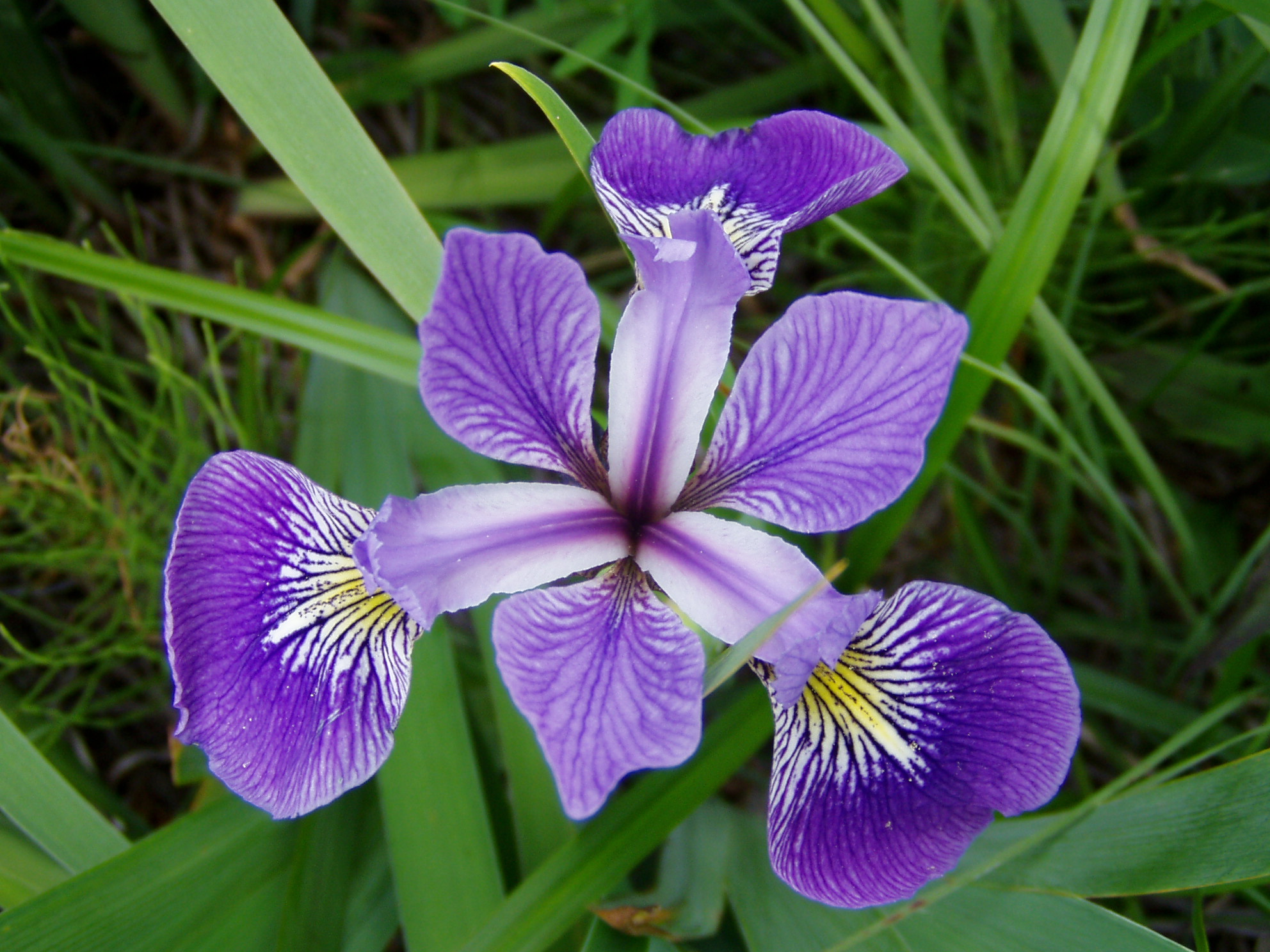
Iris versicolor

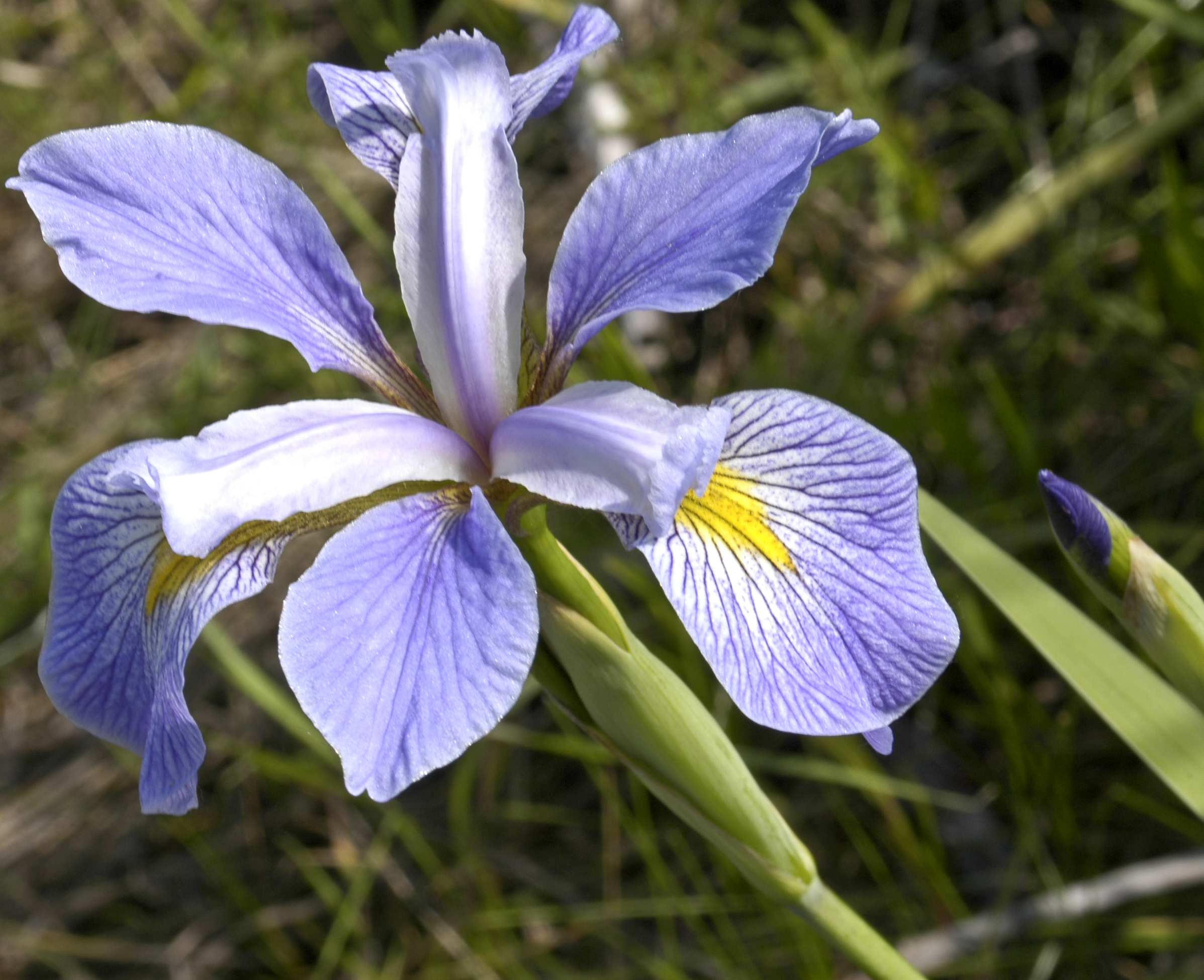
Iris virginica

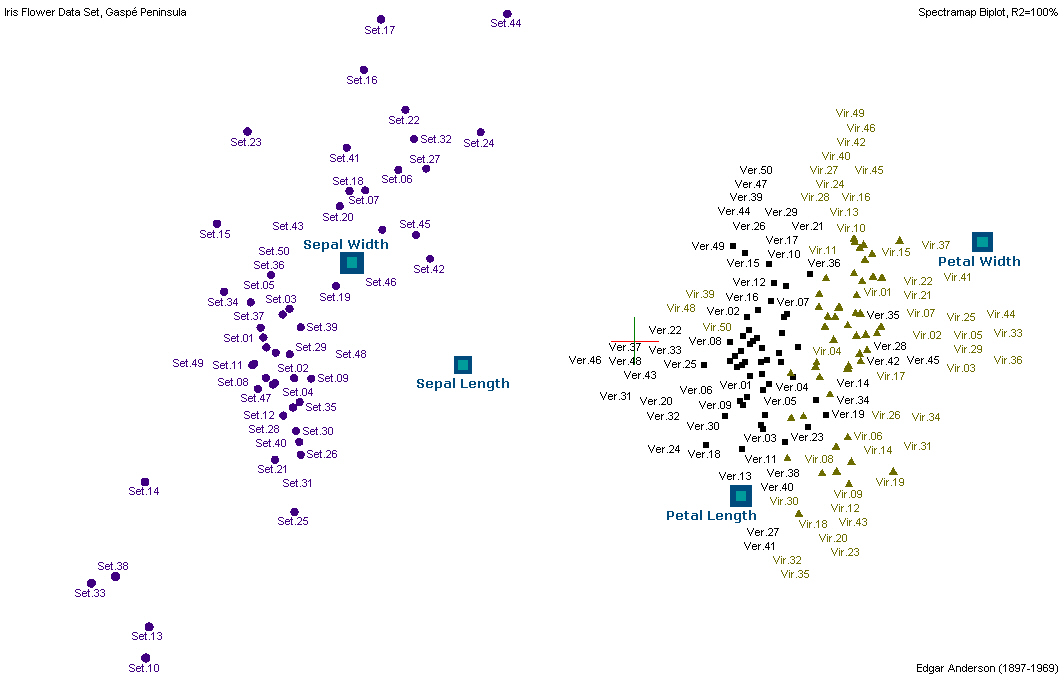
Spectramap biplot of Fisher's iris data set

Fisher's Iris data
Data set order	Sepal length	Sepal width	Petal length	Petal width	Species
1	5.1	3.5	1.4	0.2	I. setosa
2	4.9	3.0	1.4	0.2	I. setosa
3	4.7	3.2	1.3	0.2	I. setosa
4	4.6	3.1	1.5	0.2	I. setosa
5	5.0	3.6	1.4	0.3	I. setosa
6	5.4	3.9	1.7	0.4	I. setosa
7	4.6	3.4	1.4	0.3	I. setosa
8	5.0	3.4	1.5	0.2	I. setosa
9	4.4	2.9	1.4	0.2	I. setosa
10	4.9	3.1	1.5	0.1	I. setosa
11	5.4	3.7	1.5	0.2	I. setosa
12	4.8	3.4	1.6	0.2	I. setosa
13	4.8	3.0	1.4	0.1	I. setosa
14	4.3	3.0	1.1	0.1	I. setosa
15	5.8	4.0	1.2	0.2	I. setosa
16	5.7	4.4	1.5	0.4	I. setosa
17	5.4	3.9	1.3	0.4	I. setosa
18	5.1	3.5	1.4	0.3	I. setosa
19	5.7	3.8	1.7	0.3	I. setosa
20	5.1	3.8	1.5	0.3	I. setosa
21	5.4	3.4	1.7	0.2	I. setosa
22	5.1	3.7	1.5	0.4	I. setosa
23	4.6	3.6	1.0	0.2	I. setosa
24	5.1	3.3	1.7	0.5	I. setosa
25	4.8	3.4	1.9	0.2	I. setosa
26	5.0	3.0	1.6	0.2	I. setosa
27	5.0	3.4	1.6	0.4	I. setosa
28	5.2	3.5	1.5	0.2	I. setosa
29	5.2	3.4	1.4	0.2	I. setosa
30	4.7	3.2	1.6	0.2	I. setosa
31	4.8	3.1	1.6	0.2	I. setosa
32	5.4	3.4	1.5	0.4	I. setosa
33	5.2	4.1	1.5	0.1	I. setosa
34	5.5	4.2	1.4	0.2	I. setosa
35	4.9	3.1	1.5	0.2	I. setosa
36	5.0	3.2	1.2	0.2	I. setosa
37	5.5	3.5	1.3	0.2	I. setosa
38	4.9	3.6	1.4	0.1	I. setosa
39	4.4	3.0	1.3	0.2	I. setosa
40	5.1	3.4	1.5	0.2	I. setosa
41	5.0	3.5	1.3	0.3	I. setosa
42	4.5	2.3	1.3	0.3	I. setosa
43	4.4	3.2	1.3	0.2	I. setosa
44	5.0	3.5	1.6	0.6	I. setosa
45	5.1	3.8	1.9	0.4	I. setosa
46	4.8	3.0	1.4	0.3	I. setosa
47	5.1	3.8	1.6	0.2	I. setosa
48	4.6	3.2	1.4	0.2	I. setosa
49	5.3	3.7	1.5	0.2	I. setosa
50	5.0	3.3	1.4	0.2	I. setosa
51	7.0	3.2	4.7	1.4	I. versicolor
52	6.4	3.2	4.5	1.5	I. versicolor
53	6.9	3.1	4.9	1.5	I. versicolor
54	5.5	2.3	4.0	1.3	I. versicolor
55	6.5	2.8	4.6	1.5	I. versicolor
56	5.7	2.8	4.5	1.3	I. versicolor
57	6.3	3.3	4.7	1.6	I. versicolor
58	4.9	2.4	3.3	1.0	I. versicolor
59	6.6	2.9	4.6	1.3	I. versicolor
60	5.2	2.7	3.9	1.4	I. versicolor
61	5.0	2.0	3.5	1.0	I. versicolor
62	5.9	3.0	4.2	1.5	I. versicolor
63	6.0	2.2	4.0	1.0	I. versicolor
64	6.1	2.9	4.7	1.4	I. versicolor
65	5.6	2.9	3.6	1.3	I. versicolor
66	6.7	3.1	4.4	1.4	I. versicolor
67	5.6	3.0	4.5	1.5	I. versicolor
68	5.8	2.7	4.1	1.0	I. versicolor
69	6.2	2.2	4.5	1.5	I. versicolor
70	5.6	2.5	3.9	1.1	I. versicolor
71	5.9	3.2	4.8	1.8	I. versicolor
72	6.1	2.8	4.0	1.3	I. versicolor
73	6.3	2.5	4.9	1.5	I. versicolor
74	6.1	2.8	4.7	1.2	I. versicolor
75	6.4	2.9	4.3	1.3	I. versicolor
76	6.6	3.0	4.4	1.4	I. versicolor
77	6.8	2.8	4.8	1.4	I. versicolor
78	6.7	3.0	5.0	1.7	I. versicolor
79	6.0	2.9	4.5	1.5	I. versicolor
80	5.7	2.6	3.5	1.0	I. versicolor
81	5.5	2.4	3.8	1.1	I. versicolor
82	5.5	2.4	3.7	1.0	I. versicolor
83	5.8	2.7	3.9	1.2	I. versicolor
84	6.0	2.7	5.1	1.6	I. versicolor
85	5.4	3.0	4.5	1.5	I. versicolor
86	6.0	3.4	4.5	1.6	I. versicolor
87	6.7	3.1	4.7	1.5	I. versicolor
88	6.3	2.3	4.4	1.3	I. versicolor
89	5.6	3.0	4.1	1.3	I. versicolor
90	5.5	2.5	4.0	1.3	I. versicolor
91	5.5	2.6	4.4	1.2	I. versicolor
92	6.1	3.0	4.6	1.4	I. versicolor
93	5.8	2.6	4.0	1.2	I. versicolor
94	5.0	2.3	3.3	1.0	I. versicolor
95	5.6	2.7	4.2	1.3	I. versicolor
96	5.7	3.0	4.2	1.2	I. versicolor
97	5.7	2.9	4.2	1.3	I. versicolor
98	6.2	2.9	4.3	1.3	I. versicolor
99	5.1	2.5	3.0	1.1	I. versicolor
100	5.7	2.8	4.1	1.3	I. versicolor
101	6.3	3.3	6.0	2.5	I. virginica
102	5.8	2.7	5.1	1.9	I. virginica
103	7.1	3.0	5.9	2.1	I. virginica
104	6.3	2.9	5.6	1.8	I. virginica
105	6.5	3.0	5.8	2.2	I. virginica
106	7.6	3.0	6.6	2.1	I. virginica
107	4.9	2.5	4.5	1.7	I. virginica
108	7.3	2.9	6.3	1.8	I. virginica
109	6.7	2.5	5.8	1.8	I. virginica
110	7.2	3.6	6.1	2.5	I. virginica
111	6.5	3.2	5.1	2.0	I. virginica
112	6.4	2.7	5.3	1.9	I. virginica
113	6.8	3.0	5.5	2.1	I. virginica
114	5.7	2.5	5.0	2.0	I. virginica
115	5.8	2.8	5.1	2.4	I. virginica
116	6.4	3.2	5.3	2.3	I. virginica
117	6.5	3.0	5.5	1.8	I. virginica
118	7.7	3.8	6.7	2.2	I. virginica
119	7.7	2.6	6.9	2.3	I. virginica
120	6.0	2.2	5.0	1.5	I. virginica
121	6.9	3.2	5.7	2.3	I. virginica
122	5.6	2.8	4.9	2.0	I. virginica
123	7.7	2.8	6.7	2.0	I. virginica
124	6.3	2.7	4.9	1.8	I. virginica
125	6.7	3.3	5.7	2.1	I. virginica
126	7.2	3.2	6.0	1.8	I. virginica
127	6.2	2.8	4.8	1.8	I. virginica
128	6.1	3.0	4.9	1.8	I. virginica
129	6.4	2.8	5.6	2.1	I. virginica
130	7.2	3.0	5.8	1.6	I. virginica
131	7.4	2.8	6.1	1.9	I. virginica
132	7.9	3.8	6.4	2.0	I. virginica
133	6.4	2.8	5.6	2.2	I. virginica
134	6.3	2.8	5.1	1.5	I. virginica
135	6.1	2.6	5.6	1.4	I. virginica
136	7.7	3.0	6.1	2.3	I. virginica
137	6.3	3.4	5.6	2.4	I. virginica
138	6.4	3.1	5.5	1.8	I. virginica
139	6.0	3.0	4.8	1.8	I. virginica
140	6.9	3.1	5.4	2.1	I. virginica
141	6.7	3.1	5.6	2.4	I. virginica
142	6.9	3.1	5.1	2.3	I. virginica
143	5.8	2.7	5.1	1.9	I. virginica
144	6.8	3.2	5.9	2.3	I. virginica
145	6.7	3.3	5.7	2.5	I. virginica
146	6.7	3.0	5.2	2.3	I. virginica
147	6.3	2.5	5.0	1.9	I. virginica
148	6.5	3.0	5.2	2.0	I. virginica
149	6.2	3.4	5.4	2.3	I. virginica
150	5.9	3.0	5.1	1.8	I. virginica

The iris data set is widely used as a beginner's data set for machine learning purposes. The data set is included in R base and Python in the machine learning library scikit-learn, so that users can access it without having to find a source for it.

Several versions of the data set have been published.

=== R code illustrating usage ===
The example R code shown below reproduce the scatterplot displayed at the top of this article:

# Show the data set
iris
# Show the help page, with information about the data set
?iris

# Create scatterplots of all pairwise combination of the 4 variables in the data set
pairs(iris[1:4], main="Iris Data (red=setosa,green=versicolor,blue=virginica)",
      pch=21, bg=c("red","green3","blue")[unclass(iris$Species)])
 

# Alternatively using ggplot and ggally.
install.packages(c("ggplot2","GGally")) # install packages if you don't have it.

#Load libraries.
library(ggplot2)
library(GGally)

# Plot scatter plot matrix for the iris data set
ggpairs(data = iris, # your iris data
        columns = 1:4, # columns for the scatter plot 
        mapping = aes(colour = Species,fill = Species),
        title = 'Scatter Plot Matrix for Iris Data Set',
        ) +
  theme(plot.title = element_text(hjust = 0.5,face = 'bold')) +
  scale_color_brewer(palette = 'Set1')

=== Python code illustrating usage ===
from sklearn.datasets import load_iris

iris = load_iris()
print(iris)

This code gives:

{'data': array([[5.1, 3.5, 1.4, 0.2],
                [4.9, 3., 1.4, 0.2],
                [4.7, 3.2, 1.3, 0.2],
                [4.6, 3.1, 1.5, 0.2],...
'target': array([0, 0, 0, ... 1, 1, 1, ... 2, 2, 2, ...
'target_names': array(['setosa', 'versicolor', 'virginica'], dtype='<U10'),
...}

== See also ==
- Classic data sets
- List of datasets for machine-learning research
