= Kappa Pi =

International art honor society

- ΚΠ
- Founded: 1911; 115 years ago University of Kentucky
- Type: Honor
- Affiliation: Independent
- Status: Active
- Emphasis: Art
- Scope: International
- Motto: "Art Colors Life and Enriches Living"
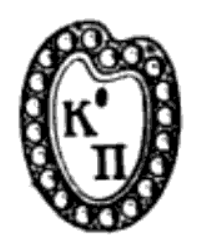
- Member badge
- Colors: Purple and Gold
- Flower: Purple Iris
- Publication: The Sketchbook and SketchPad
- Chapters: 360
- Headquarters: 307 South Fifth Avenue; Cleveland, Mississippi 38732; United States
- Website: www.kappapiart.com

Kappa Pi (ΚΠ) International Art Honor Society is an international collegiate art honor fraternity that was established at the University of Kentucky in Lexington, Kentucky in 1911. It is the oldest collegiate art fraternity and is open to any student who has talent for or supports visual art. Kappa Pi has 360 collegiate chapters across the United States, the Philippines, and Mexico.

== History ==
Kappa Pi was founded in 1911 as an art club by students of the University of Kentucky to unite artists who care about art and its role in life. This fraternity bonds artists together to form a unit that is influential in the art department as well as the community. Its founding members were W. C. Halbert, O. P. Gerhard, H. C. Williams, William Baughn, and F. C. Mueller.

By 1914, the art club or Alpha chapter had grown into a fully functioning fraternity with six active members, ten pledges, one faculty member, and one member urbe (now called an associate). Kappa Pi began its national expansion in 1914 with the establishment of the Beta chapter at Centre College in Danville, Kentucky, Gamma chapter at Columbia University in New York City, New York, Delta chapter at Vanderbilt University in Nashville, Tennessee, Epsilon chapter at Purdue University in West Lafayette, Indiana, and Phi chapter at Ohio State University in Columbus, Ohio.

In 1915, according to The Kentuckian Yearbook, the fraternity had a publication called The Quill and Inkhorn and had adopted the pansy as its flower and as its colors lavender and old gold. In the following year, the Alpha chapter grew to thirteen active members and the first honorary members, Dr. Alexander St. Clair Mackenzie and H. C. Norwood. Included in the chapter roll was the first appearance of the National Chapter Roll, listing four active chapters and two inactive chapters. Both the Delta and Epsilon chapters had gone inactive.

The fraternity continued to see growth with the chartering of the Zeta chapter at the University of Tennessee in Knoxville, Tennessee in 1918. Kappa Pi's first appearance was in the Miscellaneous Fraternities section of the 9th volume of Baird's Manual of American College Fraternities in 1920. At the time of publication it listed its colors as purple and gold, as well as the first five chapters.

The first International chapter of Kappa Pi was established in the Philippines in 1963. Another international chapter was chartered in Mexico.

Kappa Pi's mission is:

"The purpose of this Fraternity will be to form bodies of representative students who will, by their influence and artistic interests, uphold the highest ideals of a liberal education; to provide a means whereby students with artistic commitment meet for informal study and communication; to raise the standards of productive artistic work among the students in the colleges and universities; to furnish the highest reward for conscientious effort in furthering the best interest of art in the broadest sense of the term, by election to membership in the Fraternity, based upon such meritorious work."

== Symbols and traditions ==
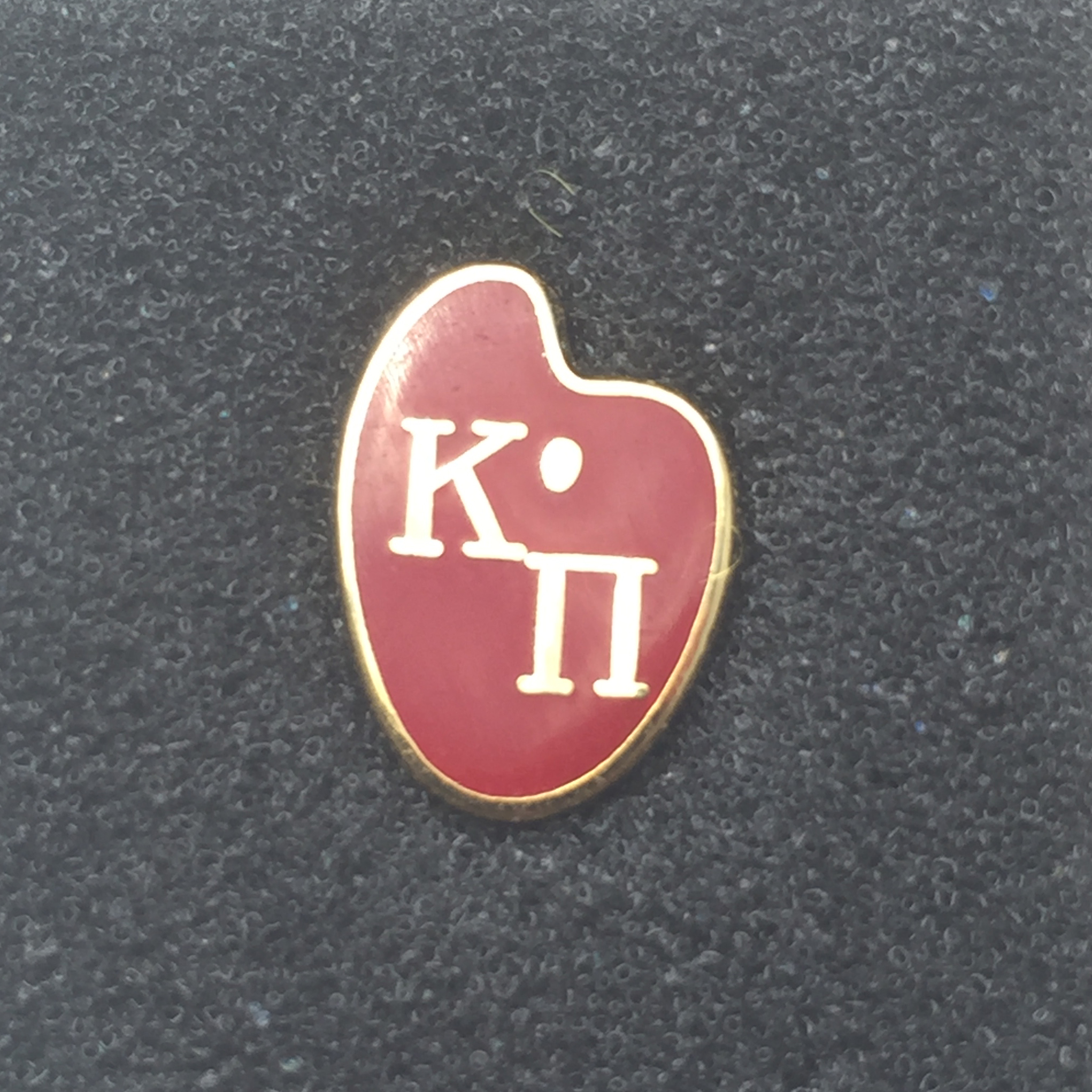
Membership Pin of Kappa Pi

Kappa Pi's mission state is "Art colors life and enriches living".

=== Membership pin ===
The membership pin of Kappa Pi is a garnet paint palette with gold metal trim and gold Greek letters of Kappa (Κ) and Pi (Π). It was designed by Balfour Co. and Charles R. Morse, a member of the Zeta chapter of the University of Tennessee, and it was formally adopted in 1934 at the first National Conference.

=== Colors ===
The official colors of Kappa Pi are purple and gold. The original colors of lavender and old gold were adopted by the Alpha chapter in 1911, but purple and gold were officially adopted at the first National Conference in 1934. Purple is used to represent sincerity, and gold is used to represent the truth.

=== Flower ===
The purple iris is the official flower of Kappa Pi; it was adopted in 1934 at the first National Conference. It is used to represent excellence. Before the first National Conference, the Kappa Pi flower was the pansy.

=== Coat of arms ===
The shield of Kappa Pi is divided into three parts by a combination of dividers in the head of a T-square. The top part is colored red and the bottom part is blue. Around the shield is a wide white or silver border on which is charged in the upper left-hand corner a sphinx. In the upper right is a four-leafed flower, while draped around the bottom is a link chain fastened at the end with a five-pointed star and chained in the center with a lock.

In the center of the shield is the top of an Ionian column supporting a lamp of knowledge. The crest consists of the conventionalized crest wreath, upon which rests a palette with three brushes inserted into it. The mantling is gracefully draped around this. The stroll ribbon beneath the escutcheon carries the Greek name Kappa Pi in upper and lower case Greek letters. The shield stands for protection. The three divisions of the shield stand for the active chapter, the alumnae, and school affiliation. The dividers stand for equality and have a further connotation in that as they describe a true and complete circle, they stand for friendship.

The Coat of Arms was registered with the U. S. Patent Office in 1972.

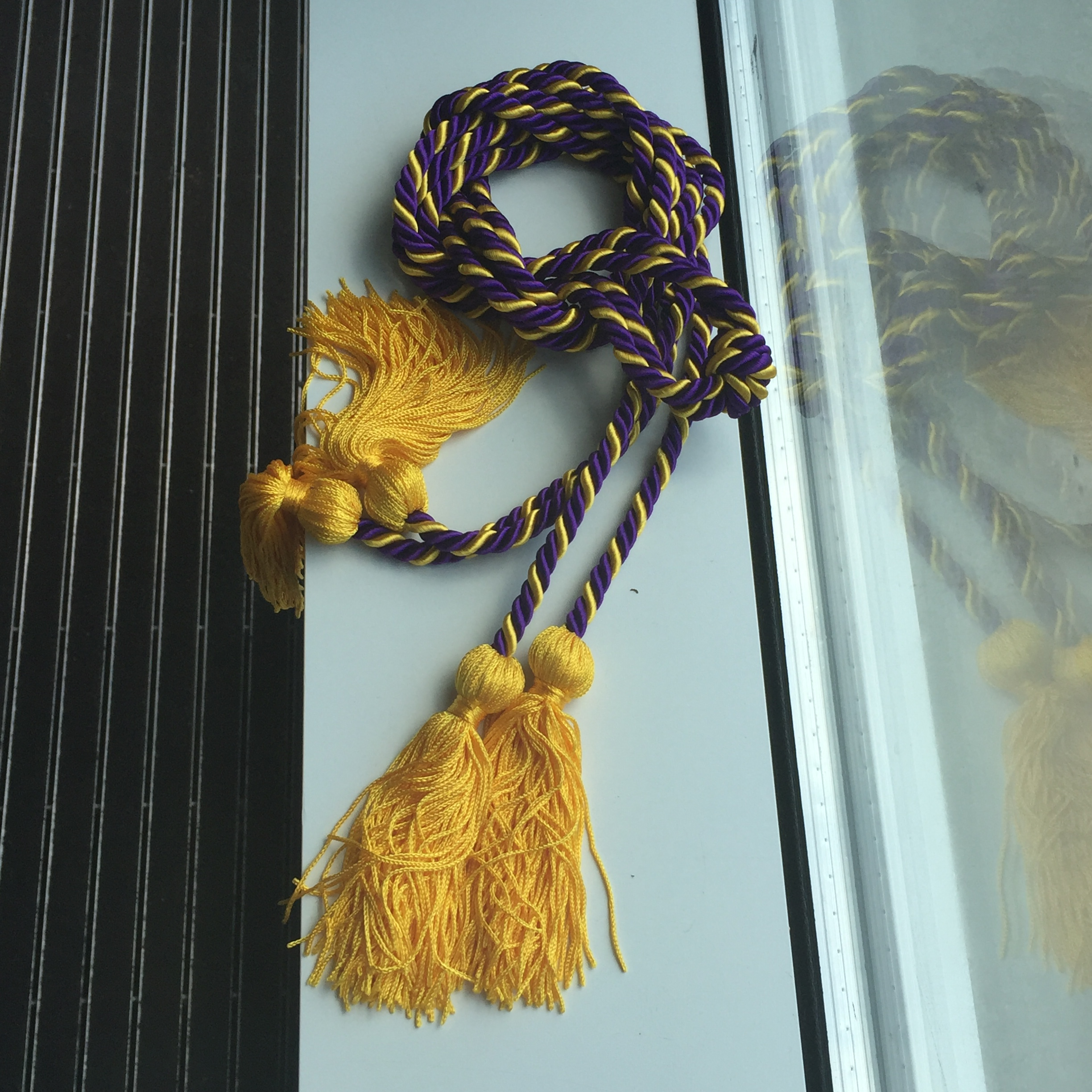
Honor Cord of Kappa Pi

=== Honor cord ===
The Kappa Pi Honor Cord is presented to all active members upon graduation from an active collegiate chapter. The design of the cord is two separate - three tiers spiral, two purple and one gold, with gold tassels.

=== Seal ===
The Seal of Kappa Pi is a metallic purple circular seal with gold writing. The center bears the coat of arms of the fraternity and is surrounded by the full name of the fraternity. The Seal is present on all Kappa Pi membership shingles.

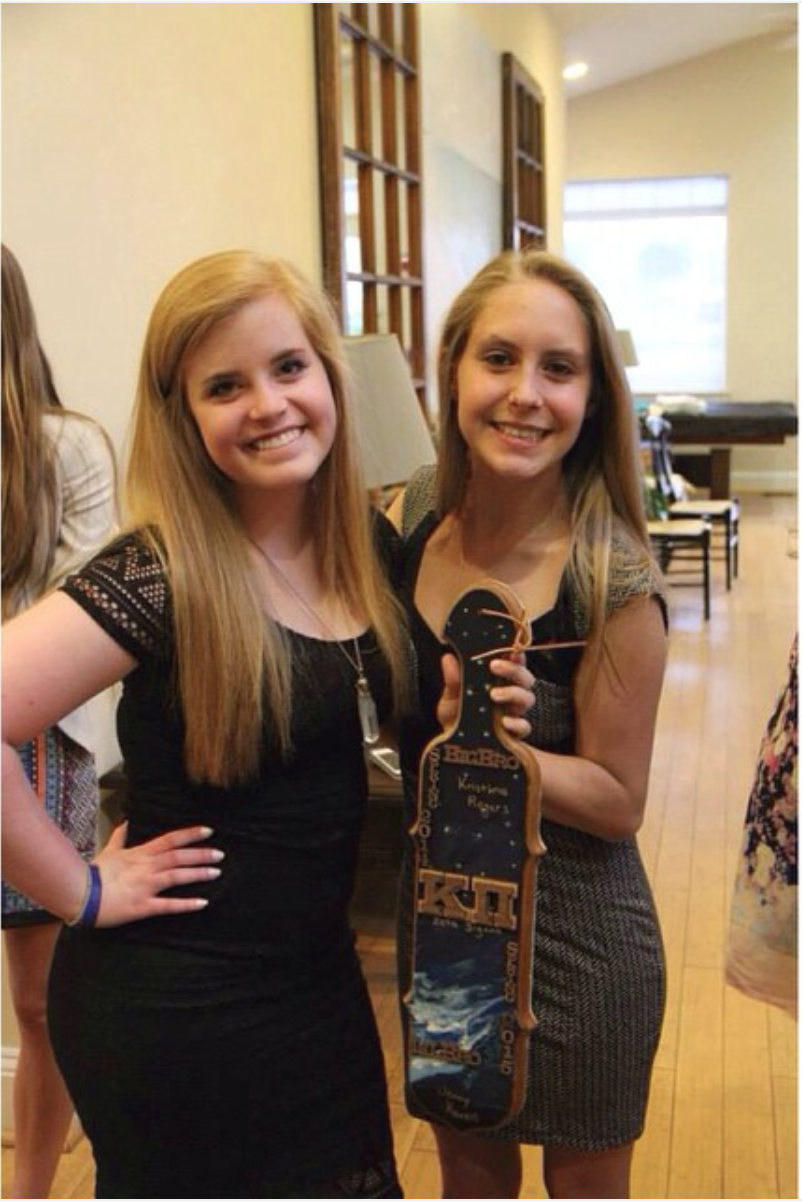
Pledge Paddle - Zeta Sigma chapter of Kappa Pi

=== Pledge Paddle ===
One main tradition of chapters is the creation of a Pledge Paddle by the big brother/sister with the incoming member. A tradition in the case of historically black colleges and universities (HBCU) chapters is, after the incoming members complete becoming active members, an unveiling/probate show is produced to announce to the college/university community the members' newfound status in the fraternity.

=== Publications ===
Before the first National Conference in 1935, the publication of Kappa Pi was The Quill and Inkhorn. Today, The Sketchbook is the official magazine of Kappa Pi. It is a yearly magazine published each spring that highlights the achievements of the active collegiate chapter, newly inducted members, honorary member inductions, and new chapter charters. The Sketchbook began publishing in 1932; its first editor-in-chief was Marie B. Ryan. The Sketch Pad is the office newsletter of Kappa Pi.

== Membership ==
The fiscal year for Kappa Pi is from September 1 to May 31 of any year. Initiations can be held at any time during the fiscal year, at the discretion of the university art department and chapter sponsors.

Membership in Kappa Pi is divided into six classes: active: alumni, sponsor, faculty, associate, honorary, patron, and life. Active membership is composed of those matriculates of the colleges, universities, and art schools having chapters of Kappa Pi, who have been regularly elected to membership in the Fraternity, and who have been duly initiated into membership according to the Ritual and Laws of the Fraternity.

Although chapters may raise these requirements, the minimum requirements for consideration are:

1. completion of twelve semester hours, or its equivalent, of art with a B average in these art subjects, or
2. one year of professional work in some field of art.

Active members transfer to Alumni membership after they graduate. Associate, patron, faculty, sponsor and honorary membership can be bestowed under guidelines established by the International Constitution. Associate members are supporters of the arts and of Kappa Pi. They are recognized for their support of the arts for the chapter, school, or community. They pay or their chapter may pay the regular initiation fee and annual international dues thereafter. Associate members have no voting power.

The fraternity grants patron membership to those who contribute generously in the field of art through gifts, endowments, and art scholarships that enrich the community and/or institutions near which a collegiate chapter is located. Faculty members who are interested in art are invited by the local chapter to affiliate based on payment of International dues with no initiation fee. Sponsors are members who do not go through the ritual of the fraternity and have no voting power outside their institutional chapter.

Honorary Members are members who have achieved outstanding recognition in the visual arts. They are proposed for membership through any active collegiate chapter. Life membership is open to any member in the above categories who contributes to the International Scholarship Endowment.

== Activities ==
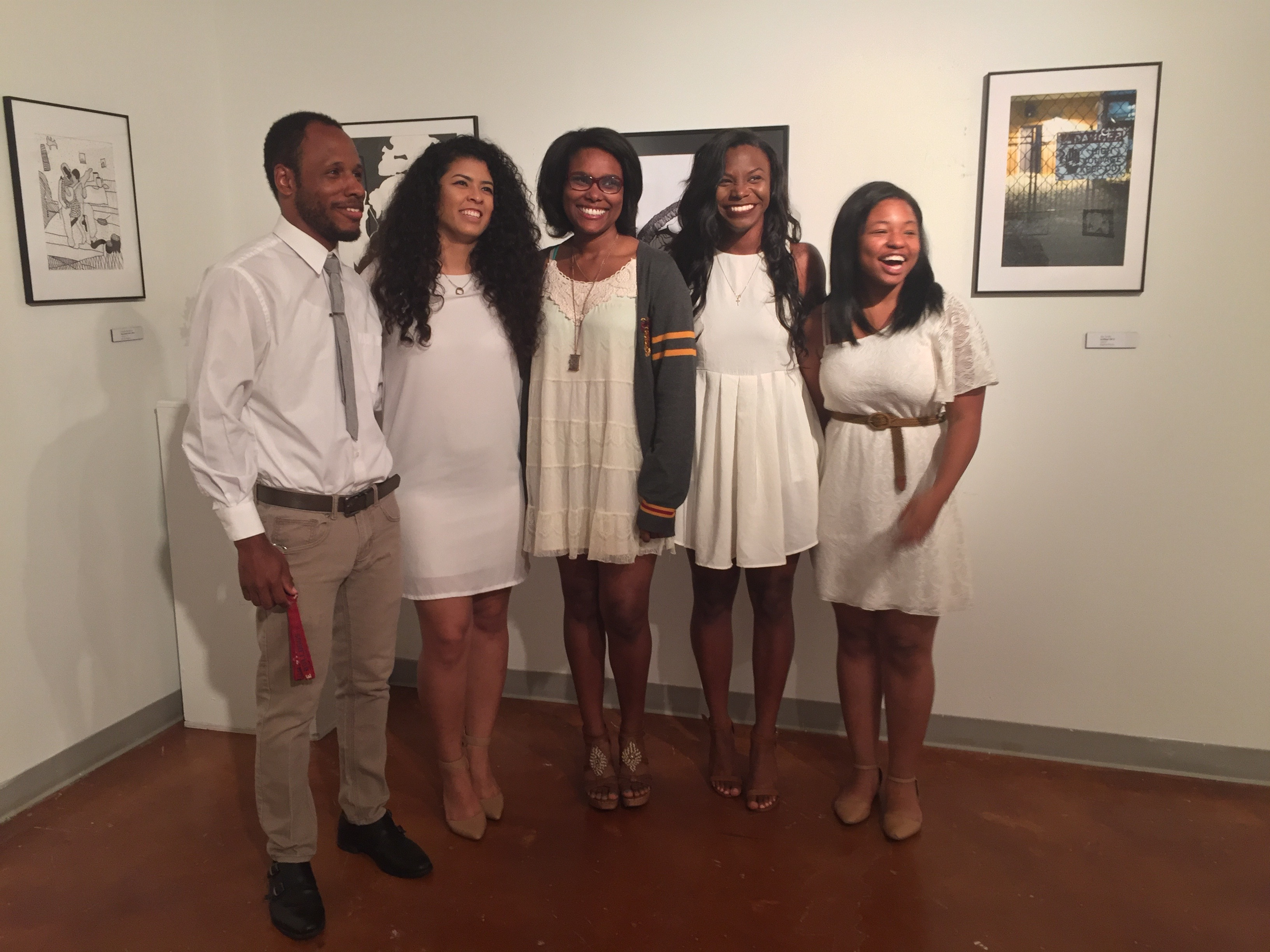
Eta Iota chapter, spring 2016 induction

Some chapters meet once a month, while others may meet every week. Some chapters help out at monthly art department exhibitions and other department functions, sponsor museum trips, host regional high school exhibitions, and assist with art programs at local elementary and high schools.

Traditions differ greatly from chapter to chapter, and many go unwritten. Many chapters adopt their own philanthropy in the areas of art therapy, art education, community arts programs and projects, and art education advocacy. chapters also assign to each incoming member a big brother/sister to assist in the process of becoming a member of the chapter.

== Governance ==
=== Collegiate chapters ===
The Executive Council has the power to grant charters to new chapters and to withdraw any charter at its discretion. A two-thirds vote is required to grant a charter, and a unanimous vote is required for a withdrawal of a charter. Each chapter is chartered under the name of the institution where it is located, and will also be designated by Greek letters which will be bestowed by its date of founding in regular sequence, as Alpha, Beta, and Gamma; and when doubling of letters shall be required, Alpha Alpha, Alpha Beta, etc., are used.

=== Chapter by-laws ===
The international office does require that by-laws be written by individual chapters. Each chapter is unique and could conceivably need different governing laws as determined by the international bylaws. Each chapter should identify its methods for selecting members. Some chapters alter the academic requirements to a higher standard than the international level or may adjust membership status to suit their needs. At no point can the bylaws be less than the standards determined by the international office. Because of this, the vast majority of chapters operate under the blanket bylaws of the fraternity. This ensures that they are performing up to our level, and also offers a structure to use as guidelines. If significant changes are made to the by-laws provided by the fraternity, it is necessary to send a copy to the international office for executive approval.

=== International organization ===
Kappa Pi holds an international conference every year at the inference of the international president and the executive council, or by the request of chapters by formal petition. The first International conference of Kappa Pi, then only a national fraternity, was held in 1934 in Chicago, Illinois. The first constitution was ratified with the following offices elected: president, first vice-president, second vice-president, secretary, editor, alumni director, director of exhibits, historian, and librarian.

The International Officers of Kappa Pi are the president, vice-president, secretary, treasurer, historian, editor, and parliamentarian (at the president's appointment). The executive council is composed of international officers as well as the immediate past president. It has the power to grant chapter charters as well as revoke them. The international assembly of Kappa Pi is composed of a member of all active chapters at the appointment of their chapter president and the assistance of the chapter's executive council. The international assembly convenes at every international conference to act in the best interest of the fraternity as a whole. The assembly has the power to overturn rulings of the executive council with a two-thirds majority vote.

== See also ==
- Honor cords
- Professional fraternities and sororities
