= Checkered Flag =

Checkered Flag or Chequered Flag may refer to:

- Checkered flag, or chequered flag, a type of racing flag

== Films ==
- The Checkered Flag (1926 film), an American silent drama film
- The Checkered Flag (1963 film), a film directed by William Grefe
- The Checkered Flag (1967 film) or Devil's Angels, an American outlaw biker film
- Checkered Flag (film), a 1990 film by John Glen and Michael Levine

== Music ==
- Checkered Flag (album), a 1963 album by Dick Dale and his Del-Tones
- "The Chequered Flag (Dead or Alive)", a song by Jethro Tull from Too Old to Rock 'n' Roll: Too Young to Die!

== Video games ==
- Chequered Flag (video game), a 1983 game by Sinclair Research Ltd.
- Chequered Flag, a 1988 racing arcade game by Konami, see list of Konami games
- Checkered Flag (1991 video game), for Atari Lynx video game
- Checkered Flag (1994 video game) for the Atari Jaguar
