= Flagstone (disambiguation) =

A flagstone is a flat stone used for paving, fencing, or roofing.

Flagstone may refer to:

== Places ==
- Flagstone, Queensland, Australia
- Flagstone Creek, Queensland, Australia
- Flagstones Enclosure, a Neolithic ditch enclosure in Dorset, England

== Other uses ==
- Flagstone, a fictional town in the film Once Upon a Time in the West
- The Flagstones, working title of the TV show The Flintstones
