= Sweet flag (disambiguation) =

Sweet flag is the common name for the flowering plant Acorus calamus.

Sweet flag may also refer to

- Japanese sweet flag or grassy-leaved sweet flag (Acorus gramineus)
- American sweet flag (Acorus americanus)

== See also ==
- Spreadwing
