= Edmund Flagg =

American novelist

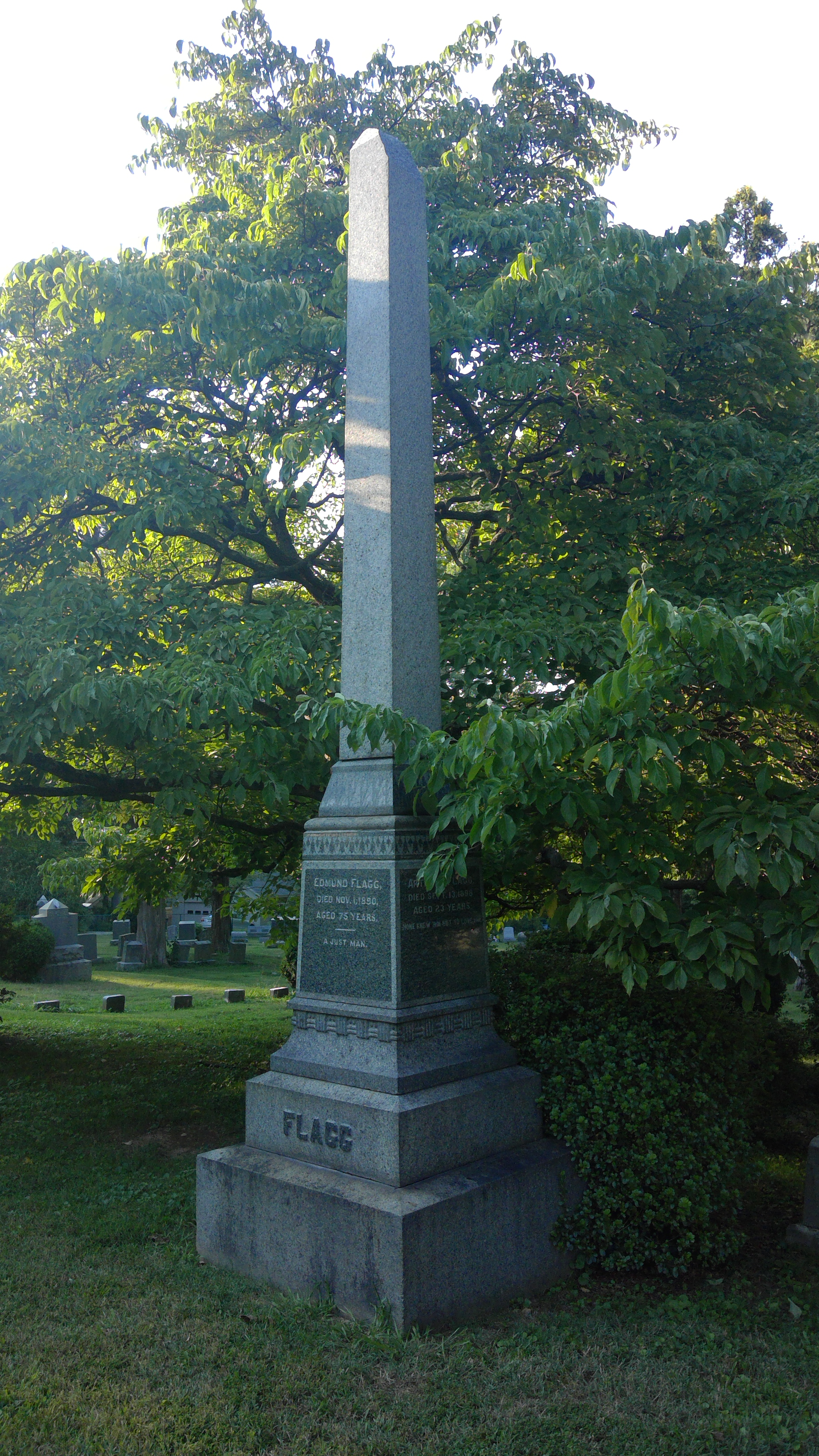
Grave of Edmund Flagg, at Oakwood Cemetery, Falls Church, Virginia

Edmund Flagg (c. 1815–1890) was an American writer, lawyer, and diplomat.

== Literary works ==
- The Far West: or, A Tour Beyond the Mountains (1838)
- Carrero, or, The Prime Minister, a Tale of Spain (1843)
- Francis of Valois, or, The Curse of St. Valliar, a tale of the middle ages (1843)
- The Howard Queen, a romance of history (1848)
- Venice: The City of the Sea From the Invasion by Napoleon in 1797 to the Capitulation to Radetzky, in 1849 (1853)
- Report on the Commercial Relations All of the United States Foreign With All Nations (1857)
- Edmond Dantes: The Sequel to Alexander Dumas' Celebrated Novel The Count of Monte Cristo (1884)
- Monte-Cristo's Daughter sequel to Alexander Dumas' great novel, the "Count of Monte-Cristo," and Conclusion of "Edmond Dantes" (1884)
- De Molai: The Last of the Military Grand Masters of the Order of Knights Templar: A Romance of History (1888)
