= Flagger (disambiguation) =

A flagger is a traffic guard who directs traffic with flags.

Flagger may also refer to:

- A member of Color guard (flag spinning)
- A performer of the Italian art of flag throwing
- A flagging dance
- Flaggers (movement), in the Southern U.S., devoted to making the Confederate battle flag more visible

== See also ==
- Flagging (disambiguation)
