= White Flag =

White Flag may refer to:

- White flag, a white-colored flag used in various contexts, especially war

== Music ==
=== Bands ===
- White Flag (band), an American punk rock band
- Whiteflag Project, formerly known as Whiteflag, world fusion band from Israel and Gaza Strip
- Passion: White Flag, an album by the Passion Worship Band

=== Songs ===
- "White Flag" (Dido song)
- "White Flag" (Passion song)
- "White Flag", a song by Clairo from Immunity
- "White Flag", a song by Bishop Briggs from Church of Scars
- "White Flag", a song by Sabrina Carpenter from Can't Blame a Girl for Trying and Eyes Wide Open
- "White Flag", a song by Far East Movement from Free Wired
- "White Flag", a song by Gorillaz from Plastic Beach
- "White Flag", a song by Guided by Voices from The Bears for Lunch
- "White Flag", a song by Joseph from I'm Alone, No You're Not
- "White Flag", a song by September from Love CPR

== Other uses ==
- White Flag (painting), a painting by Jasper Johns
- White Flags, a rebel group in Iraq
- White Flag case, a Court case in Sri Lanka
- White Flag incident, a massacre in Sri Lanka
- Communist Party of Burma or white flags
