= Flag, Missouri =

Extinct hamlet in Missouri, U.S.

Coordinates: 36°37′26″N 93°18′00″W

Flag is an extinct community in Taney County, in the U.S. state of Missouri. It was on the west side of the county, near the Stone County line, a bit north of the present day location of the Table Rock Dam.

A post office called Flag was established in 1900, and remained in operation until 1927. Flag once contained a schoolhouse, which is now defunct. Some say the community was named after the American flag, while others believe it was named for a flag station near the original town site.
