= Norman G. Flagg =

American businessman, farmer, and politician

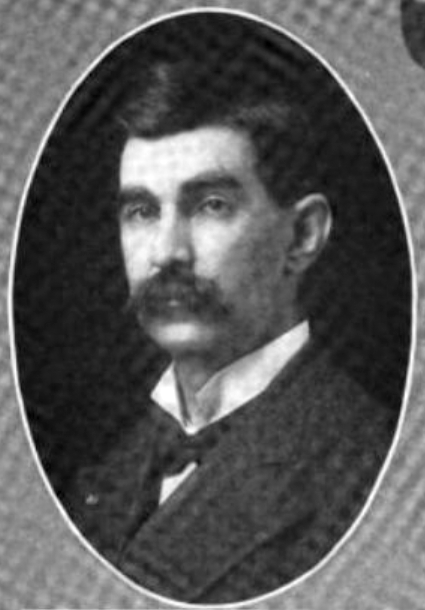

Member of the Illinois Senate
- In office 1926–1932
- In office 1938–1946

Member of the Illinois House of Representatives
- In office 1908–1926

Personal details
- Born: Norman Gershom Flagg; August 4, 1867 Liberty Prairie, Illinois
- Died: May 16, 1948 (aged 80) Liberty Prairie, Illinois
- Party: Republican
- Parent: Willard Cutting Flagg (father)
- Education: Washington University in St. Louis
- Occupation: Farmer, businessman, politician

Norman Gershom Flagg (August 4, 1867 – May 16, 1948) was an American businessman, farmer, and politician.

== Biography ==
Flagg was born in Liberty Prairie, Madison County, Illinois. He went to the local public schools and graduated from Washington University in St. Louis. He was a farmer and was involved with farm mutual insurance. Flagg lived in Moro, Illinois with his wife and family. Flagg served on the Madison County Bar of Supervisors and was a Republican. He served in the Illinois House of Representatives from 1909 to 1927. Flagg then served in the Illinois Senate from 1927 to 1931 and from 1939 to 1947. He died at his home in Liberty Prairie, Illinois, from a long illness. His father Willard Cutting Flagg also served in the Illinois General Assembly.
