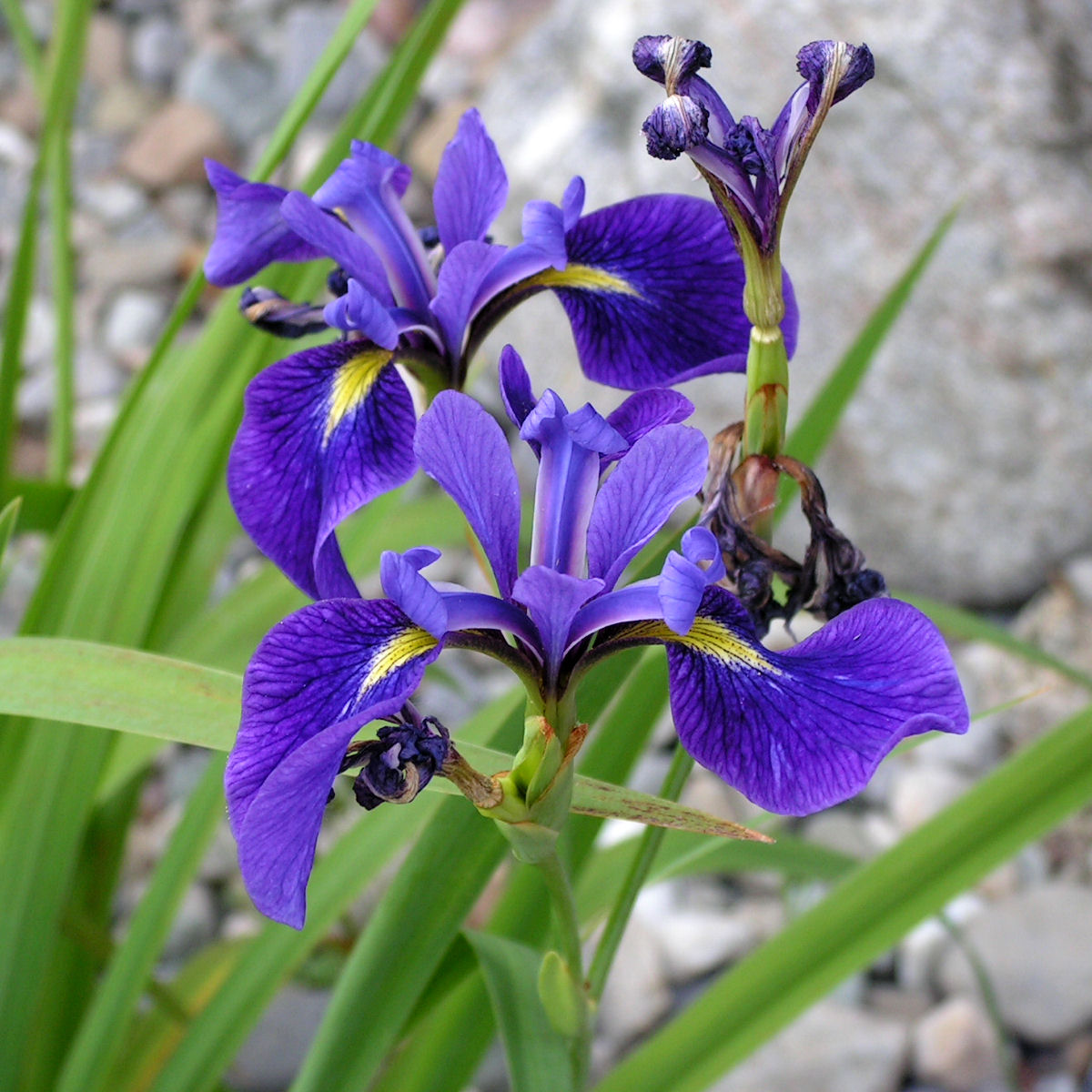

Conservation status
- Least Concern (IUCN 3.1)

Scientific classification
- Kingdom: Plantae
- Clade: Embryophytes
- Clade: Tracheophytes
- Clade: Angiosperms
- Clade: Monocots
- Order: Asparagales
- Family: Iridaceae
- Genus: Iris
- Subgenus: Iris subg. Limniris
- Section: Iris sect. Limniris
- Series: Iris ser. Laevigatae
- Species: I. versicolor

Binomial name
- Iris versicolor L.

= Iris versicolor =

Species of plant

Iris versicolor or Iris versicolour is also commonly known as the blue flag, harlequin blueflag, larger blue flag, northern blue flag, and poison flag, plus other variations of these names, and in Great Britain and Ireland as purple iris.

It is a species of Iris native to North America, in Eastern Canada and the Eastern United States. It is common in sedge meadows, marshes, and along streambanks and shores. The specific epithet versicolor means "variously coloured".

It is one of the three Iris species in the Iris flower data set outlined by Ronald Fisher in his 1936 paper "The use of multiple measurements in taxonomic problems" as an example of linear discriminant analysis.

== Description ==
Iris versicolor is a flowering herbaceous perennial plant, growing 10–80 cm (4–31 in) high. () It tends to form large clumps from thick, creeping rhizomes. The unwinged, erect stems generally have basal leaves that are more than 1 cm (1/2 in) wide. Leaves are folded on the midribs so that they form an overlapping flat fan. The well developed deep periwinkle flower has six petals and sepals spread out nearly flat and have two forms. The longer sepals are hairless and have a greenish-yellow blotch at their base. The inferior ovary is bluntly angled. Flowers are usually light to deep blue (purple and violet are not uncommon) and bloom during May to July. Fruit is a three-celled, bluntly angled capsule. The large seeds can be observed floating in fall.

=== Chemical constituents ===
The species has been implicated in several poisoning cases of humans and animals who consumed the rhizomes, which have been found to contain a glycoside, iridin. The sap can cause dermatitis in susceptible individuals.

== Toxicity and uses ==
Both the leaves and roots are poisonous, and can cause stomach and intestinal inflammation. Consuming the plant can be fatal to calves. Iris rhizomes and rootstocks contain a purgative irritant, called irisin, iridin, or irisine, causing gastroenteritis if ingested in large amounts, and may be protective against herbivory by rabbits and deer.

Blue iris was widely used medicinally by Native Americans externally on burns, wounds, swellings and sores, and internally for liver and kidney disease, among other uses.

The iris has been used as magical plant, with people carrying the root (or rhizome) to get 'financial gain', or placed in cash registers to increase business.

== Symbolism ==
The iris is the official state flower of the U.S. state of Tennessee. This designation was made in 1933 by the state legislature. Although the law does not specifically define a type of iris, it is generally accepted that the purple iris is the state flower.

The blue flag has been the provincial flower of Quebec since 1999, having replaced the Madonna lily which is not native to the province.

The purple iris is the official flower of Kappa Pi International Honorary Art Fraternity.

== Gallery ==
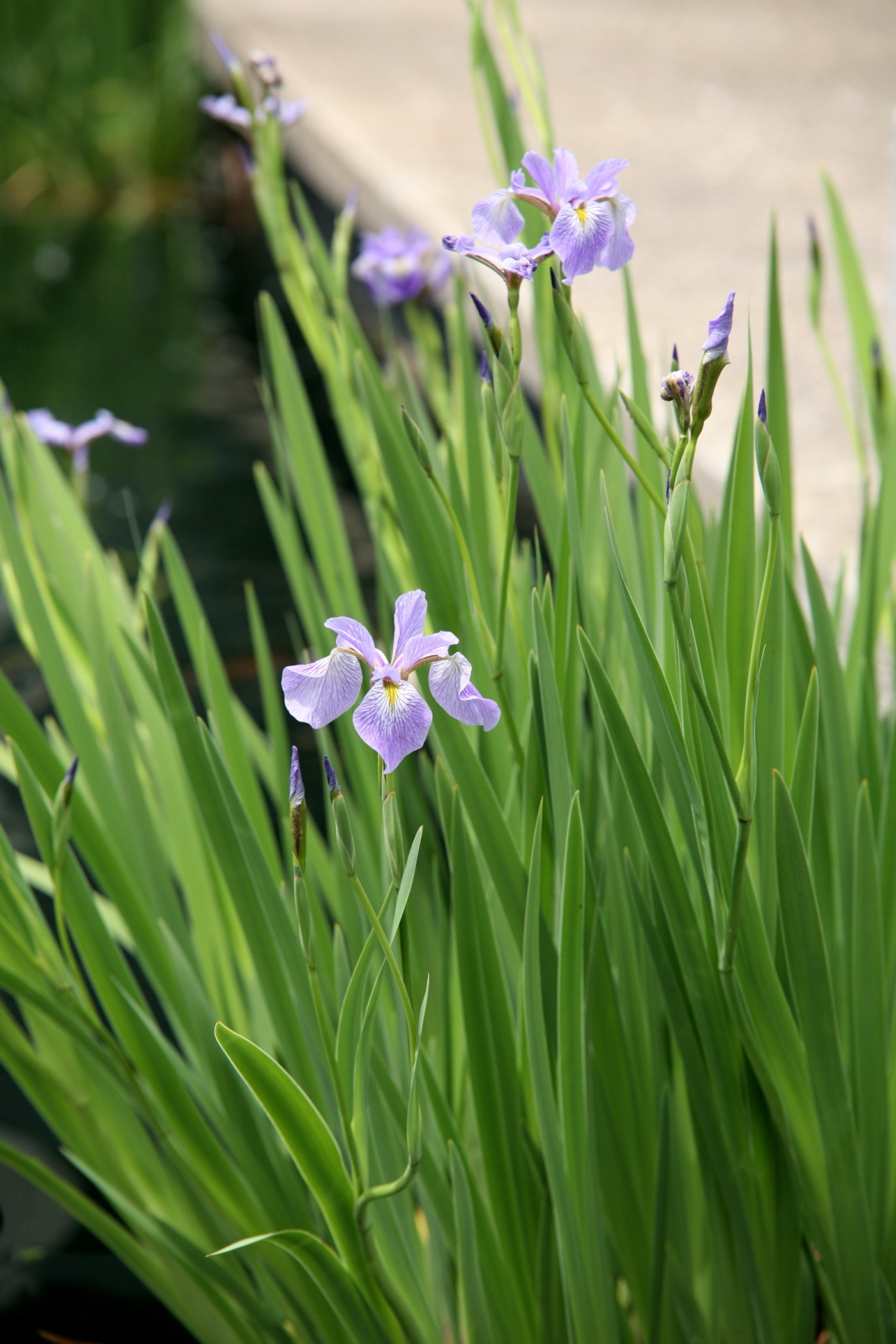
Iris versicolor 'Blue Flag'

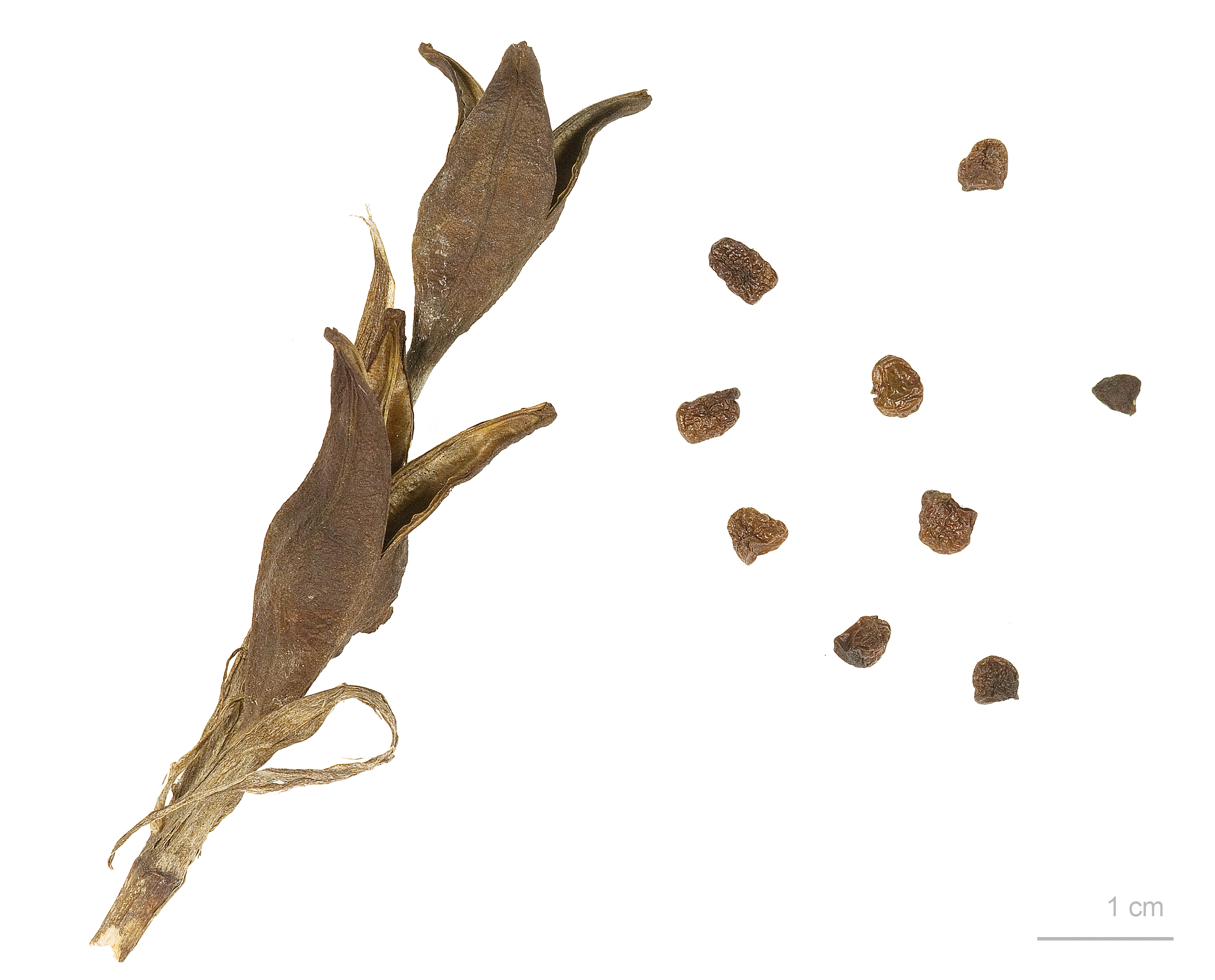
Iris versicolor

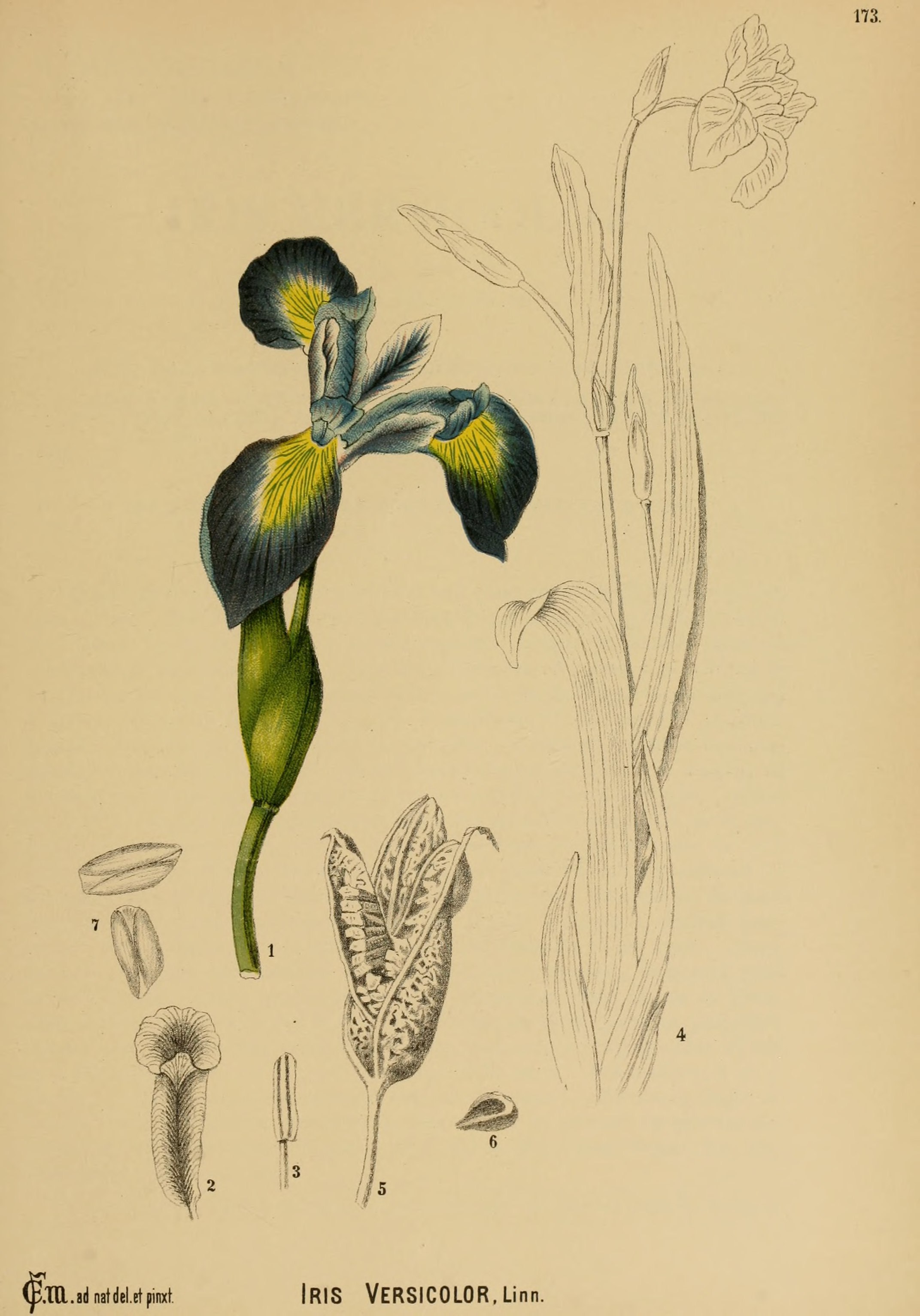
Iris versicolor – botanical illustration in American Medicinal Plants, 1887

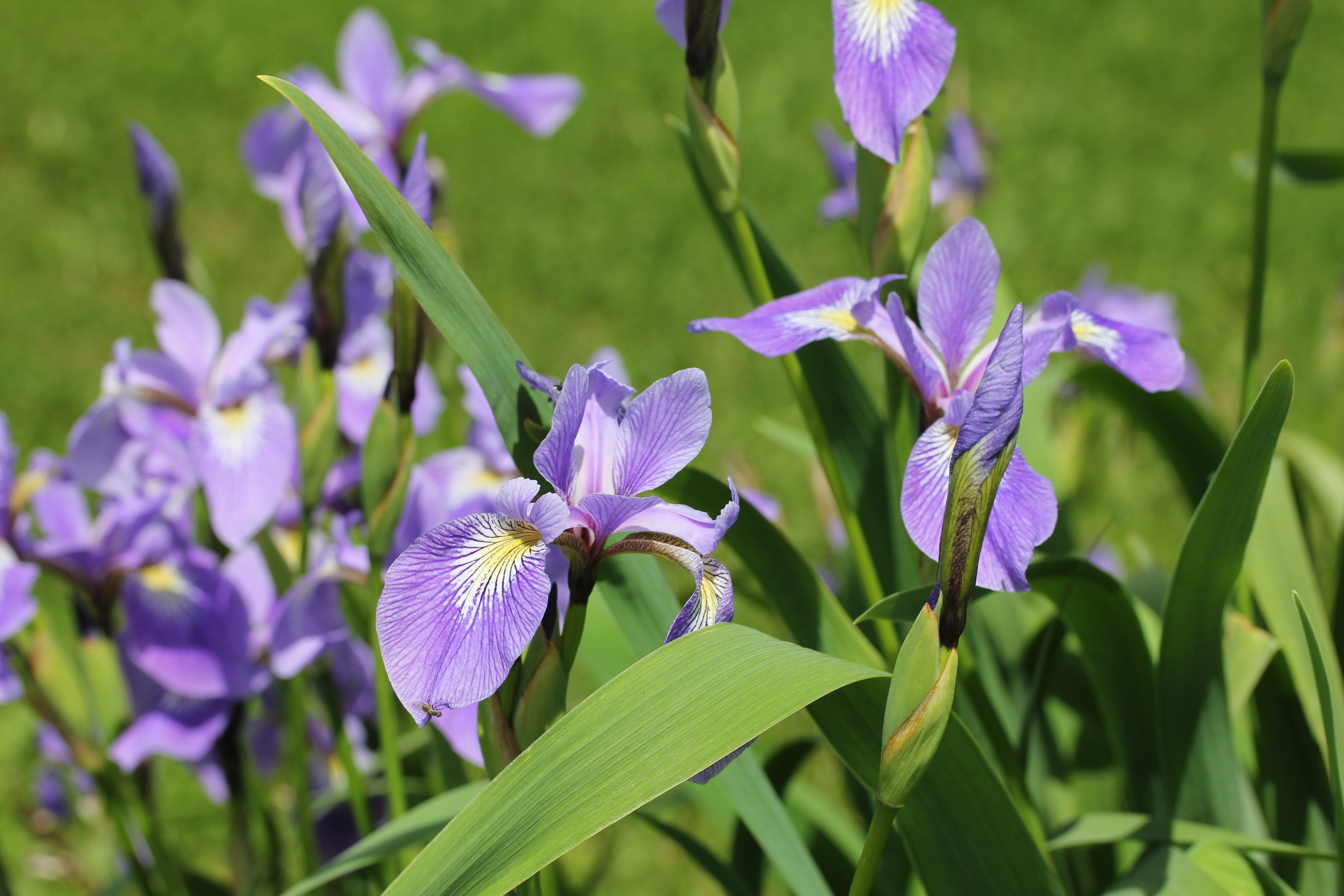
Saint-Prosper-de-Champlain, Quebec, Canada

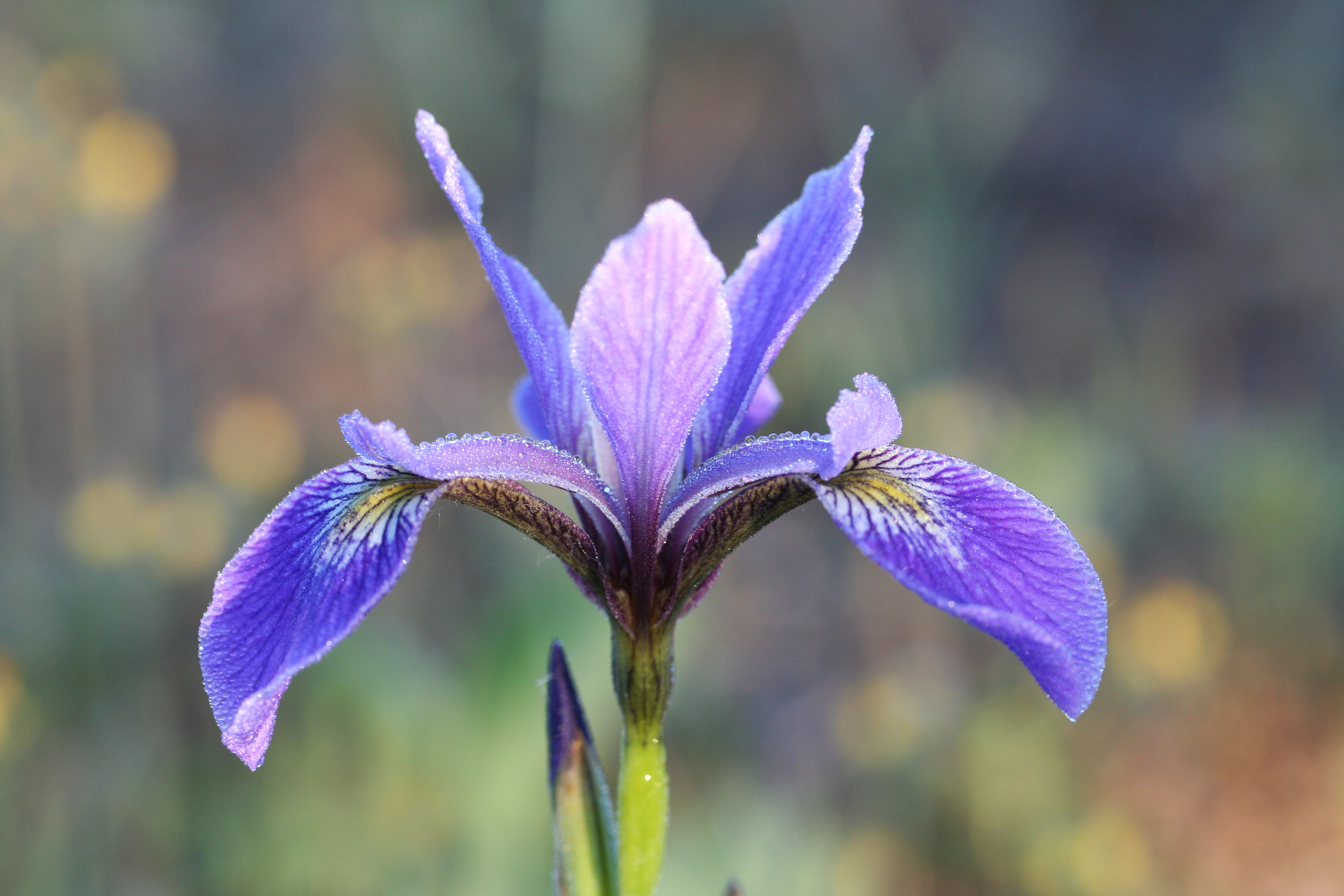
Batiscan, Quebec floral emblem, Canada
