= Willard Cutting Flagg =

American politician

Willard Cutting Flagg (16 September 1829 – 30 March 1878) was an American politician.

Flagg, the only son of Gershom and Jane (Paddock) Flagg, was born in Moro, Madison County, Illinois, September 16, 1829.

He graduated from Yale College in 1854. After leaving college he returned home, and owing to the failing health of his father took charge of his extensive farm. He was married, February 13, 1856, to Sarah of St. Louis, Mo., daughter of James and Betsey (Brown) Smith Proctorsville, Vt., and continued to reside on his farm near Moro until his death. He took an active part in local politics in the campaigns of 1856 and 1860, and in 1862 was appointed collector of internal revenue for the 12th district of Illinois, retaining the office until elected to the Illinois State Senate, a position which he held for four years from 1869.

He was greatly interested in the promotion of scientific agriculture and horticulture, and held a leading position in connection with many organizations for this object. He was also a frequent and successful writer on political and agricultural topics. He was one of the originators of the farmers' movement in the West, and was elected in 1873 the first president of the Illinois State Farmers' Association. He was one of the earliest promoters and trustees of the Illinois Industrial University. He died in Moro, March 30, 1878, of influenza, having been in feeble health through the previous winter.

His wife with three of their six children survived him. His son Norman G. Flagg also served in the Illinois General Assembly.

This article incorporates public domain material from the Yale Obituary Record.
