= Magnus =

Male given name, cognomen, and family name

Magnus, meaning "great" in Latin, was used as cognomen in ancient Rome and a given name in the Middle Ages.

== People ==
=== Ancient Romans ===
- Pompey Magnus, Roman consul and general who was given the honorific "Magnus"
- Magnus Maximus, Roman usurper and Western Roman Emperor (died 388)
- Montius Magnus, 4th-century Roman quaestor

=== Given name ===
==== Kings of Norway ====
- Magnus I of Norway (1024–1047)
- Magnus II of Norway (1048–1069)
- Magnus III of Norway (1073–1103)
- Magnus IV of Norway (c. 1115–1139)
- Magnus V of Norway (1156–1184)
- Magnus VI of Norway (1238–1280)
- Magnus VII of Norway, also known as Magnus Eriksson (1316–1374)

==== Kings of Sweden ====
- Magnus the Strong (c. 1106–1134)
- Magnus Henriksson (died 1161)
- Magnus Ladulås (1240–1290)
- Magnus Eriksson (1316–1374), also Magnus VII of Norway

==== Other kings ====
- Géza I (1074–1077), also known by his baptismal name Magnus
- Magnus the Good (1042–1047), also Magnus I of Norway
- Magnus, Duke of Holstein (1540–1583), titular King of Livonia from 1570 to 1578
- Magnús Óláfsson (died 1265), King of Mann and the Isles

==== Dukes ====
- Magnus, Duke of Saxony (c. 1045–1106)
- Magnus I, Duke of Brunswick-Lüneburg (before 1318–1369)
- Magnus II, Duke of Brunswick-Lüneburg (1324–1373), also known as Magnus with the Necklace
- Magnus I, Duke of Saxe-Lauenburg (1488–1543)

==== Saints ====
- Albert Magnus (c.1200–1280), German bishop, philosopher, theologian and scientist
- Magnus (bishop of Milan), bishop of Milan from 518 to c.530
- Magnus Erlendsson, Earl of Orkney, Earl of Orkney 1106–c.1117)
- Magnus of Anagni (2nd century)
- Magnus of Avignon (died 660), bishop and governor of Avignon
- Magnus of Cuneo (3rd century)
- Magnus of Füssen, missionary saint of southern Germany, seventh or eighth century

=== Family name ===
- Magnus family, British Jewish
  - Magnus baronets
    - Philip Magnus, 1st Baronet
    - Philip Magnus (historian), 2nd Baronet (1906–1988), British historian
    - Laurie Magnus (executive), 3rd Baronet (born 1955), British executive, appointed UK Prime Minister's Independent Adviser on Ministers' Interests in 2022
    - Laurie Magnus (1872–1933), English author, journalist, and publisher
  - Katie Magnus, author and communal worker, wife of Philip Magnus, 1st Baronet
  - Leonard Arthur Magnus, scholar and translator, son of Philip Magnus, 1st Baronet
- Ailsa Magnus (born 1967), Scottish sculptor
- Désiré Magnus, Belgian pianist
- Elisabeth von Magnus, Austrian singer
- Finn Magnus, Danish-American founder of Magnus Harmonica Corporation
- Gilles Magnus (born 1999), Belgian racing driver
- Heinrich Gustav Magnus, German chemist and physicist who discovered the Magnus effect
- Jens Christian Magnus (1920–2017), Norwegian military officer and politician
- Kurt Magnus (1912–2003), German scientist, expert in the field of applied mechanics, a pioneer of mechatronics
- Kurt Magnus (radio personality) (1887–1962), German lawyer and politician, a pioneer of German radio broadcasting
- Ludwig Immanuel Magnus, German mathematician
- Paul Wilhelm Magnus, German botanist
- Siobhan Magnus, American singer
- Thomas Magnus (d. 1550), English churchman and diplomat
- Wilhelm Magnus, German mathematician
- Rolf Magnus Joakim Larsson, known as Joey Tempest, Swedish musician and the lead vocalist of the rock band Europe

=== Pseudonyms, pen names and ring names ===
- Magnus, pseudonym of American magician Jeff McBride
- Magnus, pen name of Italian comic book artist Roberto Raviola
- Magnus (formerly Brutus Magnus), ring name of English professional wrestler Nick Aldis (born 1986)

== Fictional characters ==
- Magnus Bane, in The Mortal Instruments series by Cassandra Clare, and character in the TV Series Shadowhunters
- Magnus Burnsides, one of the main protagonists in The Adventure Zone Dungeons & Dragons podcast
- Magnus Chase, the main protagonist in the fantasy series Magnus Chase and the Gods of Asgard
- Magnus Eisengrim, in the Deptford Trilogy
- Magnus Gallant, a main character in Ogre Battle 64
- Magnus Greel, a villain in the 1977 Doctor Who serial The Talons of Weng-Chiang
- Magnus Hammersmith, an antagonist in Metalocalypse
- Magnus Murchie, Margaret's insane uncle and advisor in Muriel Spark's Symposium
- Magnus Pym, the protagonist of John le Carré's novel A Perfect Spy
- Magnus Powermouse, the title character of the children's book of the same name
- Magnus, Robot Fighter, a comic book character published by Gold Key and Valiant comics
- Magnus von Grapple, a boss in Paper Mario: The Thousand-Year Door
- Magnus (The Vampire Chronicles), in The Vampire Chronicles by Anne Rice
- Magnus, the real name of the Doctor Who character the Master
- Ultra Magnus, several characters in the Transformers universe
- Magnus Lehnsherr, an alternate reality Marvel Comics character; son of Rogue and Magneto
- Magnus the Red, Primarch of the Thousand Sons Space Marines in the Warhammer 40,000 universe
- Magnus the Sorcerer, a Marvel Universe character
- Magnus, in the video game Kid Icarus: Uprising
- Magnus Fossbakken, in the Norwegian TV show Skam
- Magnus Nielsen, a character from the TV series Dark
- Magnus the Rogue, a supporting character in the video game Minecraft Story Mode
- Magnus, the mascot of the Cleveland State Vikings
- Magnus, the god of magic from The Elder Scrolls universe
- Will Magnus, a DC Comics scientist
- Count Magnus, title character in the M.R. James story
- Jonah Magnus, founder of the titular institute in the horror fiction podcast The Magnus Archives
- Magnus au Grimmus, a character in the Red Rising series
- Ultra Magnus, a supporting character in Transformers: Animated, in which "magnus" is a high rank amongst Autobots; he also appears in Transformers: Prime
- Magnus Honey, Miss Honey's dad in Matilda (novel)
- Fidelio Magnus and Basilio Magnus, two paripus brothers from Metaphor: ReFantazio

== See also ==
- Magnes (disambiguation)
- Magnusson (disambiguation)
- List of people known as The Great
