= League of British Jews =

Anglo-Jewish anti-Zionist organization

The League of British Jews was an Anglo-Jewish anti-Zionist organization which opposed the Balfour Declaration giving British support for the establishment of a Jewish homeland in Palestine.

== History ==
The League was founded in November 1917 by a group of prominent British Jews, including Lionel Nathan de Rothschild, Sir Philip Magnus and Louis Montagu, 2nd Baron Swaythling. Its first president was Rothschild, with Montagu and Magnus serving as vice presidents. The League had a small membership, only 18 in 1917, who were "recruited from the highly acculturated upper strata of British Jewry". Despite its small numbers, the League was highly influential. The League favored settlement in Palestine by British Jews who chose to live there, but opposed the belief that Jews constituted a separate nationality, the position then held by Reform Judaism. At the time it was founded, the objectives of the League were listed as upholding "the status of British Jews holding the Jewish religion", resisting "the allegation that Jews constitute a separate nationality", and facilitating "the settlement in Palestine of such Jews as may desire to make Palestine their home". Membership was available to all at a cost of one shilling per year.

The league held its first general meeting at Wigmore Hall on 14 March 1918. An advert of the meeting published in The Times the day before stated:

While supporting the Government’s policy of encouraging the colonization of Palestine by Jews, the league desires to uphold the existing civil and political status of British subjects professing the Jewish religion, and to resist the allegation that Jews constitute a separate political nation. It is, in short, a protest against the so-called “ Jewish International.” The League has received strong support throughout the Anglo-Jewish community, and all the leading names in Anglo-Jewry are represented on its provisional committee.

At the meeting, according to reporting by The Times, Rothschild was quoted as saying that "the conquest of Palestine made the territory free for any one to enter irrespective of race and creed. They ought not to have a specific Jewish Government." At the same time, Baron Swaythling rejected the notion of "Jewish people" as a distinct people in the Balfour Declaration, which he said undermined the struggle for equality for Jewish people in European nations such as Russia, Germany, and Austria.

The views of the League were reflected in a newspaper founded in October 1919, the Jewish Guardian, edited by Laurie Magnus, which continued to 1931. Its aim was to provide an alternative to the pro-Zionist Jewish Chronicle and Jewish World.

The League of British Jews folded in 1929.

== Notable members ==
Founding members of the group included 1917 and 1918 included the following:

- Lionel de Rothschild, founding president of the league
- Louis Montagu, 2nd Baron Swaythling, vice-president
- Sir Philip Magnus, vice-president
- Sir Charles S. Henry, treasurer
- Israel Abrahams
- David Lindo Alexander
- Israel Gollanz
- Laurie Magnus
- Lily Montagu
- Claude Goldsmid Montefiore
- Sir Matthew Nathan
- Sir Isidore Spielmann
- Sir Edward D. Stern
- Lucien Wolf

Others who went on to join the League included:

- Marcus Samuel, 1st Viscount Bearsted

== See also ==
- American Council for Judaism
- Balfour Declaration
- Zionism
