= Isidore Spielmann =

British art critic and civil engineer (1854–1925)

Sir Isidore Spielmann, CMG FSA (London 21 July 1854 – 10 May 1925) was a British civil engineer turned art connoisseur, impresario and exhibition organizer.

== Early life ==
Isidore Spielmann was born into a Jewish family in London in 1854, the son of the banker Adam Spielmann (1812–1869), one of three brothers who had emigrated from Schokken (now Skoki), near Posen (now Poznań, following the Partitions of Poland. Isidore had seven siblings, several of whom died in infancy or in young adulthood, but the two surviving brothers were equally celebrated figures: Sir Meyer Spielmann (1856–1936) was primarily concerned with education and youth-rehabilitation and was knighted in 1928, but he was also an art collector himself; Marion Spielmann (1858–1948) was the youngest and received no honours, but was a renowned art critic in his time and arguably the most influential of the three in the art world of the Edwardian era. Isidore's nephews and nieces included the women's suffrage campaigner Eva Hubback.

Isidore's own career was in civil engineering and he was awarded the CMG, before he began his second career.

== Art Impresario ==
Spielman compiled the book, Royal Commission : St. Louis International Exhibition, 1904, an account of the British exhibition at the St. Louis World's Fair, which he took part in organizing. The book was published by the Royal Commission in 1906.

Sir Isidore Spielmann was awarded a knighthood on 24 July 1905. Spielmann was Britain's Commissioner for Art for the 1908 Franco-British Exhibition.

== Family life ==
Spielmann married Emily Sebag-Montefiore and they had five children. Lady Spielmann's last address was 56 Westbourne Terrace, London, W2.

The younger of the two sons, Harold Spielmann, was killed at Gallipoli in 1915, as a 23-year old Captain in 10th Bn., the Manchester Regiment. The eldest daughter, Dora Marian Spielmann married Laurie Magnus, heir to the Magnus baronetcy, but he narrowly predeceased his father and it was their sons who continued that line; two of the daughters married a distant cousin from the Sebag-Montefiores, further bonding 'the Cousinhood'. The youngest daughter, Adelaide (1895–1961), married Lionel Cohen, Lord Cohen, the distinguished Law Lord from another well-known banking dynasty. He died at his home at 56 Westbourne Terrace, London, W2 on 10 May 1925.
