= Labour Together scandal =

British political controversy

- Date: 2021–2026
- Location: United Kingdom
- Outcome: £14,250 Electoral Commission fine (2021); resignation of Josh Simons as a Cabinet Office minister (2026)

The Labour Together scandal is a British political controversy involving the Labour-aligned think tank Labour Together, its failure to report donations on time, and its later use of APCO Worldwide to examine journalists who had reported on the donations.

The Electoral Commission fined Labour Together £14,250 in 2021 after finding that it had failed to report about £730,000 of donations received between 2017 and 2020. The issue returned to public attention in September 2025, when the Conservative Party referred Keir Starmer to the parliamentary standards commissioner over support given to his 2020 Labour leadership campaign; the Electoral Commission declined to open a new inquiry on 26 September 2025.

In February 2026 it was reported that Labour Together, then run by Josh Simons, had paid APCO £36,000 in 2023 to investigate the journalists who had reported on the donations. The Sunday Times reported that APCO's report, codenamed "Operation Cannon", discussed the journalists' personal backgrounds and, it said, advanced claims about possible Russian links that were not backed by evidence. A version of the report was sent to the National Cyber Security Centre (NCSC), part of GCHQ.

After the disclosures, the Cabinet Office began a review and the Public Relations and Communications Association opened an inquiry into APCO; the matter was also raised in Parliament. Simons resigned as a Cabinet Office minister in February 2026. In May 2026 he announced that he would also stand down as MP for Makerfield, saying the decision would allow Andy Burnham to seek a Commons seat.

In April 2026 the Financial Times reported that it had obtained recordings of an APCO executive discussing deleting material after a warning to preserve documents. APCO said it had acted promptly to preserve documents and denied any intention to destroy records in breach of a legal hold. In June 2026 the Democracy for Sale journalists Peter Geoghegan and Khadija Sharife won the Paul Foot Award for their reporting on the story.

== Background ==
=== Labour Together ===
Labour Together was incorporated on 9 June 2015 as Common Good Labour Limited and became Labour Together Limited on 1 September 2015. The former Labour MP Jon Cruddas was among its founders. The Sunday Times described the group as having helped Keir Starmer win the Labour leadership in 2020. Morgan McSweeney was a director of Labour Together from 2017 to 2020 and later became Starmer's chief of staff, a post he left in February 2026. Josh Simons later led the organisation before his election as MP for Makerfield at the 2024 general election; it was afterwards renamed ThinkLabour.

=== Electoral Commission fine ===
In December 2017 the Electoral Commission determined that Labour Together was a "members association" and so subject to the rules on reporting political donations. It later found that the organisation had committed 20 breaches of campaign-finance law by failing to declare donations on time, and in 2021 it fined Labour Together £14,250. The undeclared donations totalled about £730,000 and related to money received between 2017 and 2020. Reported donors during the period included the financier Martin Taylor, founder of the fund Nevsky Capital, and the businessman Sir Trevor Chinn. Steve Reed and Lisa Nandy were directors of Labour Together for part of the period in which donations went unreported; The Sunday Times reported that there was no suggestion that either was responsible for compliance with electoral law.

== Donations reporting and 2025 referral ==
In November 2023 the Sunday Times journalists Gabriel Pogrund and Harry Yorke reported on Labour Together's undeclared donations and McSweeney's role at the organisation. In February 2024 The Daily Telegraph reported that senior Labour figures had wanted Chinn, a Jewish donor, to keep a "low profile" because of concern about antisemitism in the party. Chinn told the paper that the failure to declare the donations was a "mistake".

The Conservative Party revived the issue in September 2025, publishing 2021 correspondence in which a Labour lawyer had advised McSweeney that, if his account did not hold up, he could attribute the failure to an "administrative error". The Conservative chairman, Kevin Hollinrake, referred Starmer to the Parliamentary Commissioner for Standards, arguing that in-kind support from Labour Together to Starmer's 2020 leadership campaign should have been declared, and asked the Electoral Commission and the police to look again. Labour denied wrongdoing, saying McSweeney's salary during the campaign had been paid by the campaign rather than by Labour Together, and that the campaign had received no donations from the think tank. On 26 September 2025 the Electoral Commission said it would not open a new inquiry, having "thoroughly reviewed this information and found no evidence of any other potential offences" and no evidence that McSweeney had been involved in any potential offences.

== APCO Worldwide report ==
=== Commissioning ===
After the November 2023 Sunday Times article, Simons commissioned APCO Worldwide to examine the "backgrounds and motivations" of the reporters involved, for which APCO was paid £36,000. The firm produced a 58-page report dated January 2024, marked "private and confidential" and codenamed "Operation Cannon". It was written by Tom Harper, an APCO senior director who had previously worked at The Sunday Times; Harper wrote that he had examined the "sourcing, funding and origins" of the story using documents and "discreet human source enquiries". Democracy for Sale and The Sunday Times reported that McSweeney knew of the decision to hire APCO, met Harper and was briefed on the work.

=== Contents of the report ===
According to The Sunday Times, the report named Pogrund and Yorke as "persons of significant interest" and devoted about ten pages to Pogrund. The paper said the report discussed Pogrund's background, Jewish faith and personal life, and quoted an unnamed source who questioned the consistency of his views. The report said his reporting on other subjects, including the royal family, "could be seen as destabilising to the UK and also in the interests of Russia's strategic foreign policy objectives". Harper also suggested that the emails used in the donations story might have come from a suspected Russian hack of the Electoral Commission, writing that "the likeliest culprit is the Russian state, or proxies of the Russian state". The Sunday Times reported that APCO had given no evidence for that claim and noted that APCO was not a cybersecurity firm; Pogrund had himself been sanctioned by Russia and banned from travelling there. The report also covered the investigative journalist Paul Holden, who had supplied material to The Sunday Times and had written The Fraud: Keir Starmer, Morgan McSweeney and the Crisis of British Democracy, and the American writer Matt Taibbi, who had collaborated with Holden. A version of the report was shared informally with Labour figures in 2024, including serving ministers and special advisers. Simons later said that the material on Pogrund had been included without his approval and that he had it removed before the report reached GCHQ.

=== Referral to the National Cyber Security Centre ===
A shorter version of the report, without the personal section on Pogrund, was sent to the NCSC, part of GCHQ, which declined to open a full investigation. The Guardian reported that the version sent to GCHQ still named Pogrund and Yorke and connected them to pro-Russian propaganda claims; the government said the claims in the report were "untrue". Ciaran Martin, who led the NCSC until 2020, said that anyone who publicly claimed to have been hacked but offered no supporting evidence "should expect the media and others to call out the lack of supporting evidence". In February 2026 The Sunday Times reported that Harper had also tried to investigate Henry Dyer, a Guardian investigations correspondent who had followed up the story, suggesting that Dyer had pro-Russian sympathies and was being "used" by Pogrund; the paper said there was no basis for this.

== Dispute over Simons's account ==
On 11 February 2026 Simons said he had hired APCO to investigate "a suspected illegal hack" of Labour Together information, and that he had not intended the work to scrutinise journalists. He said he was "surprised" and "shocked" that the report included "unnecessary information on Gabriel Pogrund", which he said he had removed before it was passed to GCHQ. In his resignation letter he said he "did not know" that Yorke and Dyer had been named and that he had taken "immediate action" once he saw the material about Pogrund.

In June 2026 the investigative newsletter Democracy for Sale reported that it had obtained a letter sent to Simons on 2 March 2026 by APCO's solicitors, Withers LLP. In it, APCO disputed his account as "wrong in numerous important respects" and said his version of events had "evolved" in ways that were "inconsistent with the facts". APCO's solicitors said that Simons had not complained about the report at the time, but had emailed Harper to call it "incredibly useful" and had asked to keep working with the firm. They said he had told Labour Together's staff to pay APCO's invoice promptly, and that the description of journalists as "persons of interest" had come from an early internal draft rather than the report delivered to Simons. Simons did not respond to the newsletter's questions.

APCO said publicly that it was "deeply committed to upholding our values and standards as an organisation" and that it was carrying out "a detailed internal review of the project". Labour Together, by then led by Alison Phillips and later rebranded ThinkLabour, said it was ready to support the PRCA's review and described its work with APCO as "indefensible".

== Alleged destruction of records ==
On 28 April 2026 the Financial Times reported that it had obtained audio recordings of Harper. In one, recorded on 13 February 2026 after APCO had received a notice from News UK to preserve documents, Harper was heard telling a contractor to "basically get rid of everything, anything you need to now". The paper said that in another recording he described sending the report to Labour Together through an encrypted Proton Mail account opened in a false name to "muddy the waters" of the "audit trail", and asking whether deleting the account could be detected by "digital forensics". APCO's lawyers told the Financial Times that the firm had "acted promptly to preserve documents" and had no knowledge of any intention to destroy records, and that Harper denied ever instructing the contractor to destroy material in breach of the legal hold; Harper did not respond to requests for comment.

On 23 April 2026 the former shadow chancellor John McDonnell tabled an early day motion, signed by MPs from several parties, on legal protections for whistleblowers under the Public Interest Disclosure Act 1998. The motion stated that a contractor had been instructed by a senior APCO employee to destroy material relating to the firm's work for Labour Together "notwithstanding that the material was subject to a legal hold", had made a protected disclosure to the Serious Fraud Office, and was "subject to proceedings at the London Court of International Arbitration brought by APCO Worldwide through its solicitors Withers LLP". APCO said the arbitration had begun before any whistleblowing disclosure and that the motion was misleading. Harper left APCO in May 2026, and his profile was removed from the firm's website.

== Resignation and inquiries ==
On 15 February 2026 The Sunday Times reported that Labour Together had paid APCO to investigate journalists, building on earlier reporting by Democracy for Sale. Starmer said there would be "a Cabinet Office investigation into the allegations, and quite right too", asked officials to establish the facts, and then referred Simons, who was Parliamentary Under-Secretary of State jointly at the Department for Science, Innovation and Technology and the Cabinet Office, to the independent adviser on ministerial standards, Sir Laurie Magnus. The matter was debated in both Houses of Parliament on 23 and 24 February 2026. The National Union of Journalists said the investigation of journalists was an affront to press freedom, and the Public Relations and Communications Association opened an inquiry into APCO.

In a letter dated 27 February 2026, Magnus said he saw "no basis for advising you of any breach of the Ministerial Code", that he was satisfied Simons's statements were "being made in good faith", and that he drew "no conclusions concerning the firm". He recorded that Simons accepted the report's terms of reference had been "wider than he had understood" and that he had "acted too hastily in confirming their appointment without the benefit of legal advice", and he advised Starmer to consider whether Simons retained his confidence given the "distraction and potential reputational damage".

Simons resigned his ministerial posts on 28 February 2026, telling Starmer that "remaining in office has now become a distraction from this government's important work"; he kept his seat in the Commons.

== Later developments ==
On 14 May 2026 Simons announced that he would stand down as MP for Makerfield, saying the move would allow Andy Burnham to seek a Commons seat. The publication of APCO's legal letter in June 2026 prompted renewed calls from opposition MPs for an investigation into Simons's conduct.

== Reporting and recognition ==
Democracy for Sale, a newsletter founded by Peter Geoghegan, first reported that Labour Together had paid APCO to investigate journalists; the story was then taken up by The Sunday Times, the Financial Times, The Guardian and the BBC. On 10 June 2026 Geoghegan and Khadija Sharife won the 2026 Paul Foot Award for investigative and campaigning journalism for the work, titled "How Labour Together hired a PR firm to target journalists". The award, organised by Private Eye and worth £8,000, said the investigation had "led to the resignation of former Labour Together chief Josh Simons from his post as parliamentary secretary in the Cabinet Office".

== See also ==
- Political funding in the United Kingdom
- Freedom of the press in the United Kingdom
- Lobbying in the United Kingdom
