= History of the Jews in the Canary Islands =

Canarian Jews
Regions with significant populations
- Tenerife, Gran Canaria, La Palma

Languages
- Spanish, Hebrew, Arabic

Religion
- Judaism

The history of the Jews in the Canary Islands dates to the 15th century, when converted Jews moved to the Canary Islands from the Iberian Peninsula and continued practicing their religion in secrecy. The contemporary Jewish community is small and is mostly composed of Sephardic Jews who migrated to the islands in their mid-twentieth century and their descendants.

== History ==
Spanish and Portuguese Jews began arriving in the Canary Islands in the late 15th century, due to the persecution of the Spanish Inquisition. The first Jewish settlers lived on the islands of Tenerife and La Palma. Only conversos could settle in the islands. Just as Jews in mainland Iberian suffered persecution, Jews in the Canary Islands were also persecuted, although to a lesser extent.

The conversos can be divided to two groups, those who underwent forced conversion in Spain in 1492 and those who underwent forced conversion in Portugal in 1497. Professor Beinart describes the first group as artisans, shopkeepers and merchants.

A significant proportion of immigrants from European countries to the Canary islands were of Jewish or Converso origin.

The role of the Jewish community in Gran Canaria was of great importance, since in the 1520s most of the public positions on the island had this origin. An example of this is the case of Diego de Herrera, governor of the island of Gran Canaria in the 16th century who, along with other converts with high political positions, managed to get Emperor Carlos I to abolish the Inquisition court. However, this suppression appeared little, since in 1526 the Holy See celebrated its first Auto-da-fé on the islands, burning 8 Judaizers to the stake. The Jewish presence was also equally important in Tenerife, with personalities occupying relevant positions such as Diego Alvarado y Bracamonte, of Jewish origin and who was Governor of Tenerife from 1624 to 1631.

During the 15th and 16th centuries they settled mainly on the royal islands, where they were a sparse urban reduction. There was a mixture with the main families of the archipelago, blending in with the local community and diluting their customs. The mother of the 16th century Catholic saint, José de Anchieta, a missionary in Brazil born in San Cristobal de La Laguna, Tenerife, was a descendant of conversos.

During the 17th century and after the union of Castile and Portugal, Portuguese converts (Marrano) began to arrive on the islands, mainly dedicated to trade and the administration of royal income, having full control of the administration from 1640 until the end of the century.

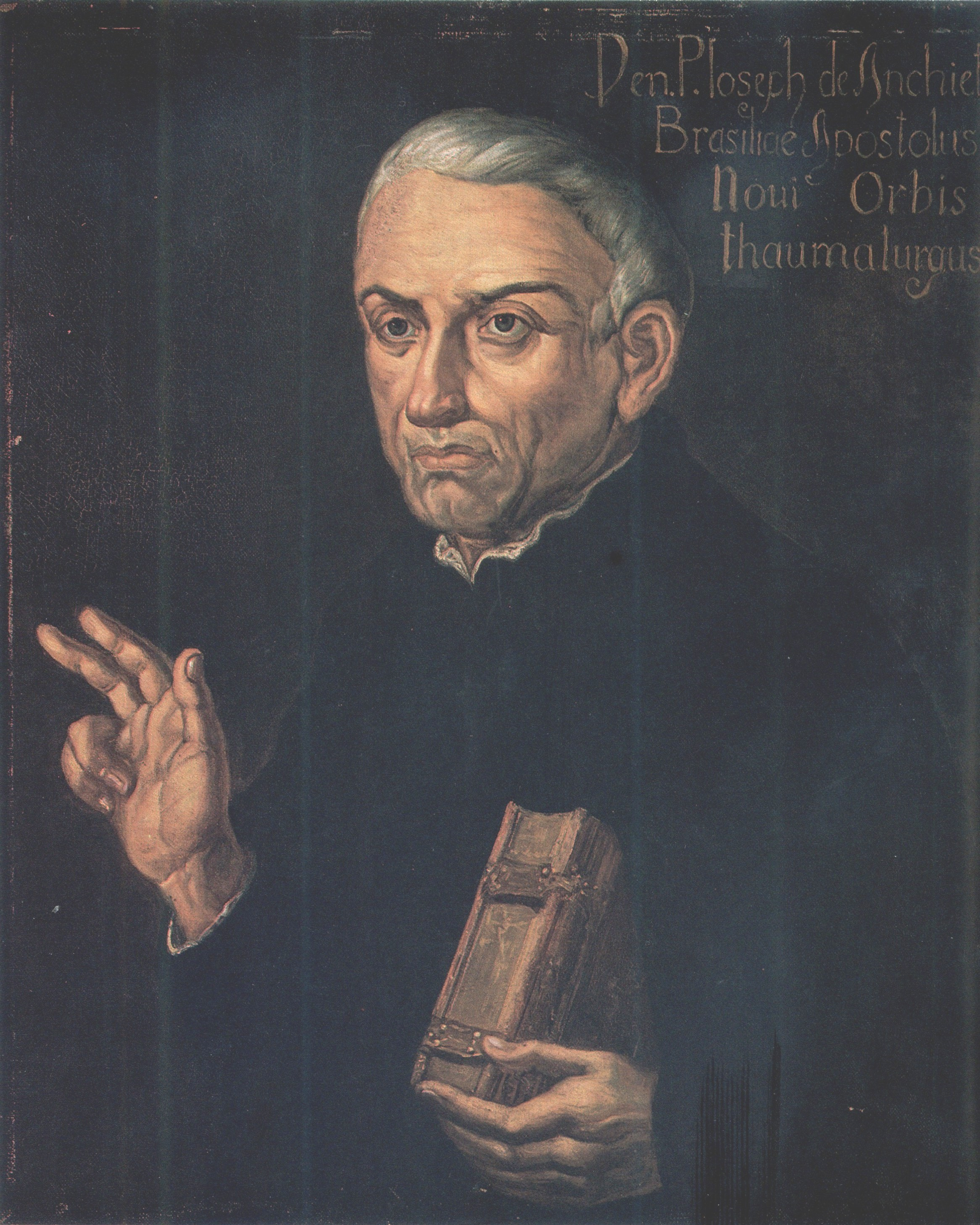
Saint Joseph of Anchieta (1534–1597), Canarian Jesuit missionary to Brazil and one of the founders of São Paulo and Rio de Janeiro. José de Anchieta was a descendant of Jewish converts through the maternal line.

The existence of cryptic groups on the three royal islands (Gran Canaria, La Palma and Tenerife) is known to meet first thing in the morning or at night in the house of those considered chiefs, who were sometimes rabbis who had adapted to the insular reality. With the creation of the court these groups will disappear, some will flee and others will adapt to the new situation.

After a series of calamities that affected the Canary Islands between 1523 and 1532, the local delegation of the Inquisition promulgated some edicts that included the religious and social customs of the Jewish and Muslim converts. This made it easier for the population to identify non-Christian rites, making it possible for the number of informers to increase. Added to all this, skippers, owners and ship captains were prohibited from giving passage to converts of any kind or to new Christians, under pain of confiscation of their property, their boats and their excommunication. This isolated the Jewish community on the islands, who saw their options limited to the archipelago. The complaints increased considerably between 1524 and 1526 thanks to these measures, leading to the burning of 8 people, 6 of them Jewish: Álvaro Gonçales, his wife Mencia Vaes, their son Silvestre Gonçales, Maestre Diego de Valera, Pedro Gonçales and Alonso Yanes.

The Jews who were discovered were charged with the crime of heresy and apostasy, specifically the crime of Judaism. Those crimes were both for actions and omissions. The actions were the continuity of the Jewish rites and customs, being that of the Sabbath the most denounced and practiced of all of them. There were also cases of keeping the Yom Kippur, Passover, praying raising and lowering the head, and refraining from eating meat pig. Few cases were of using the Hebrew language and writing, although among them they did use the language.

== Currently ==
The contemporary Sephardi Jewish community is small, but organized. There is a synagogue located in Las Palmas on the island of Gran Canaria, and there was another synagogue in Tenerife until 1989. Most Sephardi Jews in the Canary Islands came from Morocco and other North African countries, moving there for economic reasons during the 1960s at the end of the era of French and Italian colonial rule.

In 2022, Chabad established Chabad of the Canary Islands-Tenerife in the city of Puerto de la Cruz with presence as well in the south of the island, constituting the center of Jewish life in the island. This branch belongs to Hasidic Judaism.

The island of Lanzarote is a popular tourist destination for British Jews.

== See also ==
- Lançados

== Bibliography ==
- Wolf, Lucien (1988). Judíos en las islas Canarias (Calendario de los casos judíos extraídos de los archivos de la Inquisición canaria de la colección del marqués de Bute). J. A. D. L. ISBN 84-87171-00-1.
