= Ernest Graham-Little =

Sir Ernest Gordon Graham Graham-Little (8 February 1867 – 6 October 1950) was a dermatologist and British Member of Parliament for London University from 1924 to 1950.

== Political life ==
Graham-Little was initially elected as an Independent; from 1931 onwards he gave support to the National Government but did not join any of its component parties. Graham-Little was born in Monghyr, Bengal, India, to Michael and Anna (née English) Little. Following the death of his mother when he was four years old, he was raised in South Africa. He was the fifth (and last) MP for the London University seat. His first recorded speech supported the lasting introduction of British Summer Time. Graham-Little made 1,596 written questions, answers or debate contributions as recorded by official records. His last contribution was on the subject of National Health Service doctors' basic salary.

== Bibliography ==
- Leigh Rayment's Historical List of MPs

Parliament of the United Kingdom
Preceded by Sydney Russell-Wells	Member of Parliament for London University; 1924–1950	Constituency abolished
