= Michael Foster (physiologist) =

English physiologist (1836–1907)

Sir Michael Foster KCB FRS VMH
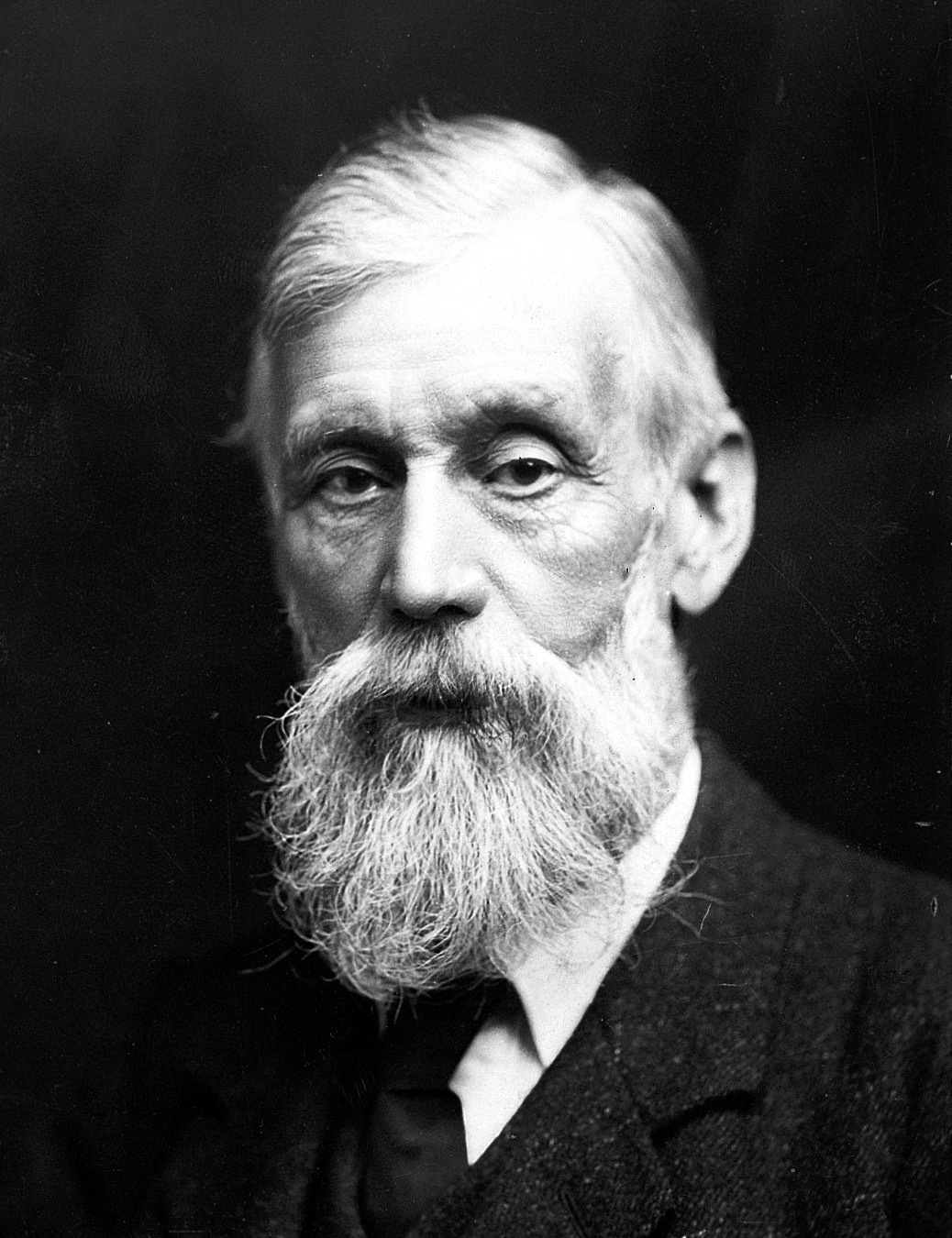
- Born: 8 March 1836; Huntingdon, England
- Died: 29 January 1907 (aged 70); London, England
- Education: University College School
- Known for: Textbook of Physiology (1876)
- Scientific career
- Fields: Physiologist
- Workplaces: University College London; University of Cambridge
- Academic advisors: Thomas Henry Huxley; William Sharpey
- Notable students: John Newport Langley; Charles Scott Sherrington

Sir Michael Foster KCB FRS VMH (8 March 1836 – 29 January 1907) was an English physiologist. He was instrumental in organizing the University of Cambridge Biological School and acted as Secretary of the Royal Society.

== Early life ==
Foster was born in Huntingdon, Huntingdonshire, in March 1836, the son of Michael Foster, FRCS. He was educated at Huntingdon Grammar School, where he played cricket for the first eleven and was described as "a capital cricketer" for his role as wicket-keeper batsman for the University College School, London.

== Career ==
After graduating in medicine in 1859, he began to practise in his native town. In 1867, he returned to London as teacher of practical physiology at University College London, where two years afterwards he became professor. In 1870 he was appointed by Trinity College, Cambridge to its praelectorship in physiology, and thirteen years later he became the first occupant of the newly created chair of physiology in the university, holding it till 1903. One of his most famous students at Cambridge was Charles Scott Sherrington who went on to win the Nobel Prize in 1932.

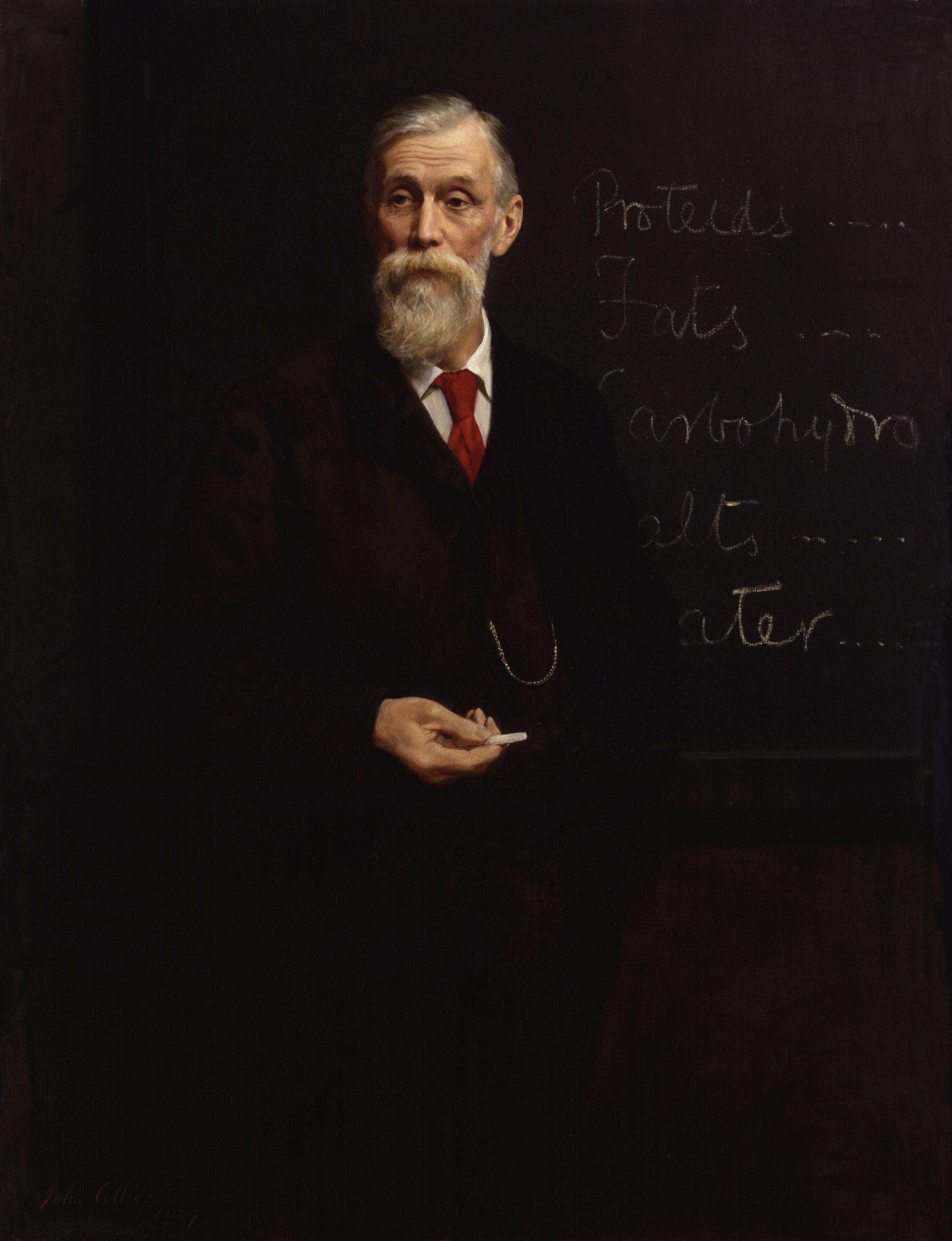
Sir Michael Foster by John Collier

Foster excelled as a teacher and administrator, and had a very large share in the organization and development of the Cambridge biological school. From 1881 to 1903, he was one of the secretaries of the Royal Society, and in that capacity exercised a wide influence on the study of biology in Britain. In the 1899 Birthday Honours, he was created a Knight Commander of the Order of the Bath (KCB), and served as president of the British Association at its meeting at Dover in September 1899.

Foster was elected to represent the University of London in parliament in a by-election in February 1900, and returned unopposed in the 1900 general election held later the same year. He stood for the Liberal Unionist Party, and though returned as a Unionist, his political action was not to be dictated by party considerations, and he gravitated towards Liberalism. He played no prominent part in parliament and indicated a desire to resign in 1902, but stayed on until the next election of 1906, where he stood for re-election but was defeated.

Foster was joint editor with E. Ray Lankester of The Scientific Memoirs of Thomas Henry Huxley. His chief writings were a Textbook of Physiology (1876), which became a standard work, and Lectures on the History of Physiology during the 16th, 17th and 18th Centuries (1901), which consisted of lectures delivered at the Cooper Medical College, San Francisco, in 1900. He was elected as an honorary member of the Manchester Literary and Philosophical Society in 1889 and a member of the American Philosophical Society in 1902.

== Irises ==
Foster was also the binomial author of many iris species. One of many irises he introduced includes Iris lineata Foster ex Regel (or A.Regel), which was originally described and published in Gartenflora (1887), and later cited in Curtis's Botanical Magazine (1888). The species Iris fosteriana was named after Foster by Aitchison, in 1881. The standard author abbreviation Foster is used to indicate this person as the author when citing a botanical name.

The British Iris Society recognised his significant contributions with the introduction of the Foster Memorial Plaque in 1926. This is a medal made of sterling silver, hallmarked by Toye & Co., London, one side cast in bas-relief with an oval portrait of Foster, within a bed of irises, a banner above inscribed 'In Memory Sir Michael Foster 1836-1907'. The other side named the award winner. Early awardees included, in 1927 George Yeld VMH, American John Wister and Frenchman Seraphin Mottet. In 1936 it was given to painter William Caparne. This award has continued into the twenty-first century.

== Personal life ==
Foster married first, in 1864, Georgina Edmonds, daughter of Cyrus Read Edmonds. Following her death in 1869, he married secondly, in 1872, Margaret Rust, daughter of George Rust, JP, of Huntingdon. He lived at Nine Wells House, Great Shelford in the Gog Magog Hills opposite his friend and fellow physiologist W H Gaskell.

He died suddenly in London in 1907.

== Bibliography ==
- Geison, Gerald L. (2015). Michael Foster and the Cambridge school of physiology. Princeton University Press. ISBN 9780691630953.
- Hawgood, Barbara J (2008). "Sir Michael Foster MD FRS (1836–1907): the rise of the British school of physiology". Journal of Medical Biography. 16 (4). England: 221–6. doi:10.1258/jmb.2008.008009. PMID 18952994. S2CID 39205692.

Attribution

Academic offices
Preceded by Thomas Henry Huxley	Fullerian Professor of Physiology; 1869–1872	Succeeded by William Rutherford
Parliament of the United Kingdom
Preceded by Sir John Lubbock	Member of Parliament for London University; 1900–1906	Succeeded by Sir Philip Magnus
