= 1900 London University by-election =

UK Parliamentary by-election

The 1900 London University by-election was a parliamentary by-election held for the UK House of Commons constituency of London University on 6–10 February 1900. It was won by the Liberal Unionist Party candidate Sir Michael Foster.

== Vacancy ==
The by-election was caused by the elevation to the peerage of the sitting Liberal Unionist Party MP Sir John Lubbock. Lubbock had held the seat since 1880, having previously been one of the MPs for the multi-member seat of Maidstone.

== Result ==
Sir Michael Foster won the election with a majority of 15 percent.

By-Election 6–10 February 1900: London University
Party	Candidate	Votes	%	±%
Liberal Unionist	Sir Michael Foster	1,271	46.73	N/A
Liberal	Dr. William Job Collins	863	31.73	N/A
Independent Liberal Unionist	Edward Henry Busk	586	21.54	N/A
Majority		408	15.00	N/A
Turnout		2,720	61.78	N/A
Registered electors		4,403		
Liberal Unionist hold		Swing	N/A	

The election result was formally announced in the theatre of the university on 12 February 1900, following which Foster gave a short speech. He stated that the graduates of the university had for the first time returned a fellow graduate as their member, and told them he would be independent in his opinions even if he supported the present Unionist government.
