= Séraphin Joseph Mottet =

Séraphin Joseph Mottet (1861-1930) was a French horticulturalist, noted for being an expert on irises.

In 1927, Mottet was awarded by The British Iris Society, the Foster Memorial Plaque (named after Michael Foster).
