= 1868 London University by-election =

UK parliamentary by-election

The 1868 London University by-election was held on 21 December 1868. The by-election was held due to the incumbent Liberal MP, Robert Lowe, becoming Chancellor of the Exchequer. It was retained by Lowe who was unopposed.
