= Sydney Russell-Wells =

British politician and physician (1869–1924)

Portrait by Walter Stoneman, 1922

Sir Sydney Russell-Wells, FRCP (25 September 1869 – 14 July 1924) was a British physician and politician. He served as Member of Parliament for London University from 1922 until 1924, as a Unionist.

== Early life ==
He was born in London and attended Dorset County School. He graduated from University College London with a BSc in 1889 and then studied medicine at St George's Hospital.

== Career ==
=== Medicine ===
He was House Surgeon, House Physician and Registrar at St George's Hospital, then based at Hyde Park Corner in central London. He was then physician at the Seaman's Hospital, Greenwich and later at the National Hospital for Diseases of the Heart. He was Vice Chancellor of the University of London from 1919 to 1922.

=== Politics ===
He served as Member of Parliament for London University from 1922 until 1924, sitting as a Unionist.

== Honours ==
In 1921, he was appointed Knight Bachelor (Kt).

== See also ==
- List of Vice-Chancellors of the University of London
- London University (UK Parliament constituency)

Parliament of the United Kingdom
| Preceded by Philip Magnus | Member of Parliament for London University; 1922–1924 | Succeeded by Ernest Graham-Little |
Academic offices
| Preceded by Sir (Edwin) Cooper Perry | Vice-Chancellor of the University of London; 1919–1922 | Succeeded by Sir Holburt Jacob Waring Bt CBE FRCS |
