= London University (constituency) =

Parliamentary constituency in the United Kingdom, 1868–1950

- Former university constituency for the House of Commons

1868–1950
- Seats: 1

London University was a university constituency electing one Member of Parliament (MP) to the House of Commons of the Parliament of the United Kingdom, from 1868 to 1950.

== Boundaries, electorate and history ==
This university constituency was created by the Reform Act 1867. The first election took place during the 1868 United Kingdom general election. The constituency returned one Member of Parliament, using the first past the post electoral system.

The constituency was not a physical area. Its electorate consisted of the graduates of the University of London. Before 1918 only male graduates qualified. From 1918 all graduates qualified, including women over thirty (reduced to twenty one when universal adult suffrage on equal terms was introduced before the 1929 United Kingdom general election).

The constituency was almost abolished in 1918. The original proposal of the Speaker's Conference, which considered electoral reform before the Representation of the People Act 1918 was enacted, was to combine all the English and Welsh universities except for Oxford and Cambridge into a three-member constituency. However, during consideration of the legislation it was agreed that London University should continue to return one member. The University of Wales was also given its own seat. The other universities, which were still to be combined, had their proposed representation reduced to two members.

All the university constituencies were abolished in 1950, by the Representation of the People Act 1948.

== Members of Parliament ==
This is a list of people who have represented this university in the Parliament of the United Kingdom between 1868 and 1950.

Year	Member	Party
1868	Rt Hon. Robert Lowe ^{1}	Liberal
1880	Sir John Lubbock ^{2}	Liberal
1886	Sir John Lubbock ^{2}	Liberal Unionist
1900	Sir Michael Foster	Liberal Unionist
1903	Sir Michael Foster	Liberal
1906	Philip Magnus	Liberal Unionist
1912	Philip Magnus	Unionist
1918	Philip Magnus	Coalition Unionist
1922	Sir Sydney Russell-Wells ^{3}	Unionist
1924	Sir Ernest Graham-Little ^{4}	Independent
1931	Sir Ernest Graham-Little ^{4}	National Independent
1950	Constituency abolished	

Notes:-

- ^{1} Lowe was elevated to the peerage as The 1st Viscount Sherbrooke.
- ^{2} Lubbock was elevated to the peerage as The 1st Baron Avebury.
- ^{3} Russell-Wells died on 14 July 1924 – the seat was vacant at dissolution.
- ^{4} Graham-Little, as an independent MP, supported the National Governments in office from 1931 until the formation of the wartime coalition in 1940. He also supported Winston Churchill's caretaker government in 1945 and his proposed continuation in office if he had won the 1945 election. Graham-Little is therefore classified as a National Independent MP from 1931.

== Elections ==
General elections, from 1918 when most constituencies polled on the same day, were on different polling days from territorial constituencies. The polls for university constituencies were open for five days.

Coalition Conservative is considered to be equivalent to Conservative, as is National Independent equivalent to Independent.

1860s – 1870s – 1880s – 1890s – 1900s – 1910s – 1920s – 1930s – 1940s

=== Elections in the 1860s ===
General election 1868: London University
Party	Candidate	Votes	%	±%
Liberal	Robert Lowe	Unopposed		
Registered electors		1,160		
Liberal win (new seat)				

Lowe was appointed Chancellor of the Exchequer in Gladstone's government.

By-election, 21 December 1868: London University
Party	Candidate	Votes	%	±%
Liberal	Robert Lowe	Unopposed		
Liberal hold				

=== Elections in the 1870s ===
General election 1874: London University
Party	Candidate	Votes	%	±%
Liberal	Robert Lowe	Unopposed		
Registered electors		1,485		
Liberal hold				

=== Elections in the 1880s ===
General election 1880: London University
Party	Candidate	Votes	%	±%
Liberal	Robert Lowe	1,014	65.5	N/A
Conservative	Arthur Charles	535	34.5	New
Majority		479	31.0	N/A
Turnout		1,549	79.6	N/A
Registered electors		1,947		
Liberal hold		Swing	N/A	

Lowe was elevated to the peerage as the 1st Viscount Sherbrooke, causing a by-election.

By-election 3 June 1880: London University
Party	Candidate	Votes	%	±%
Liberal	John Lubbock	Unopposed		
Liberal hold				

General election 1885: London University
Party	Candidate	Votes	%	±%
Liberal	John Lubbock	Unopposed		
Liberal hold				

Lubbock joined the breakaway Liberal Unionist Party in 1886.

General election 1886: London University
Party	Candidate	Votes	%	±%
Liberal Unionist	John Lubbock	1,314	71.8	N/A
Liberal	Frederic Harrison	516	28.2	N/A
Majority		798	43.6	N/A
Turnout		1,830	71.0	N/A
Registered electors		2,579		
Liberal Unionist gain from Liberal		Swing	N/A	

This was a gain for the Liberal Unionist Party, but a hold for Lubbock personally.

=== Elections in the 1890s ===
General election 1892: London University
Party	Candidate	Votes	%	±%
Liberal Unionist	John Lubbock	Unopposed		
Liberal Unionist hold				

General election 1895: London University
Party	Candidate	Votes	%	±%
Liberal Unionist	John Lubbock	Unopposed		
Liberal Unionist hold				

=== Elections in the 1900s ===
Collins

Lubbock was elevated to the peerage as the 1st Baron Avebury, triggering a by-election.

1900 London University by-election
Party	Candidate	Votes	%	±%
Liberal Unionist	Michael Foster	1,271	46.8	N/A
Liberal	William Job Collins	863	31.7	N/A
Independent Liberal Unionist	Edward Henry Busk	586	21.5	N/A
Majority		408	15.1	N/A
Turnout		2,720	61.8	N/A
Registered electors		4,403		
Liberal Unionist hold		Swing	N/A	

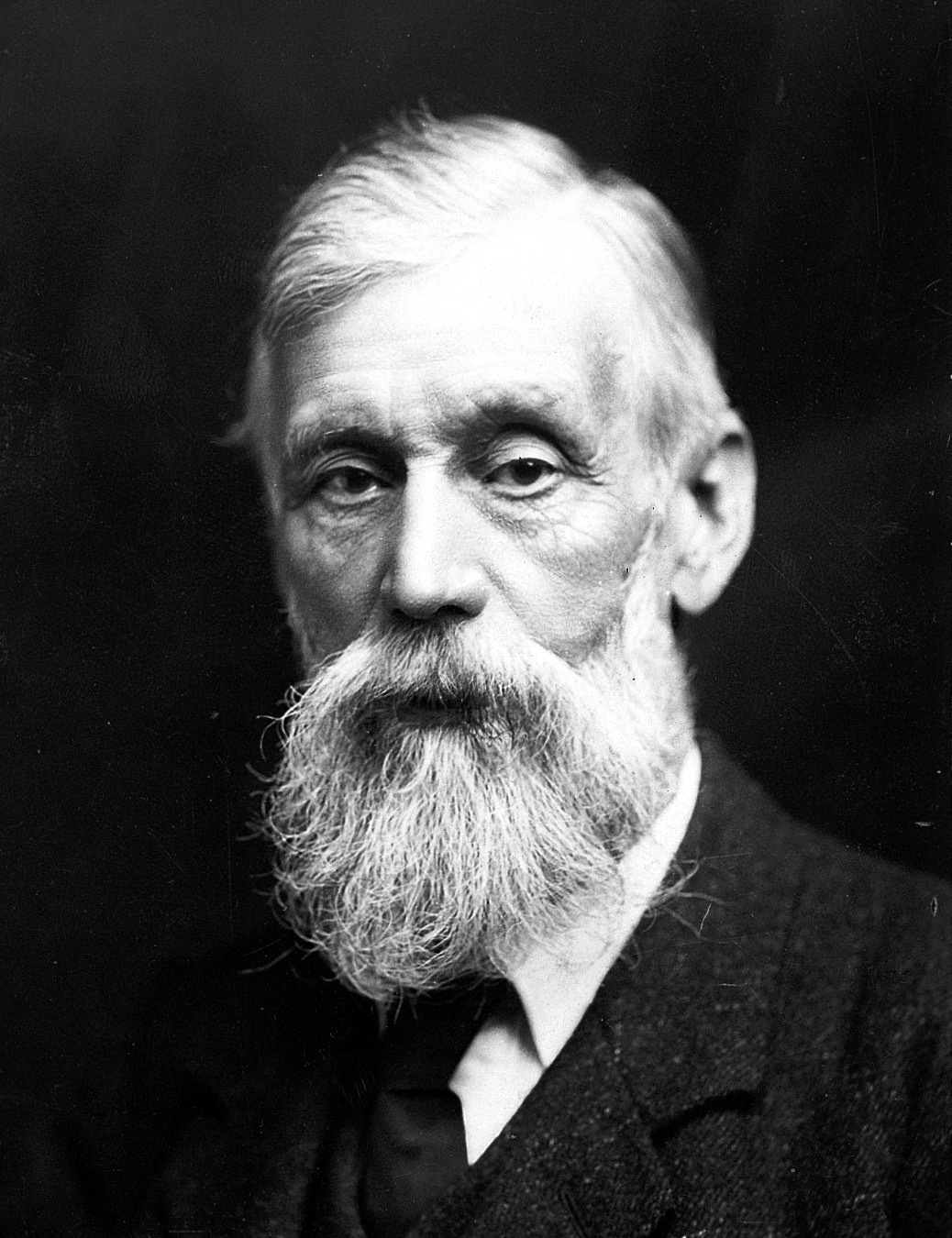
Foster

General election 1900: London University
Party	Candidate	Votes	%	±%
Liberal Unionist	Michael Foster	Unopposed		
Liberal Unionist hold				

General election 1906: London University
Party	Candidate	Votes	%	±%
Liberal Unionist	Philip Magnus	1,840	50.3	N/A
Liberal	Michael Foster	1,816	49.7	N/A
Majority		24	0.6	N/A
Turnout		3,656	70.1	N/A
Registered electors		5,212		
Liberal Unionist hold		Swing	N/A	

=== Elections in the 1910s ===
Ridgeway

General election January 1910: London University
Party	Candidate	Votes	%	±%
Liberal Unionist	Philip Magnus	2,625	57.65	+7.32
Liberal	Joseph West Ridgeway	1,928	42.35	−7.32
Majority		697	15.30	+14.64
Turnout		4,553	75.01	+4.86
Registered electors		6,070		
Liberal Unionist hold		Swing	+7.32	

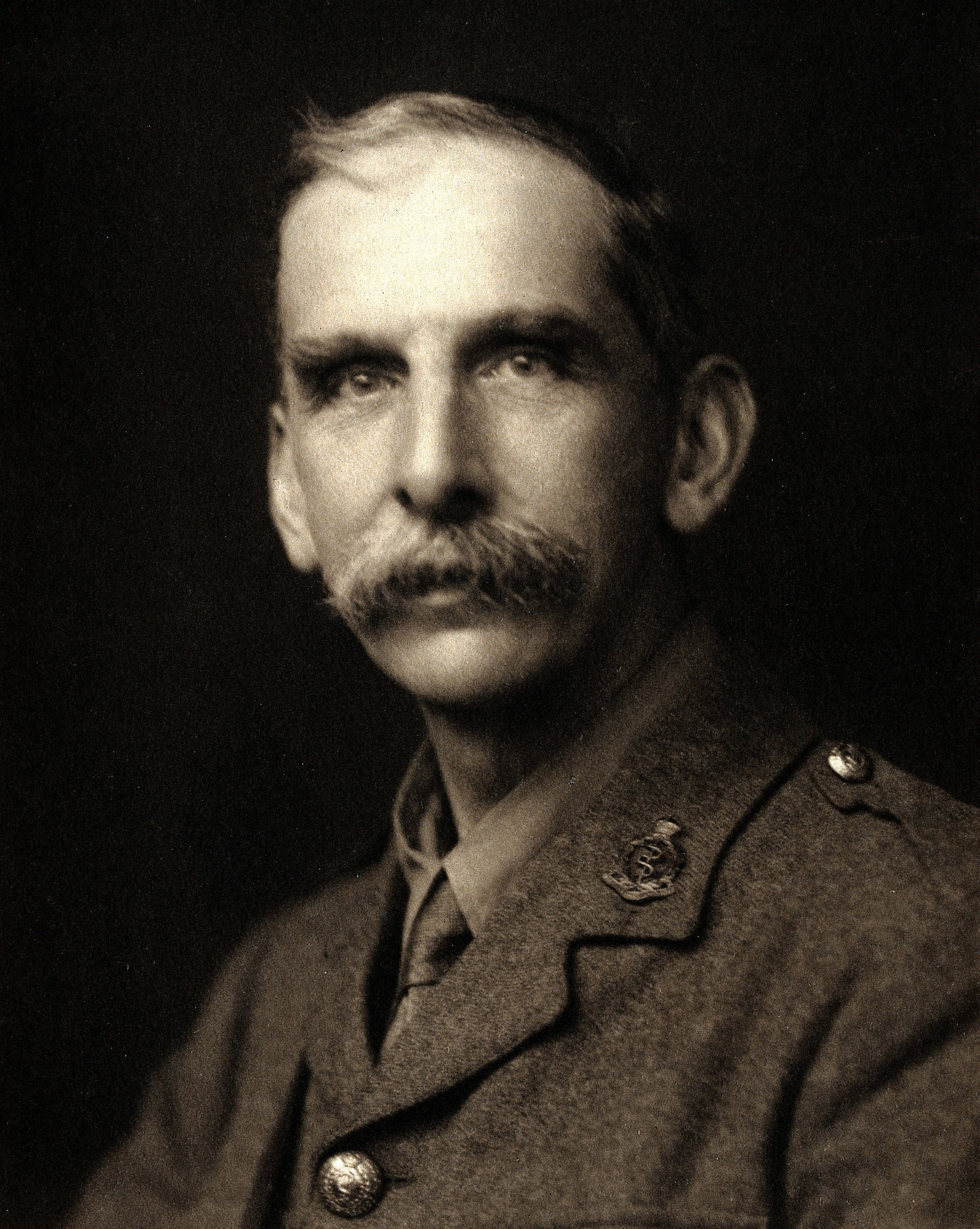
Horsley

General election December 1910: London University
Party	Candidate	Votes	%	±%
Liberal Unionist	Philip Magnus	2,579	58.14	+0.49
Liberal	Victor Horsley	1,857	41.86	−0.49
Majority		722	16.28	+0.98
Turnout		4,436	73.08	−1.93
Registered electors		6,070		
Liberal Unionist hold		Swing	+0.49	

The Liberal Unionist Party merged with the Conservative Party in 1912, but its former members continued to be known collectively as the Unionist Party. (They are not to be confused with the contemporary Unionist Party in Scotland, which also later merged with the Conservatives.)

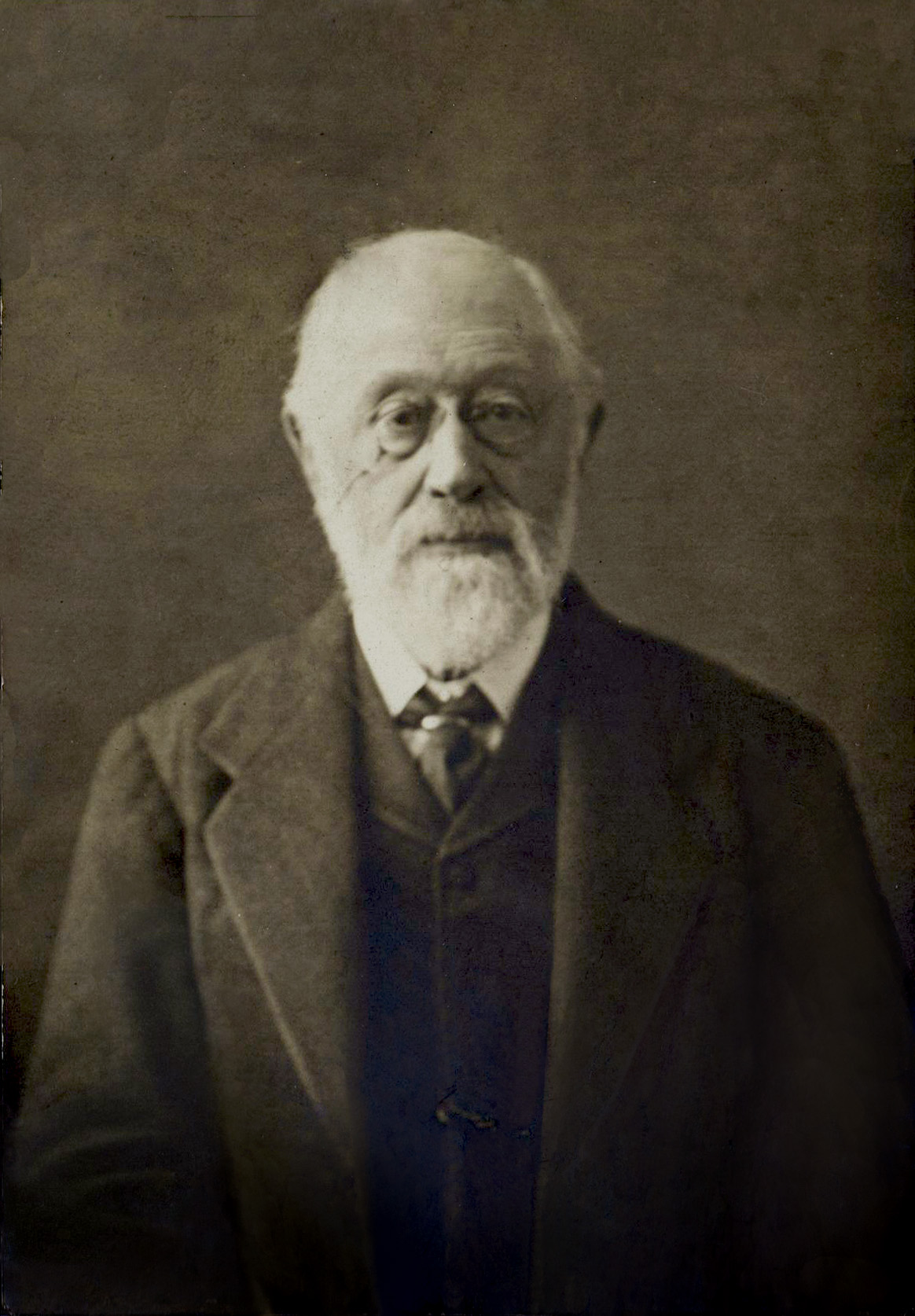
Philip Magnus

Herringham

General election 1918: London University
Party		Candidate	Votes	%	±%
C	Unionist	Philip Magnus	2,810	41.56	−16.58
	Labour	Sidney Webb	2,141	31.67	New
	Teachers	Annesley Somerville	885	13.09	New
	Independent	Wilmot Herringham	715	10.58	New
	Ind. Unionist	Charles Louis Nordon	210	3.11	New
Majority			669	9.89	−6.39
Turnout			6,761	69.01	−4.07
Registered electors			9,797		
	Unionist hold		Swing	N/A	
C indicates candidate endorsed by the coalition government.

=== Elections in the 1920s ===
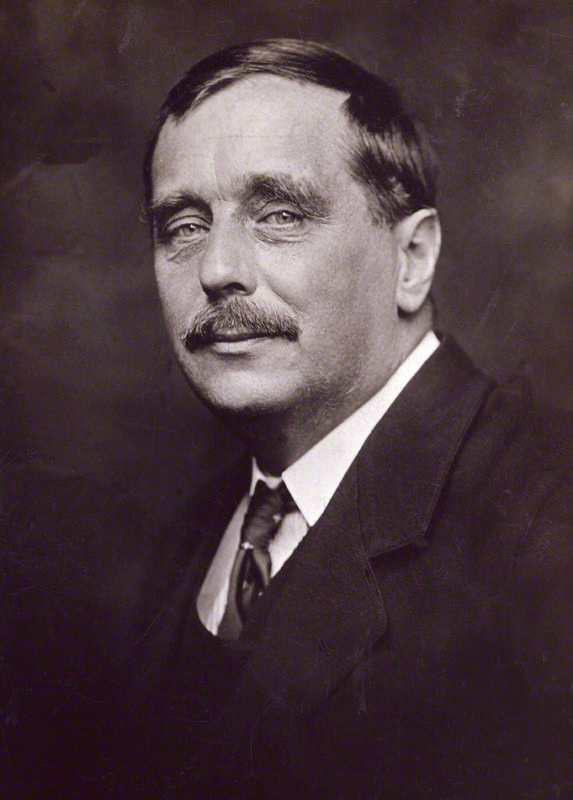
H.G. Wells

General election 1922: London University
Party	Candidate	Votes	%	±%
Unionist	Sydney Russell-Wells	3,833	51.52	+9.96
Liberal	Albert Pollard	2,180	29.30	New
Labour	H. G. Wells	1,427	19.18	−12.49
Majority		1,653	22.22	+12.33
Turnout		7,440	67.64	−1.37
Registered electors		11,000		
Unionist hold		Swing		

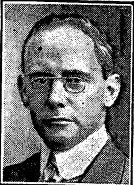
Albert Pollard

General election 1923: London University
Party	Candidate	Votes	%	±%
Unionist	Sydney Russell-Wells	4,037	50.15	−1.37
Liberal	Albert Pollard	2,593	32.21	+2.91
Labour	H. G. Wells	1,420	17.64	−1.54
Majority		1,444	17.94	−4.28
Turnout		8,050	71.28	+3.64
Registered electors		11,293		
Unionist hold		Swing	−2.14	

General election 1924: London University
Party	Candidate	Votes	%	±%
Independent	Ernest Graham-Little	3,202	37.06	+37.06
Unionist	John Bradford	2,813	32.55	−17.60
Liberal	Albert Pollard	1,539	17.81	−14.40
Labour	Frank George Bushnell	1,087	12.58	−5.06
Majority		389	4.51	N/A
Turnout		8,641	72.03	+0.75
Registered electors		11,997		
Independent gain from Unionist		Swing		

General election 1929: London University
Party	Candidate	Votes	%	±%
Independent	Ernest Graham-Little	5,869	53.5	+16.4
Liberal	Walter Layton	2,923	26.6	+8.8
Unionist	Sir John William Gilbert	2,179	19.9	−12.7
Majority		2,946	26.9	+22.4
Turnout		10,971	70.5	−1.5
Independent hold		Swing		

=== Elections in the 1930s ===
General election 1931: London University
Party	Candidate	Votes	%	±%
National Independent	Ernest Graham-Little	8,461	72.97	+19.47
Independent National	Archibald Church	3,134	27.03	+27.03
Majority		5,327	45.94	+19.09
Turnout		11,595	70.27	−0.25
Registered electors		16,501		
National gain from Independent				

General election 1935: London University
Party	Candidate	Votes	%	±%
National Independent	Ernest Graham-Little	8,958	69.57	−3.40
Labour	Norman Angell	3,918	30.43	New
Majority		5,040	39.14	−6.80
Turnout		12,876	71.74	+1.47
Registered electors		17,949		
National Independent hold		Swing		

=== Elections in the 1940s ===
General election 1945: London University
Party	Candidate	Votes	%	±%
National Independent	Ernest Graham-Little	7,618	50.49	−19.08
Independent Progressive	Mary Stocks	7,469	49.51	New
Majority		149	0.98	−38.16
Turnout		15,087	63.00	−8.74
Registered electors		23,948		
National Independent hold		Swing		

== See also ==
- List of former United Kingdom Parliament constituencies

== Bibliography ==
- Boundaries of Parliamentary Constituencies 1885–1972, compiled and edited by F.W.S. Craig (Parliamentary Reference Publications 1972)
- British Parliamentary Election Results 1832–1885, compiled and edited by F.W.S. Craig (Macmillan Press 1977)
- British Parliamentary Election Results 1885–1918, compiled and edited by F.W.S. Craig (Macmillan Press 1974)
- British Parliamentary Election Results 1918–1949, compiled and edited by F.W.S. Craig (Macmillan Press, revised edition 1977)
- Electoral Reform in War and Peace 1906–18, by Martin Pugh (Routledge & Kegan Paul 1978)
- Who's Who of British members of parliament: Volume I 1832–1885, edited by M. Stenton (The Harvester Press 1976)
- Who's Who of British members of parliament, Volume II 1886–1918, edited by M. Stenton and S. Lees (Harvester Press 1978)
- Who's Who of British members of parliament, Volume III 1919–1945, edited by M. Stenton and S. Lees (Harvester Press 1979)
- Who's Who of British members of parliament, Volume IV 1945–1979, edited by M. Stenton and S. Lees (Harvester Press 1981)
- Leigh Rayment's Historical List of MPs – Constituencies beginning with "L" (part 3)
