= Philip Magnus (historian) =

British biographer and historian

Sir Philip Montefiore Magnus-Allcroft, 2nd Baronet, CBE JP (8 February 1906 – 21 December 1988), was a British biographer. He wrote under the name Philip Magnus.

Magnus-Allcroft was born in London, the son of Laurie Magnus and Dora Marian Spielmann, the grandson of the educationalist and Conservative politician Sir Philip Magnus, 1st Baronet. He was a member of a notable Jewish family; his paternal grandmother was the historian Katie Emmanuel and his maternal grandmother was Emily Sebag-Montefiore.

Educated at Westminster School and Wadham College, Oxford, Magnus succeeded to the baronetcy in 1933.

During the Second World War he was a captain in the Royal Artillery and the Intelligence Corps, rising to the rank of major. He married Jewell Allcroft in 1943, and in 1951 added the name of Allcroft to his own by deed poll.

In later years, as well as writing, he served as a justice of the peace, Shropshire County Councillor, chairman of its planning committee and the records committee, chairman of the governors of Attingham College and governor of Ludlow Grammar School. Between 1970 and 1977 he was a trustee of the National Portrait Gallery. He lived in Stokesay Court, Shropshire, England.

== Publications ==
Magnus-Allcroft (under pen-name Philip Magnus) was author of several biographies:

- Edmund Burke: A Prophet of the Eighteenth Century, 1939
- Sir Walter Raleigh, 1952
- Gladstone – a biography, 1954
- Kitchener – portrait of an Imperialist, 1958
- King Edward the Seventh, 1964

== Arms ==
Coat of arms of Philip Magnus
Crest A magnolia tree flowered Proper. Escutcheon Bendy of six Gules and Vert on a fess Or an open book Proper between two martlets Sable. Motto Fide Et Labore

Baronetage of the United Kingdom
Preceded by Philip Magnus	Baronet (of Tangley Hill); 1933–1988	Succeeded by Laurence Henry Philip Magnus
