= Magnus baronets =

Baronetcy in the Baronetage of the United Kingdom

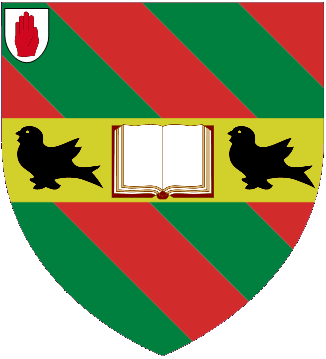
- Escutcheon of the Magnus baronets of Tangley Hill (1917)
- Creation date: 1917
- Status: extant
- Motto: Fide et labore, By faith and work
- Arms: Bendy of six Gules and Vert on a fess Or and open book Proper between two martlets Sable
- Crest: A magnolia tree flowered Proper

The Magnus Baronetcy, of Tangley Hill in Wonersh in the County of Surrey, is a title in the Baronetage of the United Kingdom. It was created on 22 June 1917 for the educationalist and Conservative politician Philip Magnus. He represented London University in the House of Commons from 1906 to 1922. He was succeeded by his grandson, the second Baronet, who was a historian and biographer. In 1951 he assumed by deed poll the additional surname of Allcroft. He died childless and was succeeded by his nephew, the third Baronet and (as of 2022) present holder of the title.

== Magnus baronets, later Magnus-Allcroft, later Magnus baronets, of Tangley Hill (1917) ==
- Sir Philip Magnus, 1st Baronet (1842–1933)
- Sir Philip Magnus-Allcroft, 2nd Baronet (1906–1988)
- Sir Laurence Henry Philip Magnus, 3rd Baronet (b. 1955)

The heir apparent is the present holder’s eldest son Thomas Henry Philip Magnus (b. 1985).
