= Lucien Wolf =

English Jewish journalist

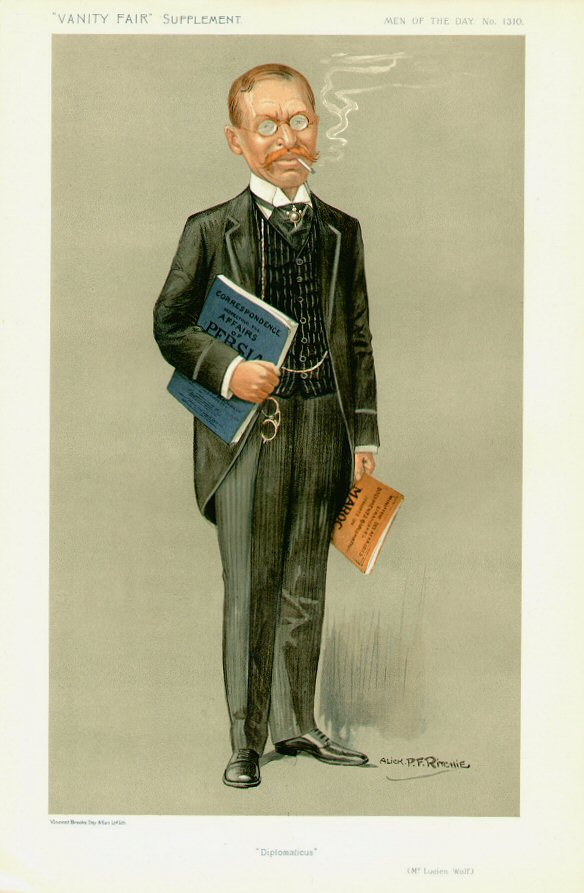
- "Diplomaticus"; Wolf as caricatured in Vanity Fair, December 1911
- Born: January 20, 1857
- Died: September 23, 1930 (aged 73)
- Other name: Diplomaticus (pseudonym)
- Occupations: Journalist, historian, diplomat
- Known for: Authority on anti-Semitism

Lucien Wolf (20 January 1857 in London – 23 August 1930) was an English Jewish journalist, diplomat, historian, and advocate of rights for Jews and other minorities. While Wolf was devoted to minority rights, he opposed Jewish nationalism as expressed in Zionism, which he regarded as an incentive to anti-Semitism. In 1917, he co-founded the anti-Zionist League of British Jews.

== Early life ==
He was the son of Edward Wolf, a London pipe manufacturer, and his wife Céline (née Redlich). Wolf's father was a Bohemian Jew who came to England as a political refugee after the 1848 revolution, and his mother was Viennese.

== Career in journalism ==
Wolf began his career in journalism as early as 1874, at the age of seventeen, becoming a writer for the Jewish World and remaining at this position until 1894; from 1905 to 1908, he would serve as its editor. He specialized in foreign affairs and diplomacy and became a highly respected expert on the subject.

In 1877, he became assistant director of the Public Leader. From 1890 to 1909, he was foreign editor of The Daily Graphic, writing under the pseudonym Diplomaticus. From 1895 to 1905, he wrote under the same pseudonym for the Fortnightly Review. As indicated by his pseudonym, Wolf's writings dealt primarily foreign affairs and diplomacy and he became a respected expert in these fields.

The outbreak of the anti-Jewish pogroms in Russia in 1881 sparked his interest in Jewish affairs. He became a sharp critic of the Tsarist autocracy and attempted to draw attention to the plight of Russian Jews. In 1912, Wolf founded and wrote a supplement named Darkest Russia to the Jewish Chronicle. With the outbreak of the First World War, Wolf's preference for the more liberal German government to the Russian practically ended his career in journalism, as the British were allied with Russia against Germany.

== Anglo-Jewry ==
Wolf was an enthusiast for Jewish history, and promoting Jewishness. In London, he organised the 1887 Anglo-Jewish Historical Exhibition charting the immigration of Jews to Britain from across Europe over the centuries. In 1893, Wolf was one of the founders and the first president of the Jewish Historical Society of England. His historical writings rarely extended beyond the aristocracy, exhibiting his own upper-middle class pretensions. Against racial anti-Semitism, he championed Judaism, even offering eugenic justifications for its superiority.

== Anti-Zionism ==
Lucien Wolf was opposed to political Zionism. As an assimilationist, he believed Jewishness was a spiritual and religious identity and not a national one. He vigorously opposed the new Zionist movement that had been formed in Manchester. As a powerful editor, Wolf had access to ministers, whom he lobbied frantically to prevent the issuing of the Balfour Declaration. When the Declaration was made public on 2 November 1917, he soon co-founded the anti-Zionist League of British Jews.

Wolf understood Nahum Sokolow and Chaim Weizmann's position as threatening the nationality status of British Jews.

== Conjoint Committee ==
In 1888, Lucien Wolf became a member of the Conjoint Foreign Committee, a coordinating organ of the Board of Deputies of British Jews and the Anglo-Jewish Association. Around the start of the First World War, he was appointed secretary, which led to his contacts at the British Foreign Office. He served effectively as "Foreign Secretary" representing Anglo-Jewry, having frequent meetings with members of the Cabinet.

After the committee published an anti-Zionist manifest in May 1917 without first consulting the Board of Deputies or the Anglo-Jewish Association, the mainly pro-Zionist Board of Deputies withdrew its delegates. By the end of 1917, the committee was re-established under the new name Joint Foreign Committee. This time, the Anglo-Jewish Association was allotted a minority of members in the committee. Lucien Wolf became again its secretary and held this function until his death in 1930.

== 1919 and after ==
Wolf was part of the Anglo-Jewish delegation to the 1919 Paris Peace Conference. He helped draft the Minority Treaties, which guaranteed rights for ethnic, religious, and linguistic minority populations. The Jewish delegations to the conference were split along different ideological lines. Western Europeans were cautious of both Zionism and diaspora nationalism, wanting Jews to be integrated with society.

During the 1920s, anti-Semitism became more intensive and organised, particularly in Poland, which had one of Europe's largest Jewish minority populations. The following year in 1926, he went to Portugal to aid the Marranos. Wolf continued to write extensively and in an outspoken manner against Zionist proponents, which he believed was leading to conflict and crises. In 1927, Romanian Jews continued to be victims of pogroms: his work and expertise was recognised by appointment as an Advisor to the Committee for Refugees for the League of Nations at Geneva, which he founded in 1929.

== Some works by Lucien Wolf ==
=== Newspapers ===
- The Zionist Peril, The Times, 8 September 1903

=== Articles ===
- Parallels of the 17th and 20th Centuries (1885)
- 'Jewish Education', A Lay Sermon – Manuscript (1886)
- A Final Note on the Resettlement" published in The Jewish Chronicle (1886)
- Surrey Families (Jews in England) (1887)
- The City of London and the Jews (1888)
- Early History of the Dublin Hebrew Congregation (1889)
- "Situation of Jews in Bagdad", reprint from The Jewish Chronicle (1889)
- The Zionist Peril, Jewish Quarterly Review, 17 October 1904, p. 1–25.
- "Anglo-Jewish literary ability", Anglo-Jewish Literary Annual (1905)
- The Jewish National Movement, Edinburgh Review, April 1917, pp. 303–318.
- "Notes on the Diplomatic History of the Jewish Question" Jewish Historical Society of England (London 1919)
- The Myth of the Jewish Menace in World Affairs (1920): this is an edited compilation of articles – published previously in various periodicals – denying the authenticity of "The Protocols."
- The Jewish Bogey and the Forged Protocols of the Learned Elders of Zion (London 1920)
- 'Jews in the Canary Islands, Being a calendar of Jewish cases extracted from the records of the Canariote Inquisition in the collection of the Marquess of Bute', Jewish Historical Society (1926)
- "Report on the "Marranos" or Crypto-Jews of Portugal", Anglo-Jewish Association (1926)

=== Books ===
- The Russian Conspiracy or Russian Monopoly in Opposition to Britain Interest in the East (Birmingham 1877)
- Sir Moses Montefiore: A Centennial Biography with Selections from Letters and Journals (Paris, 1885)
- The Treves Family in England (1896)
- Menasseh ben Israel’s Mission to Oliver Cromwell (1901)
- Introduction: in E Semenoff, The Russian Government and the Massacres: A Page of the Russian Counter-Revolution (London 1907)
- The Legal Sufferings of The Jews of Russia (London 1912)
- Notes on the Diplomatic History of the Jewish Question: With Texts of Protocols, Treaty Stipulations and Other Public Acts and Official Documents (1919)
- The Myth of the Jewish Menace in World Affairs: The Truth about the Forged Protocols of the Elders of Zion (1920) ISBN 1478101334
- The Myth of the Jewish Menace in World Affairs, or The Truth about the Forged Protocols of the Elders of Zion (1921)
- The Montefiore Family (c1921)
- The Geneboten Jubilee: The Romance of a Bohemian Village
- The Queen's Jewry 1837–1897
- Anti-Semitism

=== Memoranda ===
- Memorandum on Russian discrimination against British Jews (Passport Question) (1890–1891)
- Memorandum and correspondence regarding Lucien Wolf's meeting with the Russian Minister of Interior Viacheslav Konstantinovich Plehve (1903)
- Outrages on the Jews (Appeal by the Russo-Jewish Committee) (1905)
- Memorandum on the treaty rights of Jews in Romania (1908)
- Memorandum on Russian discrimination against British Jews (Passport Question) (1912)
- Rights of British Jews Travelling in Russia" (1913)
- Conjoint Foreign Committee to Sir Edward Grey regarding British Jews in Russia (1913)
- Greetings to the [American Jewish] Congress from Lucien Wolf (1916)
- Report on the Polish Negotiations in Paris (1919)
- Report on his interview with Paderewski (1919)
- Romania and the Minorities Treaties – "Draft of a Treaty with Roumania" (1920)
- Memorandum on the Austrian Interpretation of Article 80 of the Treaty of St. Germain (1921)
- Russo-Jewish Refugees in Constantinople (1922)
- Report on Immigration Possibilities in Portugal and Spain (1926)

Preceded by none	President of the Jewish Historical Society of England	Succeeded by Hermann Adler
