= Leonard Arthur Magnus =

Leonard Arthur Magnus, LL.B. (December 12, 1879 – September 11, 1924) was a British scholar and translator, with interests in Russian literature, as well as the author of a novel of utopian fiction.

== Biography ==
Leonard A. Magnus was son of Sir Philip Magnus, Bt. and Lady Magnus. He was the editor of Respublica for the Early English Text Society, a translator from Russian, and an author of his own works.

In 1923–1924 he was traveling in the interior of Russia, facilitated by the Commissar of Education of Russia Lunacharsky, pursuing his studies in the folklore of Russia. He was "attacked by a malignant germ" and failed to get home, dying in Russia, in a nursing-home in Moscow.

== Works ==
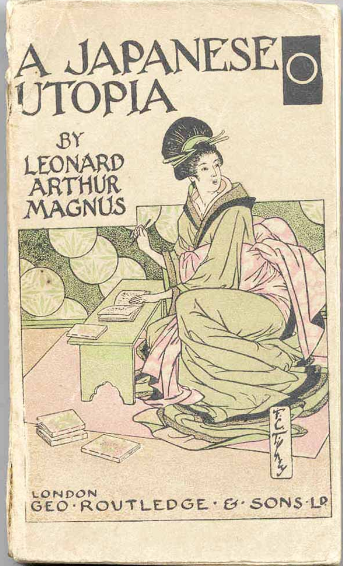
A Japanese Utopia book cover

- A Japanese Utopia (1905)
  A Japanese protagonist finds a utopian lost world north of Japan.
- A Concise Grammar of the Russian Language (1916)
- Roumania's Cause & Ideals (1917)
- Pros and Cons of the Great War: A Record of Foreign Opinion, with a Register of Fact (1917)
  "a collection of brief extracts and quotations from various foreign writings and speeches, principally German; as references to sources are given the compilation can be made to serve some of the uses of a bibliography."
- The Heroic Ballads of Russia (1921)
- Russian Folk-Tales by Alexander Afanasyev
  translation, with introduction
- The Tale of the Armament of Igor (1915)
  translation of The Tale of Igor's Campaign from Russian, editing, with introduction, notes, and glossary
- Three plays by Anatoly Lunacharsky
  Translation with collaboration with K. Walter for Broadway Translations
