= Sir Laurie Magnus, 3rd Baronet =

British executive (born 1955)

Sir Laurie Magnus Bt CBE
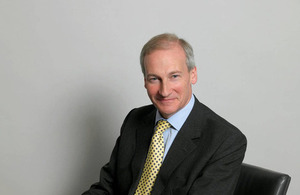
- Magnus in 2013.

Independent Adviser on Ministers' Interests
- Incumbent
- Assumed office 22 December 2022
- Prime Minister: Rishi Sunak; Sir Keir Starmer; Andy Burnham

Chairman of Heritage of London Trust
- Incumbent
- Assumed office 2023
- Preceded by: Jamie Cayzer-Colvin

Personal details
- Born: Laurence Henry Philip Magnus; 24 September 1955 (age 70)
- Relatives: Philip Magnus (uncle)
- Education: Christ Church, Oxford (BA)

Sir Laurence Henry Philip Magnus, 3rd Baronet, CBE (born 24 September 1955) is a British executive who has worked as a financier in the City of London, and was appointed as the UK Prime Minister's Independent Adviser on Ministers' Interests in December 2022.

== Life and career ==
Born into a well-established Anglo-Jewish family, he was educated at Eton College and Christ Church, Oxford, and is the 3rd Baronet of Tangley Hill, a title he inherited upon the death of his uncle, Sir Philip Magnus-Allcroft in 1988.

Magnus had a four-decade career in finance in the City of London, including chairing Lexicon Partners and acting as a senior adviser at the investment banking firm Evercore.

He served as Deputy Chairman of the National Trust between 2005 and 2013. In September 2013, he was appointed chairman of the Historic Buildings and Monuments Commission for England by Secretary of State for Culture Maria Miller, and was tasked with dividing the organisation into two: Historic England, which retained the statutory and protection functions, and the new English Heritage Trust, a charity that would operate the historic properties, and retained the English Heritage operating name and logo.

During the COVID-19 pandemic he was appointed to the board of the Culture Recovery Fund, a fund established by the UK government to help cultural bodies affected by the pandemic. Magnus was appointed a CBE in the 2022 New Year Honours. As of April 2023, he was appointed Chairman of Heritage of London Trust.

On 22 December 2022, he was appointed by Prime Minister Rishi Sunak to the role of Independent Adviser on Ministers' Interests, following Christopher Geidt, who had stepped down from the position in June 2022. The role is a non-renewable five-year appointment.

On 5 September 2025, his report found that Angela Rayner, the Deputy Prime Minister of the United Kingdom, had broken the Ministerial Code after she was found to have failed to pay enough stamp duty on the purchase of a property in Hove. She subsequently resigned from the Cabinet on the basis of this report.

Baronetage of the United Kingdom
Preceded by Sir Philip Magnus-Allcroft, 2nd Baronet	Baronet (of Tangley Hill); 1988–present	Incumbent
