= Laurie Magnus =

Publisher, author and director of Routledge and Sons

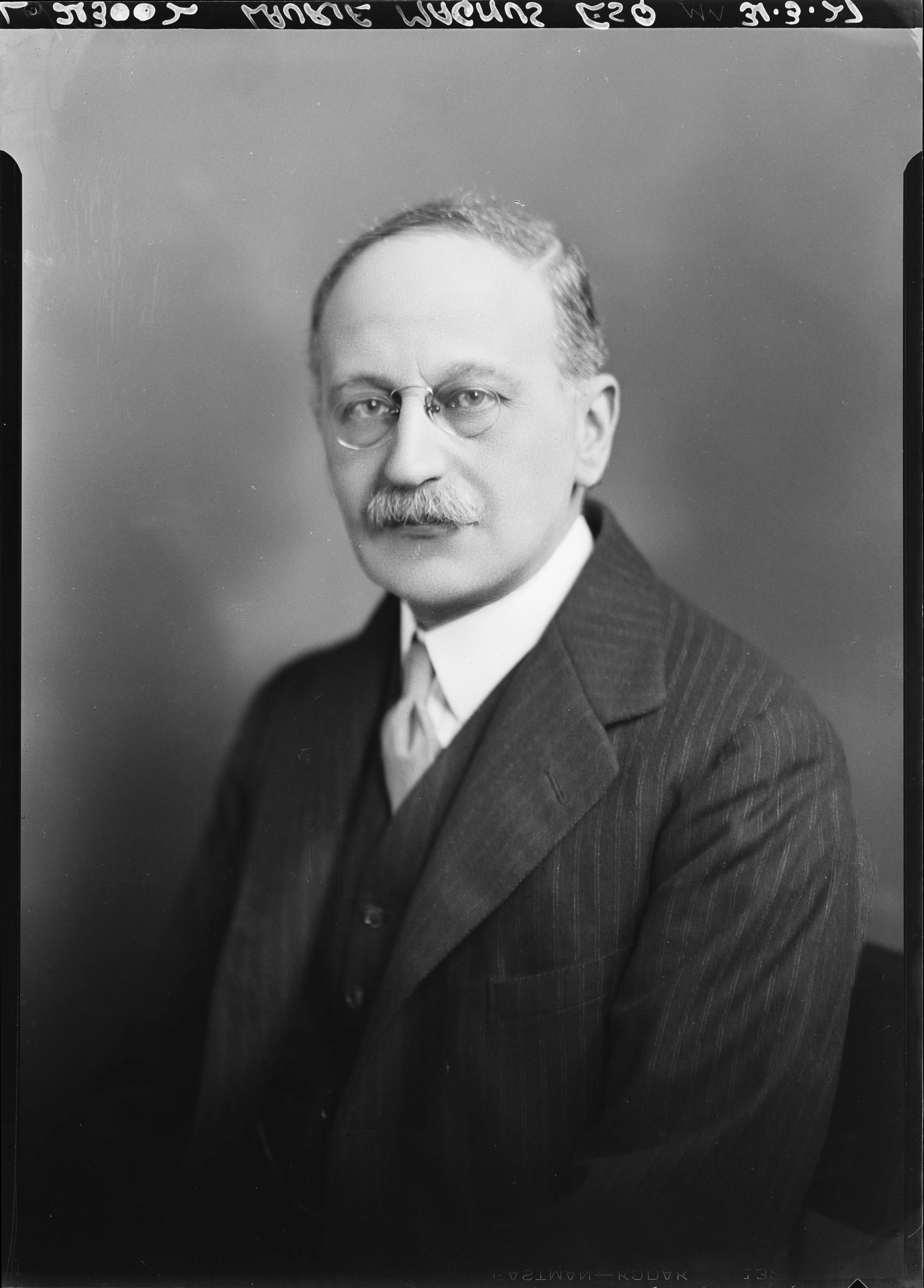
- Magnus in 1927
- Born: 5 August 1872; London, United Kingdom
- Died: 28 April 1933 (aged 60)
- Education: St Paul's School, London; Magdalen College, Oxford
- Spouse: Dora Marian Spielmann (m. 1903)
- Children: Philip Magnus-Allcroft; Ruth Sebag-Montefiore
- Parent(s): Sir Philip Magnus (father); Katie Emanuel (mother)
- Relatives: Sir Isidore Spielmann (father-in-law)

Laurie Magnus (5 August 1872 – 28 April 1933) was an English author, journalist, and publisher.

== Biography ==
Magnus was born in London to Jewish parents Katie and Sir Philip Magnus. He was educated at St Paul's School, and graduated with a Master of Arts from Magdalen College, Oxford, where he read classics.

He was the Berlin correspondent of the London Morning Post (1896–1900) and leader-writer for the same paper. By 1904, he was a joint managing director of George Routledge & Sons. Magnus edited a series of Secondary Education Text-Books for the publishing house of John Murray, published A Primer of Wordsworth, translated the first volume of Greek Thinkers (from the German of Theodor Gomperz), and edited Prayers from the Poets and Flowers of the Cave (in conjunction with Cecil Headlam). He also wrote Aspects of the Jewish Question (1902), reprinted and enlarged from the Jewish Quarterly Review.

Magnus unsuccessfully ran as a Unionist for Bristol North in the December 1910 British general election, and was a major in the Royal Defence Corps during World War I. He was active in Jewish communal life as a warden of the West London Synagogue, a member of the council of Jews' College, and president of the Union of Jewish Literary Societies.

== Partial bibliography ==
- Magnus, Laurie (1897). A Primer of Wordsworth: With a Critical Essay. London: Methuen & Co.
- Magnus, Laurie; Headlam, Cecil, eds. (1899). Prayers from the Poets: A Calendar of Devotion. Edinburgh and London: William Blackwood and Sons.
- Magnus, Laurie; Headlam, Cecil, eds. (1901). Flowers of the Cave. Edinburgh and London: William Blackwood and Sons. hdl:2027/hvd.hxczs8.
- Magnus, Laurie, ed. (1901). National Education: Essays Towards a Construction Policy. London: John Murray.
- Magnus, Laurie (1902). Introduction to Poetry: Poetic Expression, Poetic Truth, the Progress of Poetry. London: John Murray.
- Magnus, Laurie (1902). Aspects of the Jewish Question: Zionism and Anti-Semitism. New York: Bloch Publishing Company.
- Magnus, Laurie, ed. (1906). Documents Illustrating Elizabethan Poetry. London: George Routledge & Sons.
- Magnus, Laurie (1906). How to read English literature. Vol. 1. London: George Routledge & Sons.
- Magnus, Laurie (1907). How to read English literature. Vol. 2. London: George Routledge & Sons.
- Magnus, Laurie (1907). 'Religio Laici' Judaica: The Faith of a Jewish Layman. London: George Routledge & Sons.
- Gomperz, Theodor (1906). Greek Thinkers: A History of Ancient Philosophy. Vol. 1. Translated by Magnus, Laurie. London: John Murray.
- Magnus, Laurie (1909). English Literature in the Nineteenth Century: An Essay in Criticism. London: Andrew Melrose.
- Magnus, Laurie (1909). The Jewish Board of Guardians and the Men Who Made It, 1859–1909: An Illustrated Record. London: The Jewish Board of Guardians.
- Magnus, Laurie (1914). The Third Great War: In Relation to Modern History. Bristol: J. W. Arrowsmith.
- Magnus, Laurie (1917). Zionism and the Neo-Zionists. London: St Clements Press.
- Magnus, Laurie (1918). A General Sketch of European Literature in the Centuries of Romance. Kegan Paul, Trench, Trubner & Co.
- Magnus, Laurie (1926). A Dictionary of European Literature: Designed as a Companion to English Studies. London: George Routledge & Sons.
- Magnus, Laurie (1927). English Literature in Its Foreign Relations, 1300 to 1800. London: Kegan Paul, Trench, Trubner & Co.
- Magnus, Laurie (1929). The Jews in the Christian Era: From the First to the Eighteenth Century, and Their Contribution to Its Civilization. London: Ernest Benn.
- Magnus, Laurie (1932). Herbert Warren of Magdalen: President and Friend, 1853–1930. London: John Murray.
