= Katie Magnus =

British author and communal worker

Katie Magnus, Lady Magnus (née Emanuel; 2 May 1844 – March 1924), was a British author and communal worker.

A Jew, she was born to E. Emanuel in Portsmouth, and married Sir Philip Magnus. She was a member of various committees of the Berkeley Street Synagogue, engaged in the Jews' Deaf and Dumb Home, and was a treasurer of the Jewish Girls' Club. She wrote several popular books, and also contributed with articles to several periodicals.

She died in London in March 1924.

== Works ==
- Little Miriam's Bible Stories
- Holiday Stories
- About the Jews Since Bible Times (London, 1881)
- Salvage (1899)
- Outlines of Jewish History (1890)
- Jewish Portraits (1897)
- First Makers of England (London, 1901)
- A Book of Verse (1905)
