= Chatkalskiy State Nature Reserve =

State nature reserve in Uzbekistan

Chatkal State Nature Reserve
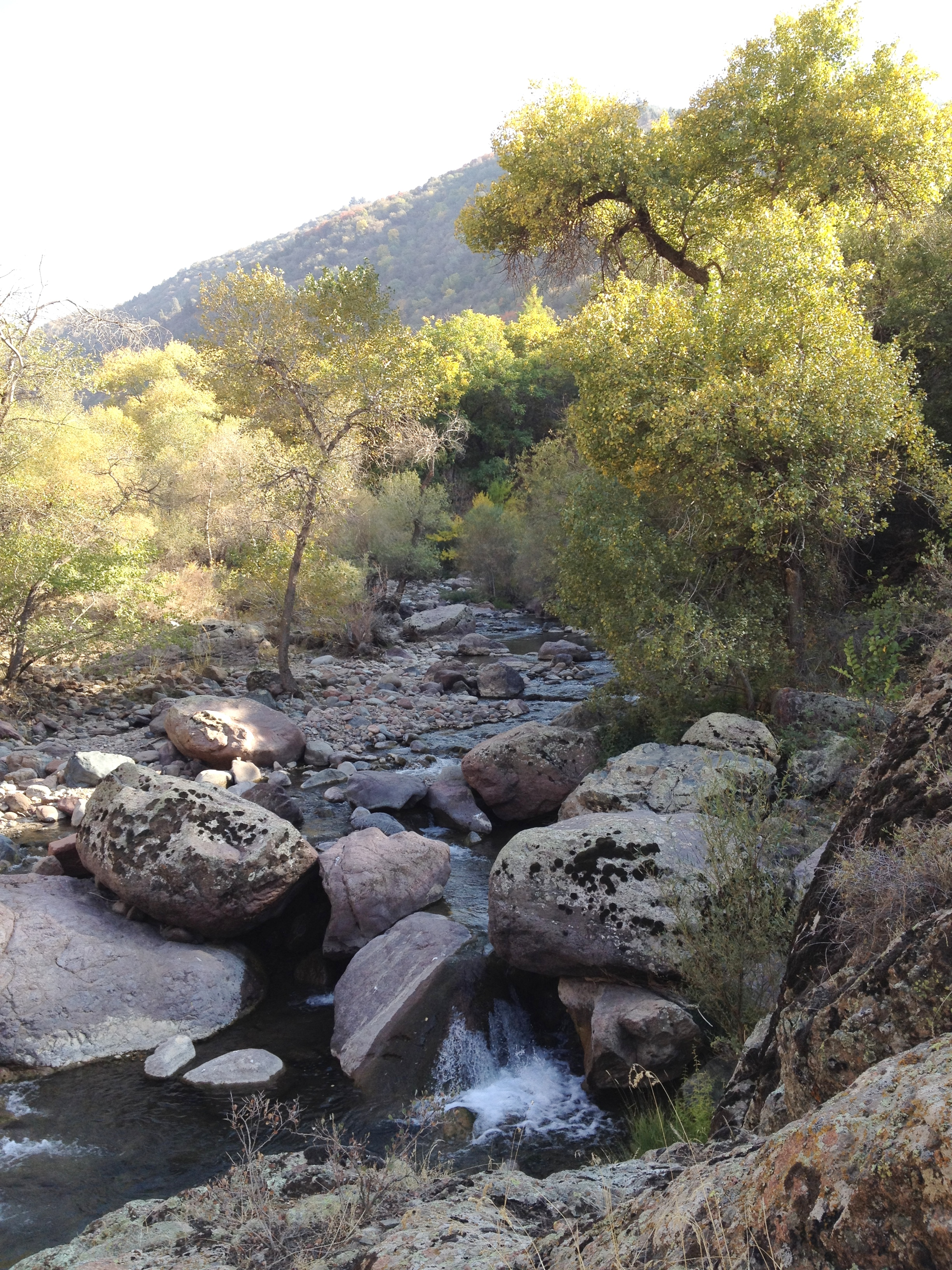
- Chatkal State Nature Reserve
- Interactive map of Chatkal State Nature Reserve
- Type: Nature Reserve
- Location: Tashkent Province, Uzbekistan
- Coordinates: 41°10′N 69°45′E
- Area: 570 square kilometres
- Created: 1947

Chatkal State Nature Reserve is a reserve in the Tashkent Province of Uzbekistan comprising about 570 square kilometres of mountain steppes, mountain forests, alpine meadows, river valleys and floodplain forests. The state nature preserve was established here in 1947, and it was designated a UNESCO biosphere reserve in 1978. The most important river in this area is the Tereklisay, flowing from south to north across the nature reserve.

In 2012, a set of postage stamps was issued in Uzbekistan, as part of the Chatkal Nature Reserve Series, comprising seven stamps, including Iris tubergeniana, Himalayan Brown Bear (Ursus arctos isabellinus), Menzbier's Marmot (Marmota menzbieri), Trichius fasciatus (Eurasian Bee Beetle) and Bubo bubo (Eurasian Eagle-owl).
