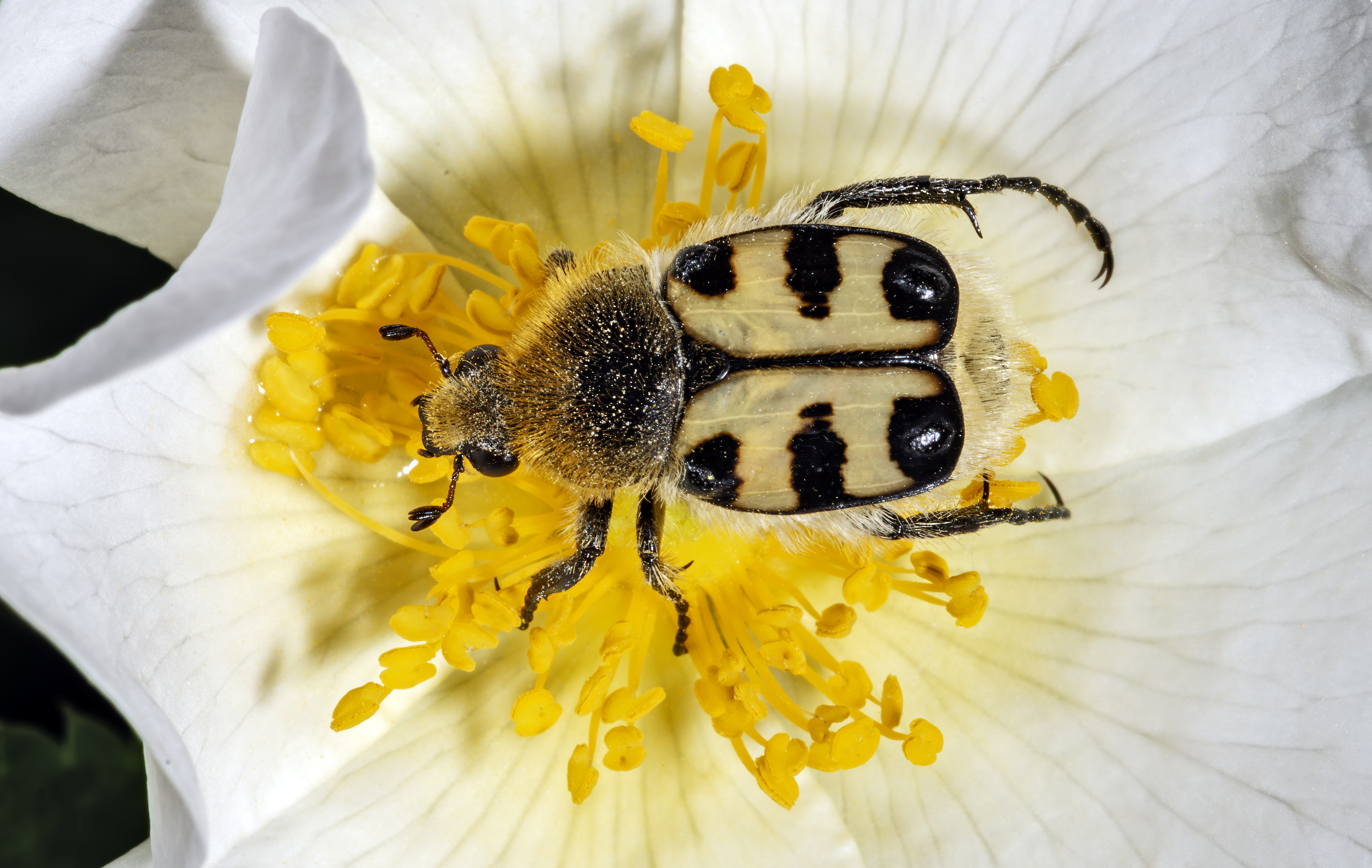

Scientific classification
- Kingdom: Animalia
- Phylum: Arthropoda
- Clade: Pancrustacea
- Class: Insecta
- Order: Coleoptera
- Suborder: Polyphaga
- Infraorder: Scarabaeiformia
- Family: Scarabaeidae
- Genus: Trichius
- Species: T. gallicus

Binomial name
- Trichius gallicus (Dejean, 1821)

Synonyms
- Trichius rosaceus Voet, 1778 (nomen nudum); Trichius conjugatus Tesař, 1935; Trichius interruptoides Tesař, 1935; Trichius zonatus gratiosulus Tesař, 1935; Trichius zonatus obenbergianus Tesař, 1935; Trichius zonatus reductulus Tesař, 1935; Trichius zonatus stepaneki Tesař, 1935; Trichius zonatus taborskyi Tesař, 1935; Trichius rosaceus externenotatus Pic, 1923; Trichius rosaceus vodozi Schneider, 1902; Trichius zonatus nigerrimus Schneider, 1902; Trichius gallicus nigripennis Bedel, 1894; Trichius rosaceus conjunctus Kraatz, 1891; Trichius rosaceus connexus Kraatz, 1891; Trichius rosaceus corsicus Kraatz, 1891; Trichius rosaceus interruptus Kraatz, 1891; Trichius rosaceus suturalis Kraatz, 1891; Trichius zonatus Germar, 1794; Trichius zonatus Germar, 1831; Trichius zonatus tangerianus Pic, 1947; Trichius zonatus theresae Pic, 1947; Trichius zonatus vaucheri Pic, 1947; Trichius zonatus adornatus Tesař, 1935; Trichius zonatus bistrisignatus Tesař, 1935; Trichius zonatus hierovskyi Tesař, 1935; Trichius zonatus marani Tesař, 1935; Trichius zonatus susterai Tesař, 1935; Trichius rosaceus edoughensis Pic, 1923; Trichius rosaceus multinotatus Pic, 1923; Trichius fortunatarum Blanchard, 1842; Trichius fasciolatus Gené, 1836

= Trichius gallicus =

Species of beetle

Trichius gallicus is a beetle species belonging to the family Scarabaeidae, subfamily Cetoniinae. It frequently appears in the literature under the name "Trichius rosaceus", but this name is permanently unavailable under ICZN Article 11.4, as are all of Voet's names.

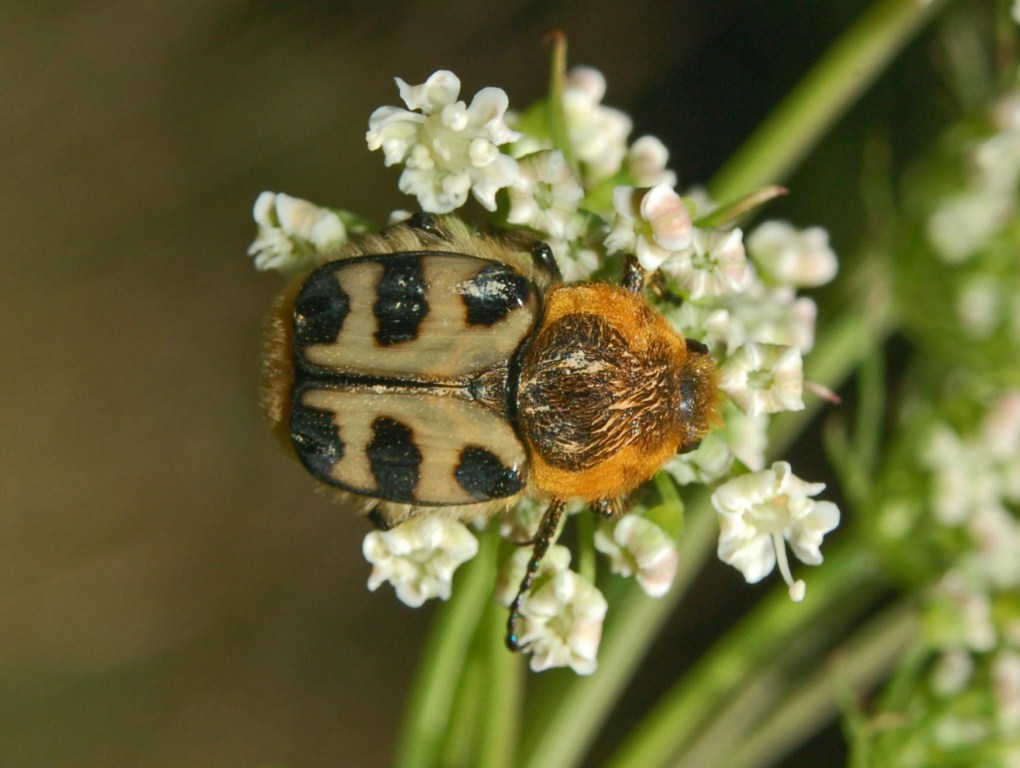

These beetles are present in most of Europe, they are about 10 millimeters long and can be encountered from May through July feeding on flowers.

The sides of the chest and the back of the abdomen are covered with a pubescence, hence the popular name of Bee beetle of Trichius species. Head and pronotum are black, while the elytra are yellowish, crossed by a few black bands.

The first black band usually does not reach the scutellum, other bands are incomplete and the second has a rectangular form. The color of hair usually is more orange-red compared to Trichius fasciatus. Median tibiae are without teeth. In males, only the penultimate abdominal segment has a band of white hairs.

== Subspecies ==
- Trichius gallicus gallicus Dejean, 1821 (Belgium, Czech Republic, Denmark, France, Germany, Great Britain, Iran, Italy, Luxembourg, Netherlands, Poland, Portugal, Slovakia, Slovenia, Spain, Switzerland, Ukraine)
- Trichius gallicus zonatus Germar, 1831 (Sardinia, Morocco, Tunisia)
