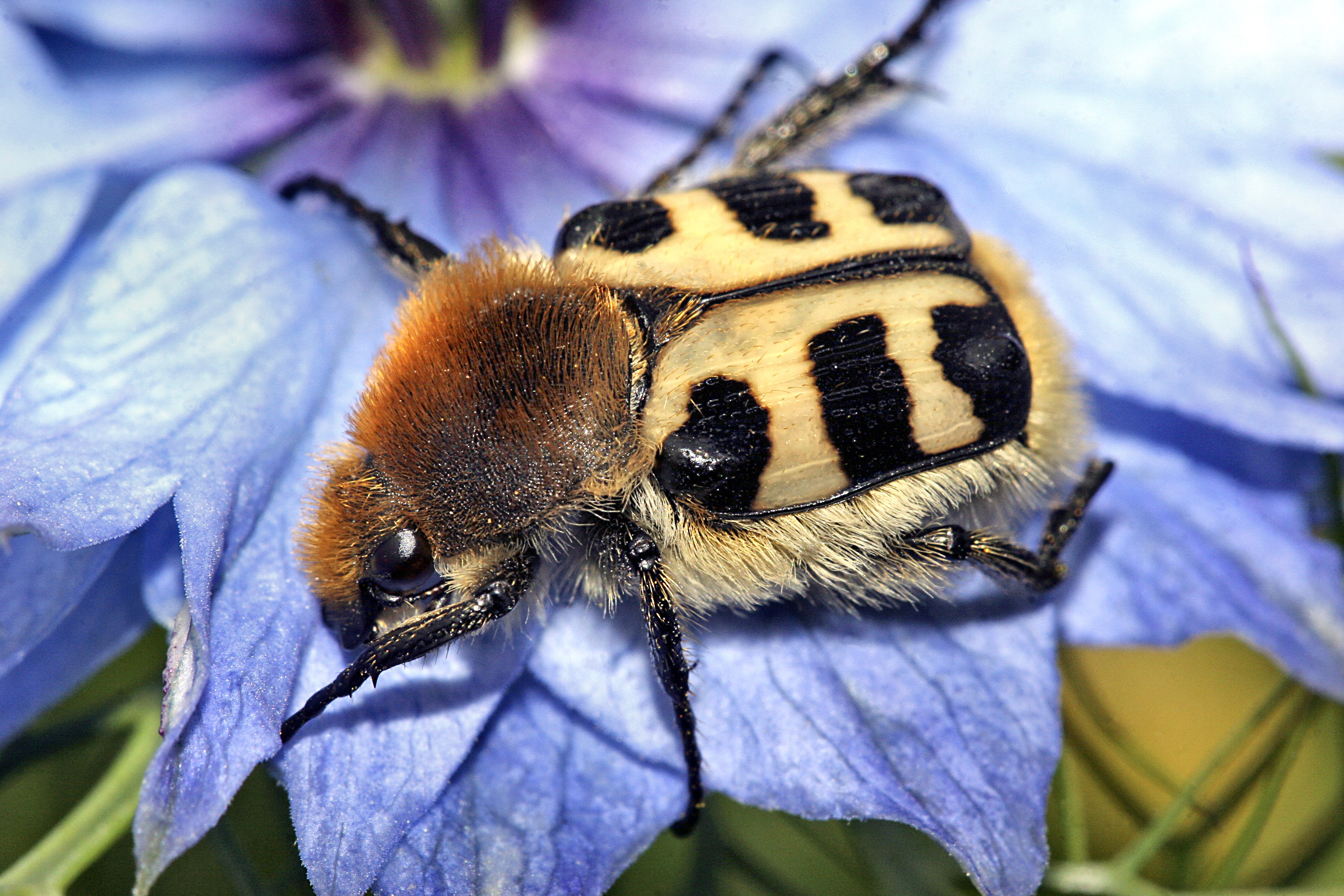
- Trichius gallicus zonatus

Scientific classification
- Kingdom: Animalia
- Phylum: Arthropoda
- Clade: Pancrustacea
- Class: Insecta
- Order: Coleoptera
- Suborder: Polyphaga
- Infraorder: Scarabaeiformia
- Family: Scarabaeidae
- Tribe: Trichiini
- Subtribe: Trichiina
- Genus: Trichius; Fabricius, 1775

Species
- Several, see text

Synonyms
- Evambates Gistel, 1856; Paniscus Gistel, 1848

= Bee beetle =

Genus of beetles

The bee beetles are scarab beetles of the subfamily Cetoniinae.

They have hairy sides of the elytra like their relatives, and the upper sides of the elytra are usually yellow with prominent black blotches which form incomplete bands. This, and the fact that seen from the side they resemble a hairy plump bee, has given them their common name.

== Species ==
- Trichius abdominalis Ménétriés, 1832
- Trichius fasciatus (Linnaeus, 1758)
- Trichius gallicus Dejean, 1821 (= T. rosaceus)
- Trichius japonicus
- Trichius orientalis Reitter, 1894
- Trichius sexualis Bedel, 1906

== Fossil species ==
- †Trichius amoenus Heer, 1847
- †Trichius rotundatus Heer, 1862
- †Trichius unifasciatus Heer, 1862
