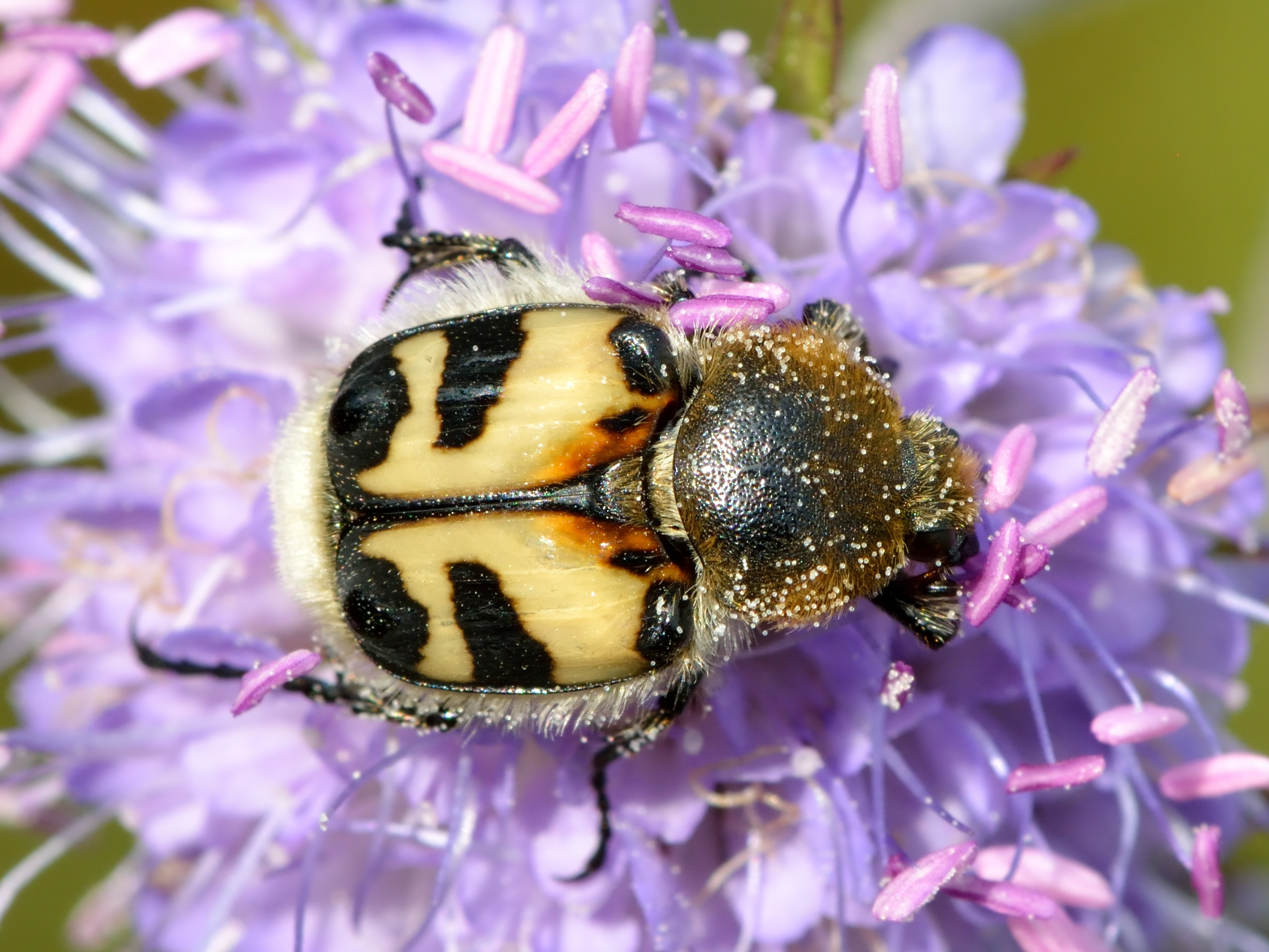

Scientific classification
- Kingdom: Animalia
- Phylum: Arthropoda
- Clade: Pancrustacea
- Class: Insecta
- Order: Coleoptera
- Suborder: Polyphaga
- Infraorder: Scarabaeiformia
- Family: Scarabaeidae
- Genus: Trichius
- Species: T. fasciatus

Binomial name
- Trichius fasciatus (Linnaeus, 1758)

Synonyms
- Scarabaeus fasciatus Linnaeus, 1758; Trichius fasciatus pseudoscutellaris Schulze, 1963; Trichius fasciatus caroli Jesatko, 1942; Trichius fasciatus jesatkoi Tesař, 1938; Trichius fasciatus zeyeri Tesař, 1938; Trichius fasciatus fenicus Tesař, 1935; Trichius fasciatus hieroglyphicus Jesatko, 1935; Trichius fasciatus jureceki Jesatko, 1935; Trichius fasciatus krogerusi Tesař, 1935; Trichius fasciatus lindbergi Tesař, 1935; Trichius fasciatus lojoensis Tesař, 1935; Trichius fasciatus obenbergeri Jesatko, 1935; Trichius fasciatus omissus Tesař, 1935; Trichius fasciatus sekerai Tesař, 1935; Trichius fasciatus sterbai Tesař, 1935; Trichius fasciatus suecica Tesař, 1935; Trichius fasciatus vseteckai Tesař, 1935; Trichius fasciatus ruber Čepelák, 1927; Trichius fasciatus scopolii Depoli, 1924; Trichius fasciatus bisbinotatus Pic, 1923; Trichius fasciatus merkli Roubal, 1919; Trichius fasciatus andersoni Bogdanov-Katjkov, 1913; Trichius fasciatus borealis Schulze, 1910; Trichius fasciatus pseudosibirica Schulze, 1910; Trichius fasciatus rangnowi Schulze, 1910; Trichius fasciatus sahlbergi Schulze, 1910; Trichius fasciatus kuenii Friese, 1896; Trichius fasciatus albohirtus Reitter, 1892; Trichius fasciatus beckersi Schilsky, 1892; Trichius fasciatus bipunctatus Kraatz, 1891; Trichius fasciatus lineatocollis Kraatz, 1891; Trichius fasciatus quadrimaculatus Kraatz, 1891; Trichius fasciatus reitteri Kraatz, 1891; Trichius fasciatus scutellaris Kraatz, 1891; Trichius fasciatus sibiricus Reitter, 1890; Trichius fasciatus abruptus Rossi, 1882; Trichius fasciatus commutatus Rossi, 1882; Trichius fasciatus confluens Rossi, 1882; Trichius fasciatus erichsoni Rossi, 1882; Trichius fasciatus fabrici Rossi, 1882; Trichius fasciatus linnei Rossi, 1882; Trichius fasciatus pulchellus Rossi, 1882; Trichius fasciatus vulgaris Rossi, 1882; Trichius noui Pellet, 1871; Trichius fasciatus abbreviatus Mulsant, 1842; Trichius fasciatus divisus Mulsant, 1842; Trichius fasciatus dubius Mulsant, 1842; Trichius fasciatus interruptus Mulsant, 1842; Trichius fasciatus obliquus Mulsant, 1842; Trichius fasciatus prolongatus Mulsant, 1842; Trichius gallicus abdominalis Mulsant, 1842; Trichius bimaculatus Gebler, 1830; Trichius succinctus Fabricius, 1787

= Trichius fasciatus =

Species of beetle

Trichius fasciatus, the Eurasian bee beetle, is a beetle species belonging to the family Scarabaeidae, subfamily Cetoniinae.

== Varieties ==
Varieties include:

- Trichius fasciatus var. dubius Mulsant
- Trichius fasciatus var. interruptus Mulsant

== Distribution and habitat ==
This beetle is present in most of Europe and in the eastern Palearctic realm.

It is often found in forest clearings in mountainous areas, but rarely in the lowlands. It lives mostly on flowers on forest meadows and forest edges.

== Description ==
Trichius fasciatus can reach a length of 9–12 millimetres (0.35–0.47 in). Head and pronotum are black, while the elytrae vary from light yellow to deep orange. They are crossed by a few black bands. The first black band reaches the scutellum.The sides of the chest and the back of the abdomen are covered with a yellow-orange or white pubescence. This makes it look a bit like a Bumblebee, giving it better protection from predators. Hence the popular name of "Bee beetle" for their genus.

In this species males and females can be easily distinguished based on the front legs. In the female (Encl. 3) the outer teeth are strong, typical for the digging legs. The first tarsus is small and protrudes only slightly from the tip of the terminal tooth. Moreover in the females the pygidium does not end rounded, but clearly indented (Encl. 4). In the male (Encl. 2) the digging teeth are weaker. The 1st segment of the tarsus clearly protrudes beyond the end tooth and is bulbously thickened on the outside. There is a strong transverse ridge about halfway up the mesotibia, which ends in a tooth (Encl. 1).

== Biology ==
Adults can be encountered from May through July feeding on pollen of various flowering plants. These include Apiaceae, Rosaceae, Thymus, Thistles and. Blackberry. The larvae feed mainly on dead wood and other organic parts of various deciduous trees.

== Gallery ==
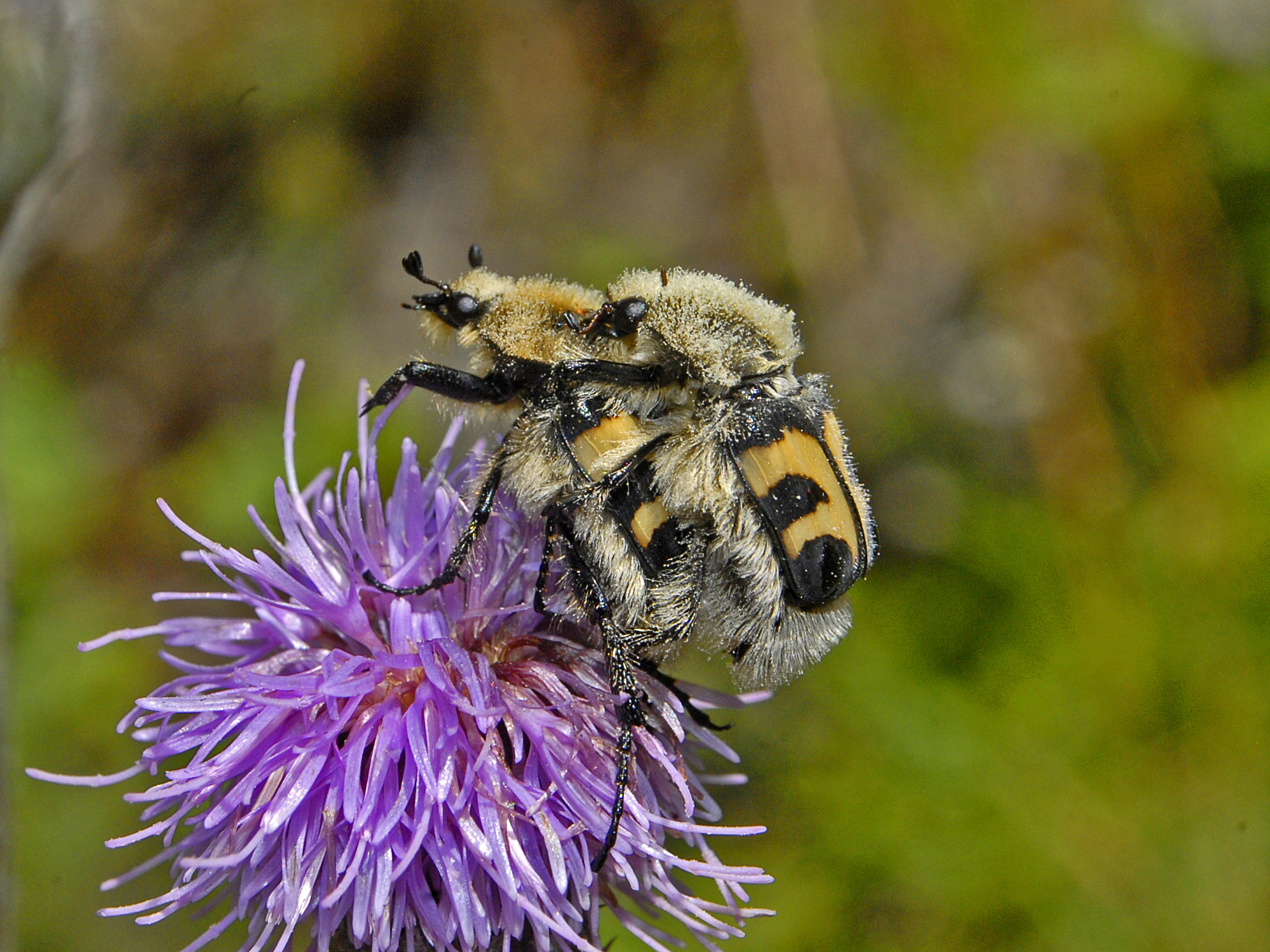
Mating couple

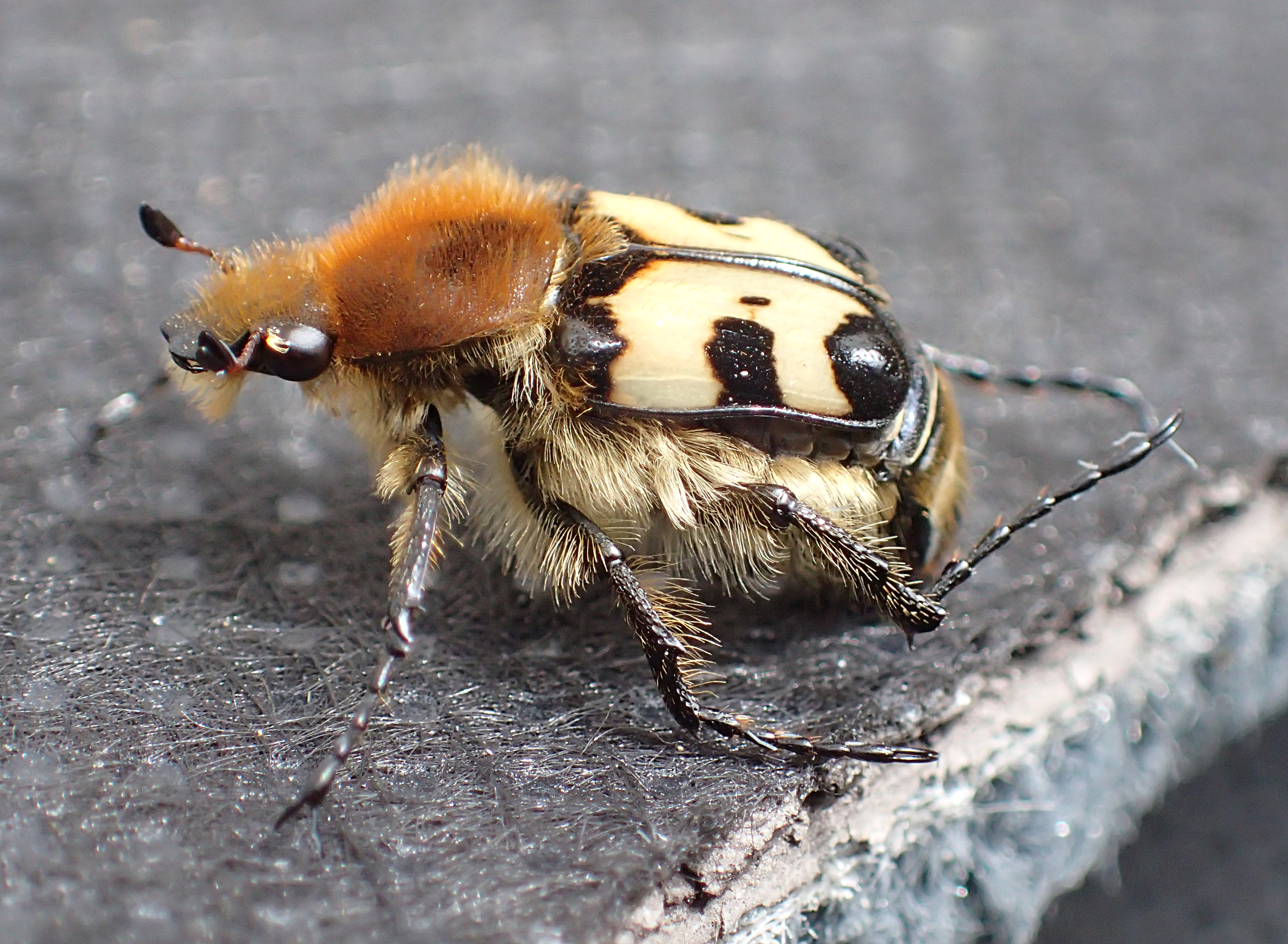
Side view

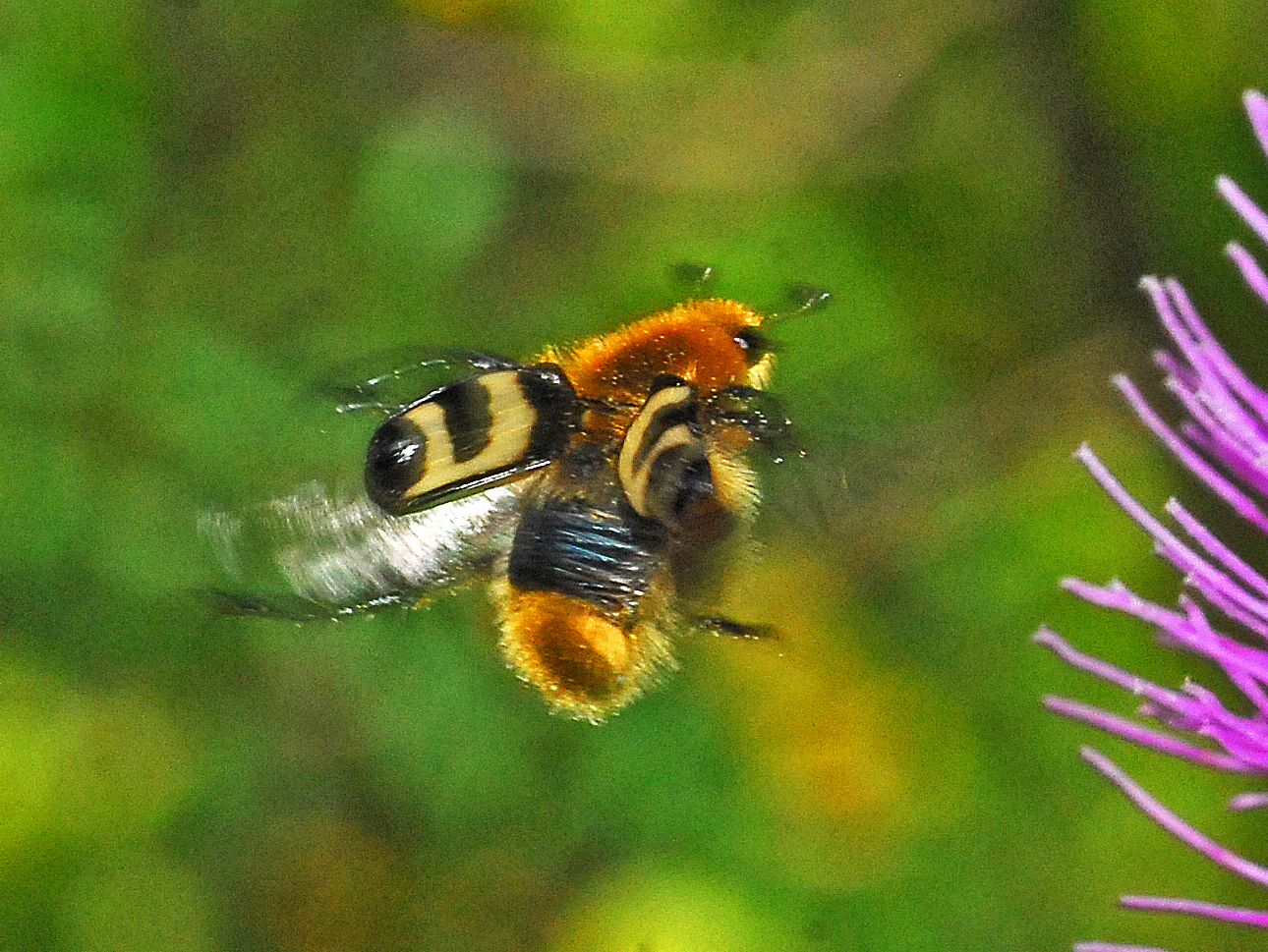
In flight

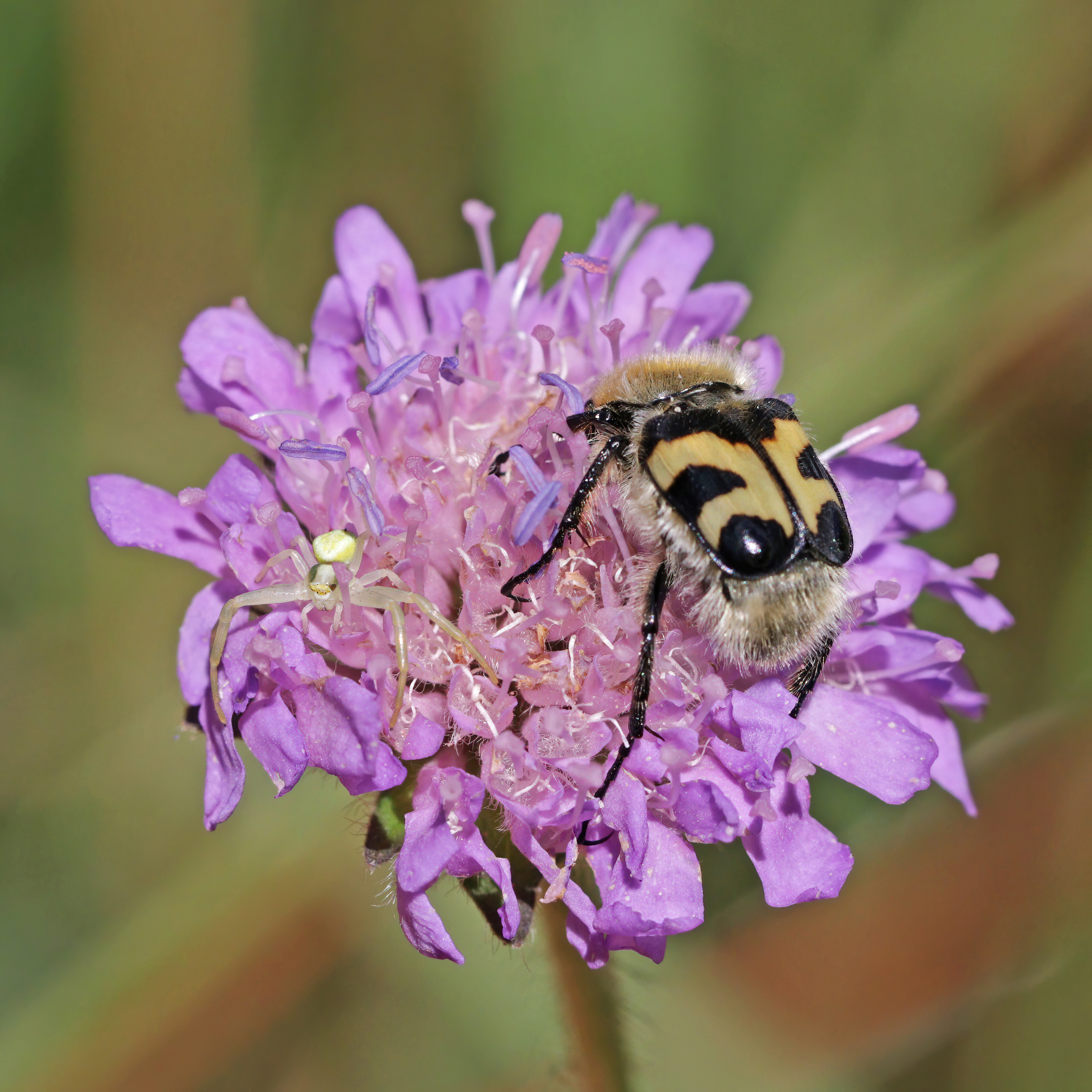
with Thomisidae, Croatia

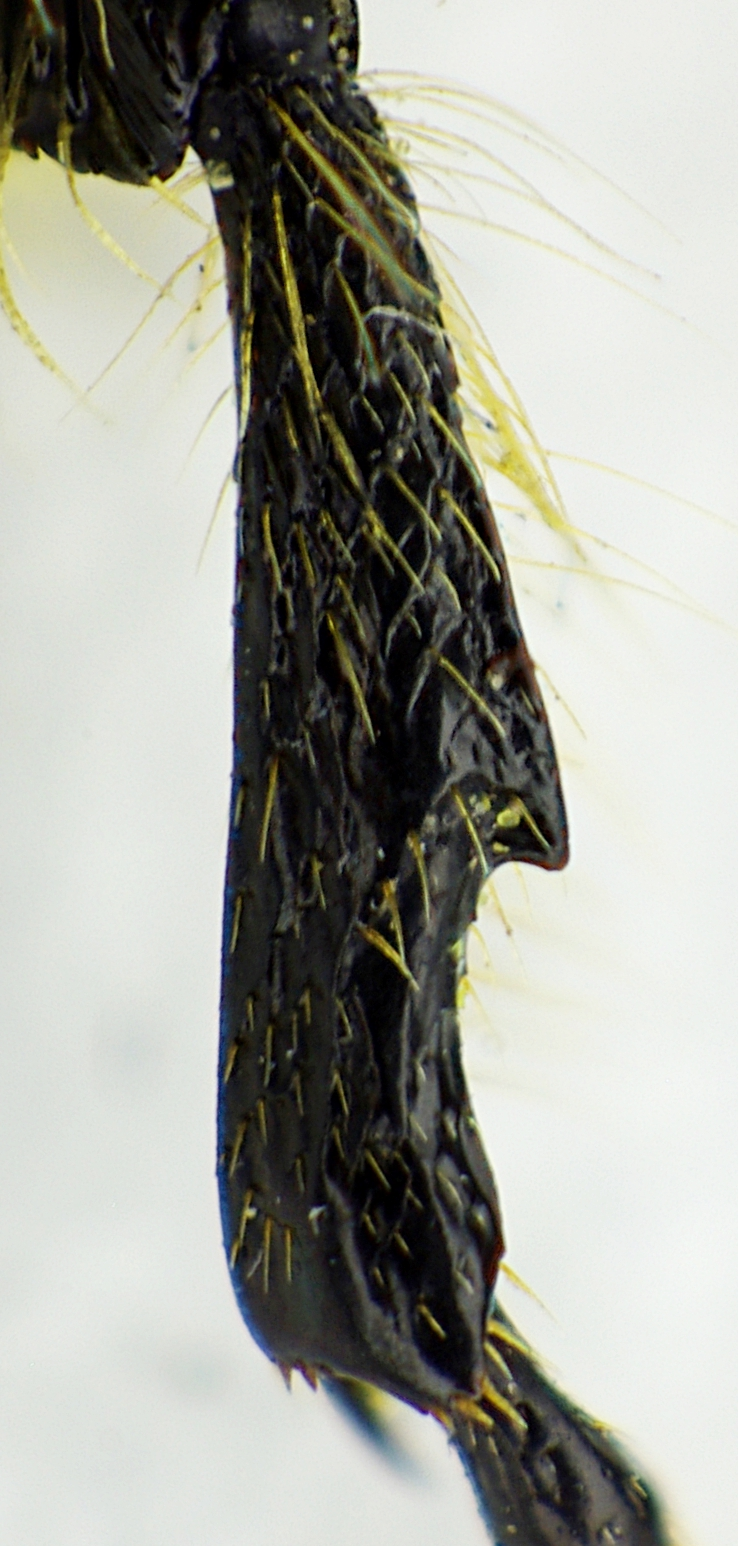
Encl. 1 - Mesotibia

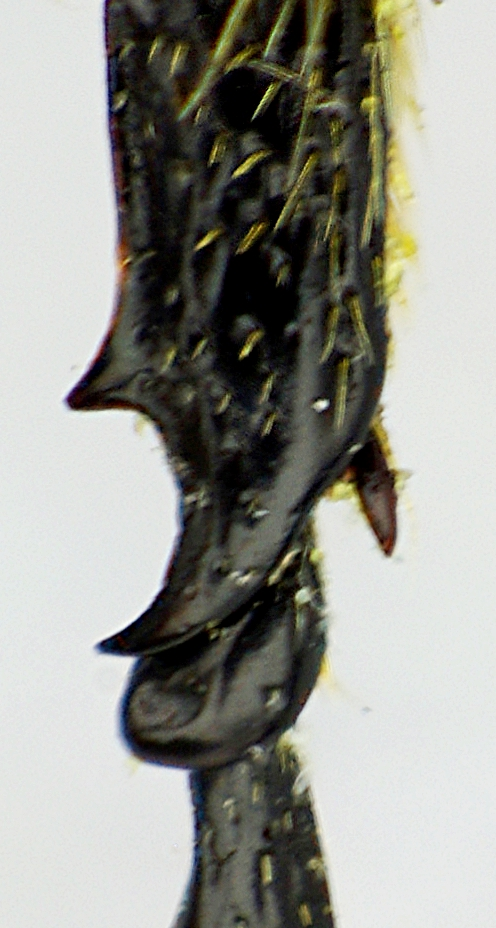
Encl. 2 - Tarsal segment

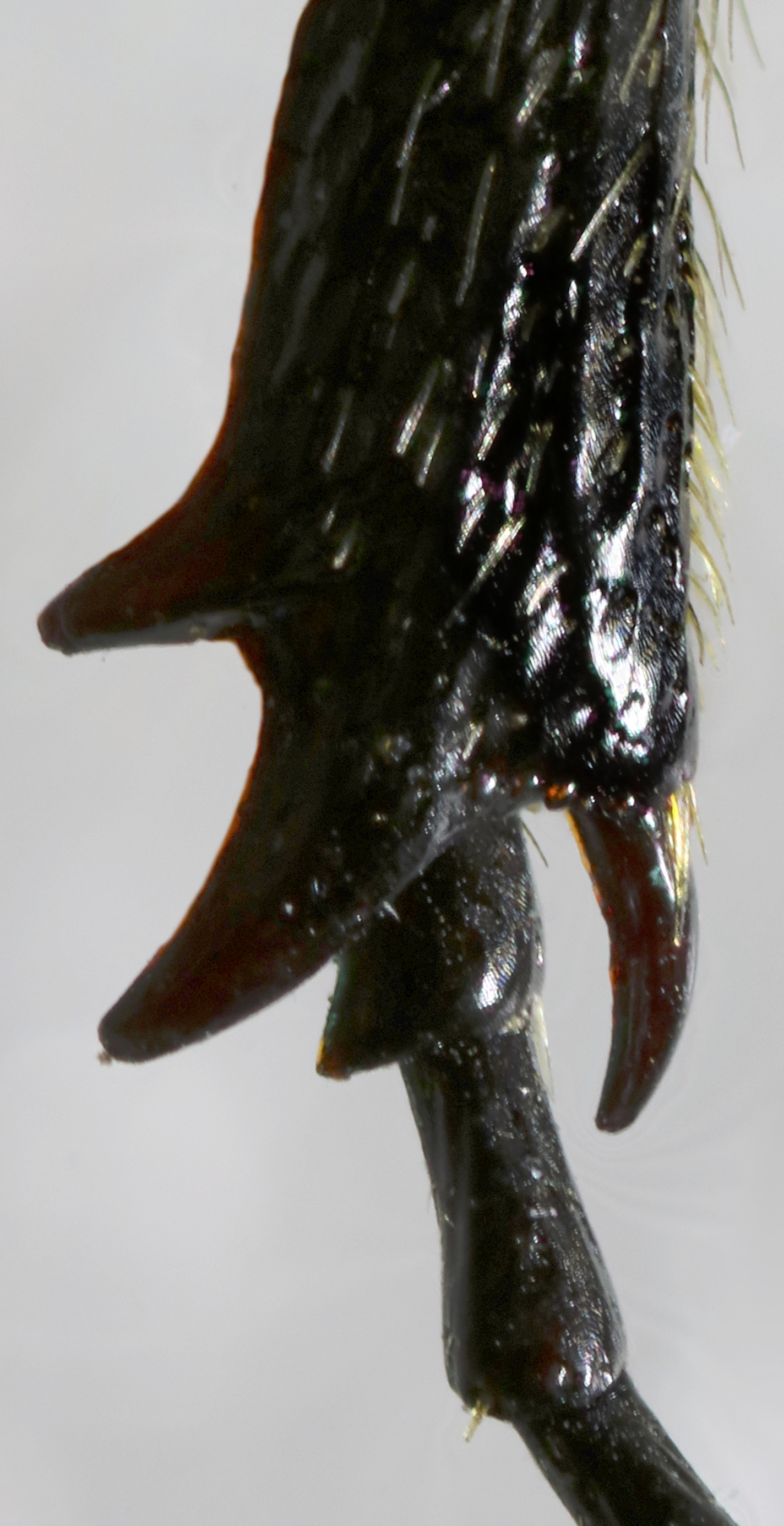
Encl. 3 - Tarsal segment

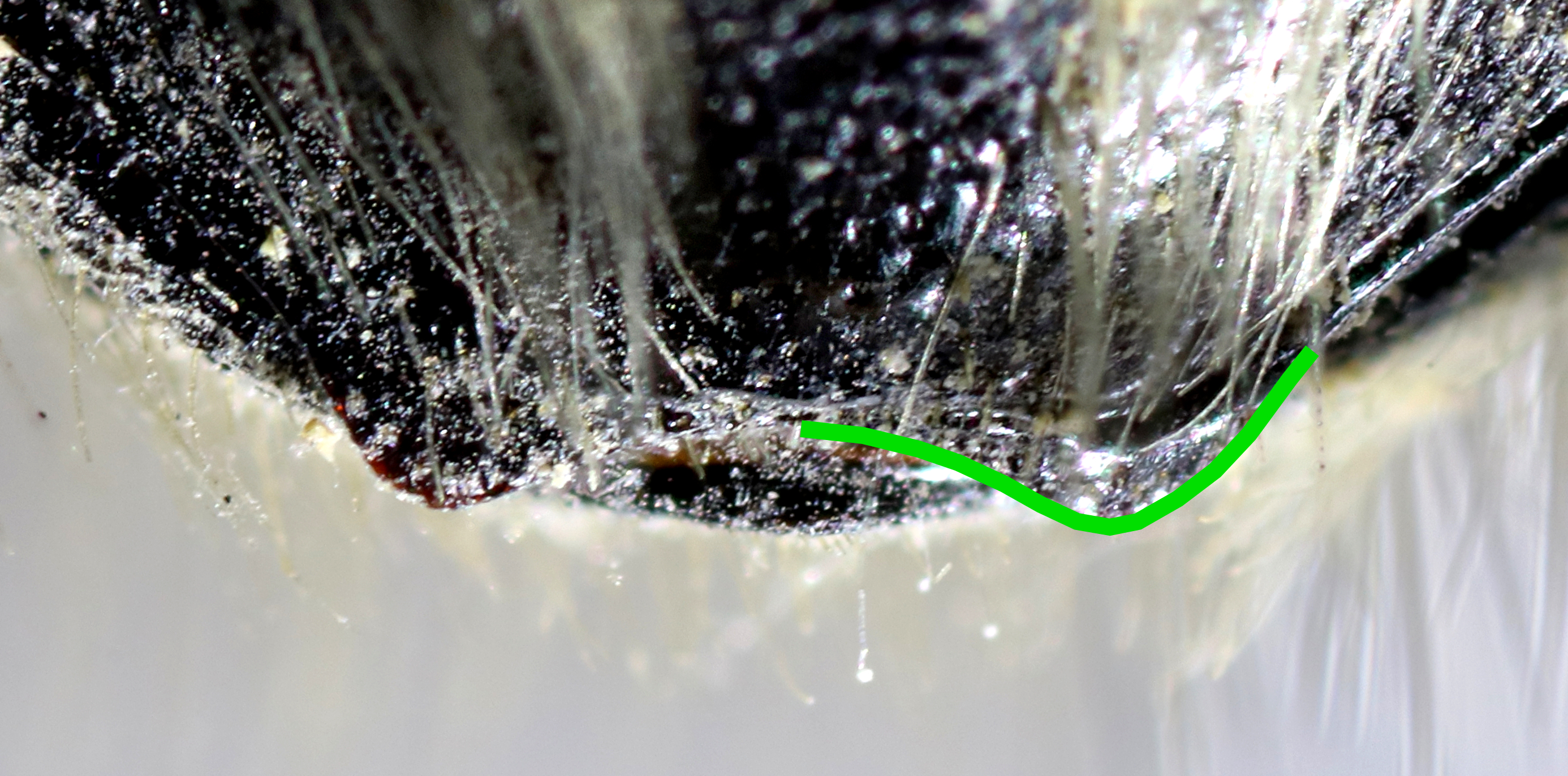
Encl. 4 - End of the pygidium

== Bibliography ==
- This article has been expanded using, inter alia, material based on a translation of an article from the Deutsch Wikipedia, by the same name.
- Svatopluk Bílý, Alena Čepická: Käfer. Artia-Verlag, Prag 1990, ISBN 3-7684-2929-6.
- Michael Chinery: Pareys Buch der Insekten. Ein Feldführer der europäischen Insekten. Verlag Paul Parey, Hamburg/Berlin 2004, ISBN 3-440-09969-5.
- Bernhard Klausnitzer: Käfer. Nikol Verlagsgesellschaft, Hamburg 2005, ISBN 3-937872-15-9.
- Jiři Zahradnik et al.: Käfer Mittel- und Nordwesteuropas. Parey, Berlin 1985, ISBN 3-490-27118-1.
