= Alefabad =

Alefabad الف اباد
- Village
- Location within Iran
- Coordinates: 38°48′10″N 46°17′51″E
- Country: Iran
- Province: East Azerbaijan
- County: Jolfa
- Bakhsh: Siah Rud
- Rural District: Nowjeh Mehr

Population (2006)
  - Total: 15
- Time zone: UTC+3:30 (IRST)
  - Summer (DST): UTC+4:30 (IRDT)

Alefabad (Persian: الف اباد, also Romanized as Alefābād) is a village in Nowjeh Mehr Rural District, Siah Rud District, Jolfa County, East Azerbaijan Province, Iran. At the 2006 census, its population was 15, in 4 families.
