= Nurduz =

Nurduz نوردوز
- Village
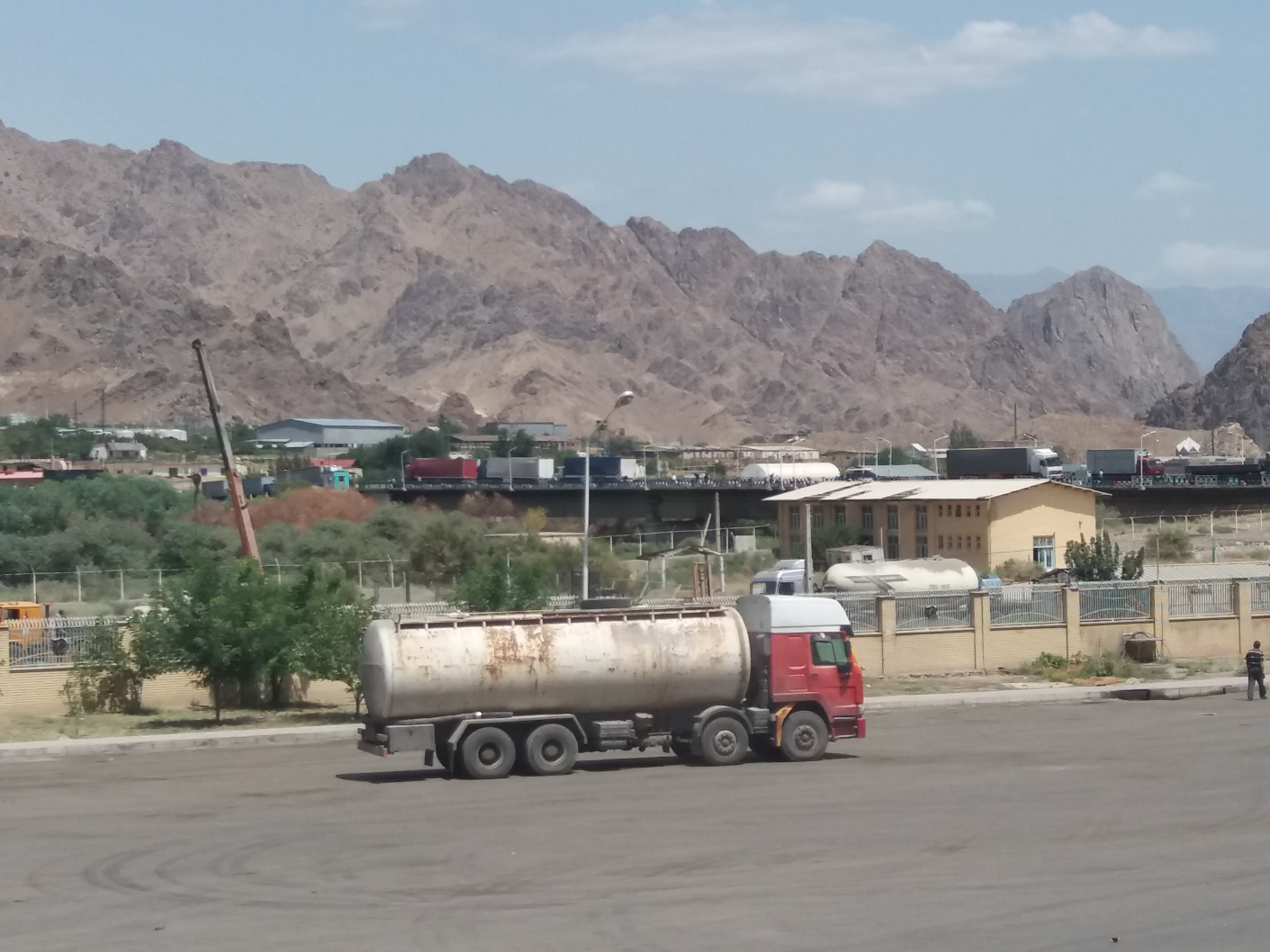
- border at Nurduz

- Location within Iran
- Coordinates: 38°50′19″N 46°12′26″E
- Country: Iran
- Province: East Azerbaijan
- County: Jolfa
- Bakhsh: Siah Rud
- Rural District: Nowjeh Mehr

Population (2006)
  - Total: 14
- Time zone: UTC+3:30 (IRST)
  - Summer (DST): UTC+4:30 (IRDT)

Nurduz (Persian: نوردوز, also Romanized as Nūrdūz) is a village in Nowjeh Mehr Rural District, Siah Rud District, Jolfa County, East Azerbaijan Province, Iran. At the 2006 census, its population was 14, in 4 families. It is situated near Iran's sole border crossing with Armenia. The Armenian town of Agarak is located right across the Aras.
