= Nazar Kandi =

Nazar Kandi نظركندي
- Village
- Location within Iran
- Coordinates: 38°49′34″N 46°14′04″E
- Country: Iran
- Province: East Azerbaijan
- County: Jolfa
- Bakhsh: Siah Rud
- Rural District: Nowjeh Mehr

Population (2006)
  - Total: 111
- Time zone: UTC+3:30 (IRST)
  - Summer (DST): UTC+4:30 (IRDT)

Nazar Kandi (Persian: نظركندي, also Romanized as Naz̧ar Kandī) is a village in Nowjeh Mehr Rural District, Siah Rud District, Jolfa County, East Azerbaijan Province, Iran. At the 2006 census, its population was 111, in 28 families.
