= Mianeh-ye Kord Ahmad =

Mianeh-ye Kord Ahmad میانه کرداحمد
- Village
- Location within Iran
- Coordinates: 38°49′47″N 46°14′19″E
- Country: Iran
- Province: East Azerbaijan
- County: Jolfa
- Bakhsh: Siah Rud
- Rural District: Nowjeh Mehr

Population (2006)
  - Total: 43
- Time zone: UTC+3:30 (IRST)
  - Summer (DST): UTC+4:30 (IRDT)

Mianeh-ye Kord Ahmad (Persian: میانه کرداحمد, also Romanized as Mīāneh-ye Kord Aḩmad; also known as Mīāneh) is a village in Nowjeh Mehr Rural District, Siah Rud District, Jolfa County, East Azerbaijan Province, Iran. At the 2006 census, its population was 43, in 12 families.
