= Qulan (disambiguation) =

Qulan may refer to:

Iran

- Qulan (Persian: قولان), a village Nowjeh Mehr Rural District, Jolfa County, East Azerbaijan Province.
- Qulan, Ahar (Persian: گولان), a village in Dodangeh Rural District, Ahar County, East Azerbaijan Province.

China

- Qulan, Hengyang (Chinese: 曲兰镇), a town of Hengyang County, Hunan province.
