= Aqan =

Aqan اعقان
- Village
- Location within Iran
- Coordinates: 38°48′00″N 46°23′00″E
- Country: Iran
- Province: East Azerbaijan
- County: Jolfa
- Bakhsh: Siah Rud
- Rural District: Nowjeh Mehr

Population (2006)
  - Total: 23
- Time zone: UTC+3:30 (IRST)
  - Summer (DST): UTC+4:30 (IRDT)

Aqan (Persian: اعقان, also Romanized as A‘qān; also known as Aghān; in Armenian: Աղաղան) is a village in Nowjeh Mehr Rural District, Siah Rud District, Jolfa County, East Azerbaijan Province, Iran. At the 2006 census, its population was 23, in 5 families.
