= Qeshlaq-e Aramaneh =

Qeshlaq-e Aramaneh قشلاق ارامنه
- Village
- Location within Iran
- Coordinates: 38°49′00″N 46°29′00″E
- Country: Iran
- Province: East Azerbaijan
- County: Jolfa
- Bakhsh: Siah Rud
- Rural District: Nowjeh Mehr

Population (2006)
  - Total: 52
- Time zone: UTC+3:30 (IRST)
  - Summer (DST): UTC+4:30 (IRDT)

Qeshlaq-e Aramaneh (Persian: قشلاق ارامنه, also romanized as Qeshlāq-e Arāmaneh) is a village in Nowjeh Mehr Rural District, Siah Rud District, Jolfa County, East Azerbaijan Province, Iran. At the 2006 census, its population was 52, in 9 families. There was an Armenian community in the village in the early 20th century. The population of the village was mostly Armenian before the Armenian genocide took place. An ancient and historical Armenian church is located in the village.
