= Pahnavar =

Pahnavar or Pehnavar or Pahnvar (Persian: پهناور), also rendered as Pahnevar, may refer to:

- Pahnavar, East Azerbaijan
- Pahnavar, Hamadan
- Pahnavar, Mazandaran
