= Telkari =

Telkari تلكري
- Village
- Location within Iran
- Coordinates: 38°47′35″N 46°16′07″E
- Country: Iran
- Province: East Azerbaijan
- County: Jolfa
- Bakhsh: Siah Rud
- Rural District: Nowjeh Mehr

Population (2006)
  - Total: 132
- Time zone: UTC+03:30 (IRST)
  - Summer (DST): UTC+04:30 (IRDT)

Telkari (Persian: تلكري, also Romanized as Telkarī; also known as Tīlkarī) is a village in Nowjeh Mehr Rural District, Siah Rud District, Jolfa County, East Azerbaijan province, Iran. At the 2006 census, its population was 132, in 27 families.
