= Aniq =

Aniq انيق
- Village
- Location within Iran
- Coordinates: 38°49′14″N 46°22′15″E
- Country: Iran
- Province: East Azerbaijan
- County: Jolfa
- Bakhsh: Siah Rud
- Rural District: Nowjeh Mehr

Population (2006)
  - Total: 170
- Time zone: UTC+03:30 (IRST)
  - Summer (DST): UTC+04:30 (IRDT)

Aniq (Persian: انيق, also Romanized as Anīq and Annīq; also known as Anekh, Aneq, Anigh, Anīkh, Kochev’ye Anekho, and Maḩall-e-Chādor Neshīnī) is a village in Nowjeh Mehr Rural District, Siah Rud District, Jolfa County, East Azerbaijan Province, Iran. At the 2006 census, its population was 170, in 41 families.
