= Armenia–Iran border =

International border

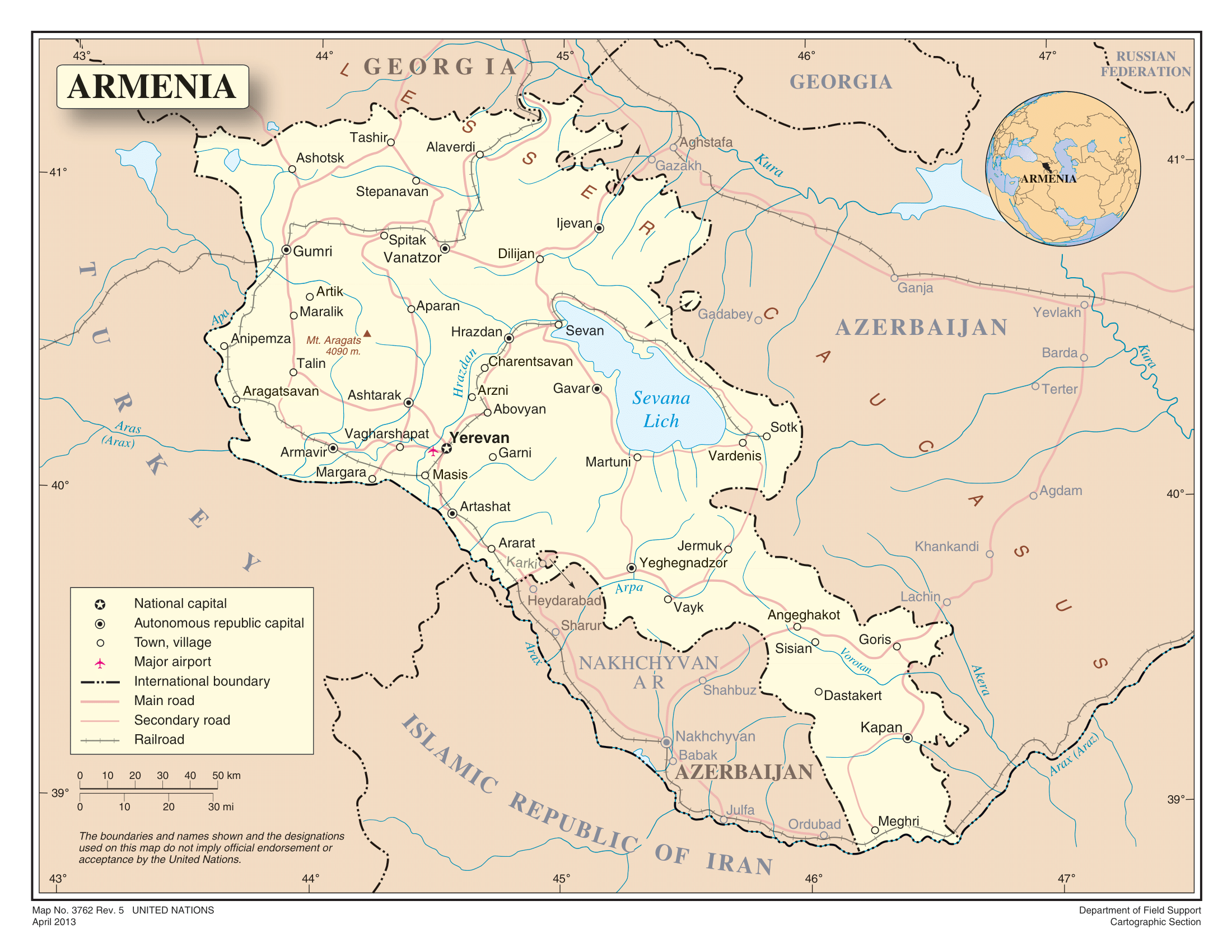
Map of Armenia, with Iran to the south

Armenian and Iranian boundary markers

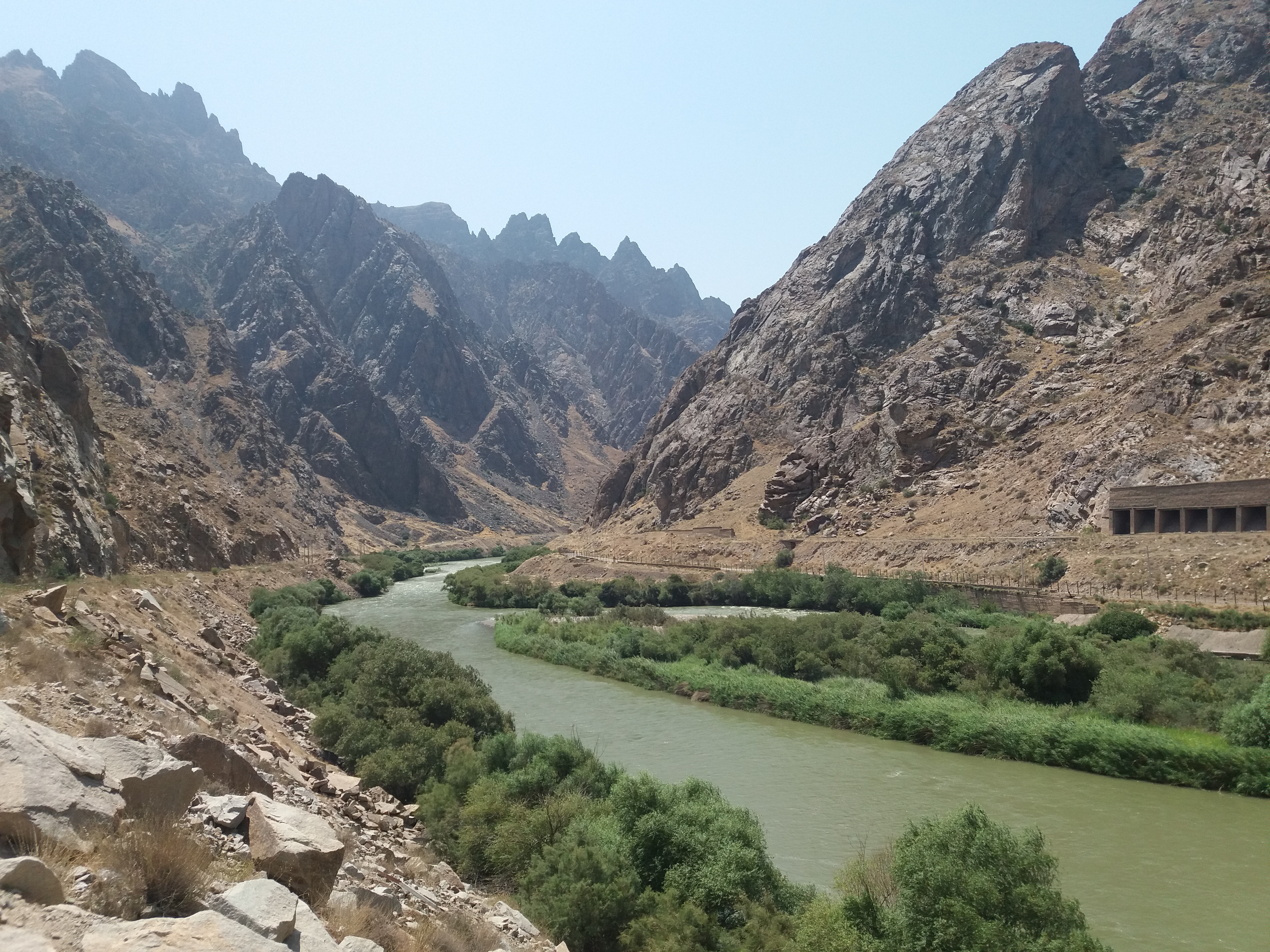
The border near Nurduz

The Armenia–Iran border (Armenian: Հայաստան–Իրան սահման, romanized: Hayastan–Iran sahman, Persian: مرز ارمنستان-ایران) is 44 km (27 mi) in length and runs from the tripoint with Azerbaijan’s Nakhchivan region in the west to the tripoint with Azerbaijan proper in the east. Between 1992 and 2025, the border was protected by guards of the Russian Federal Security Service after which protection was transferred to the Armenian Border Guard Service. On 9 May 2024, Russian Presidential spokesman Dmitry Peskov announced that Russian border guards will continue to serve on Armenia's borders with Iran and Turkey, at the request of the Armenian side. On 8 October 2024, Armenian prime minister's spokesperson Nazeli Baghdasaryan announced that the Armenian border guard troops will participate in protecting Armenia's borders with Iran and Turkey, together with the Russian border guard troops, starting from 1 January 2025.

== Description ==
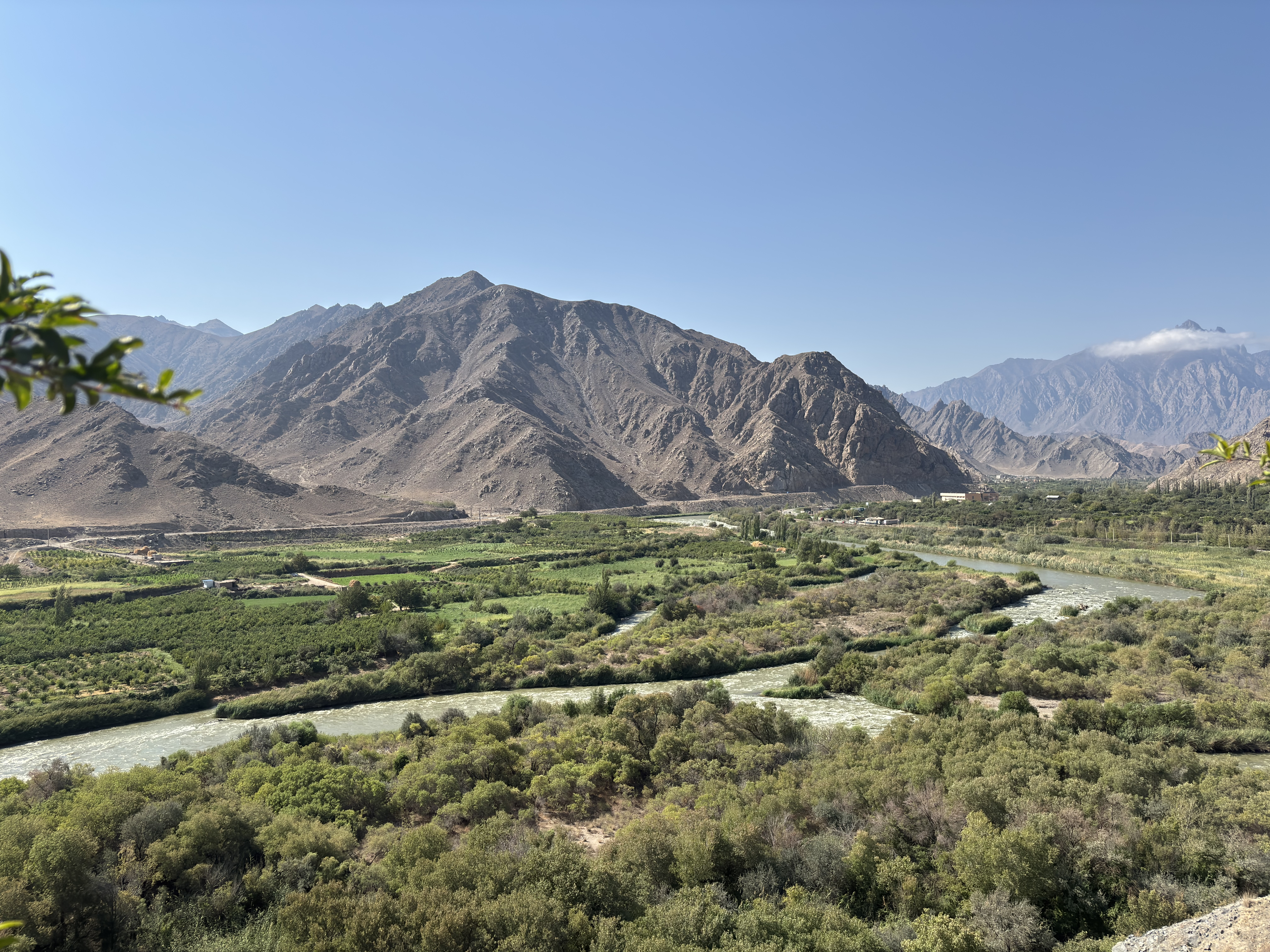

The border starts in the west, at the western tripoint with Nakhchivan, Azerbaijan, and runs along the Aras river to the eastern Azerbaijan tripoint. East of this, the border continues along the Aras eastwards.

== History ==
During the 19th century the Caucasus region was contested between the declining Ottoman Empire, Persia and Russia, which was expanding southwards. By the Russo-Persian War (1804–1813) and the subsequent Treaty of Gulistan, Russia acquired the bulk of what is now Azerbaijan and parts of Armenia; a border was drawn along the Aras river which is the modern border between Iran and Azerbaijan (excluding the Nakhchivan section) and Iran and Armenia. Following the Russo-Persian War (1826–1828) and the Treaty of Turkmenchay, Persia was forced to cede Nakhchivan and the rest of Armenia; the Aras was extended as the border up to the Ottoman tripoint, thus finalising what would become the Azerbaijan-Iran border.

During the First World War, Russian Communists staged a successful revolution in 1917, whilst the peoples of the southern Caucasus had declared the Transcaucasian Democratic Federative Republic in 1918. Internal disagreements led to Georgia leaving the federation in May 1918, followed shortly thereafter by Armenia and Azerbaijan. In 1920, Russia's Red Army invaded Azerbaijan and Armenia, ending the independence of both, followed shortly thereafter by Georgia. All three states were incorporated into the Transcaucasian SFSR within the USSR, before being separated in 1936. An Iran-USSR border convention in 1954 made some minor adjustment along the frontier in the Azeri sections of the border to Iran's benefit. On-the-ground demarcation then followed, with a final agreement being reached in 1957.

Following the collapse of the Soviet Union in 1991, Armenia gained independence and inherited its section of the Iran-Soviet Union border.

== Border crossings ==
The main crossing is at Nurduz-Agarak.

== Settlements near the border ==
=== Armenia ===
- Agarak
- Meghri
- Alvank
- Shvanidzor

=== Iran ===
- Duzal
- Qulan
- Kordasht
- Marzabad

== See also ==
- Armenia–Iran relations
