= Masen (disambiguation) =

Masen is a village in Iran.

Masen may also refer to:

- Ulu Masen, a tropical rainforest in Aceh, Indonesia
- Masen, the acronym for the Moroccan Agency for Sustainable Energy
- Masen Davis (born 1971), an American transgender rights activist
- ません, a suffix to indicate the polite negative form of a verb in Japanese verb conjugation

== See also ==
- Mesen, Iran (disambiguation)
