= Holaq =

Village in East Azerbaijan province, Iran

Holaq Persian: هلق
- Village
- Location within Iran
- Coordinates: 38°47′03″N 45°55′02″E
- Country: Iran
- Province: East Azerbaijan
- County: Jolfa
- District: Siah Rud
- Rural District: Dizmar-e Gharbi

Population (2016)
  - Total: 297
- Time zone: UTC+3:30 (IRST)

Holaq (Persian: هلق) (Note: Also known as Halagh, Holīq, Khūlīk, and Khulyak) is a village in Dizmar-e Gharbi Rural District of Siah Rud District in Jolfa County, East Azerbaijan province, Iran.

== Demographics ==
=== Population ===
At the time of the 2006 National Census, the village's population was 413 in 117 households. The following census in 2011 counted 290 people in 99 households. The 2016 census measured the population of the village as 297 people in 110 households.
