= Namnaq =

Namnaq نمنق
- Village
- Location within Iran
- Coordinates: 38°48′33″N 46°28′10″E
- Country: Iran
- Province: East Azerbaijan
- County: Jolfa
- Bakhsh: Siah Rud
- Rural District: Nowjeh Mehr

Population (2006)
  - Total: 102
- Time zone: UTC+3:30 (IRST)
  - Summer (DST): UTC+4:30 (IRDT)

Namnaq (Persian: نمنق, also Romanized as Namanaq and Namenaq; also known as Namangh, Namīneh, Namna, and Namnya) is a village in Nowjeh Mehr Rural District, Siah Rud District, Jolfa County, East Azerbaijan Province, Iran. At the 2006 census, its population was 102, in 31 families.
