= Vediq =

Village in East Azerbaijan province, Iran

Vediq Persian: وديق
- Village
- Location within Iran
- Coordinates: 38°42′53″N 45°59′06″E
- Country: Iran
- Province: East Azerbaijan
- County: Jolfa
- District: Siah Rud
- Rural District: Dizmar-e Gharbi

Population (2016)
  - Total: 60
- Time zone: UTC+3:30 (IRST)

Vediq (Persian: وديق) (Note: Also romanized as Vedīq) is a village in Dizmar-e Gharbi Rural District of Siah Rud District in Jolfa County, East Azerbaijan province, Iran.

== Demographics ==
=== Population ===
At the time of the 2006 National Census, the village's population was 43 in 19 households. The following census in 2011 counted 38 people in 20 households. The 2016 census measured the population of the village as 60 people in 23 households.
