= Komar, Iran =

Komar (Persian: كمار), also rendered as Kuh Mar and Qamar, in Iran, may refer to:

- Komar-e Olya
- Komar-e Sofla
