= Qareh Daraq, East Azerbaijan =

Qareh Daraq قره درق
- Village
- Location within Iran
- Coordinates: 38°50′00″N 46°21′00″E
- Country: Iran
- Province: East Azerbaijan
- County: Jolfa
- Bakhsh: Siah Rud
- Rural District: Nowjeh Mehr

Population (2006)
  - Total: 14
- Time zone: UTC+3:30 (IRST)
  - Summer (DST): UTC+4:30 (IRDT)

Qareh Daraq (Persian: قره درق; also known as Ghareh Daragh, Qara Darreh, Qareh Dareh, and Qareh Darreh) is a village in Nowjeh Mehr Rural District, Siah Rud District, Jolfa County, East Azerbaijan Province, Iran. At the 2006 census, its population was 14, in 4 families.
