= Nowjeh Mehr =

Village in East Azerbaijan province, Iran

Nowjeh Mehr Persian: نوجه مهر
- Village
- Location within Iran
- Coordinates: 38°50′19″N 46°13′24″E
- Country: Iran
- Province: East Azerbaijan
- County: Jolfa
- District: Siah Rud
- Rural District: Nowjeh Mehr

Population (2016)
  - Total: 515
- Time zone: UTC+3:30 (IRST)

Nowjeh Mehr (Persian: نوجه مهر) (Note: Also known as Nowj Mehr) is a village in, and the capital of, Nowjeh Mehr Rural District in Siah Rud District of Jolfa County, East Azerbaijan province, Iran.

== Demographics ==
=== Population ===
At the time of the 2006 National Census, the village's population was 436 in 102 households. The following census in 2011 counted 397 people in 111 households. The 2016 census measured the population of the village as 515 people in 157 households.
