= Pahnavar, East Azerbaijan =

Pahnavar پهناور
- Village
- Location within Iran
- Coordinates: 38°48′45″N 46°14′30″E
- Country: Iran
- Province: East Azerbaijan
- County: Jolfa
- Bakhsh: Siah Rud
- Rural District: Nowjeh Mehr

Population (2006)
  - Total: 118
- Time zone: UTC+3:30 (IRST)
  - Summer (DST): UTC+4:30 (IRDT)

Pahnavar (Persian: پهناور, also Romanized as Pahnāvar, Pehnāvar, and Pahnvar; also known as Pahnāvar Kord Aḩmad and Pegnarar) is a village in Nowjeh Mehr Rural District, Siah Rud District, Jolfa County, East Azerbaijan Province, Iran. At the 2006 census, its population was 118, in 29 families.
