= Pir Bolagh, Jolfa =

Pir Bulaq پيربلاغ
- Village
- Location within Iran
- Coordinates: 38°51′37″N 46°20′37″E
- Country: Iran
- Province: East Azerbaijan
- County: Jolfa
- Bakhsh: Siah Rud
- Rural District: Nowjeh Mehr

Population (2006)
  - Total: 17
- Time zone: UTC+3:30 (IRST)
  - Summer (DST): UTC+4:30 (IRDT)

Pir Bolagh (Persian: پيربلاغ, also Romanized as Pīr Bolāgh; also known as Pir Bulāq and Pīr Bulāqī) is a village in Nowjeh Mehr Rural District, Siah Rud District, Jolfa County, East Azerbaijan Province, Iran. At the 2006 census, its population was 17, in 4 families. In Azerbaijani Turkish Pir is used to holy fountain and Bulaq means fountain, So PirBulaq means a fountain named Pir. Early inhabitants of Pirbulaq were Malekzadeh Pribolaghi, Pourmohammad,... .
