= Oruj =

Oruj اروج
- Village
- Location within Iran
- Coordinates: 38°51′32″N 46°25′16″E
- Country: Iran
- Province: East Azerbaijan
- County: Jolfa
- Bakhsh: Siah Rud
- Rural District: Nowjeh Mehr

Population (2006)
  - Total: 131
- Time zone: UTC+3:30 (IRST)
  - Summer (DST): UTC+4:30 (IRDT)

Oruj (Persian: اروج, also Romanized as Orūj; also known as Oruch, Orudzh, Owrūj, Ūroj, and Ūrūj) is a village in Nowjeh Mehr Rural District, Siah Rud District, Jolfa County, East Azerbaijan Province, Iran. At the 2006 census, its population was 131, in 32 families.
