= Geurutee =

Mountain in Aceh Province, Indonesia

Mount Geurutee
- Location within Sumatra

Highest point
- Elevation: 750 m (2,460 ft)
- Coordinates: 5°21′00″N 95°19′00″E

Geography
- Location: Aceh Jaya Regency, Aceh, Indonesia
- Parent range: Bukit Barisan

Geology
- Volcanic arc: Sunda Arc

Geurutee (Acehnese: Gunong Geurutee, Indonesian: Gunung Geurutee) is a mountain located on the border of Aceh Besar Regency and Aceh Jaya Regency, Aceh Province, Indonesia. This mountain has a height of about 750 meters above sea level. Although not a high mountain, the topography of Mount Geurutee is dominated by steep slopes covered in dense tropical forest, making it part of the Bukit Barisan ecosystem.

== Geology ==
Mount Geurutee is part of the Barisan Mountains geological system, which was formed by tectonic activity along the Great Sumatran fault. Its soil structure consists of old sedimentary and volcanic rocks, which support a tropical rainforest ecosystem. This area is a water catchment area that supports life in the surrounding area.

== Ecosystem and biodiversity ==
The mountain is part of the Ulu Masen Protected Forest, one of the important forest areas in Sumatra. This forest is a habitat for various types of endemic flora and fauna, including several endangered species, such as the Sumatran Tiger (Panthera tigris sumatrae) and the Sumatran Elephant (Elephas maximus sumatranus). Its ecological function is as a carbon sink and regulator of the hydrological cycle.

== History ==
In the oral tradition of the Acehnese people, this mountain has a close relationship with the struggle of the Acehnese people against Dutch colonialism. One story states that this mountain was a hiding place for Acehnese fighters during the Aceh War, where they fought against the Dutch with guerrilla tactics that relied on the difficult-to-reach natural terrain, including the sharp slopes of this mountain. Geurutee is also considered a symbol of the struggle and resilience of the Acehnese people.
