= Komar-e Olya =

Village in East Azerbaijan province, Iran

Komar-e Olya Persian: كمارعليا
- Village
- Location within Iran
- Coordinates: 38°42′12″N 46°02′24″E
- Country: Iran
- Province: East Azerbaijan
- County: Jolfa
- District: Siah Rud
- Rural District: Dizmar-e Gharbi

Population (2016)
  - Total: 370
- Time zone: UTC+3:30 (IRST)

Komar-e Olya (Persian: كمارعليا) (Note: Also romanized as Kamar Olya, Komār ‘Olyā, and Komār-e ‘Olyā; also known as Kamar Bālā, Komār, Komar Bālā, Komār-e Bālā, Kūh Mār, Yukāri Qamar, Yūkhārī Gomār, Yukhari Kemar, and Yūkhārī Komār) is a village in Dizmar-e Gharbi Rural District of Siah Rud District in Jolfa County, East Azerbaijan province, Iran.

== Demographics ==
=== Population ===
At the time of the 2006 National Census, the village's population was 571 in 135 households. The following census in 2011 counted 442 people in 111 households. The 2016 census measured the population of the village as 370 people in 119 households.
