= Masan (disambiguation) =

Masan is an administrative region of Changwon, South Korea and was formerly an independent city.

Masan can also refer to:

- Masan (Gangwon), a mountain in South Korea
- Masan (pastry), a Tibean tsampa pastry with brown sugar
- Masan Group, a Vietnamese conglomerate company

== See also ==
- Masaan, 2015 Indian film
- Masan, Iran (disambiguation)
