= Abulgasim Nabati =

Iranian Azerbaijani poet

Seyid Abulgasim Nabati
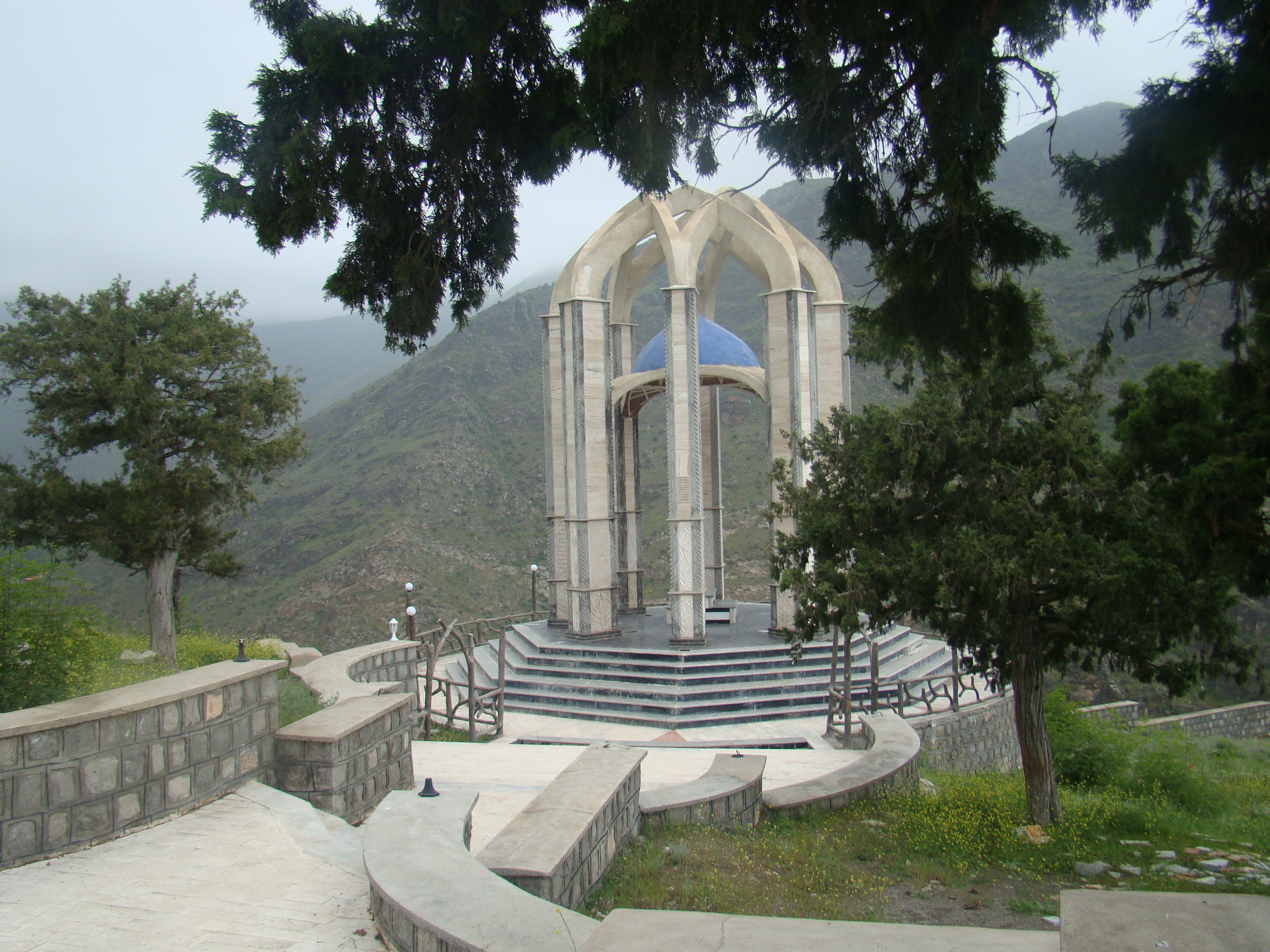
- Tomb of Seyid Abulgasim Nabati
- Born: 1812; Ushtibin, Jolfa, Iran
- Died: 1873 (aged 60–61); Ushtibin, Jolfa, Iran
- Occupation: Poet

Seyid Abulgasim Nabati (Persian: سید ابوالقاسم نباتی, Azerbaijani: Əbülqasım Nəbati, 1812–1873) was a 19th-century Iranian Azerbaijani poet.

Very little information about his life is known, that is not even accurate as to the family he belonged to. What is known for certain is that Nabati graduated from high school, spent his youth in Arasbaran, later visited the tomb of Sheikh Shahabaddin in Ahar, after which he returned to his native Ushtibin, where he lived until his death. After his death, his poems, not all of which were published during his lifetime, or even recorded, were performed by locals in songs.

He wrote in Azerbaijani and Persian. His first poem was published in Tabriz in 1845. Nabati poem written in Azerbaijani as quantitative metric ( araz ) and syllabic People, among his heritage present as Ruban, and gazal, dedicated to the chanting of the beauties of nature, human love, appeals to enjoy the pleasures of life. Nabati also wrote poetry and philosophy, in which the important topic was pantheism, although this part of his legacy is controversial : some of his works can be seen or Sufi mystic, some - even atheistic sentiments. In the poetic heritage Nabati had the influence of classical models as Eastern poetry, and folk art. The form of his poetry had some influence on the development of ashug verse.

== Notes ==
- Seyid Abulgasim Nabati
- Arif, M. Istoriia azerbaidzhanskoi literatury. Baku, 1971.
- Qasımzadə, F. XIX əsr Azərbaycan ədəbiyyatı tarixi. Baku, 1966.
