= Dibri =

Dibri may refer to:

- Dibri (biblical figure)
- Dibri, Iran, a village in East Azerbaijan Province, Iran
