= Qara Darreh =

Qara Darreh (Persian: قرادره) may refer to:

- Qara Darreh, Isfahan
- Qareh Daraq (disambiguation)
