= Misan =

Misan may refer to:

- Misan, Iran, a village in East Azerbaijan Province, Iran
- Misan Province, Iraq
- Misan football club, an Iraqi football team
- Igor Mišan (born 1990), Bosnian Serb footballer
- University of Misan, in Amarah, Maysan, Iraq
- Ministry of Health (Spain) (Ministerio de Sanidad or MISAN)
