= Pir Bolagh =

Pir Bolagh may refer to:

- Pir Bolagh, Jolfa, a village in Jolfa County, Iran
- Pir Bolagh, Ardabil, a village in Ardabil County, Iran
- Pirbulaq, a village in Azerbaijan
