= Mosan =

Mosan may refer to:

- any attribute of the Meuse (river) or Meuse valley area
- Mosan languages
- Mosan art
- Malin Moström, Swedish footballer
- Mosan, Iran (disambiguation), places in Iran
