= Duzal =

Village in East Azerbaijan province, Iran

Duzal Persian: دوزال
- Village
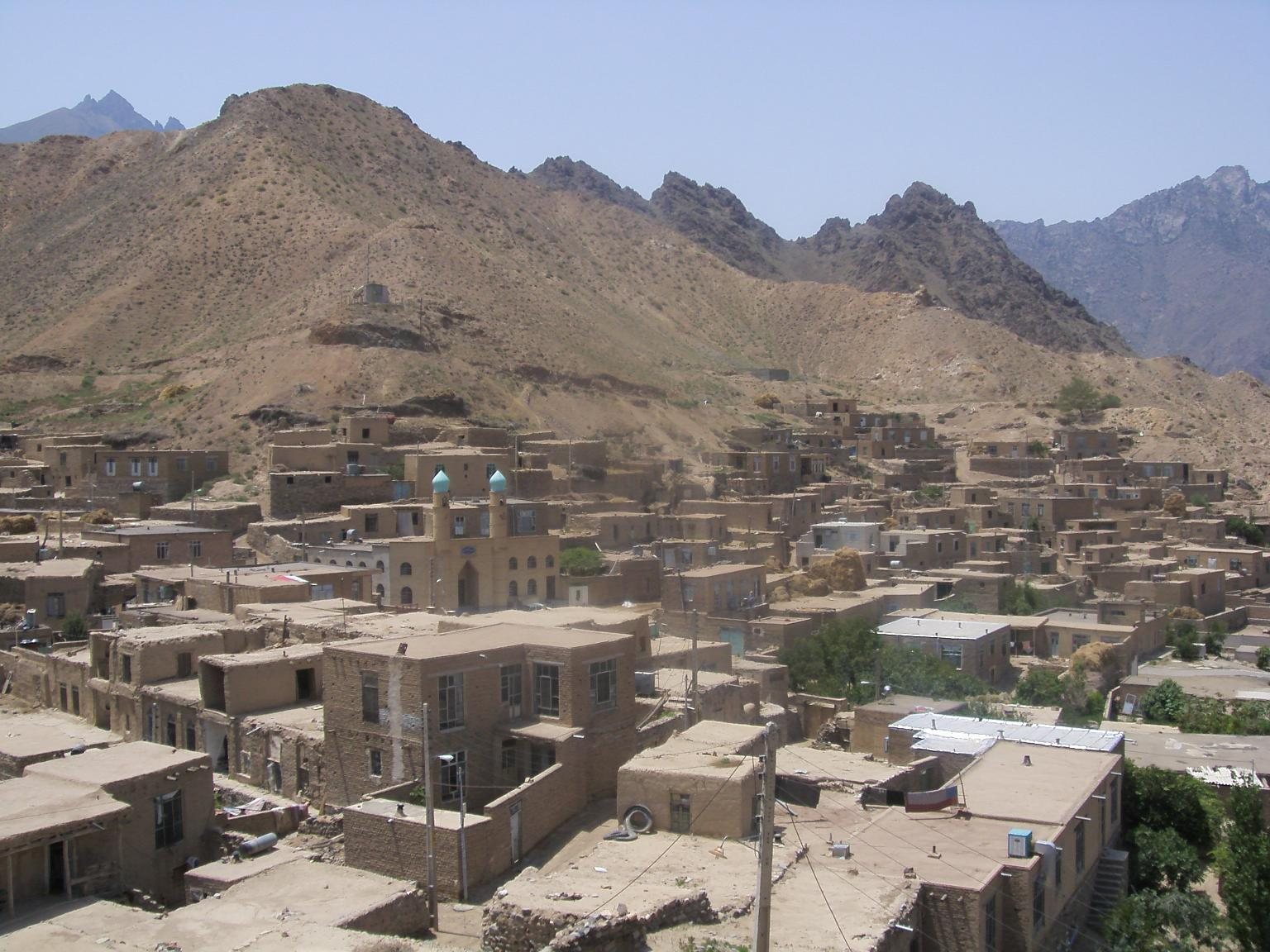
- The village of Duzal

- Location within Iran
- Coordinates: 38°51′35″N 46°13′42″E
- Country: Iran
- Province: East Azerbaijan
- County: Jolfa
- District: Siah Rud
- Rural District: Nowjeh Mehr

Population (2016)
  - Total: 532
- Time zone: UTC+3:30 (IRST)

Duzal (Persian: دوزال) (Note: Also romanized as Dūzāl; also known as Dozal) is a village in Nowjeh Mehr Rural District of Siah Rud District in Jolfa County, East Azerbaijan province, Iran.

== Demographics ==
=== Population ===
At the time of the 2006 National Census, the village's population was 496 in 111 households.

The following census in 2011 counted 545 people in 152 households.

The 2016 census measured the population of the village as 532 people in 165 households.

It was the most populous village in its rural district.

== Geographic ==
=== Location ===
This village is located on the banks of the Aras River and on the border with Armenia. Previously, this village was a subordinate of Dizmar, Arasbaran or Kharvana.

This village was the winter residence of Bayander Beg, ruler of Dizmar. The city of Kharvana was his summer residence. The village of Douzal is home to numerous shrines dating back to the Seljuk period, including "Imamzadeh Shoaib", which is located under the Douzal Tower. It is considered the most important historical monument of this village.

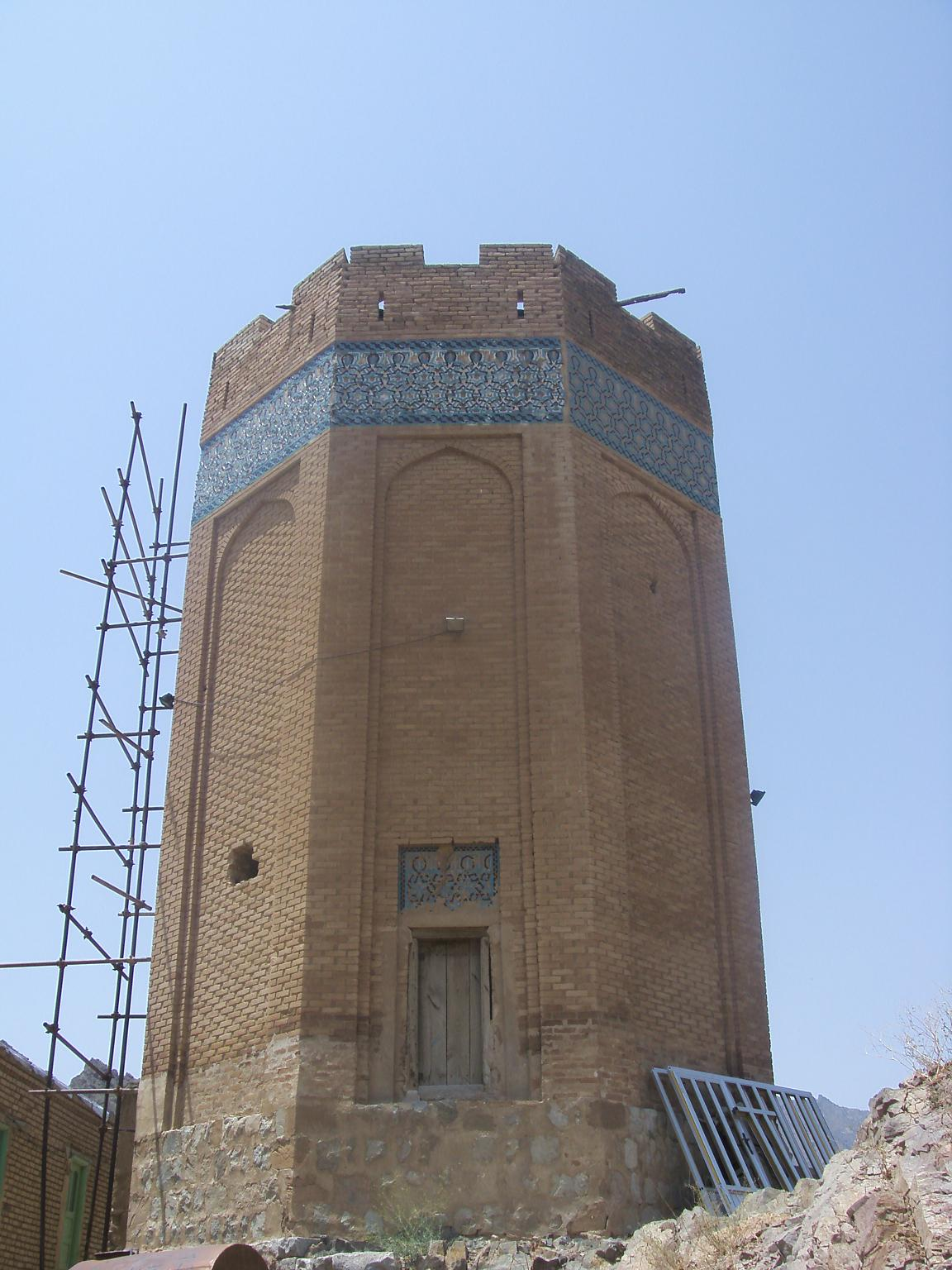
Duzal tower.
