= Kordasht =

Village in East Azerbaijan province, Iran

Kordasht Persian: كردشت
- Village
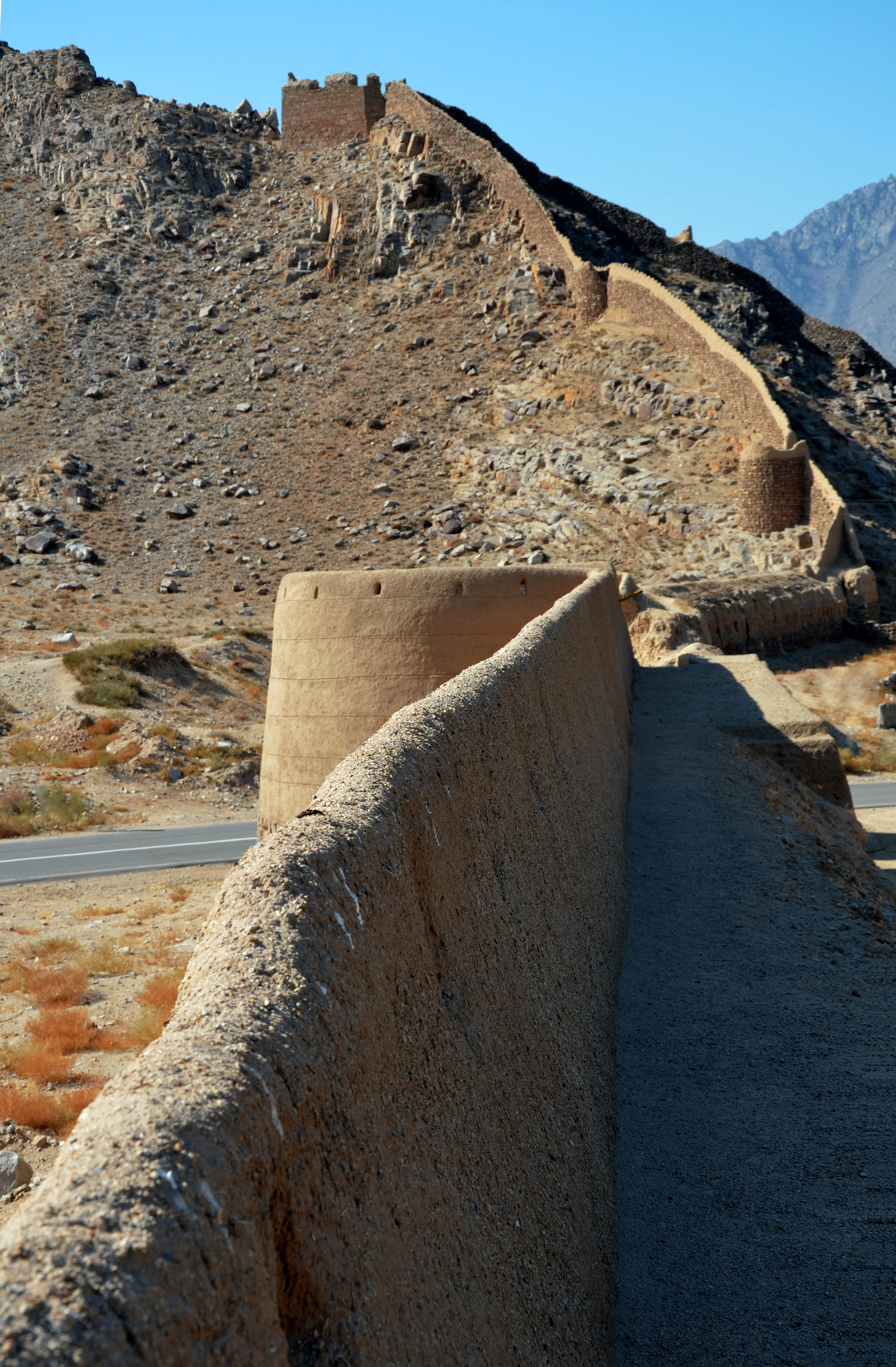
- Kordasht Castle

- Location within Iran
- Coordinates: 38°52′32″N 46°15′15″E
- Country: Iran
- Province: East Azerbaijan
- County: Jolfa
- District: Siah Rud
- Rural District: Nowjeh Mehr

Population (2016)
  - Total: 355
- Time zone: UTC+3:30 (IRST)

Kordasht (Persian: كردشت) (Note: Also known as Kūr Dasht) is a village in Nowjeh Mehr Rural District of Siah Rud District in Jolfa County, East Azerbaijan province, Iran.

== Demographics ==
=== Population ===
At the time of the 2006 National Census, the village's population was 420 in 103 households. The following census in 2011 counted 365 people in 104 households. The 2016 census measured the population of the village as 355 people in 103 households.

Kordasht Castle and Kordasht Hammam are located in this village.
