= Kordasht Castle =

Castle in East Azerbaijan Province, Iran

- قلعه کردشت
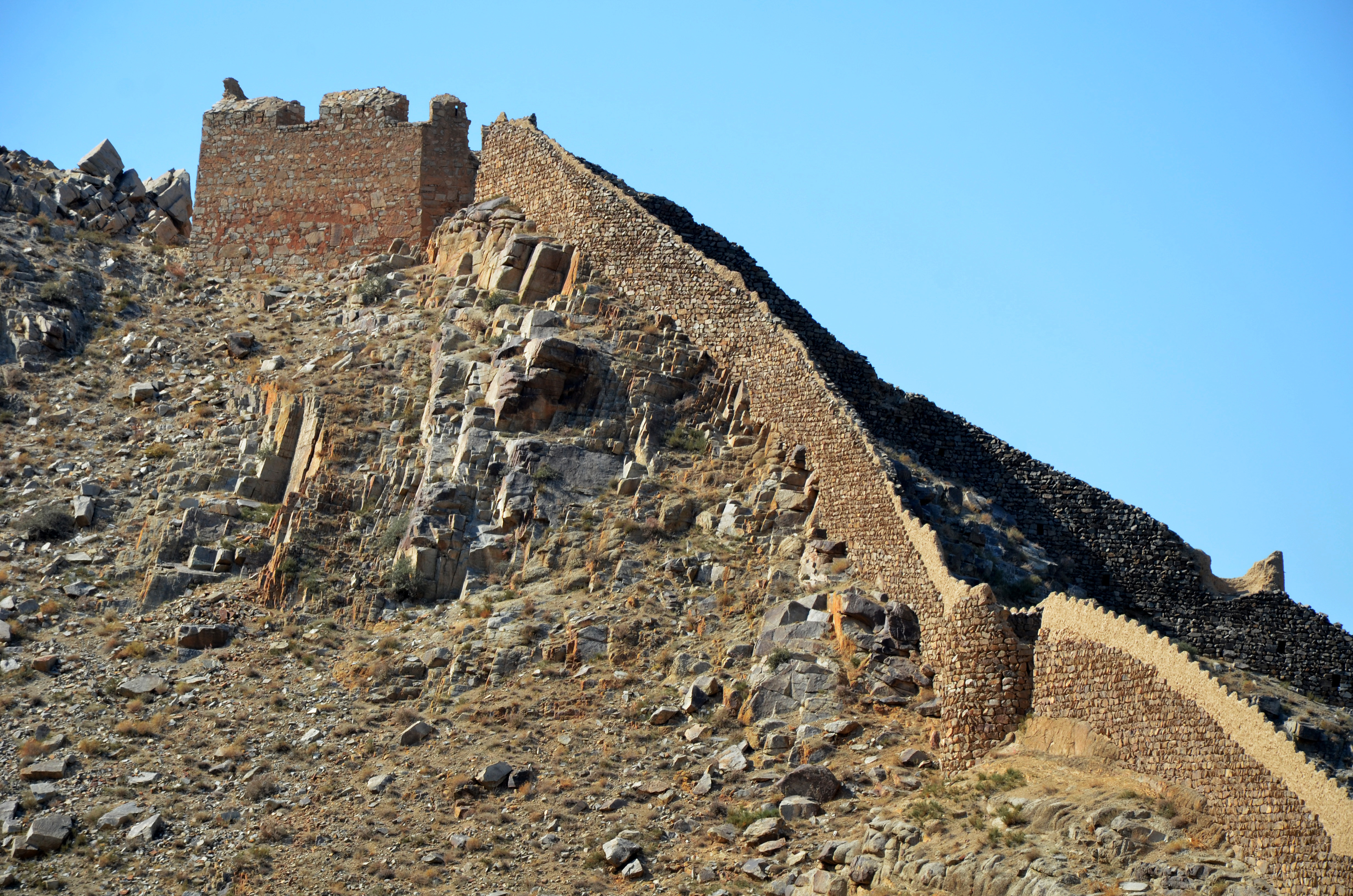

General information
- Type: Castle
- Location: Kordasht, Iran

Kordasht Castle (Persian: قلعه کردشت) is a historical castle located in Jolfa County in East Azerbaijan Province, The longevity of this fortress dates back to the Qajar dynasty.
