= Namna =

Namna may refer to:

- Namnå, a village in Norway
- Namnaq, a village in East Azerbaijan Province, Iran
- Namna language, one of the Nambu languages of Papua New Guinea
