= ROKS Masan =

ROKS Masan is the name of the following ships of the Republic of Korea Navy named for the city of Masan:

- ROKS Masan (AKL-909), loaned to Korea in 1956
- ROKS Masan (FF-955), an Ulsan-class frigate in commission 1985–2019, now a museum ship in Incheon

== See also ==
- Masan (disambiguation)
