= Mesan, East Azerbaijan =

Mesan مسن
- Village
- Location within Iran
- Coordinates: 38°52′52″N 46°26′32″E
- Country: Iran
- Province: East Azerbaijan
- County: Jolfa
- Bakhsh: Siah Rud
- Rural District: Nowjeh Mehr

Population (2006)
  - Total: 205
- Time zone: UTC+3:30 (IRST)
  - Summer (DST): UTC+4:30 (IRDT)

Mesan (Persian: مسن, also Romanized as Masan and Mosan; also known as Mīsan and Misan) is a village in Nowjeh Mehr Rural District, Siah Rud District, Jolfa County, East Azerbaijan Province, Iran. At the 2006 census, its population was 205, in 52 families.
