= Ushtibin =

Village in East Azerbaijan province, Iran

Ushtibin Persian: اوشتبين
- Village
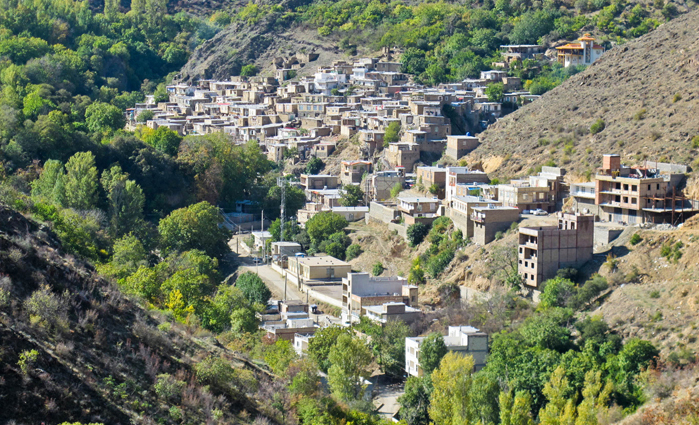
- The historical village of Ashtabin, which dates back to the Safavid period, is located in Jolfa County. This village, located on the border of the Aras River, is known as the Masuleh of Azerbaijan.

- Location within Iran
- Coordinates: 38°51′25″N 46°29′10″E
- Country: Iran
- Province: East Azerbaijan
- County: Jolfa
- District: Siah Rud
- Rural District: Nowjeh Mehr

Population (2016)
  - Total: 490
- Time zone: UTC+3:30 (IRST)

Ushtibin (Persian: اوشتبين) (Note: Also romanized as Ūshtobīn; also known as Oshtī”n, Oshtowbīn, Oshtūbīn, Uchtubin, and Ūshtowbīn) is a village in Nowjeh Mehr Rural District of Siah Rud District in Jolfa County, East Azerbaijan province, Iran.

== Demographics ==
=== Population ===
At the time of the 2006 National Census, the village's population was 653 in 145 households. The following census in 2011 counted 603 people in 150 households. The 2016 census measured the population of the village as 490 people in 132 households.
