= Komar-e Sofla =

Village in East Azerbaijan province, Iran

Komar-e Sofla Persian: كمارسفلي
- Village
- Location within Iran
- Coordinates: 38°42′12″N 46°01′09″E
- Country: Iran
- Province: East Azerbaijan
- County: Jolfa
- District: Siah Rud
- Rural District: Dizmar-e Gharbi

Population (2016)
  - Total: 664
- Time zone: UTC+3:30 (IRST)

Komar-e Sofla (Persian: كمارسفلي) (Note: Also romanized as Kamar Sofla, Komār Soflá, and Komār-e Soflá; also known as Kemar, Komār, Komār Pā’īn, Komār-e Pā’īn, Kūh Mar, and Qamar) is a village in Dizmar-e Gharbi Rural District of Siah Rud District in Jolfa County, East Azerbaijan province, Iran.

== Demographics ==
=== Population ===
At the time of the 2006 National Census, the village's population was 794 in 172 households. The following census in 2011 counted 789 people in 197 households. The 2016 census measured the population of the village as 664 people in 188 households.
