= Dizmar =

Dizmar (Persian: ديزمار) may refer to:

- Dizmar-e Gharbi Rural District
- Dizmar-e Markazi Rural District
- Dizmar-e Sharqi Rural District
