= Nabati (surname) =

Nabati is a surname. Notable people with the surname include:

- Abulgasim Nabati (1812–1873), Iranian-Azerbaijani poet
- Kiamran Nabati (born 194), Russian kickboxer
- Abu al-Abbas al-Nabati (1166–1239), Andalusian scientist and botanist

== See also ==
- Nabati
- Roghan Nabati Sari F.C.
