= Iri-ye Sofla =

Village in East Azerbaijan province, Iran

Iri-ye Sofla Persian: ايري سفلي
- Village
- Location within Iran
- Coordinates: 38°49′39″N 46°01′10″E
- Country: Iran
- Province: East Azerbaijan
- County: Jolfa
- District: Siah Rud
- Rural District: Dizmar-e Gharbi

Population (2016)
  - Total: 1,800
- Time zone: UTC+3:30 (IRST)

Iri-ye Sofla (Persian: ايري سفلي) (Note: Also romanized as Īrī Soflá, Īrī-e Soflá, and Īrī-ye Soflá; also known as Dab Īrī, Dabari, Dībrī, Dubra, Īrī Pā’īn, and Īrī-ye Pā’īn) is a village in Dizmar-e Gharbi Rural District of Siah Rud District in Jolfa County, East Azerbaijan province, Iran.

== Demographics ==
=== Population ===
At the time of the 2006 National Census, the village's population was 1,616 in 410 households. The following census in 2011 counted 1,908 people in 504 households. The 2016 census measured the population of the village as 1,800 people in 581 households. It was the most populous village in its rural district.
