= Oruch =

Oruch may refer to:

- Aruj, a Barbary pirate
- Oruch, Iran, a village in East Azerbaijan Province, Iran
