= Qulan =

Village in East Azerbaijan province, Iran

Qulan Persian: قولان
- Village
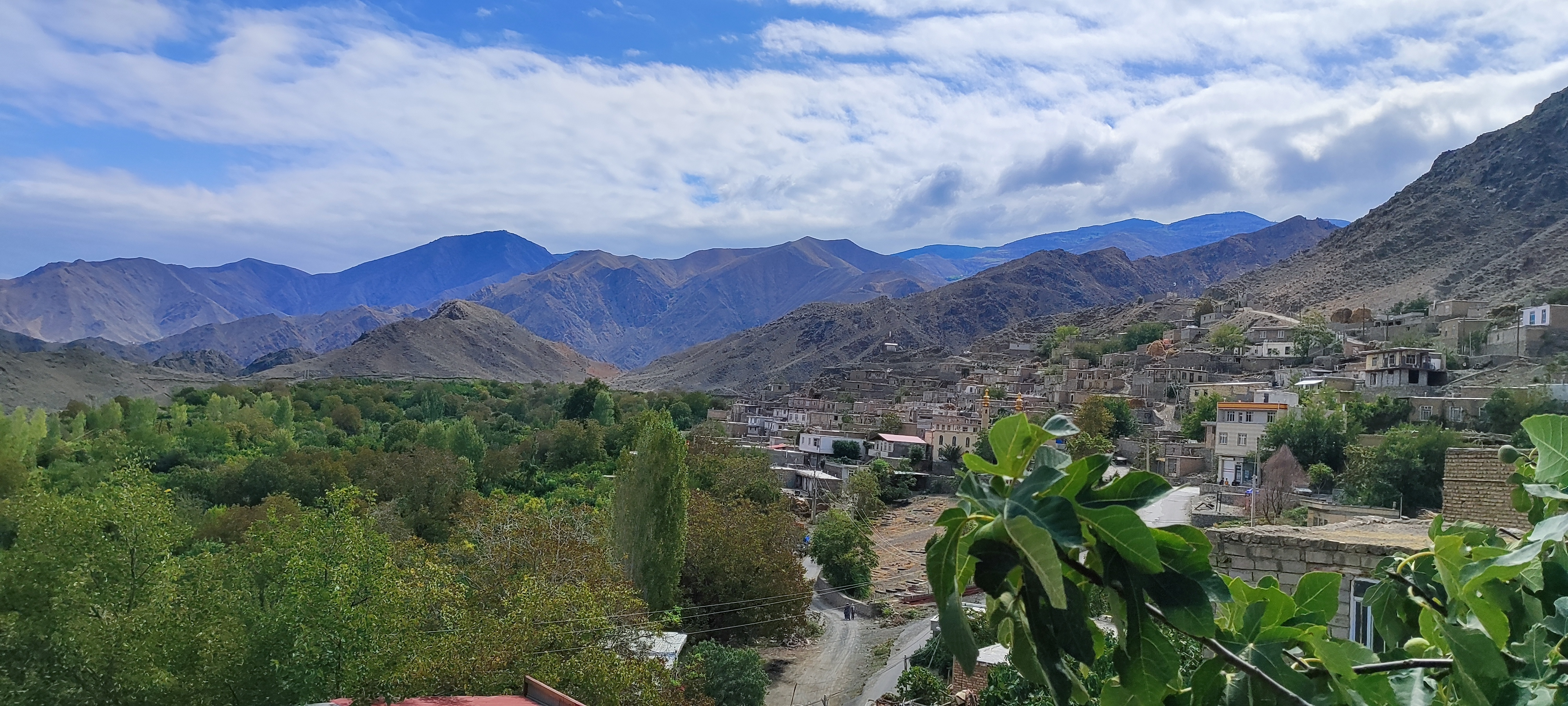
- The village of Qulan

- Location within Iran
- Coordinates: 38°53′42″N 46°23′47″E
- Country: Iran
- Province: East Azerbaijan
- County: Jolfa
- District: Siah Rud
- Rural District: Nowjeh Mehr

Population (2016)
  - Total: 395
- Time zone: UTC+3:30 (IRST)

Qulan (Persian: قولان) (Note: Also romanized as Qūlān; also known as Ghoolan, Kulan, and Qolān) is a village in Nowjeh Mehr Rural District of Siah Rud District in Jolfa County, East Azerbaijan province, Iran.

== Demographics ==
=== Population ===
At the time of the 2006 National Census, the village's population was 491 in 105 households. The following census in 2011 counted 430 people in 102 households. The 2016 census measured the population of the village as 395 people in 128 households.
