= Kordasht Hammam =

Historic bathhouse in Kordasht, Iran

- حمام کردشت
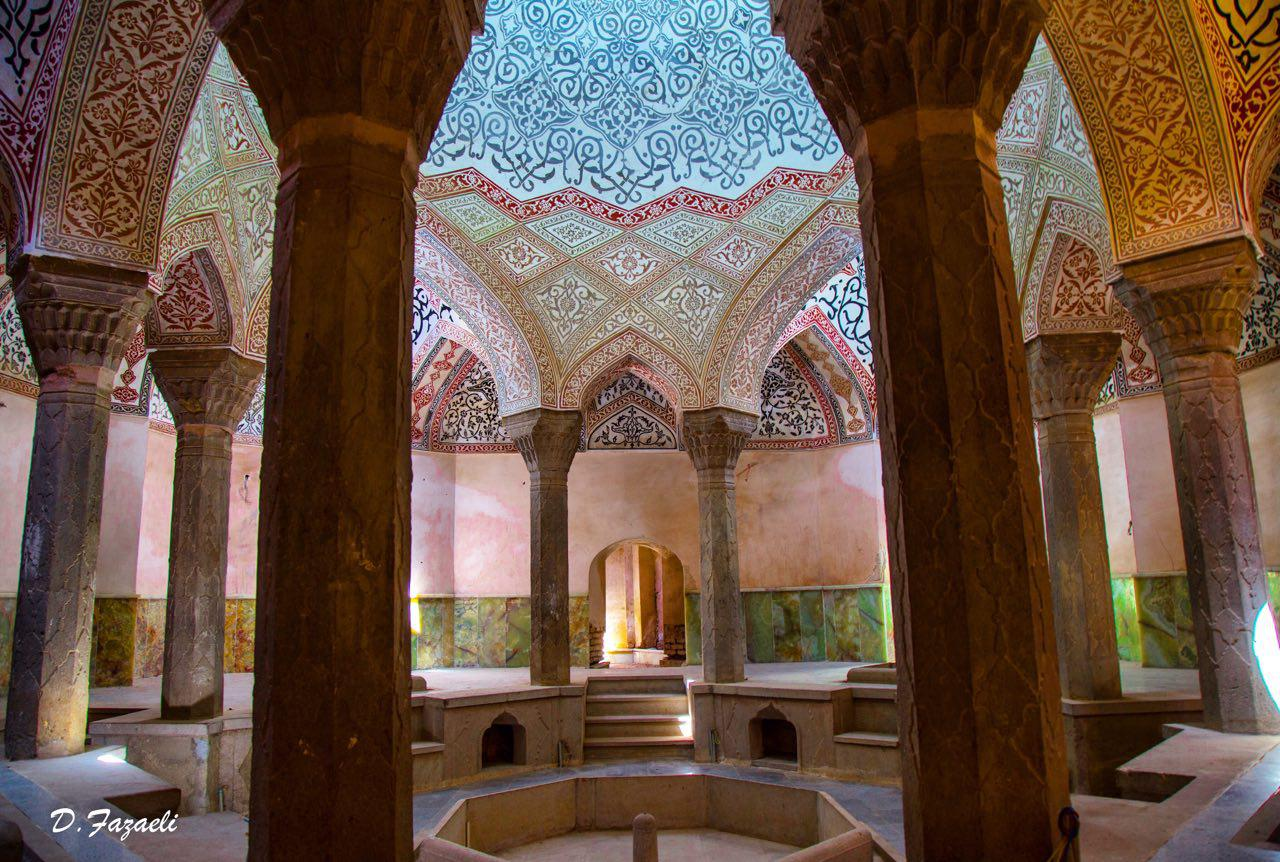
- Interactive map of the Kordasht Hammam area

General information
- Type: Hammam
- Architectural style: Safavid
- Completed: Safavid era

Kordasht Hammam (Persian: حمام کردشت) or the Kordasht Bathhouse is Safavid era Hammam in Kordasht, East Azerbaijan province, Iran.

== History ==
Built by order of Abbas the Great, it was intended to be a royal bathhouse that was only used by the royalty. The building was renovated and was opened to the public during the reign of Agha Mohammad Khan Qajar but fell in ruins after years of disrepair. It operated using the water of the nearby Aras river.

The building was enlisted in the national heritage sites of Iran with the registration number of 1655.

== Gallery ==
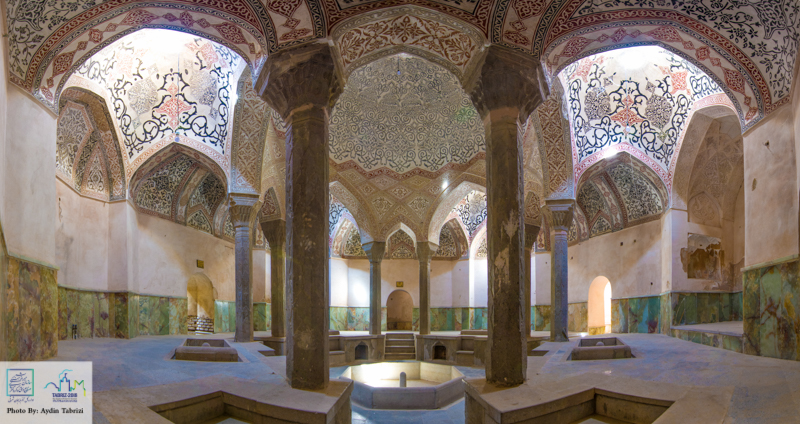

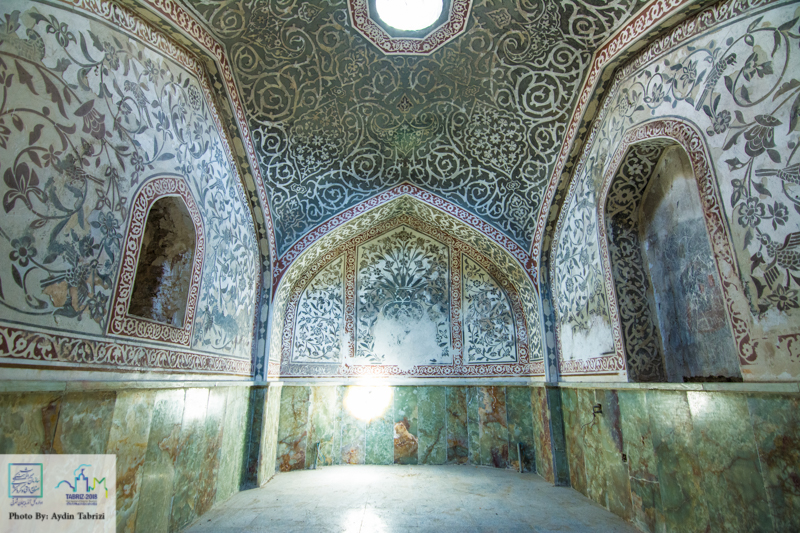

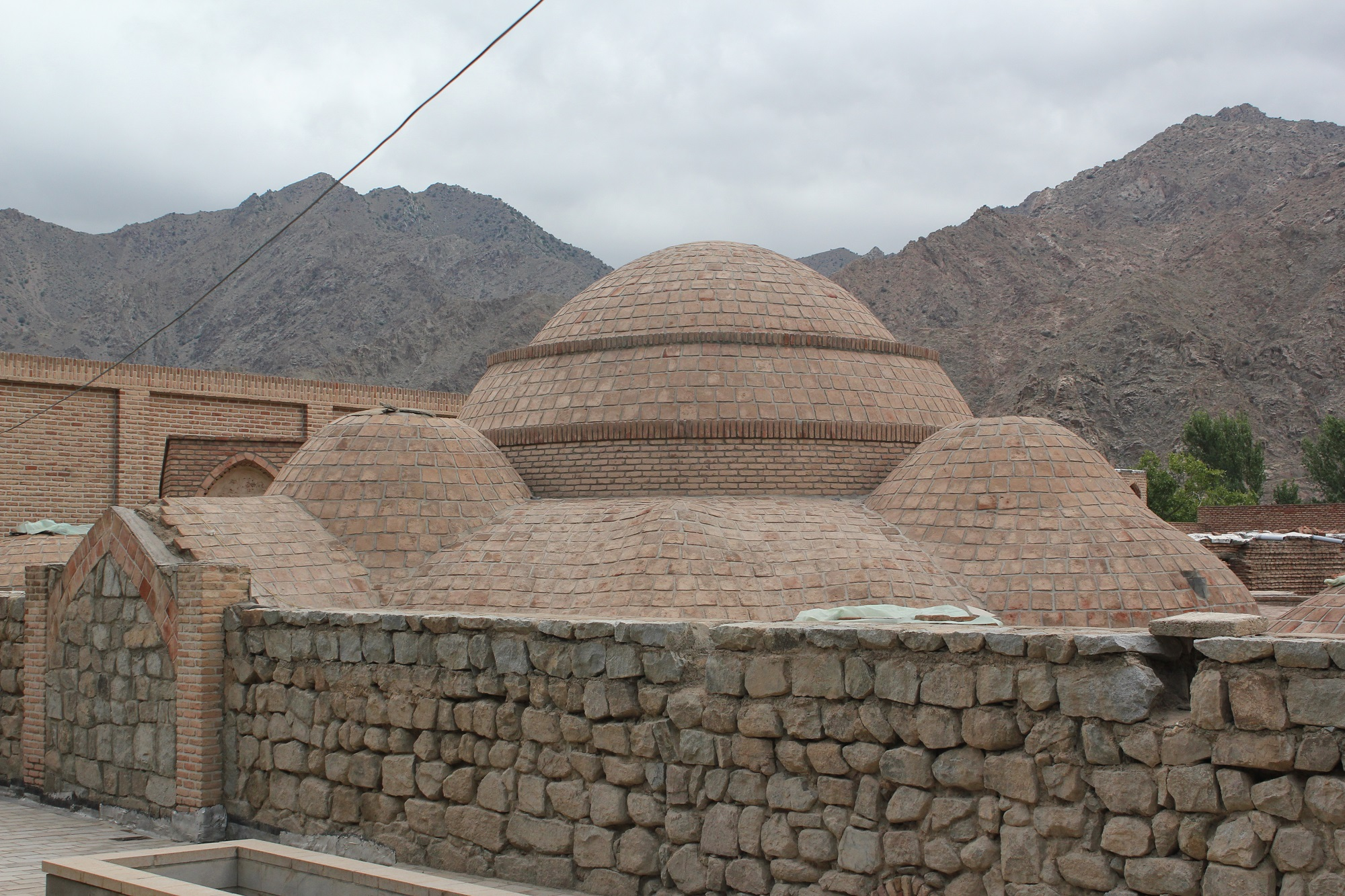

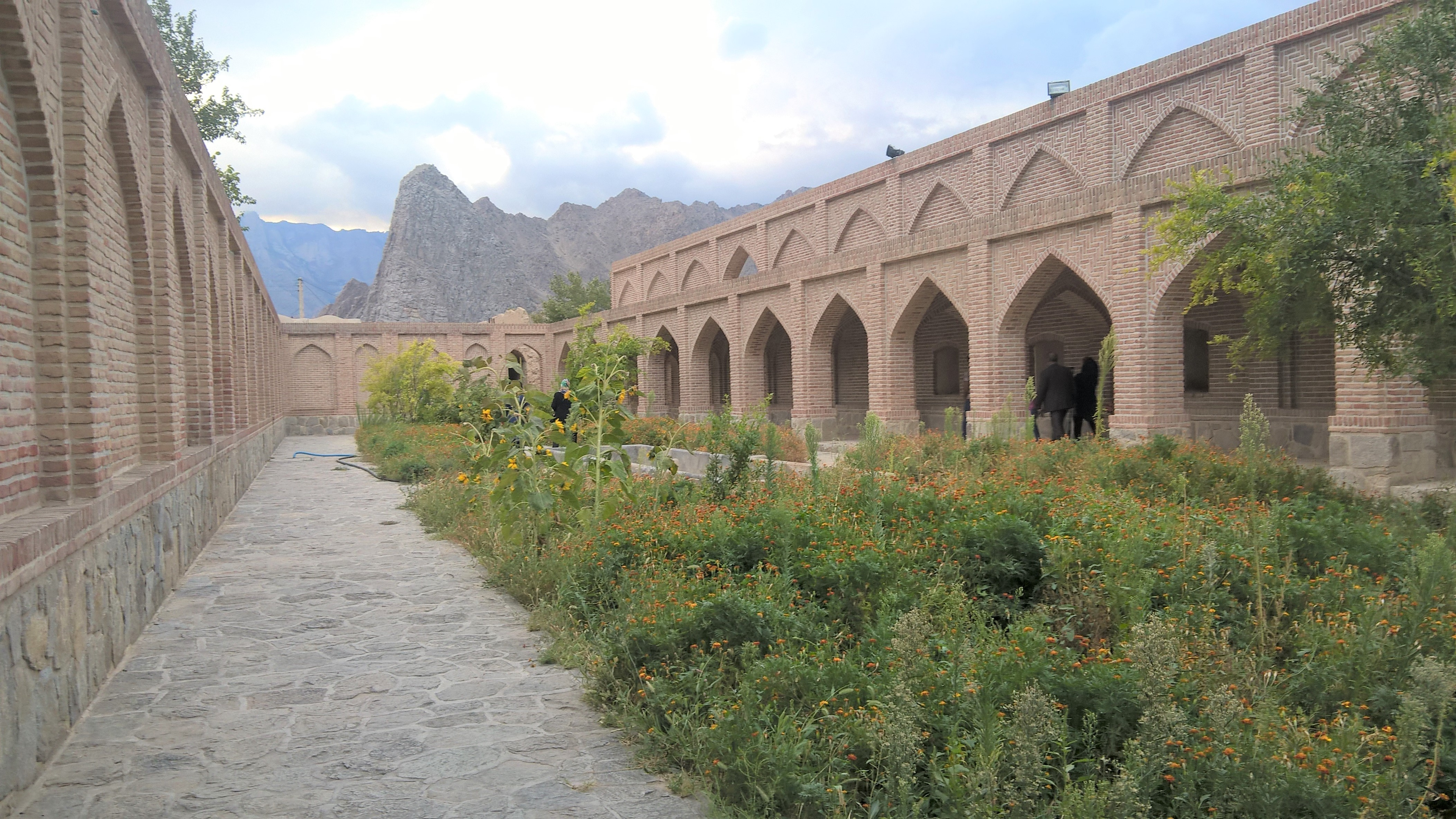

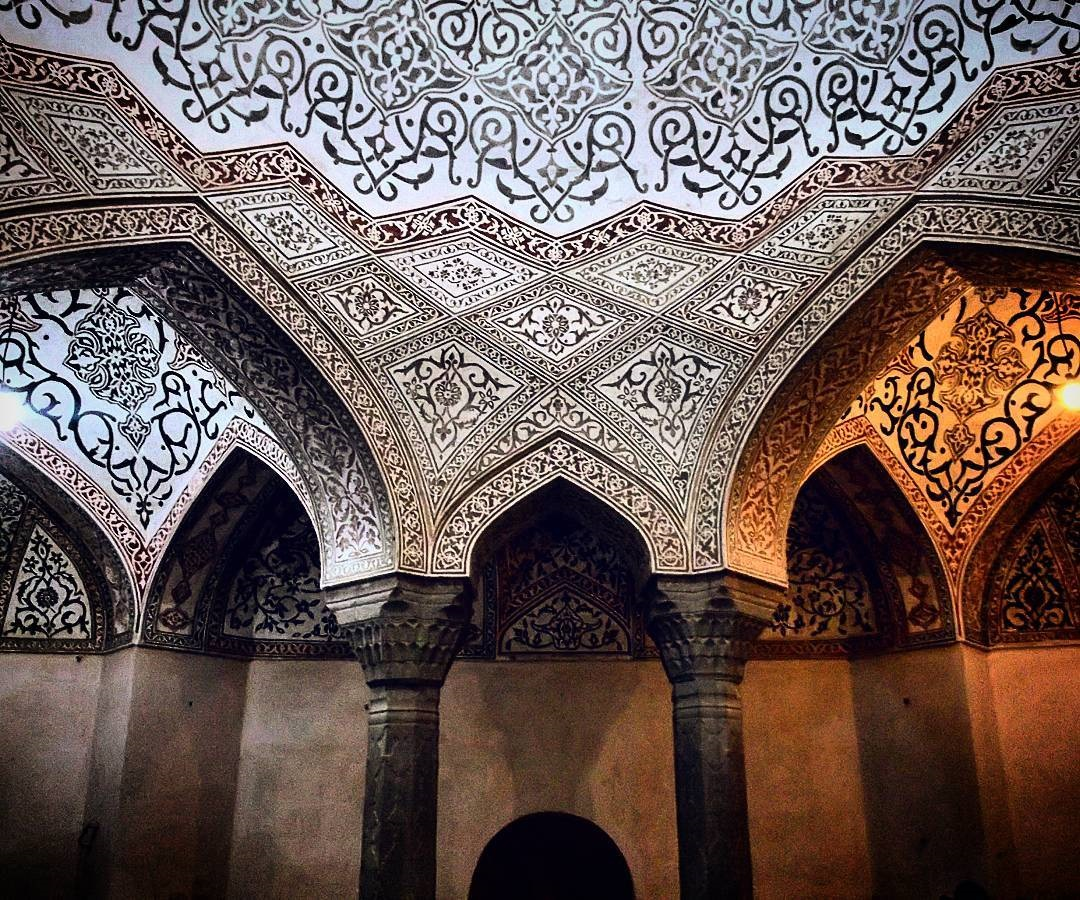

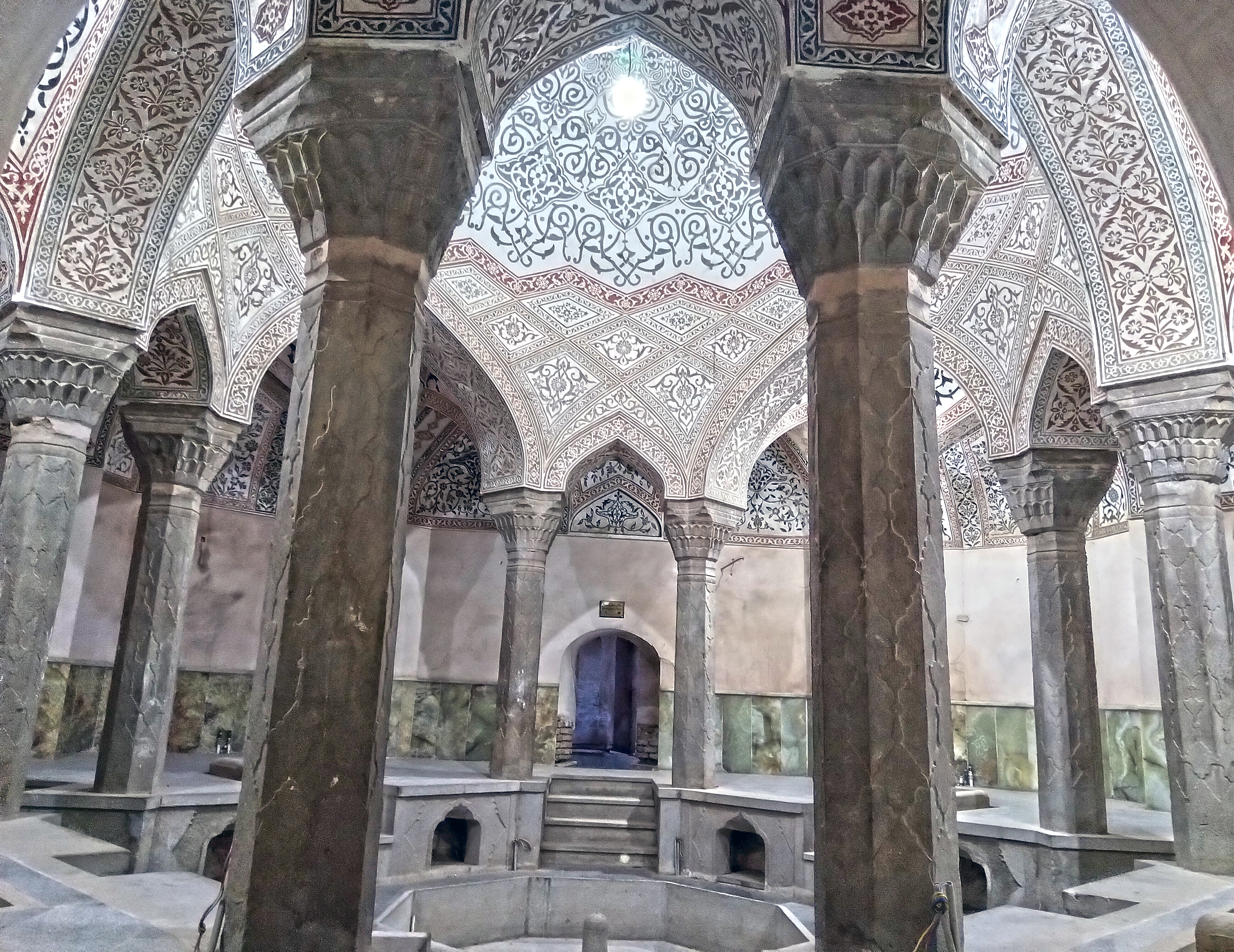

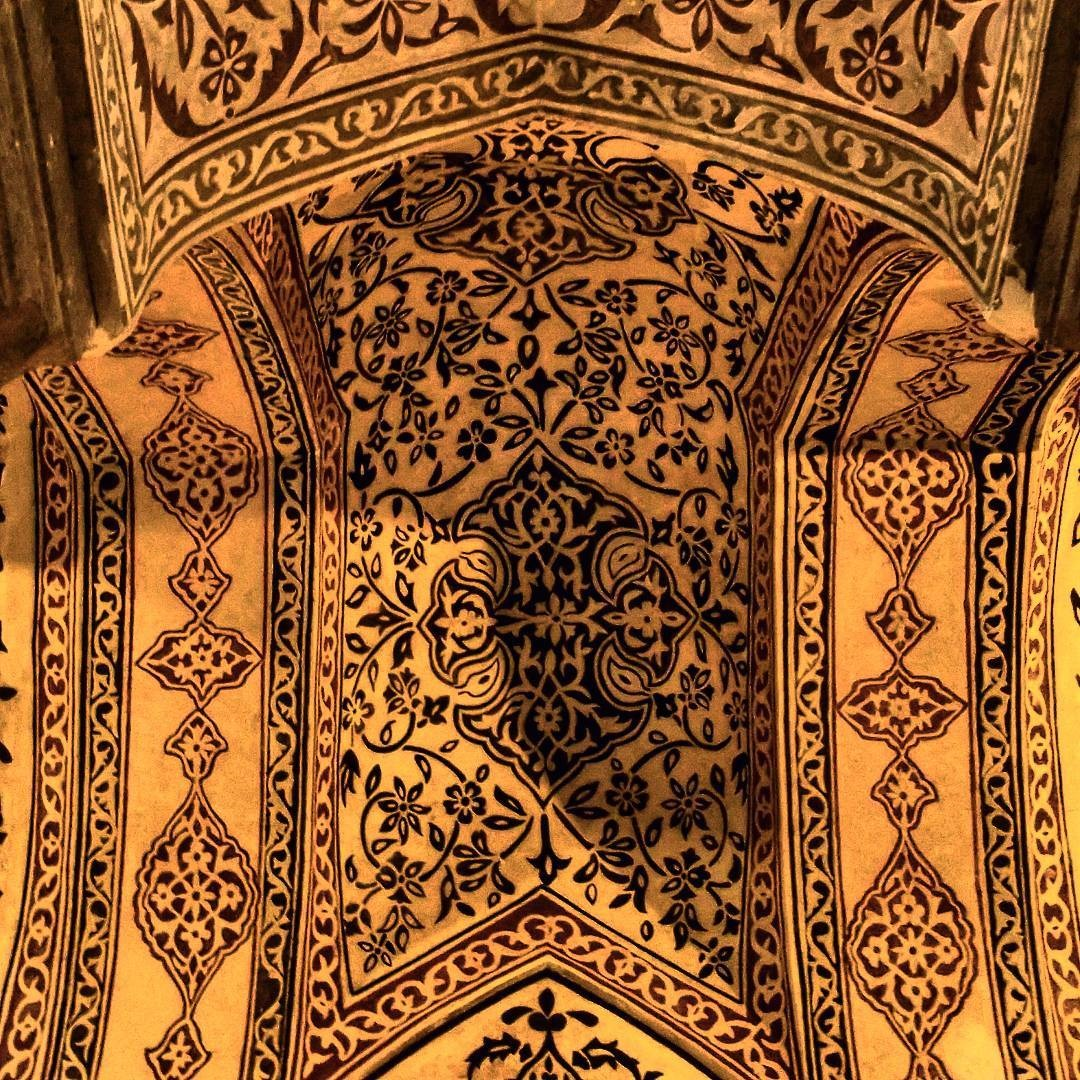

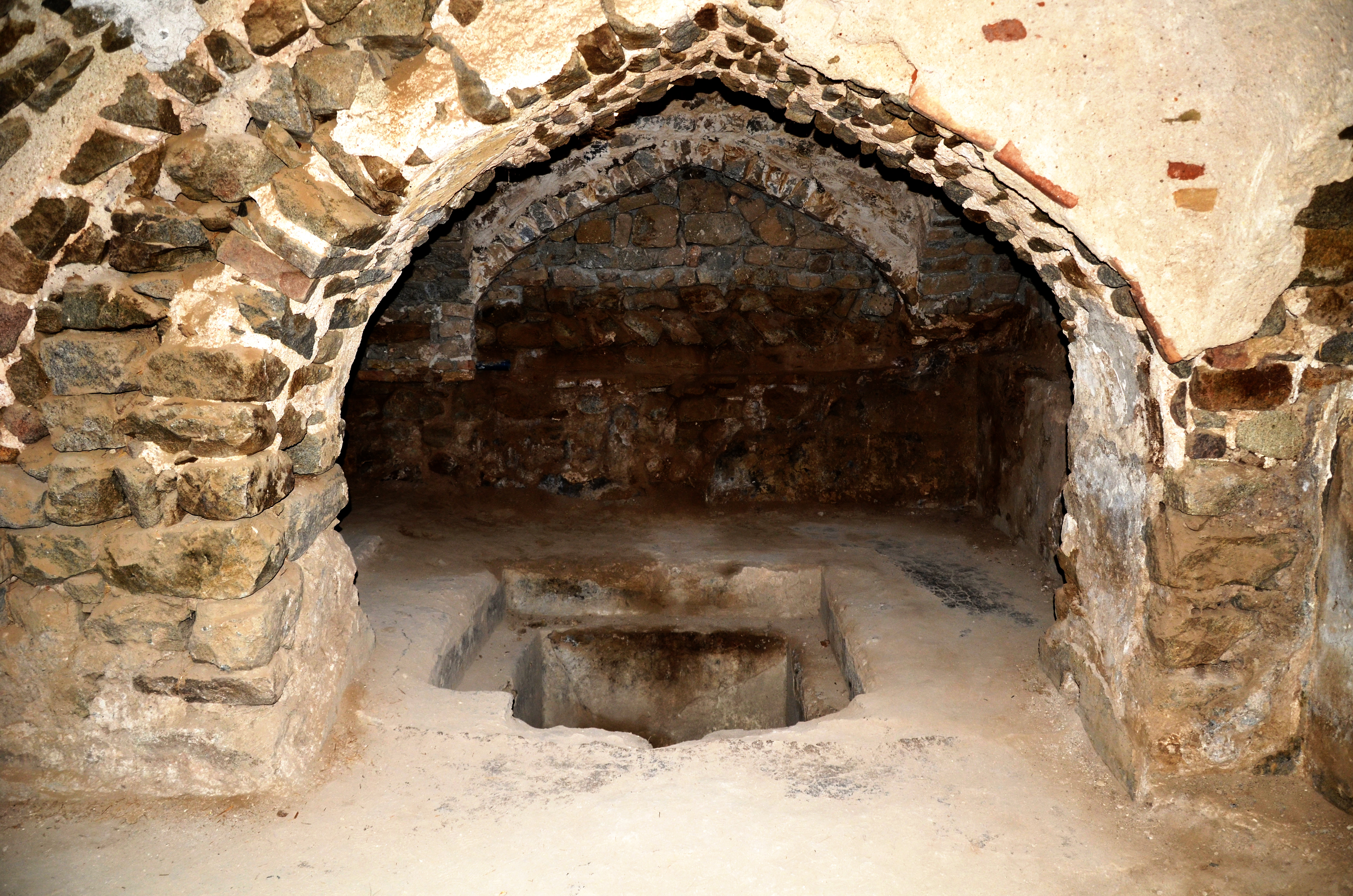
