= Agarak, Meghri =

Agarak Ագարակ
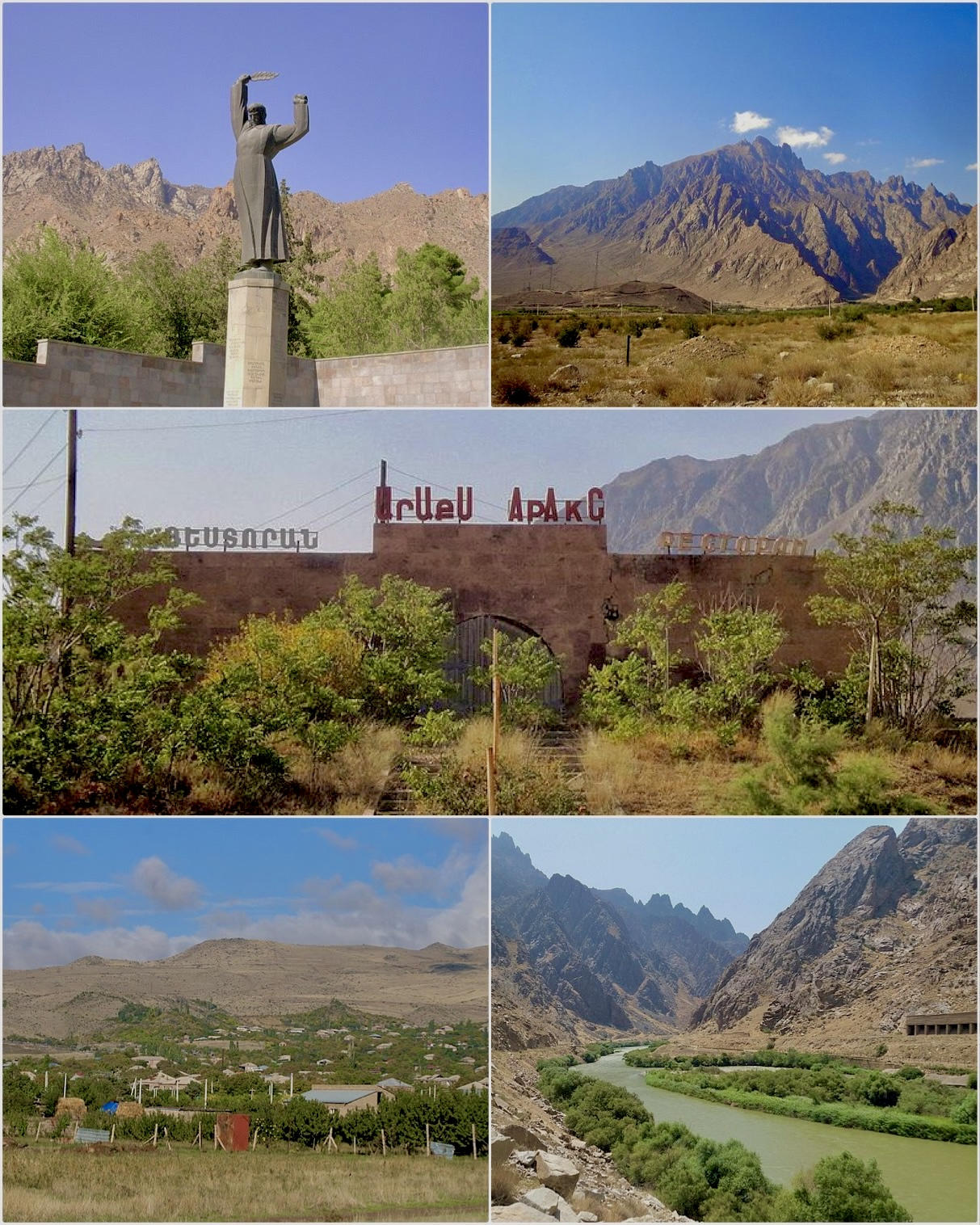
- From top left: War Memorial • Mount Kumtal; Araks Caravanserai • Town Panorama; Araks river and Iran-Armenia Border

- Location within Armenia Location within Syunik Province
- Coordinates: 38°51′54″N 46°11′47″E
- Country: Armenia
- Province: Syunik
- Municipality: Meghri
- Founded: 1949

Area
  - Total: 2.5 km^{2} (0.97 sq mi)
- Elevation: 660 m (2,170 ft)

Population (2022)
  - Total: 3,210
  - Density: 1,300/km^{2} (3,300/sq mi)
- Time zone: UTC+4 (AMT)
- Area code: (+374) 286

Agarak (Armenian: Ագարակ) is a town in the Meghri Municipality of the Syunik Province in southern Armenia, founded in 1949. As of 2011, the population of Agarak was 4,429 and the population of Agarak as of 2022 was 3,210.

The town is located on the left bank of river Araks River, 9 km southwest of Meghri on the Armenia–Iran border. The border crossing at Agarak is Armenia's sole border crossing with Iran, with the Iranian village of Nurduz located across the border. The town had a railway station on the demolished and non-functioning branch of the Yerevan-Nakhchivan-Horadiz railway.

== History ==
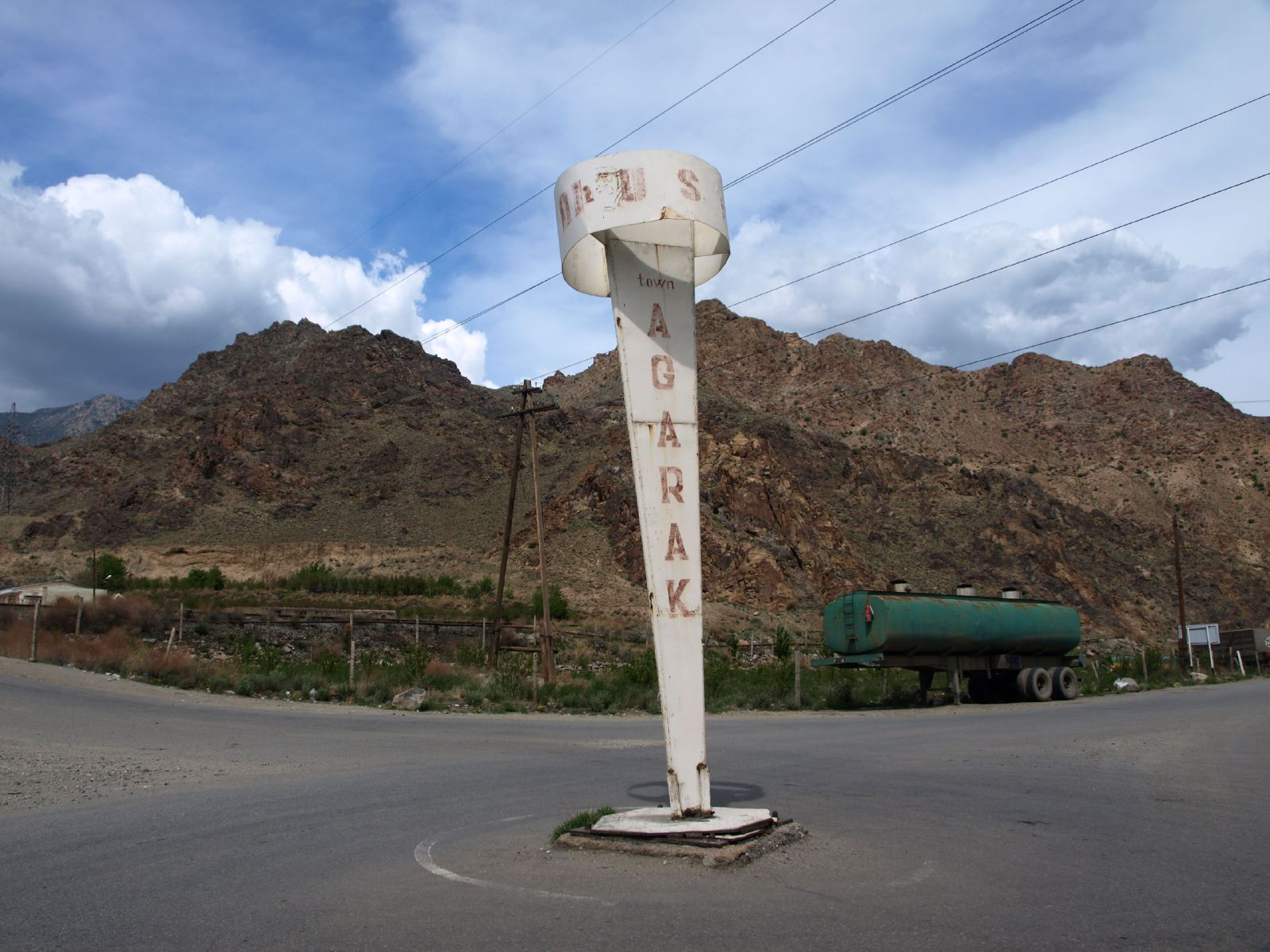
Agarak town sign

Modern-day Agarak is located in the Arevik canton of the historic province of Syunik of Greater Armenia. The area was mentioned in the 12th and 13th centuries by historian Stepanos Orbelian as a rural settlement. However, the region was historically known for its copper and lead mines. The current name of the village is derived from the nearby village of Agarak, literally meaning farm or estate in Armenian.

Two churches dating back to the 17th century lie in the vicinity of Agarak. The church of Surp Amenaprkich (the Holy Saviour) is located in the nearby village of Kuris, north of Agarak, and the Aknakhach church in Agarak.

The Geographical and Statistical Dictionary of the Russian Empire, mentions that the village of Agarak, as of 1861, was located in the Ordubad uezd of the Erivan Governorate. The village at that time was notable for the mine and factory located there. According to the publication, in 1860, the village produced 500 pounds of copper.

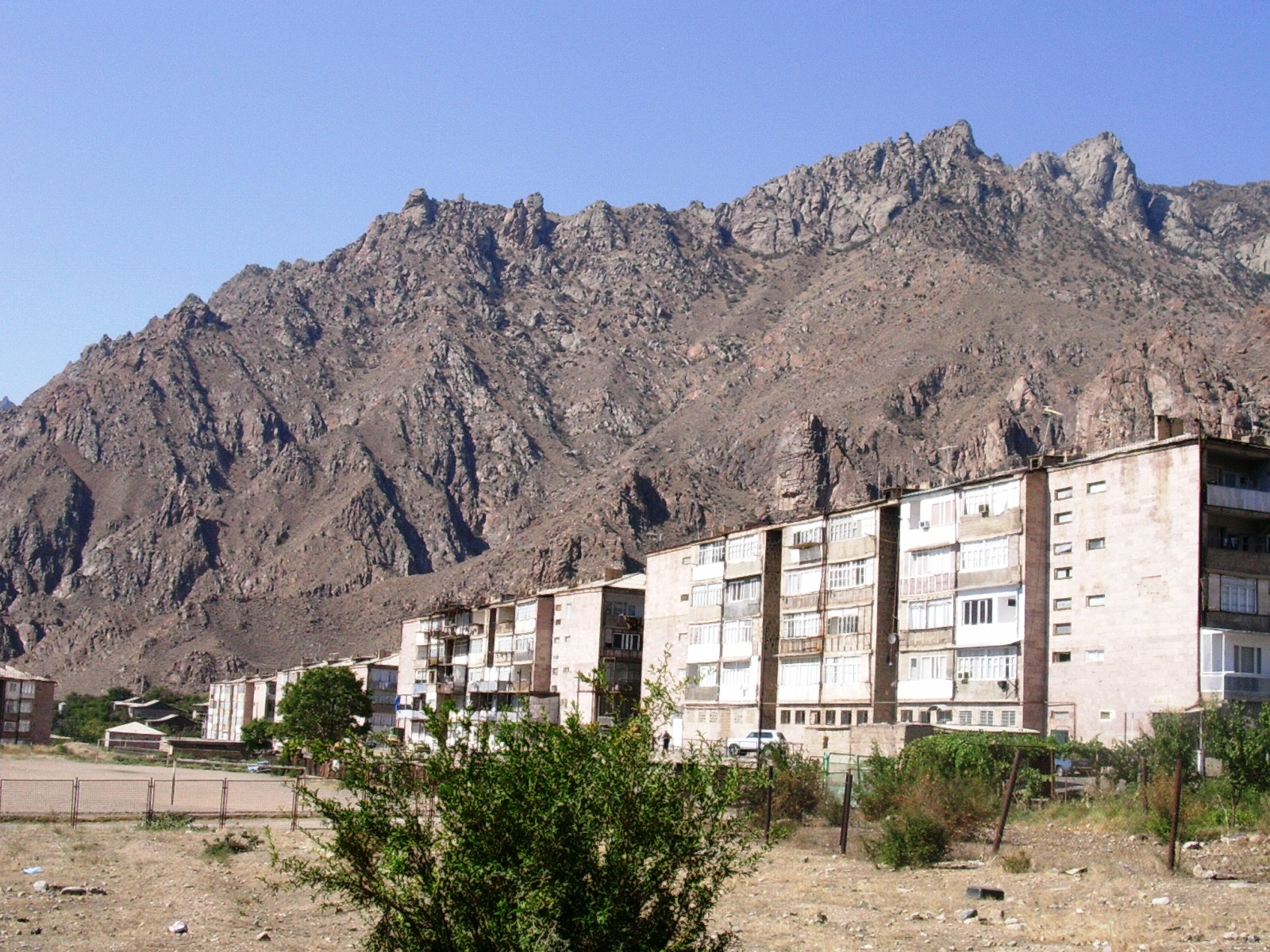
Soviet-era buildings in Agarak

Contemporary Agarak was founded in 1949, during the period of Soviet Armenia, as a settlement to accommodate workers from the nearby copper-molybdenum combine, along with their families. The community grew with the expansion of the combine, making Agarak an important industrial centre on the southern borders of the USSR. During the Khrushchev Thaw, this growing importance was reflected in a state visit by Anastas Mikoyan to Agarak in March 1962. In the first days of its foundation, the settlement was mainly characterized by two-storied residential buildings. By the end of the 1970s, the population had grown so much that three, four, and five-storied buildings were also being constructed in Agarak.

Following the independence of Armenia in 1991, Agarak became an urban municipality within the newly formed Syunik Province and the first bridge connecting Armenia to Iran was established. However, as a result of the 2016 administrative reforms, Agarak was downgraded from town to village, thus becoming a rural settlement within the Meghri Municipality.

The village currently has two kindergartens, one secondary school, one art school, a cultural palace, two libraries and a football stadium.

== Geography ==
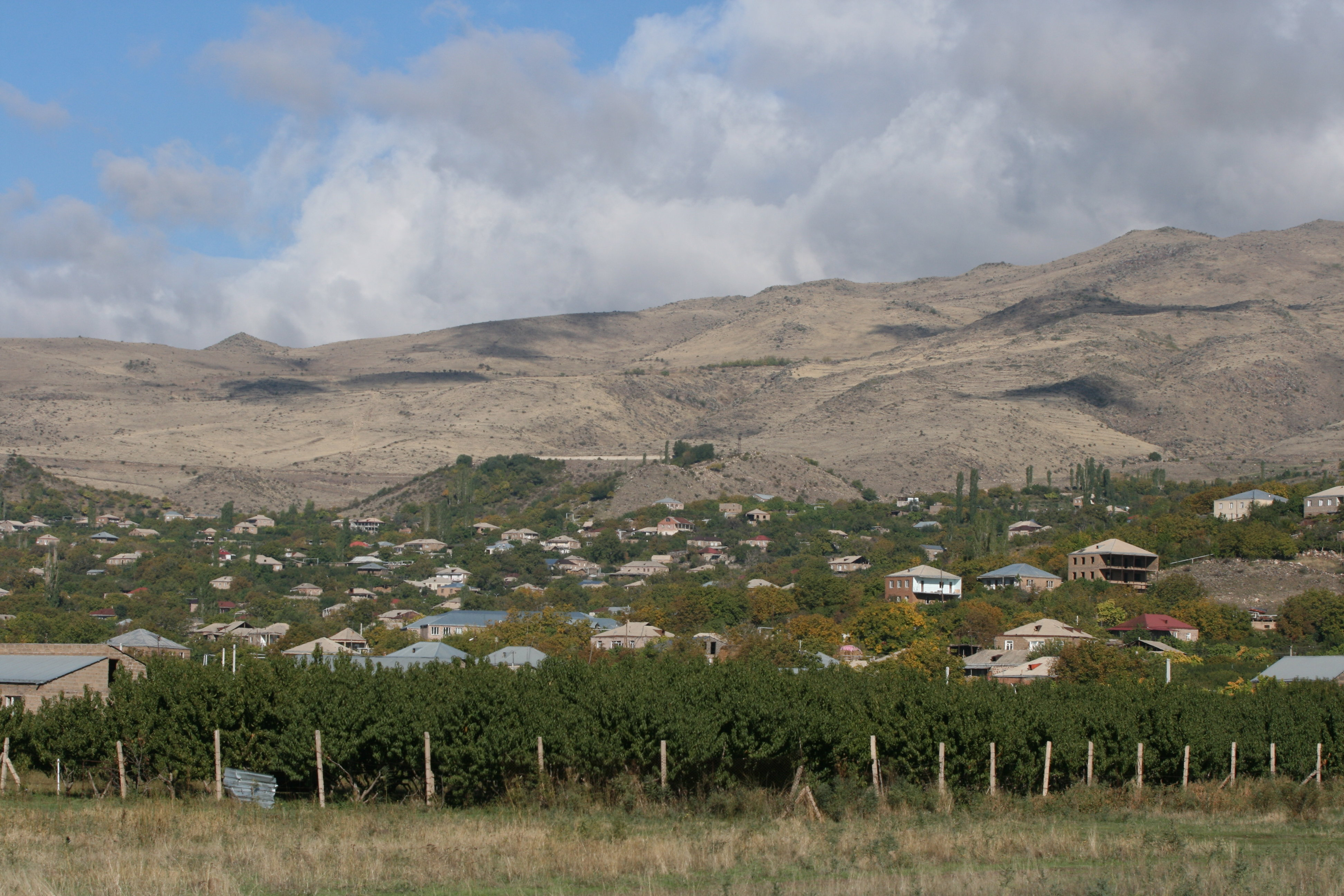
Agarak landscape

Agarak is located in a semi-desert zone and is surrounded by rocky mountains with high cliffs and deep canyons with an average altitude of 660 metres or 2,170 feet. It has a cool arid climate (BWk) according to the Köppen climate classification.

The vicinity of the village is designated as a Prime Butterfly Area, having a number of rare and endangered species of butterflies. Among them are Gegenes nostrodamus, Zegris eupheme, Pieris krueperi, Chazara briseis, Cupido argiades, Pseudophilotes vicrama, and others.

== Economy ==
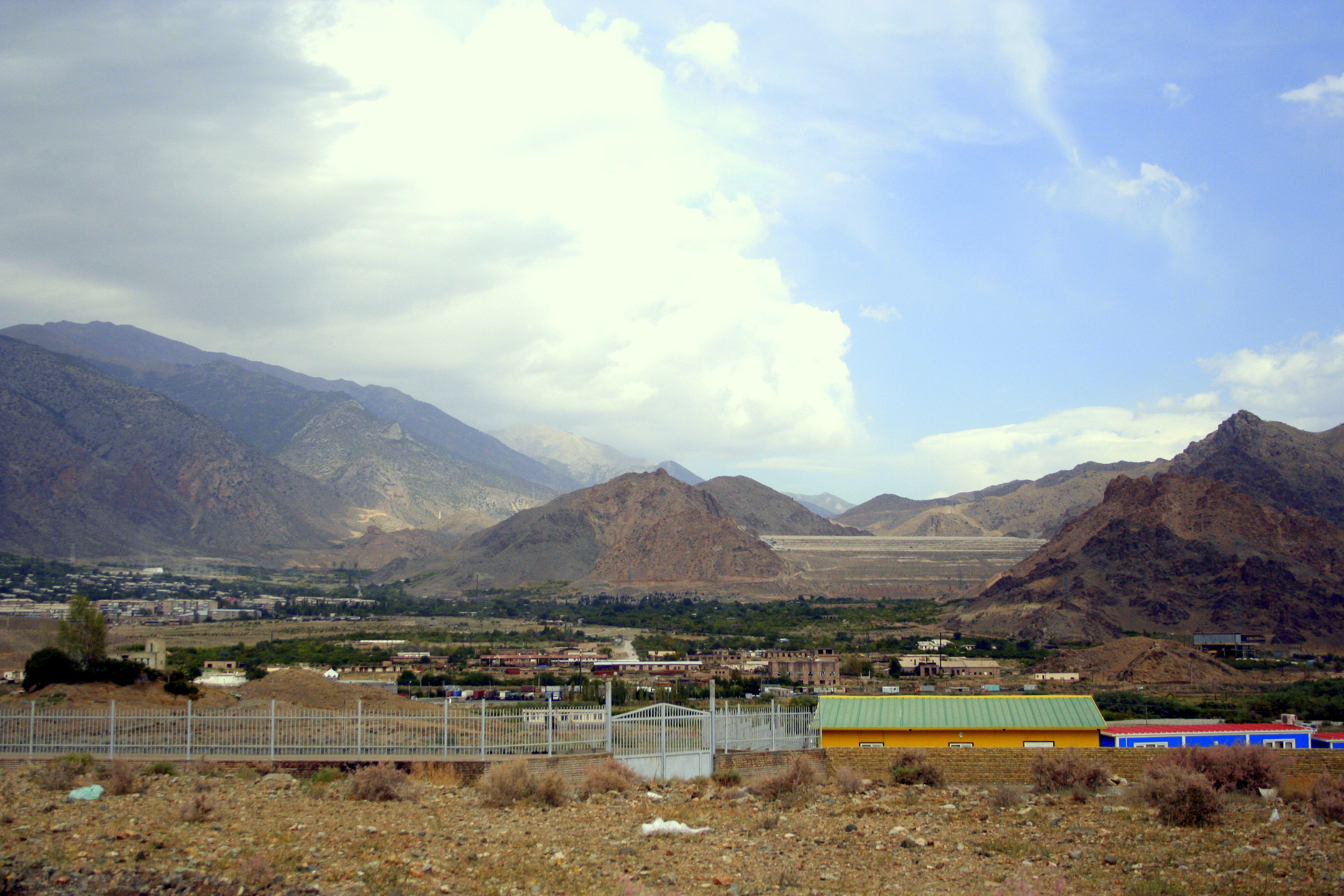
Iran-Armenia border checkpoint in Agarak

It is an important centre for non-ferrous metallurgy. In 1853, a copper-molybdenum deposit was discovered, and in 1958 a copper-molybdenum plant was opened in the village, which includes a quarry and a processing plant. The Agarak copper deposit and smeltery have been operating since 1963. The copper-molybdenum industry in Agarak has been recovered since 2001. Currently, the copper-molybdenum plant secures around 1200 jobs for the population of Agarak, which makes around 25% of the entire population of Agarak. The Agarak Copper-Molybdenum mine complex produces copper and molybdenum concentrate through bulk-selective flotation recovery of molybdenum and copper minerals. It was fully acquired by GeoProMining company in 2007.

The Meghri custom house and the border checkpoint with Iran are situated in the territory of Agarak. The construction of the Armenian section of the Iran-Armenia gas pipeline started in Agarak on 30 November 2004. The pipeline started operations on 20 December 2006.

Tourism from Iran is a growing industry in Agarak. Many of the Iranian tourists stop in Meghri and Agarak to go to the restaurants, cafes, and stores. The Persian language is in high demand in Agarak with frequent Persian-language signs, and many of the locals engaged in services are proficient in colloquial Persian.

== Demographics ==
The population of Agarak since 1908 is as follows:

Historical population
Year	Pop.	±% p.a.
1908	264	—
1959	1,614	+3.61%
1970	3,914	+8.39%
1972	3,800	−1.47%
1979	4,073	+1.00%
2001	4,801	+0.75%
2011	4,429	−0.80%
2022	3,210	−2.88%
