= Siah Rud =

City in East Azerbaijan province, Iran

Siah Rud Persian: سيه رود
- City
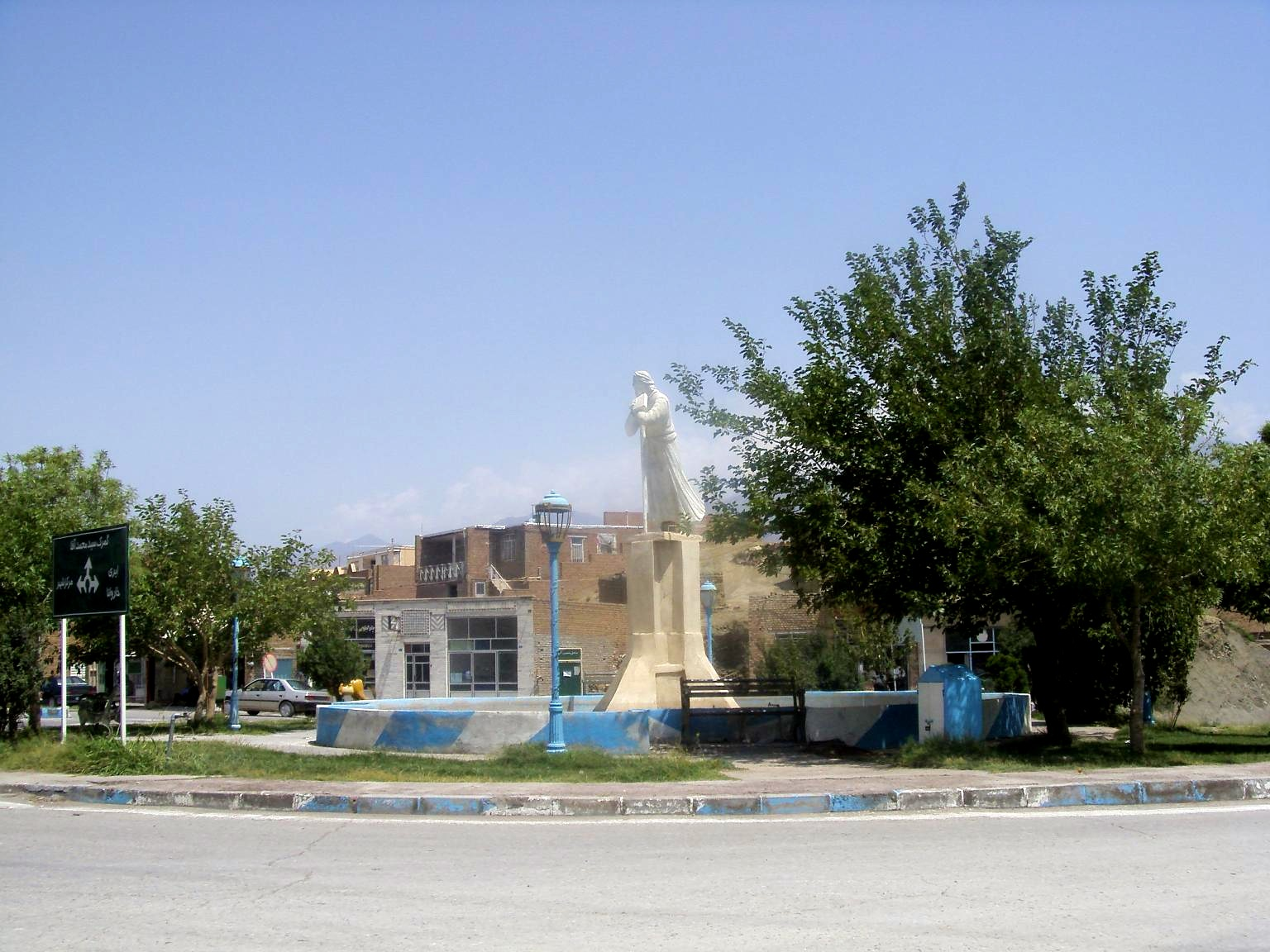

- Location within Iran
- Coordinates: 38°52′03″N 46°00′17″E
- Country: Iran
- Province: East Azerbaijan
- County: Jolfa
- District: Siah Rud

Population (2016)
  - Total: 1,548
- Time zone: UTC+3:30 (IRST)

Siah Rud (Persian: سيه رود) (Note: Also romanized as Seyah Rūd, Sīah Rūd, and Sīyah Rūd; also known as Verkhnyaya Siara) is a city in, and the capital of, Siah Rud District in Jolfa County, East Azerbaijan province, Iran. It also serves as the administrative center for Dizmar-e Gharbi Rural District.

== Demographics ==
=== Population ===
At the time of the 2006 National Census, the city's population was 1,354 in 366 households. The following census in 2011 counted 1,553 people in 419 households. The 2016 census measured the population of the city as 1,548 people in 470 households.
