= Mesen, Iran =

Mesen or Masen or Mesan or Mosan or Masan (Persian: مسن or ماسان or ماسن) may refer to:

- Mesen, Chaharmahal and Bakhtiari (مسن - Mesen)
- Mesan, East Azerbaijan (مسن - Mesan)
- Mesen, Hormozgan (مسن - Mesen)
- Masan, Kurdistan (ماسان - Māsān)
- Masen (ماسن - Māsen), South Khorasan Province
