= Qareh Daraq =

Qareh Daraq (Persian: قره درق), also rendered as Qara Darreh, may refer to:

- Qareh Daraq, East Azerbaijan
- Qareh Daraq, Zanjan
