= Pahnabad =

Pahnabad پهن اباد
- Village
- Location within Iran
- Coordinates: 34°50′30″N 48°36′53″E
- Country: Iran
- Province: Hamadan
- County: Hamadan
- Bakhsh: Central
- Rural District: Sangestan

Population (2006)
  - Total: 163
- Time zone: UTC+3:30 (IRST)
  - Summer (DST): UTC+4:30 (IRDT)

Pahnabad (Persian: پهن اباد, also Romanized as Pahnābād; also known as Pahnāvar and Pahnehbor) is a village in Sangestan Rural District, in the Central District of Hamadan County, Hamadan Province, Iran. At the 2006 census, its population was 163, in 37 families.
