= Masan (Gangwon) =

Mountain in South Korea

Highest point
- Elevation: 1,051.9 m (3,451 ft)

Geography
- Location: South Korea

Korean name
- Hangul: 마산
- Hanja: 馬山
- RR: Masan
- MR: Masan

Masan (Korean: 마산) is a mountain in Goseong County, Gangwon Province, South Korea. It has an elevation of 1,051.9 m (3,451 ft).

== See also ==
- List of mountains in Korea
