= Pahnavar, Mazandaran =

Pahnavar پهناور
- Village
- Location within Iran
- Coordinates: 36°32′57″N 52°32′41″E
- Country: Iran
- Province: Mazandaran
- County: Babol
- Bakhsh: Lalehabad
- Rural District: Karipey

Population (2006)
  - Total: 238
- Time zone: UTC+3:30 (IRST)
  - Summer (DST): UTC+4:30 (IRDT)

Pahnavar (Persian: پهناور, also Romanized as Pahnāvar; also known as Pahnevar) is a village in Karipey Rural District, Lalehabad District, Babol County, Mazandaran Province, Iran. At the 2006 census, its population was 238, in 54 families.
