= Dizmar-e Gharbi Rural District =

Rural district in East Azerbaijan province, Iran

Dizmar-e Gharbi Rural District Persian: دهستان ديزمار غربي
- Rural District
- Location within Iran
- Coordinates: 38°46′N 46°02′E
- Country: Iran
- Province: East Azerbaijan
- County: Jolfa
- District: Siah Rud
- Established: 1987
- Capital: Siah Rud

Population (2016)
  - Total: 3,191
- Time zone: UTC+3:30 (IRST)

Dizmar-e Gharbi Rural District (Persian: دهستان ديزمار غربي) is in Siah Rud District of Jolfa County, East Azerbaijan province, Iran. It is administered from the city of Siah Rud.

== Demographics ==
=== Population ===
At the time of the 2006 National Census, the rural district's population was 3,437 in 853 households. There were 3,467 inhabitants in 931 households at the following census of 2011. The 2016 census measured the population of the rural district as 3,191 in 1,021 households. The most populous of its five villages was Iri-ye Sofla, with 1,800 people.

=== Other villages in the rural district ===
- Holaq
- Komar-e Olya
- Komar-e Sofla
- Vediq
