= Masan, Kurdistan =

Kurdish village in Iran

Masan ماسان
- Village
- Location within Iran
- Coordinates: 34°56′35″N 46°52′06″E
- Country: Iran
- Province: Kurdistan
- County: Kamyaran
- Bakhsh: Muchesh
- Rural District: Gavrud

Population (2006)
  - Total: 552
- Time zone: UTC+3:30 (IRST)
  - Summer (DST): UTC+4:30 (IRDT)

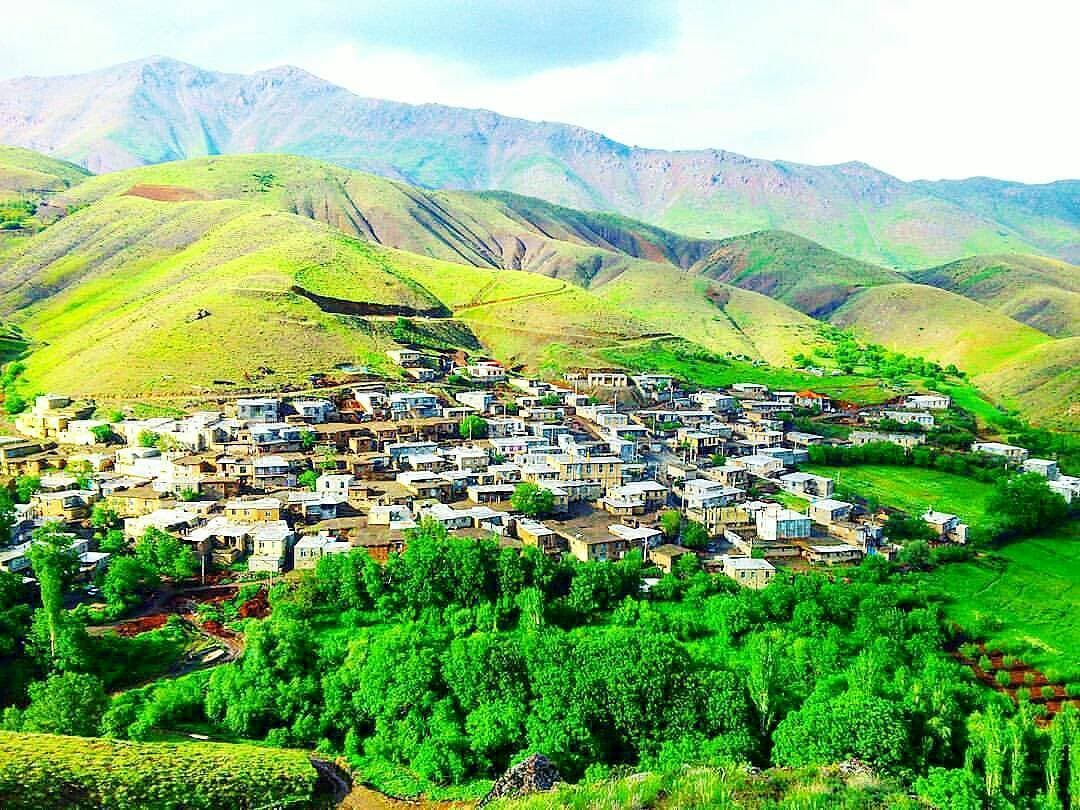
Masan

Masan (Persian: ماسان, also Romanized as Māsān) is a village in Gavrud Rural District, Muchesh District, Kamyaran County, Kurdistan Province, Iran. At the 2006 census, its population was 552, in 129 families. The village is populated by Kurds.
