= Ulu Masen =

Tropical rainforest area in Aceh province, Indonesia

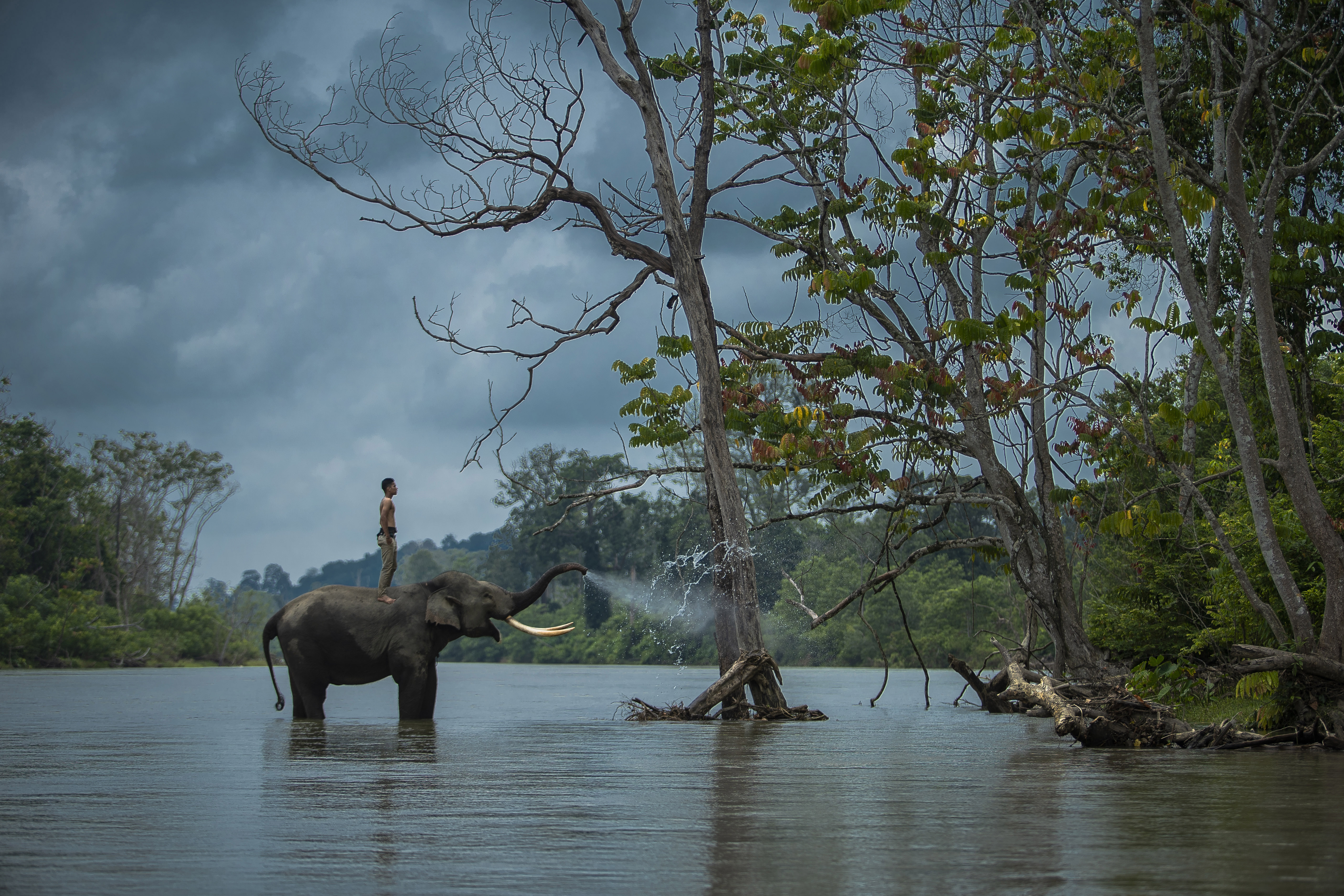
Elephas maximus sumatranus. In this picture, a mahout was riding an elephant. The elephant was spraying water towards the tree before it. This picture was taken in CRU Samponiet Reserve, Aceh, Indonesia.

The Ulu Masen Ecosystem is a tropical rainforest area of approximately 738,856 hectares located in Aceh province, Indonesia. Situated within the Sundaland biodiversity hotspot, this region borders the more renowned Leuser Ecosystem, creating a critical corridor for wildlife conservation in Southeast Asia.

== Biodiversity ==
Ulu Masen is home to numerous endangered species, including the Sumatran tiger (Panthera tigris sumatrae), Sumatran elephant, clouded leopard, pangolin, and over 300 bird species. The region also provides abundant prey species, such as sambar deer and wild boars, which are essential for sustaining predator populations. These unique ecological dynamics make the area a vital conservation priority. Despite its ecological richness, the region faces challenges in maintaining a stable balance between predators and prey. Fragmentation of habitat and human activities have put pressure on many species, emphasizing the need for concerted protection efforts.

== Key threats ==
Poaching remains one of the most significant threats to the Ulu Masen ecosystem. Sumatran tigers are highly targeted due to the demand for their skins and body parts in traditional medicine markets, particularly in China and Vietnam. Indiscriminate snares set for other wildlife often catch tigers as unintended victims, further endangering the population.

Habitat loss due to illegal logging, mining, and agricultural expansion has fragmented the forest and eroded its biodiversity. Between 2001 and 2023, Ulu Masen lost about 370 km^{2} of its primary forest cover, disrupting crucial wildlife corridors and threatening the area's ecological stability.

== Conservation ==
The Indonesian government has made strides in community-based conservation by granting Indigenous communities the legal right to manage 225 km^{2} of forest in Ulu Masen. This initiative aims to ensure sustainable forest management while empowering local stakeholders.

Additionally, experts emphasize the importance of increasing ranger patrols to curb poaching and habitat degradation. Effective patrols have reduced snares by up to 41% in similar conservation areas, though Ulu Masen would require an estimated 560–640 rangers to cover its vast landscape.

== Potential and outlook ==
Despite its challenges, Ulu Masen holds potential for biodiversity conservation. Multidisciplinary approaches, including enhanced law enforcement and community involvement, are key to ensuring its long-term sustainability.
