= Masen =

Masen ماسن
- Village
- Location within Iran
- Coordinates: 33°05′58″N 59°20′26″E
- Country: Iran
- Province: South Khorasan
- County: Birjand
- Bakhsh: Central
- Rural District: Alqurat

Population (2006)
  - Total: 48
- Time zone: UTC+3:30 (IRST)
  - Summer (DST): UTC+4:30 (IRDT)

Masen (Persian: ماسن, also Romanized as Māsen) is a village in Alqurat Rural District, in the Central District of Birjand County, South Khorasan Province, Iran. At the 2006 census, its population was 48, in 26 families.
