= Nowjeh Mehr Rural District =

Rural district in East Azerbaijan province, Iran

Nowjeh Mehr Rural District Persian: دهستان نوجه مهر
- Rural District
- Location within Iran
- Coordinates: 38°50′N 46°20′E
- Country: Iran
- Province: East Azerbaijan
- County: Jolfa
- District: Siah Rud
- Established: 1993
- Capital: Nowjeh Mehr

Population (2016)
  - Total: 3,267
- Time zone: UTC+3:30 (IRST)

Nowjeh Mehr Rural District (Persian: دهستان نوجه مهر) is in Siah Rud District of Jolfa County, East Azerbaijan province, Iran. Its capital is the village of Nowjeh Mehr.

== Demographics ==
=== Population ===
At the time of the 2006 National Census, the rural district's population was 3,716 in 867 households. There were 3,416 inhabitants in 934 households at the following census of 2011. The 2016 census measured the population of the rural district as 3,267 in 997 households. The most populous of its 26 villages was Duzal, with 532 people.

=== Other villages in the rural district ===
- Kordasht
- Qulan
- Ushtibin
