= Siah Rud District =

District in East Azerbaijan province, Iran

Siah Rud District Persian: بخش سيه رود
- District
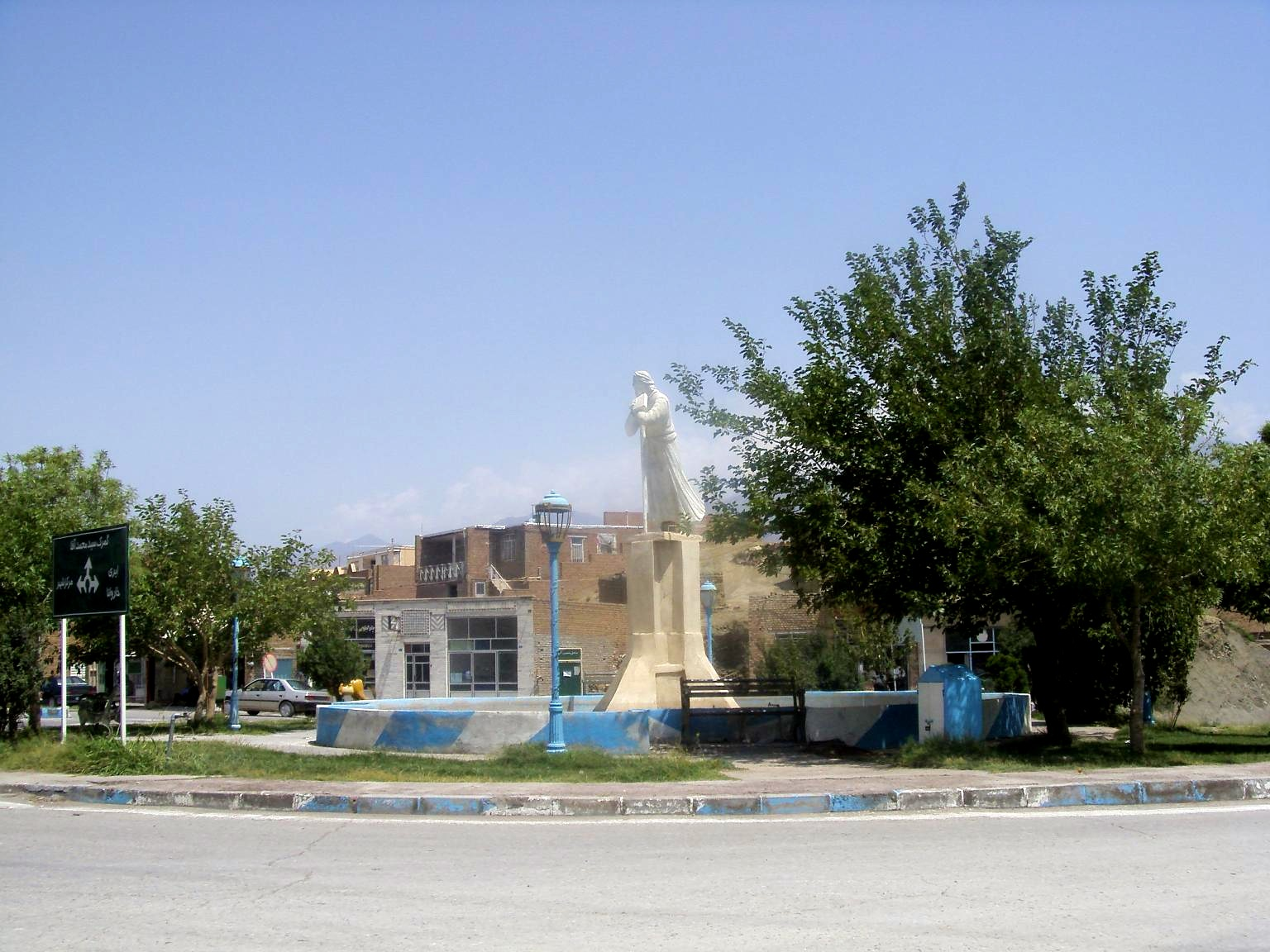

- Location within Iran
- Coordinates: 38°47′N 46°12′E
- Country: Iran
- Province: East Azerbaijan
- County: Jolfa
- Established: 1995
- Capital: Siah Rud

Population (2016)
  - Total: 8,006
- Time zone: UTC+3:30 (IRST)

Siah Rud District (Persian: بخش سيه رود) is in Jolfa County, East Azerbaijan province, Iran. Its capital is the city of Siah Rud.

== Demographics ==
=== Population ===
At the time of the 2006 National Census, the district's population was 8,507 in 2,086 households. The following census in 2011 counted 8,436 people in 2,284 households. The 2016 census measured the population of the district as 8,006 inhabitants in 2,488 households.

=== Administrative divisions ===
Siah Rud District Population
Administrative Divisions	2006	2011	2016
Dizmar-e Gharbi RD	3,437	3,467	3,191
Nowjeh Mehr RD	3,716	3,416	3,267
Siah Rud (city)	1,354	1,553	1,548
Total	8,507	8,436	8,006
RD = Rural District
