= Jolfa County =

County in East Azerbaijan province, Iran

Jolfa County Persian: شهرستان جلفا
- County
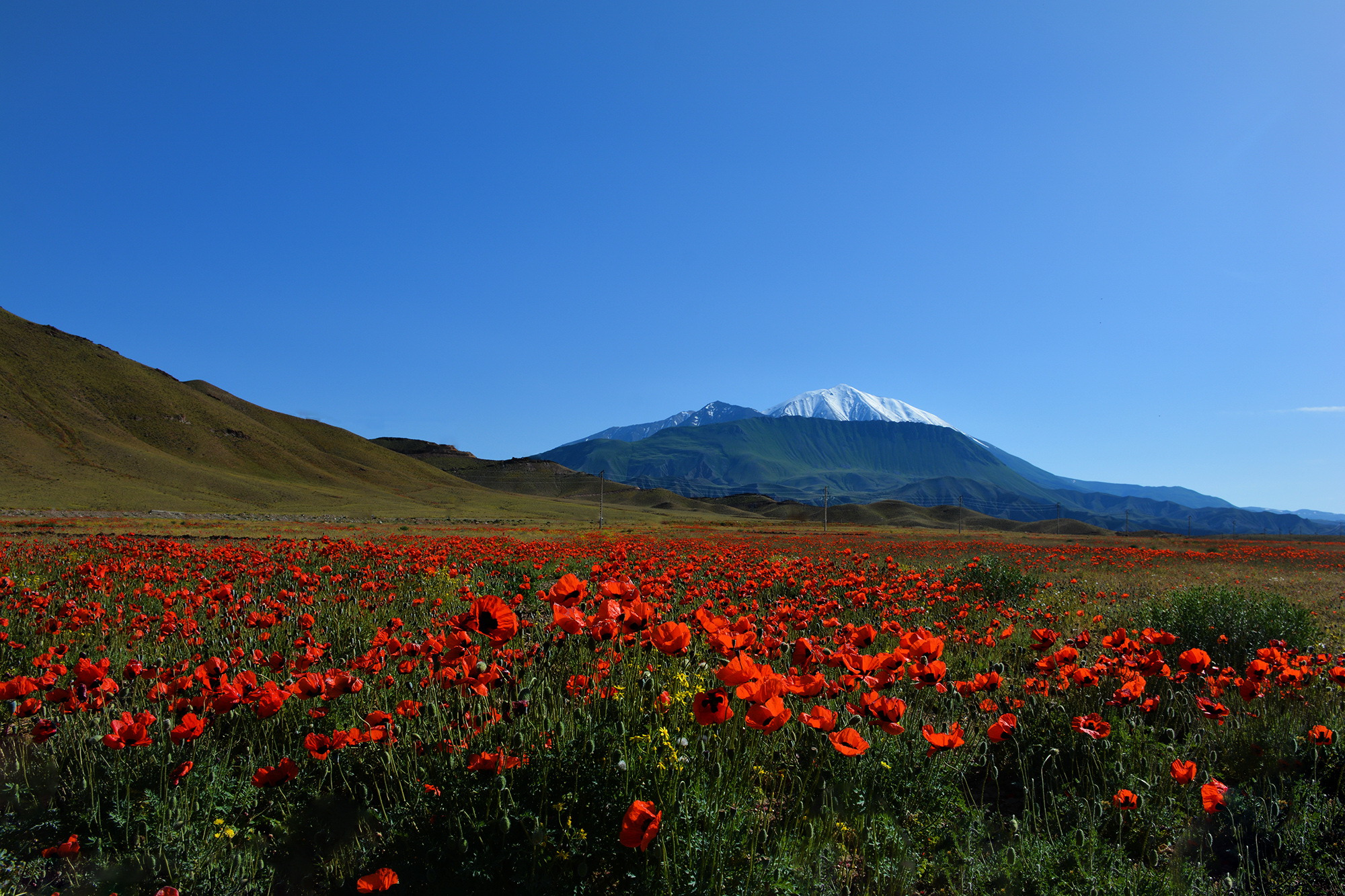
- Field of anemones near Jolfa

- Location of Jolfa County in East Azerbaijan province (top left, green)

- Location of East Azerbaijan province in Iran
- Coordinates: 38°49′N 45°54′E
- Country: Iran
- Province: East Azerbaijan
- Established: 1995
- Capital: Jolfa
- Districts: Central, Siah Rud

Population (2016)
  - Total: 61,358
- Time zone: UTC+3:30 (IRST)

Jolfa County (Persian: شهرستان جلفا) is in East Azerbaijan province, Iran. Its capital is the city of Jolfa.

== Demographics ==
=== Population ===
At the time of the 2006 National Census, the county's population was 52,176 in 14,186 households. The following census in 2011 counted 55,166 people in 16,103 households. The 2016 census measured the population of the county as 61,358 in 19,443 households.

=== Administrative divisions ===
Jolfa County's population history and administrative structure over three consecutive censuses are shown in the following table.

Jolfa County Population
Administrative Divisions	2006	2011	2016
Central District	43,669	46,730	53,352
Daran RD	1,566	1,533	1,571
Ersi RD	4,779	4,250	4,589
Shoja RD	4,499	4,744	4,036
Hadishahr (city)	27,842	30,575	34,346
Jolfa (city)	4,983	5,628	8,810
Siah Rud District	8,507	8,436	8,006
Dizmar-e Gharbi RD	3,437	3,467	3,191
Nowjeh Mehr RD	3,716	3,416	3,267
Siah Rud (city)	1,354	1,553	1,548
Total	52,176	55,166	61,358
RD = Rural District

== See also ==
Media related to Jolfa County at Wikimedia Commons
