= Chapel of Dzordzor =

Armenian Apostolic chapel in Iran

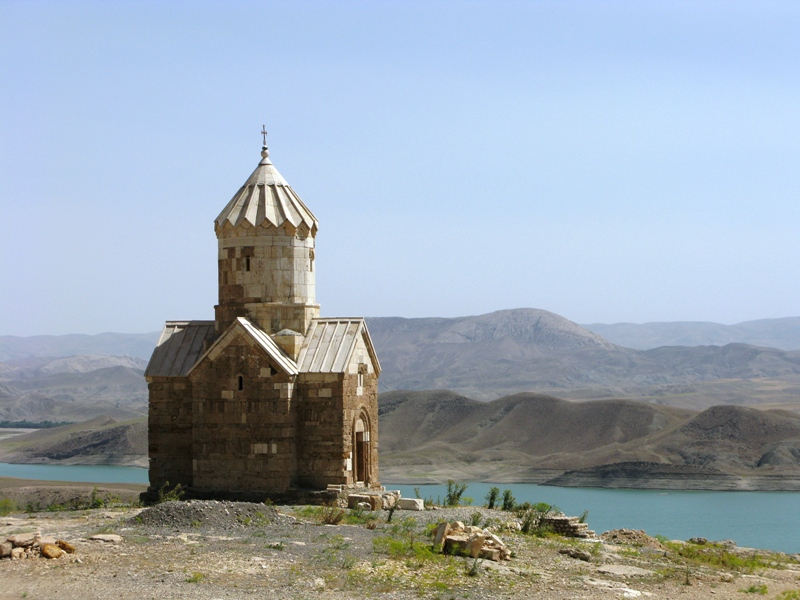
- Chapel of Dzordzor on the Zangmar River Reservoir

- Location within Iran

Religion
- Affiliation: Armenian Apostolic Church

Location
- Location: Maku County, West Azarbaijan Province, Iran
- Interactive map of Chapel of Dzordzor
- Coordinates: 39°11′16″N 44°28′34″E

Architecture
- Type: Chapel
- Completed: 14th century
- UNESCO World Heritage Site
- Official name: Armenian Monastic Ensembles of Iran
- Type: Cultural
- Criteria: ii, iii, vi
- Designated: 2008 (32nd session)
- Reference no.: 1262
- Region: Asia-Pacific

The Chapel of Dzordzor (Armenian: Ծոր Ծորի Սուրբ Աստվածածնի մատուռ, Azerbaijani: Zurzur kilsəsi, Persian: کلیسای زور زور) is part of an Armenian monastery located in Maku County, West Azerbaijan province, Iran, on Zangmar River near the village of Barun. The monastery had its heyday in the fourteenth century before being abandoned and destroyed in the early seventeenth century, when Shah Abbas I decided to displace the local Armenians.

The Chapel of Holy Mother of God is the only part of the monastery that still stands today. The construction of this chapel cross surmounted in the center of a drum dome dates back to the 14th century, although some sources refer to 9th–10th centuries. In agreement with the Armenian Apostolic Church, the building was relocated 600 meters by the Iranian authorities in 1987–1988, following the decision to build a dam on the Zangmar River, to avoid being inundated in the dam reservoir.

The chapel is on the World Heritage List of UNESCO since July 6, 2008, alongside St. Thaddeus and St. Stepanos monasteries under the name Armenian Monastic Ensembles of Iran.

== History ==
The construction date of this chapel is estimated to be between 1315 AD and 1342 AD. The construction was ordered by the bishop of the Saint Thaddeus monastery named Zecharia who was from a local noble landowning family.

== Architecture ==
The chapel is shaped like a cross, 7.20 meters in length and 5.10 meters in width, and has a height of 12.58 meters. Like most of the Armenian churches of that era, this chapel is constructed with cut stones of varied sizes, and has very simple exterior decorations.

== Gallery ==
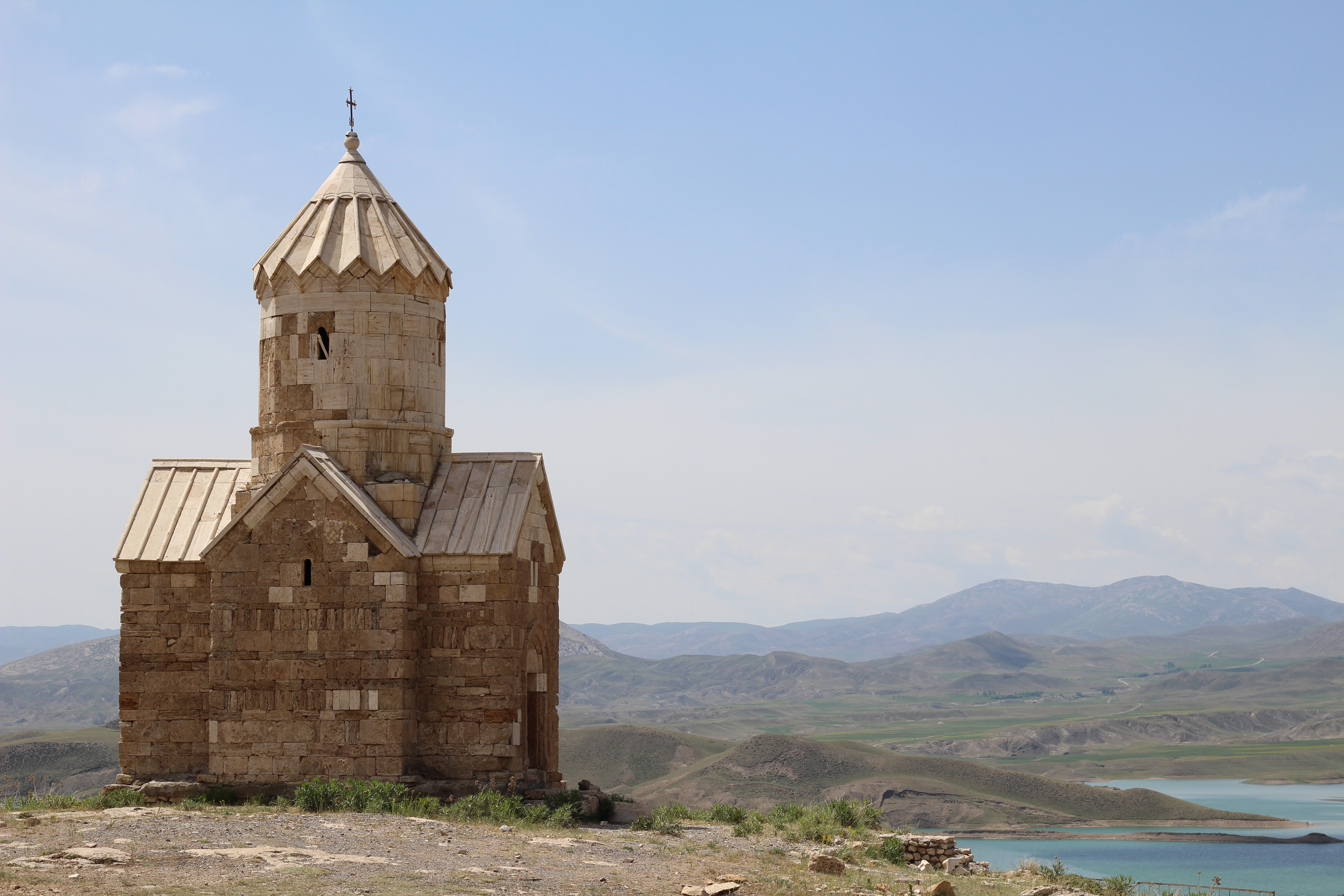

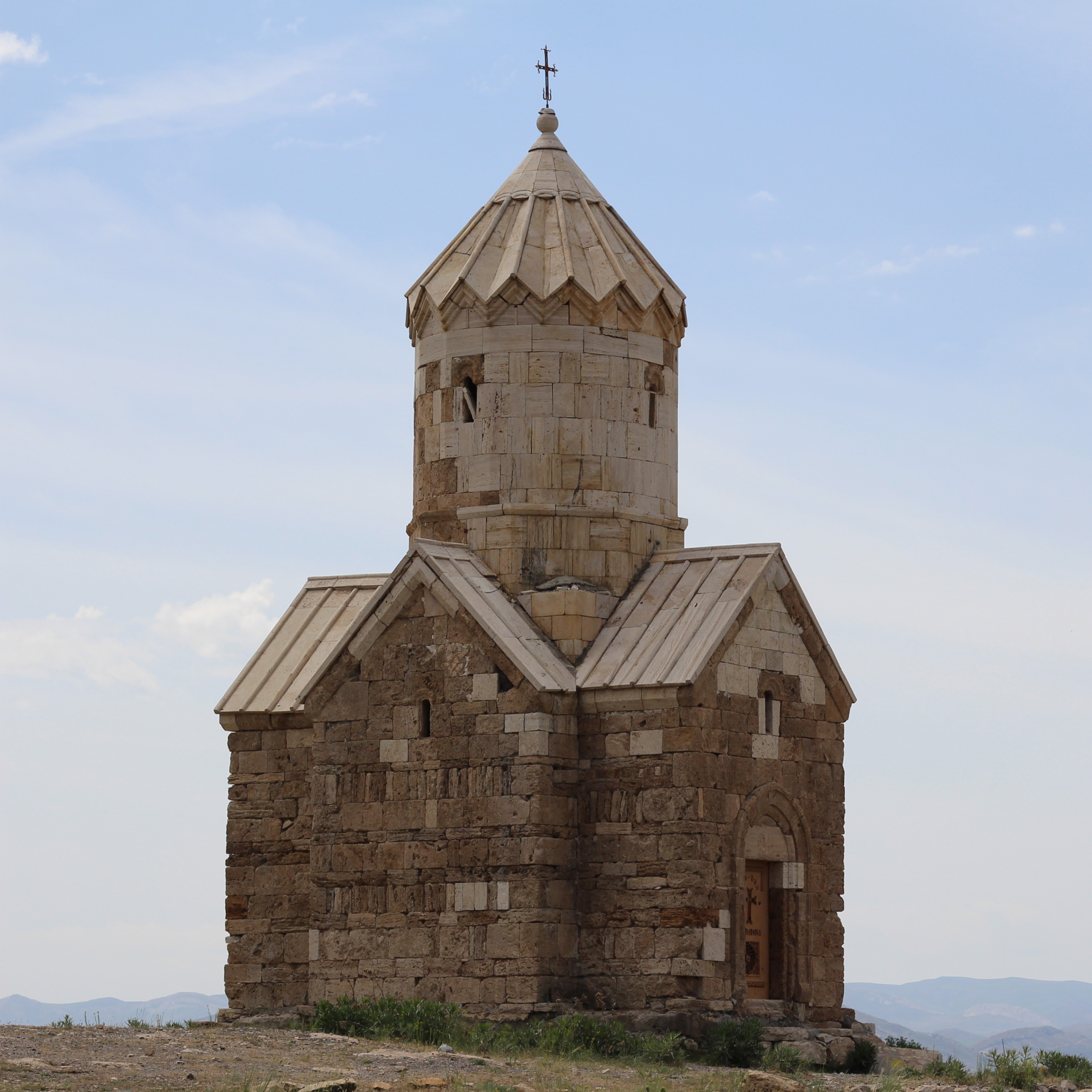

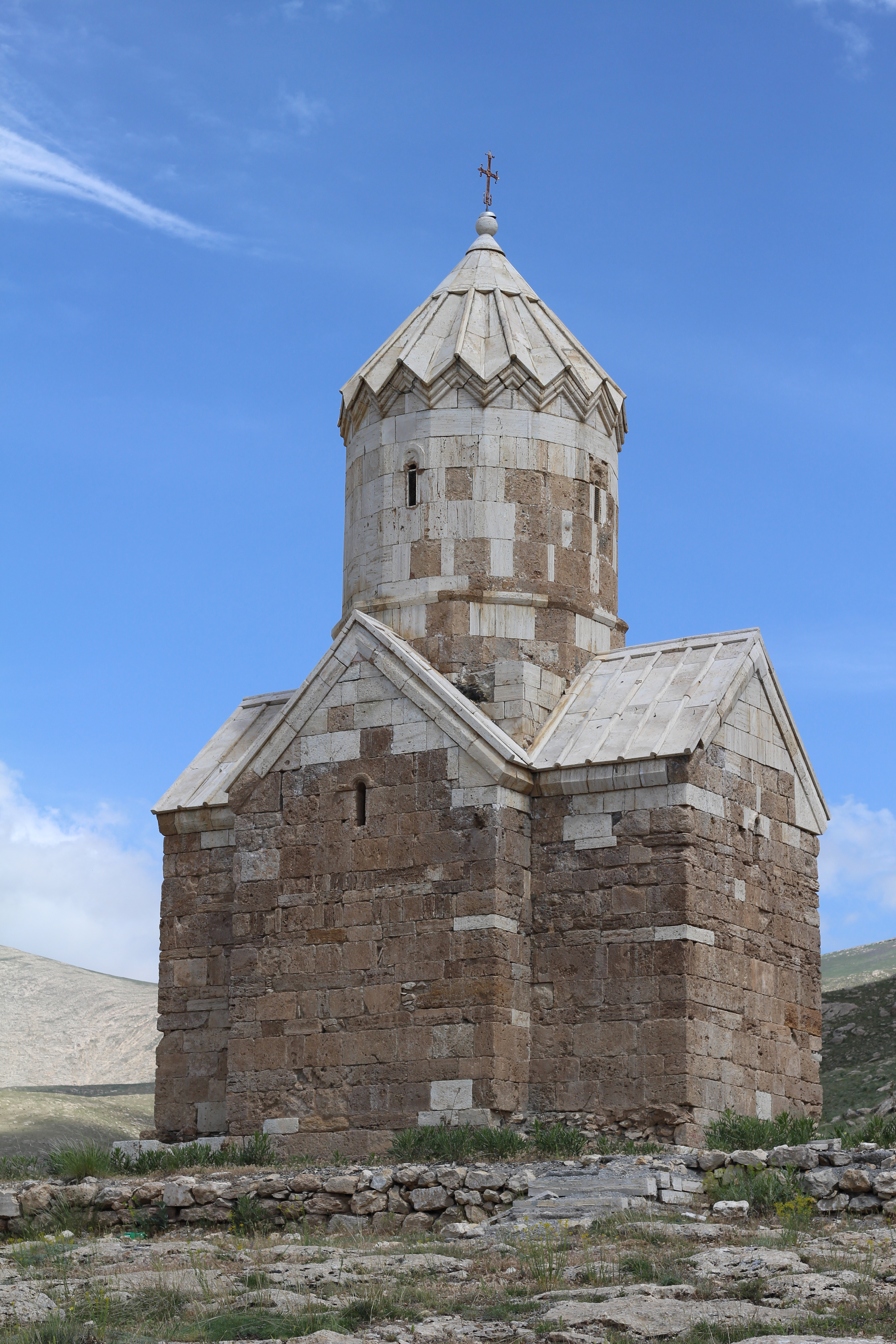

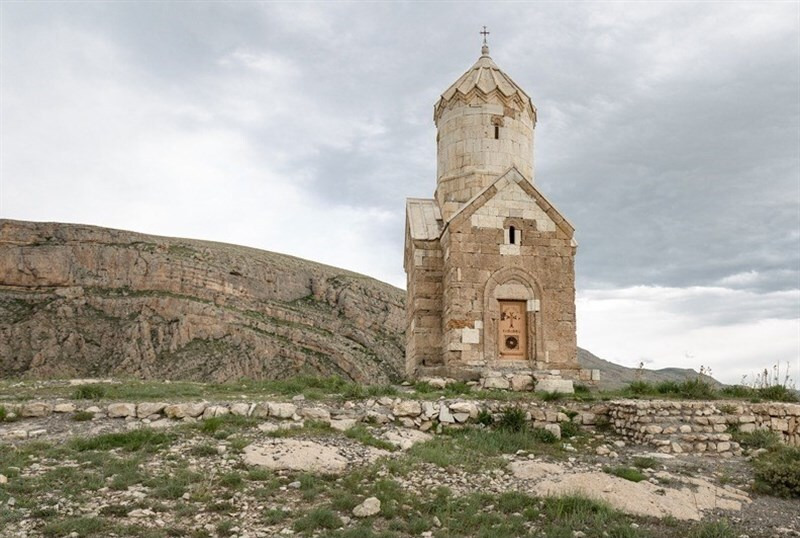

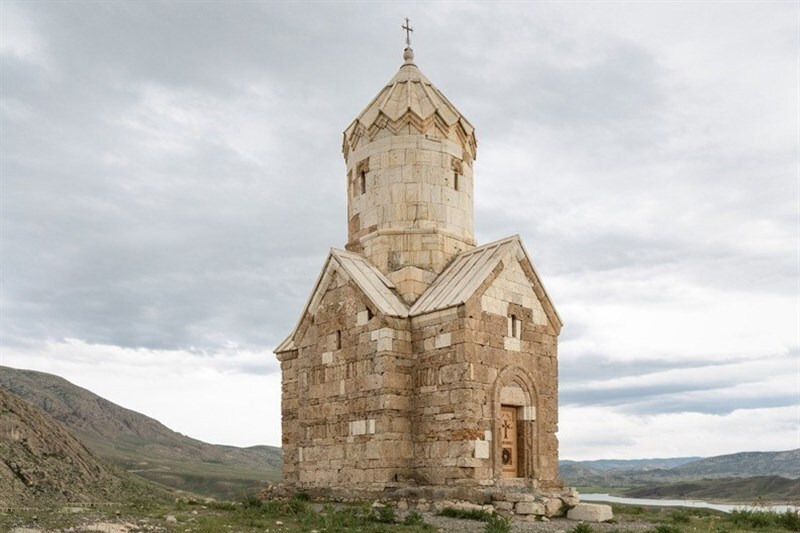

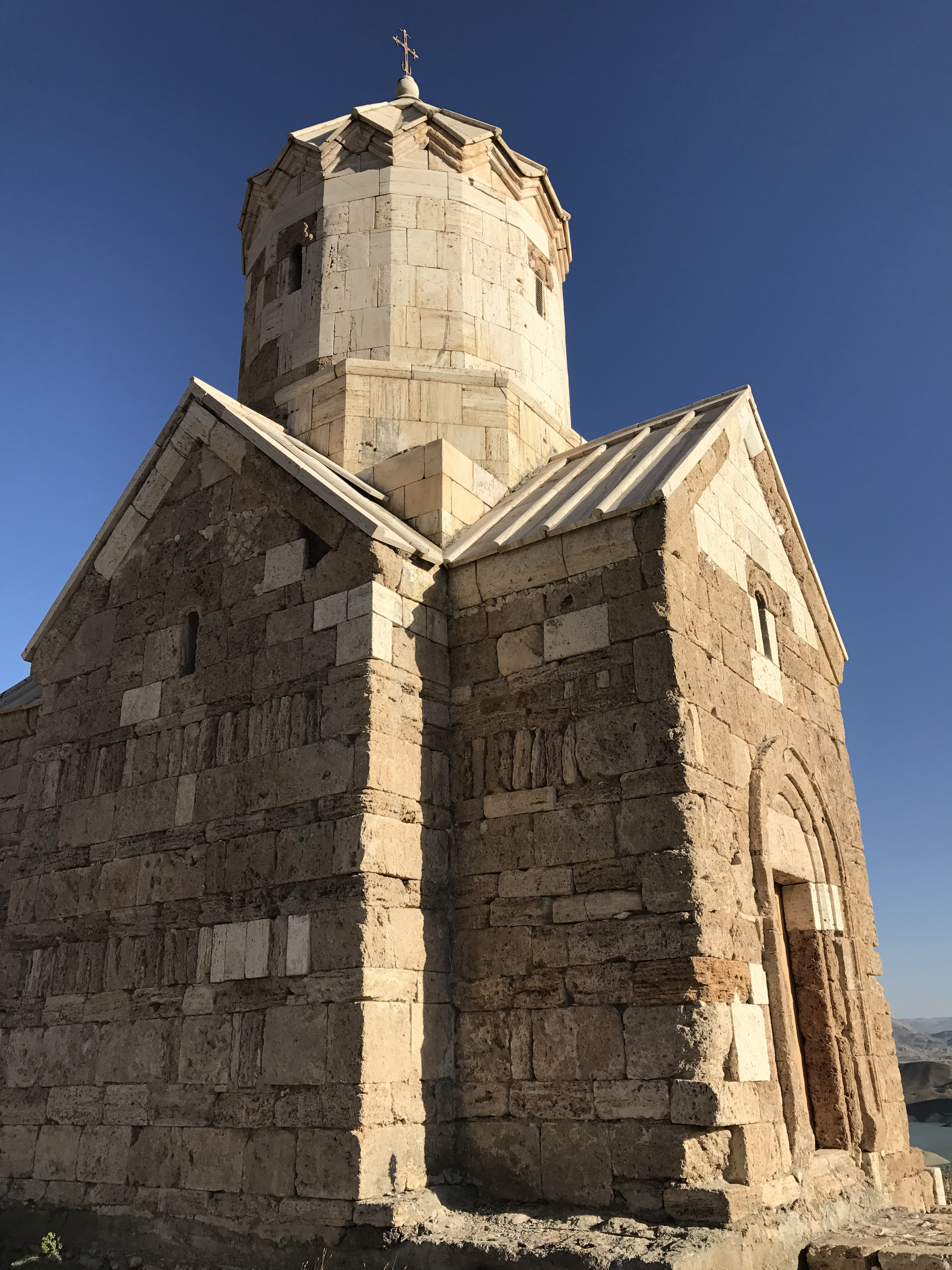

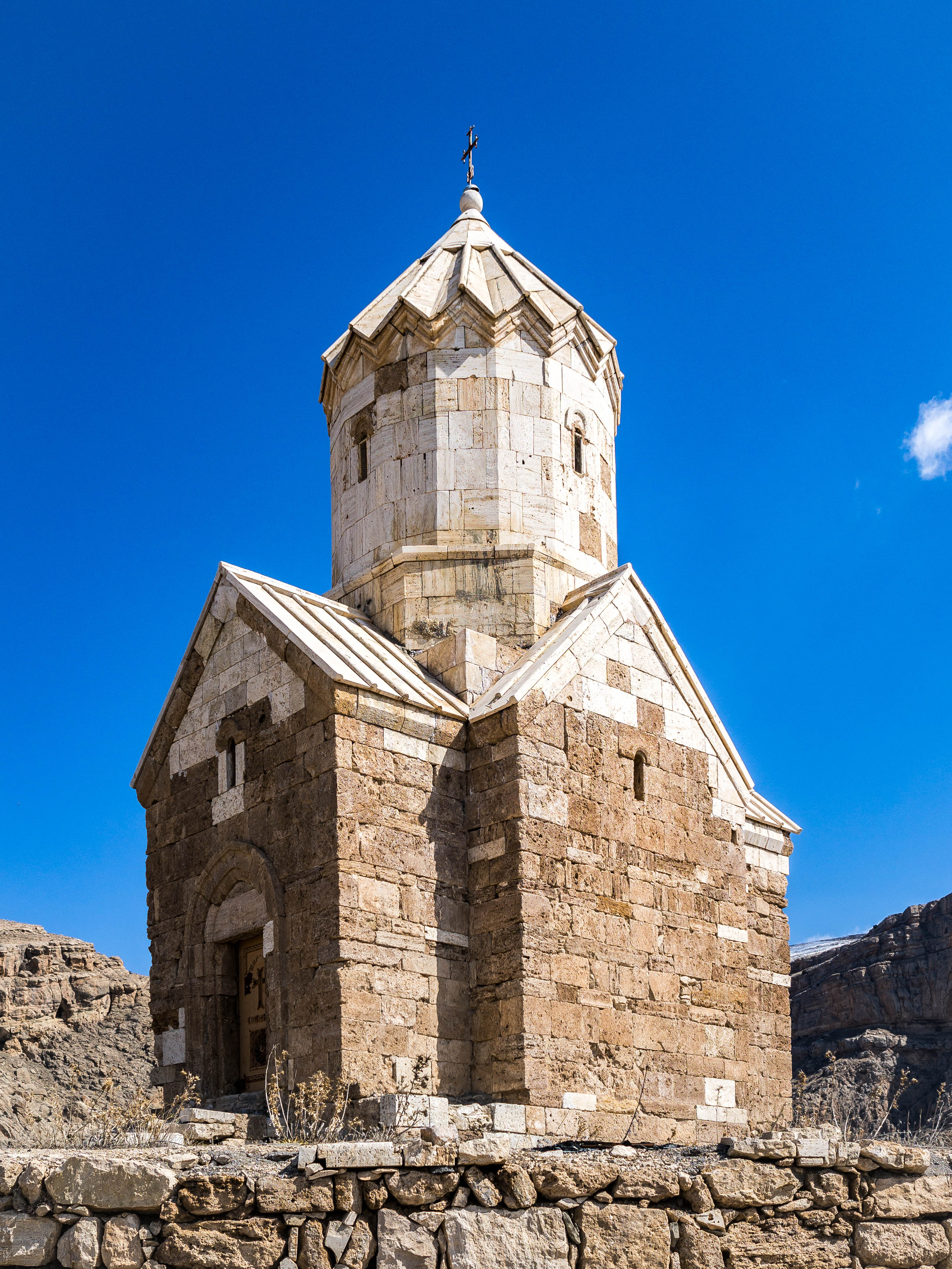

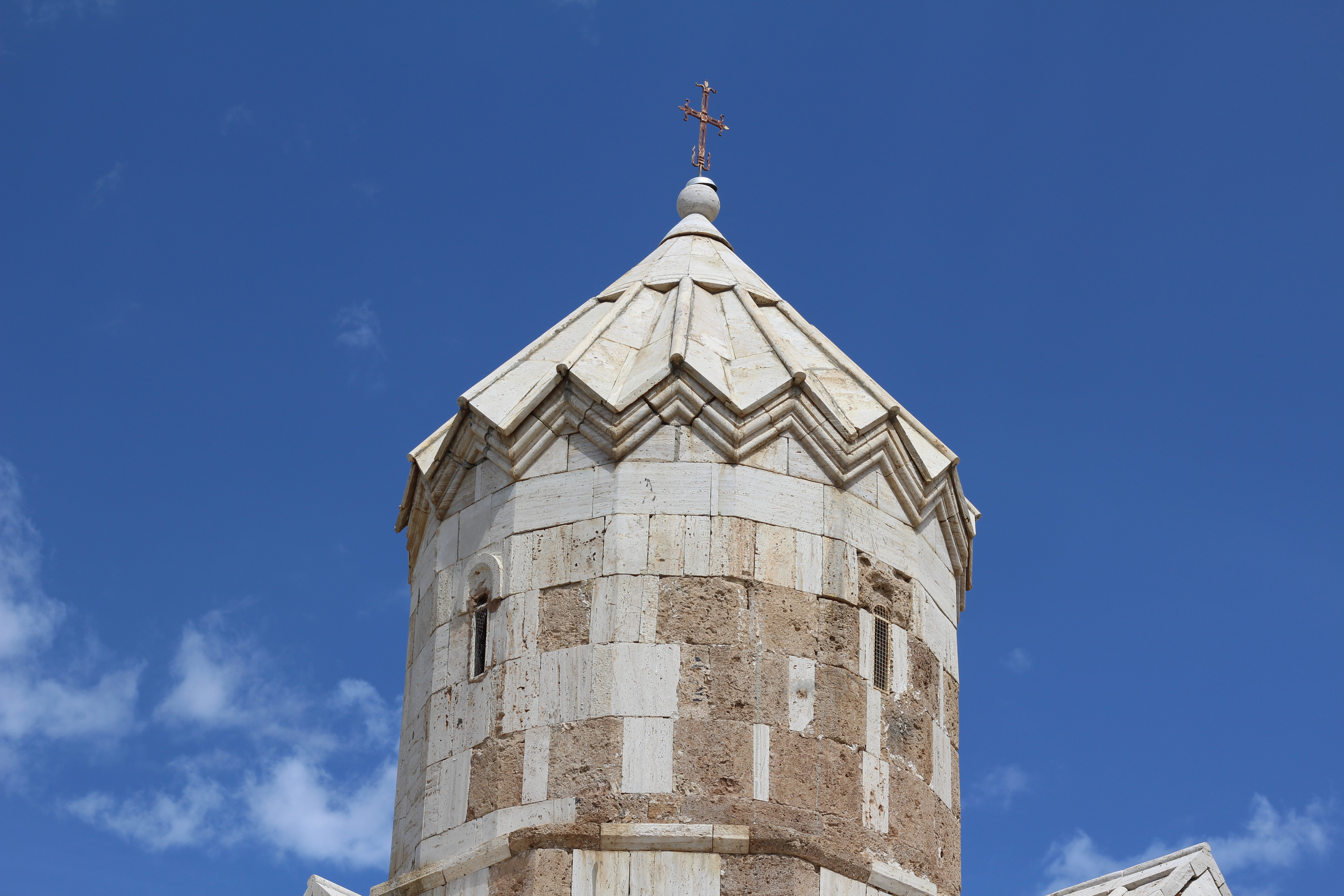

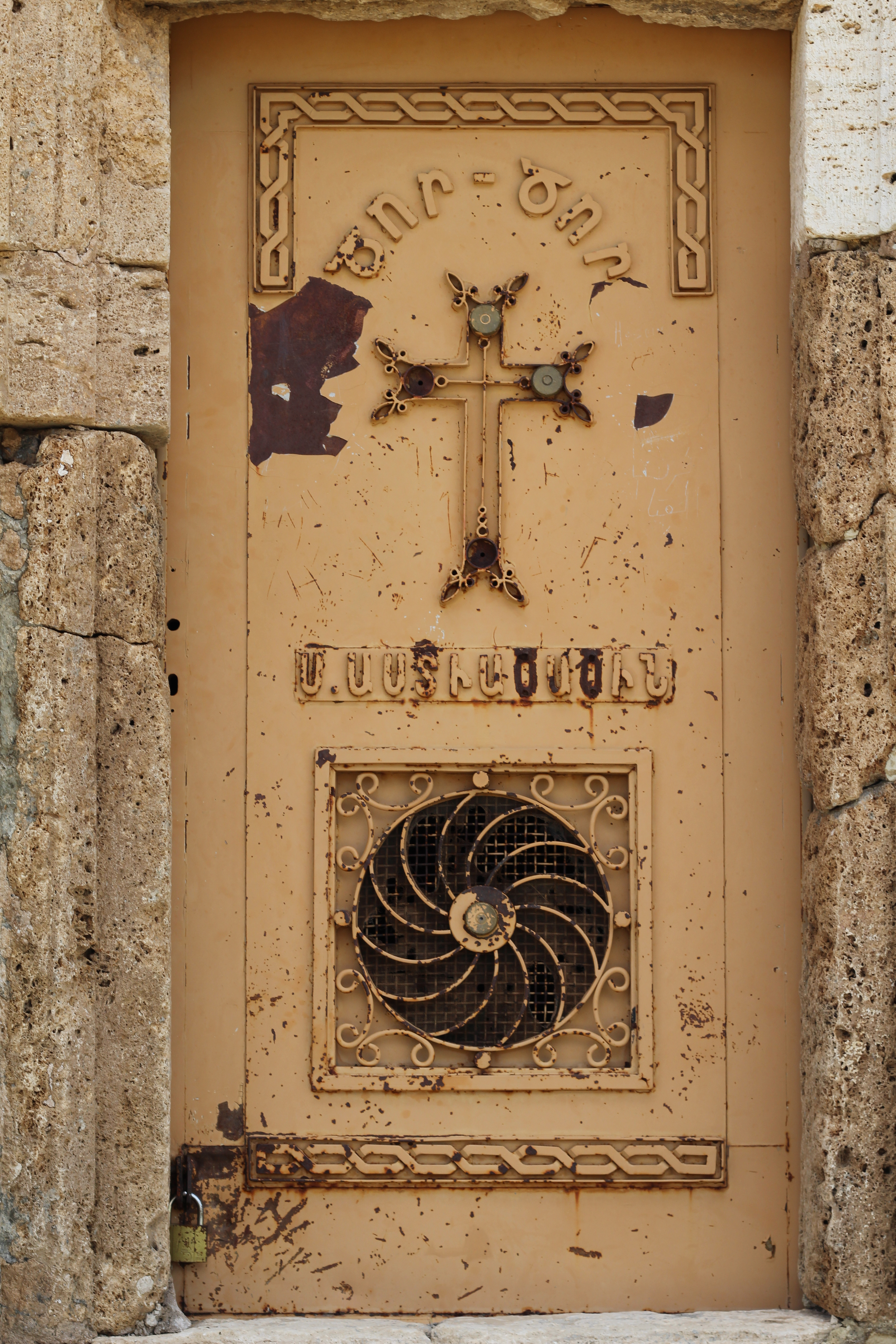

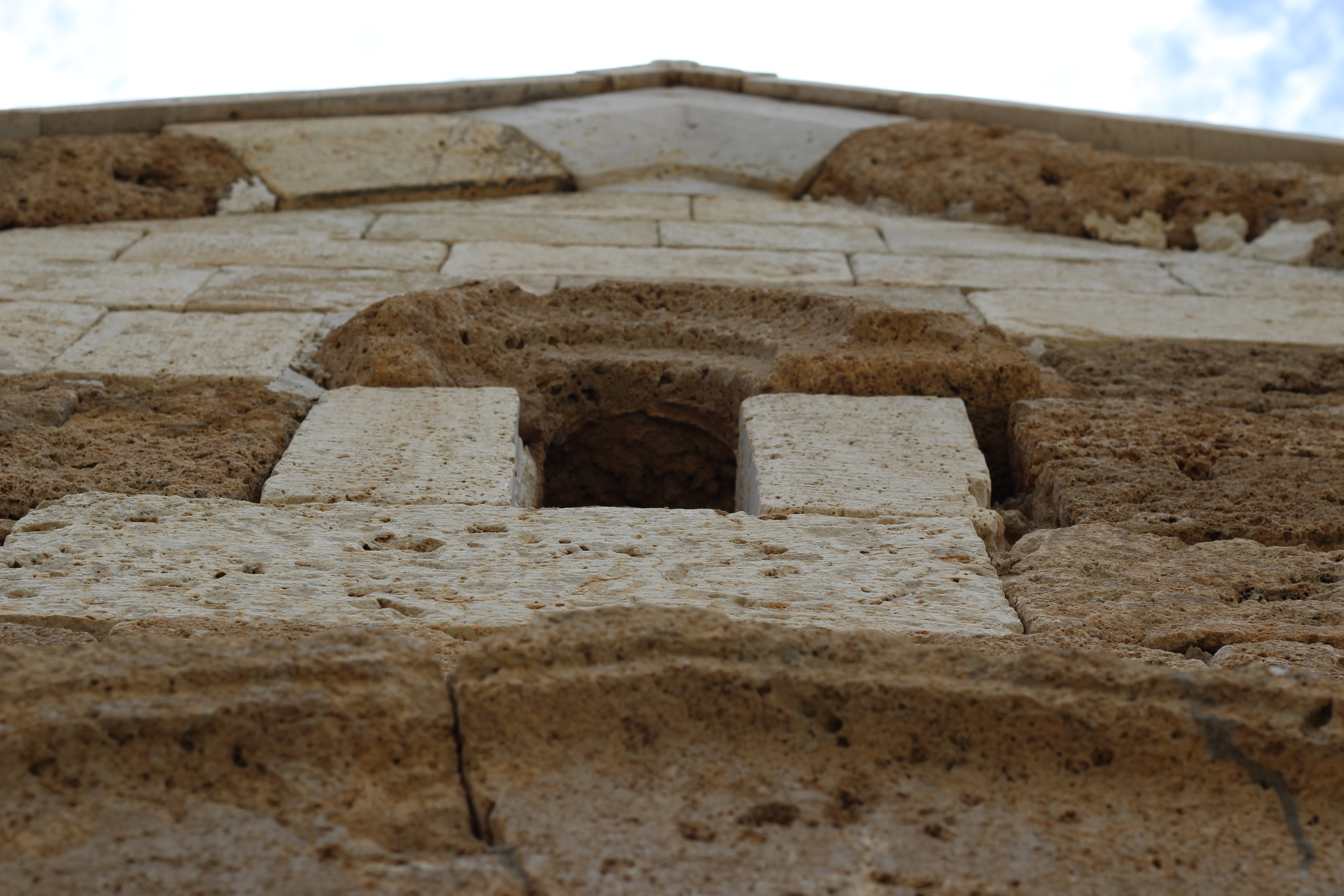

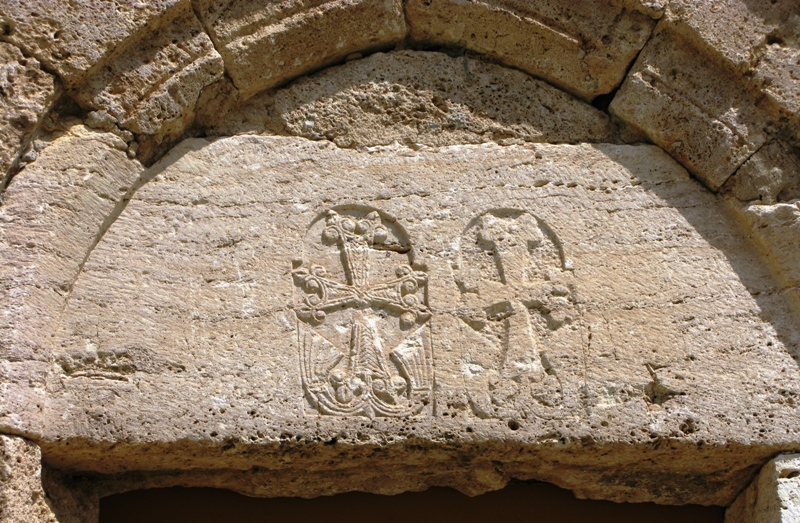

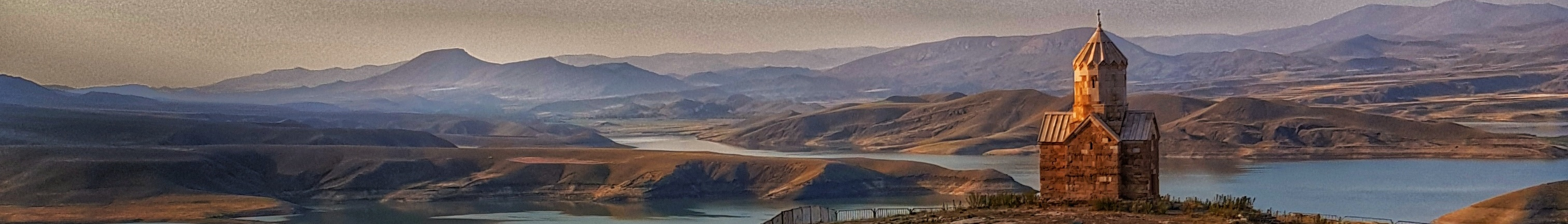

== Relocation ==
The church was relocated in 1987–1988 following the decision to build a dam on the Zangmar river, to avoid being inundated in the dam reservoir. The church was dismantled with the help of experts from Armenia, each stone and brick being assigned a number, and then rebuilt in a period of 25 days at a nearby location 600 meters away and 110 meters higher than the original site.

== See also ==
- St. Thaddeus Monastery, an Armenian monastery nearby
