= Barun, Iran =

Barun بارون
- Village
- Location within Iran
- Coordinates: 39°11′31″N 44°28′06″E
- Country: Iran
- Province: West Azerbaijan
- County: Maku
- Bakhsh: Central
- Rural District: Qaleh Darrehsi

Population (2006)
  - Total: 230
- Time zone: UTC+3:30 (IRST)
  - Summer (DST): UTC+4:30 (IRDT)

Barun (Persian: بارون, also Romanized as Bārūn; in Armenian: Բարոն) is a village in Qaleh Darrehsi Rural District, in the Central District of Maku County, West Azerbaijan Province, Iran. At the 2006 census, its population was 230, in 64 families.

== See also ==
- Chapel of Dzordzor
