= Saint Stepanos Monastery =

Armenian monastery in Iran

- Սուրբ Ստեփանոս վանք
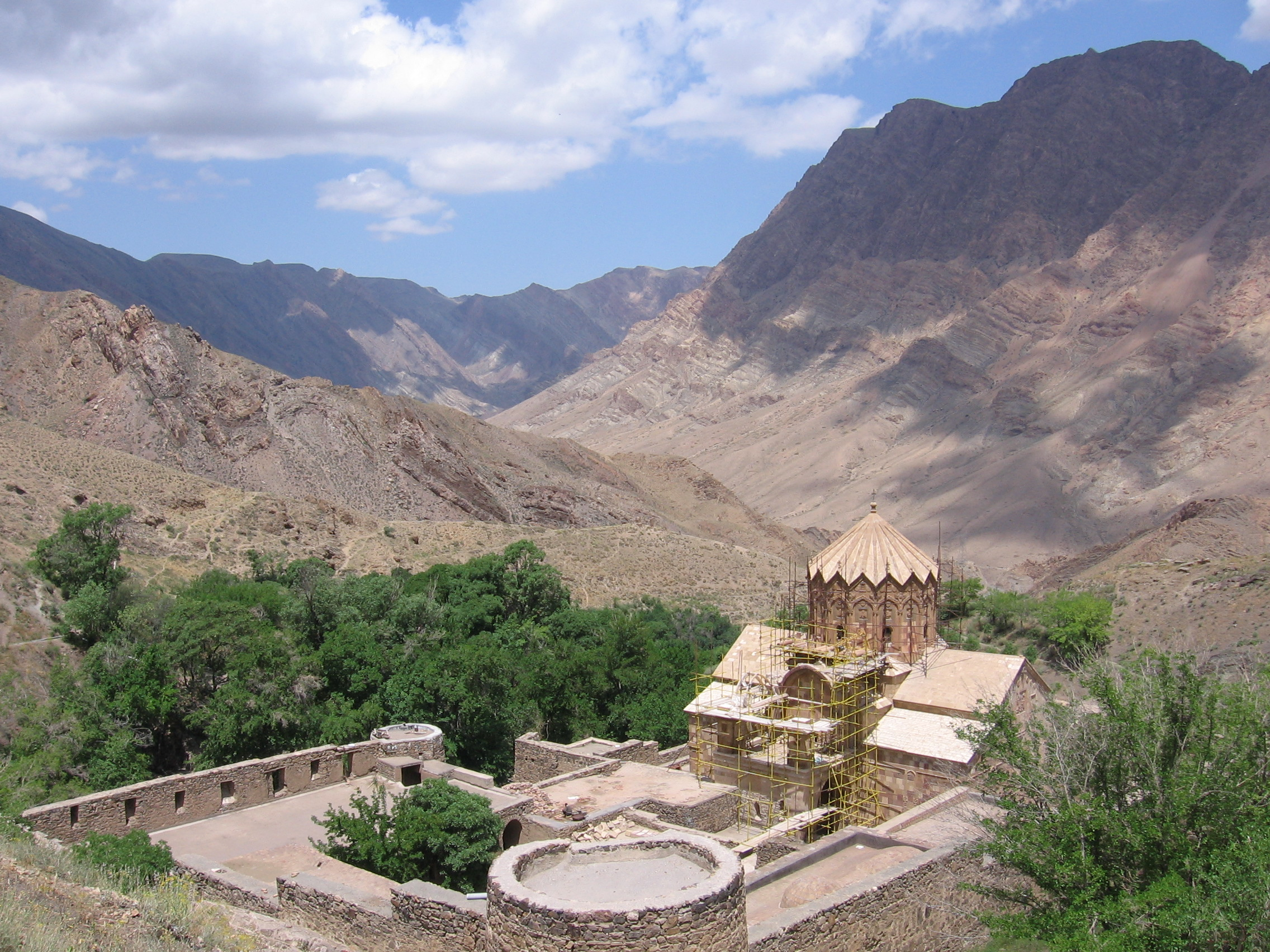

- Location within Iran

Religion
- Affiliation: Armenian Apostolic Church

Location
- Location: East Azarbaijan, Iran
- Coordinates: 38°58′45.75″N 45°28′23.71″E

Architecture
- Style: Armenian architecture
- UNESCO World Heritage Site
- Official name: Armenian Monastic Ensembles of Iran
- Type: Cultural
- Criteria: ii, iii, vi
- Designated: 2008 (32nd session)
- Reference no.: 1262
- Region: Western Asia

Iran National Heritage List
- Official name: Saint Stephen Monastery
- Type: Christian Monastery
- Designated: 1965
- Reference no.: 463
- Conservation organization: Cultural Heritage, Handicrafts and Tourism Organization of Iran

The Saint Stepanos Monastery (Armenian: Սուրբ Ստեփանոս վանք, Surb Stepanos Vank; Persian: کلیسای سنت استپانوس, Kelisā-ye Sant Estepānus), also known in Armenian as Maghardavank (Մաղարդավանք), is an Armenian monastery located about 15 km northwest of the city of Julfa in the province of East Azarbaijan, northwestern Iran. It is situated in a deep canyon along the Araxes, on the Iranian side of the border between Iran and Nakhchivan. It was originally built in the ninth century, and was rebuilt during the Safavid era, after being damaged through wars and earthquakes.

It is part of the Armenian Monastic Ensembles of Iran, which are inscribed on UNESCO's World Heritage List.

== History ==
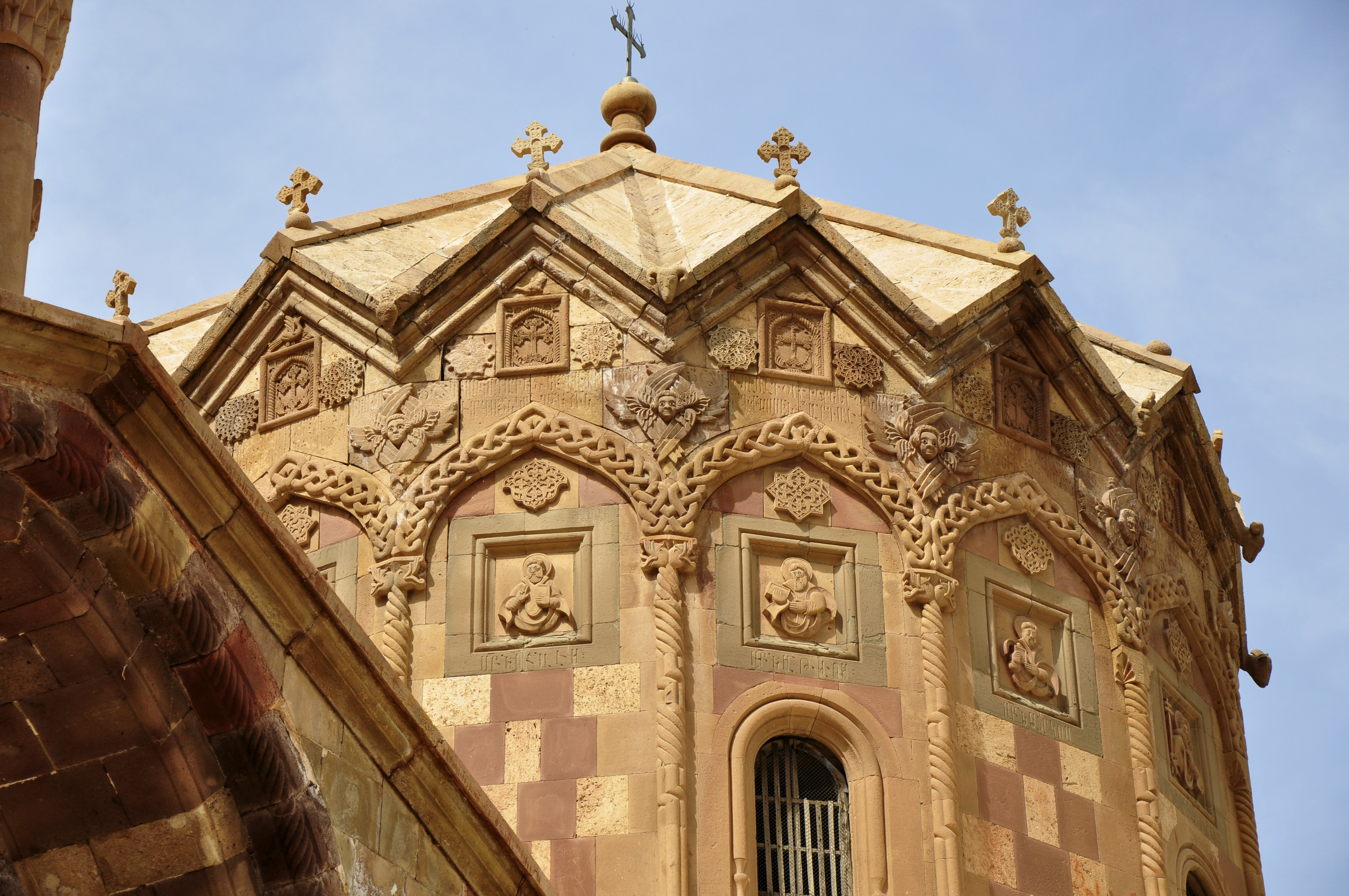

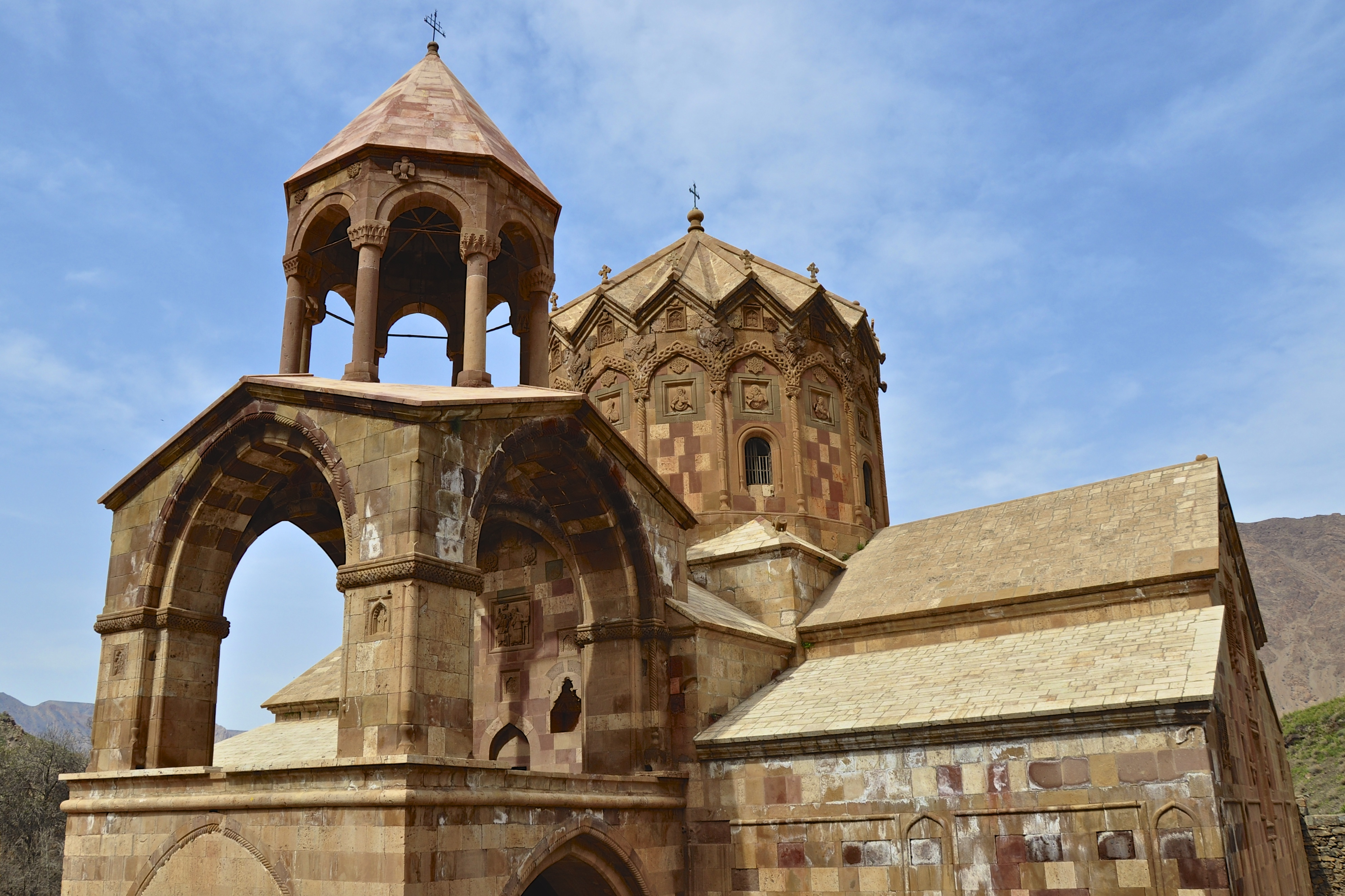
The Saint Stepanos Monastery.

Saint Bartholomew the Apostle first founded a church at the site around AD 62, during the Parthian era. The first monastery was built in the seventh century, and was later expanded in the 10th century. The monastery was damaged during the wars between the Seljuks and the Byzantine Empire in the 11th and 12th centuries.

Following the conquest of the region by the Mongols of Hulagu Khan, grandson of Genghis Khan, in the middle of the 13th century, a peace agreement was signed between the Armenian Church and the Ilkhanate, and the Christians maintained an equable situation. The monastery was restored in the second half of the 13th century, and was completely rebuilt under the leadership of Zachariah in 1330. By the 14th and 15th centuries, the Saint Stepanos Monastery was at the height of its cultural and intellectual influence, producing paintings and illuminated manuscripts in religion, history, and philosophy.

In the early 15th century, the new Safavid dynasty protected the Armenians, but the region was at the center of the conflicts with the Ottomans, who invaded Western Armenia in 1513. The monastery gradually declined in the 16th century. Abbas the Great expelled the inhabitants of the region in 1604, and the monastery was abandoned. After 1650, the Safavids reoccupied the region and the abandoned monastery was restored in the latter part of the 17th century.

At the beginning of the 18th century, the region came under the expansion of the Russian Empire. Yerevan was conquered by the Russians in 1827, and per the Treaty of Turkmenchay, the border between Iran and Russia was subsequently established on the Araxes. Consequently, part of the population was forcefully displaced to Russian Armenia. The Qajar rulers continued to protect the Armenians, and encouraged the rebuilding of the Saint Stepanos Monastery between 1819 and 1825.

The monastery underwent several restorations in the 20th century.

== Gallery ==
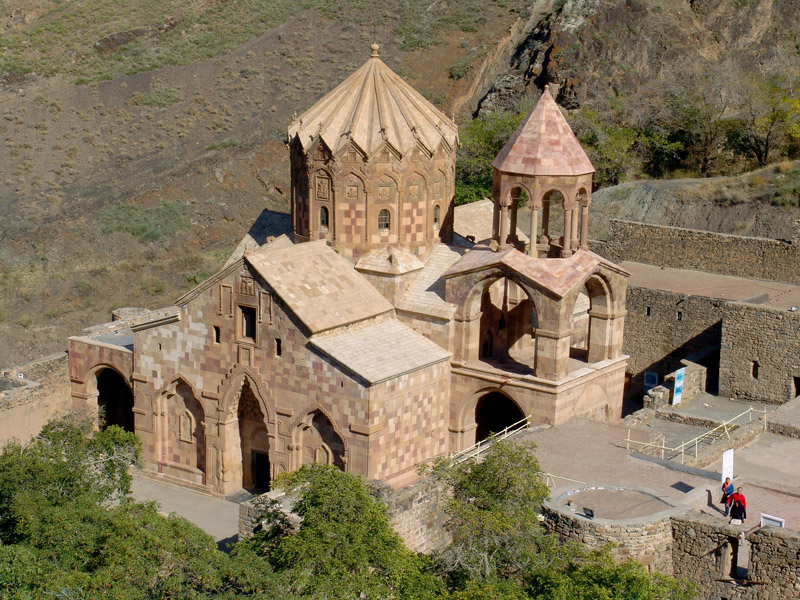
View of monastery

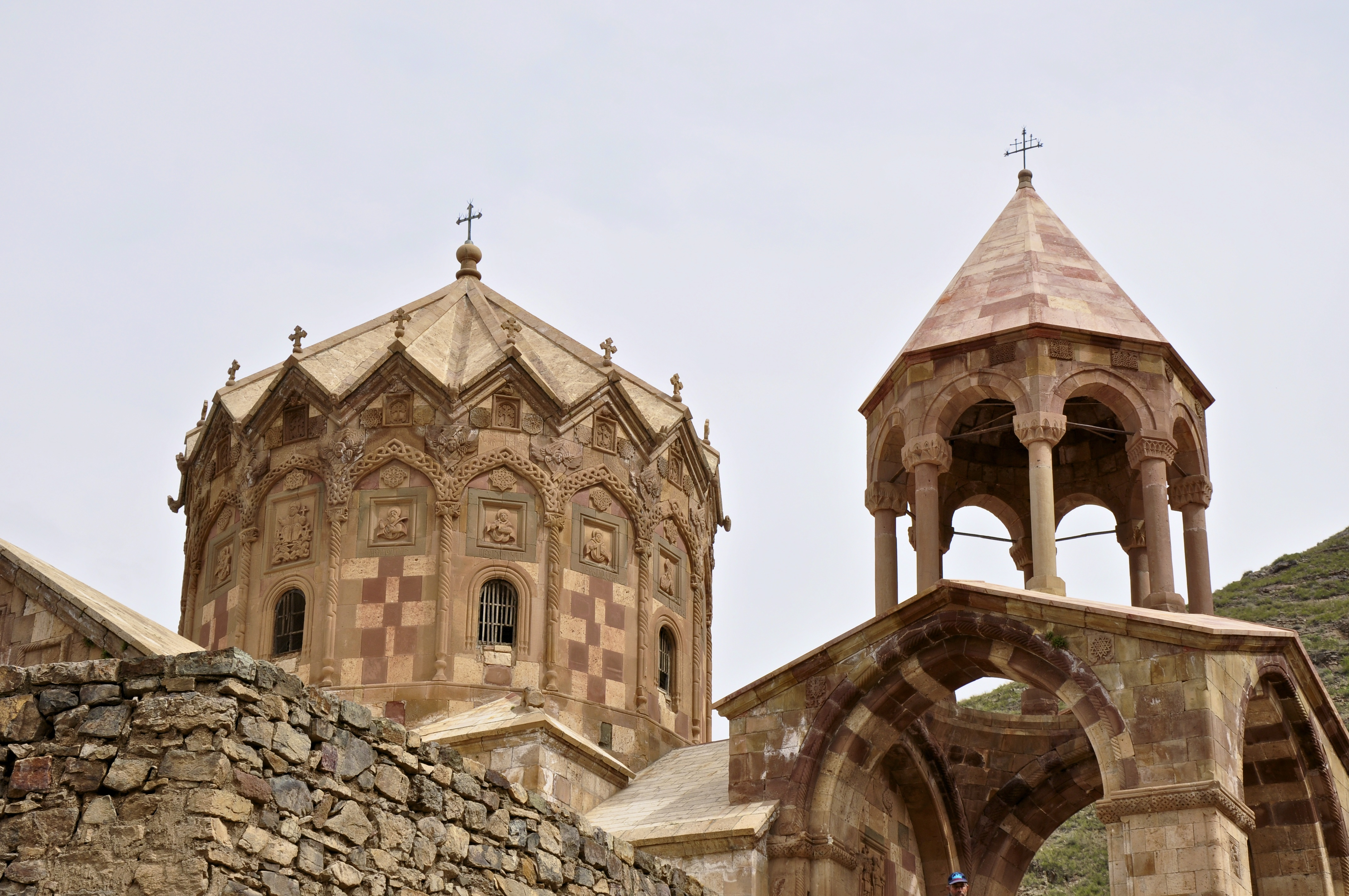
The upper coverings of the Saint Stepanos Monastery.

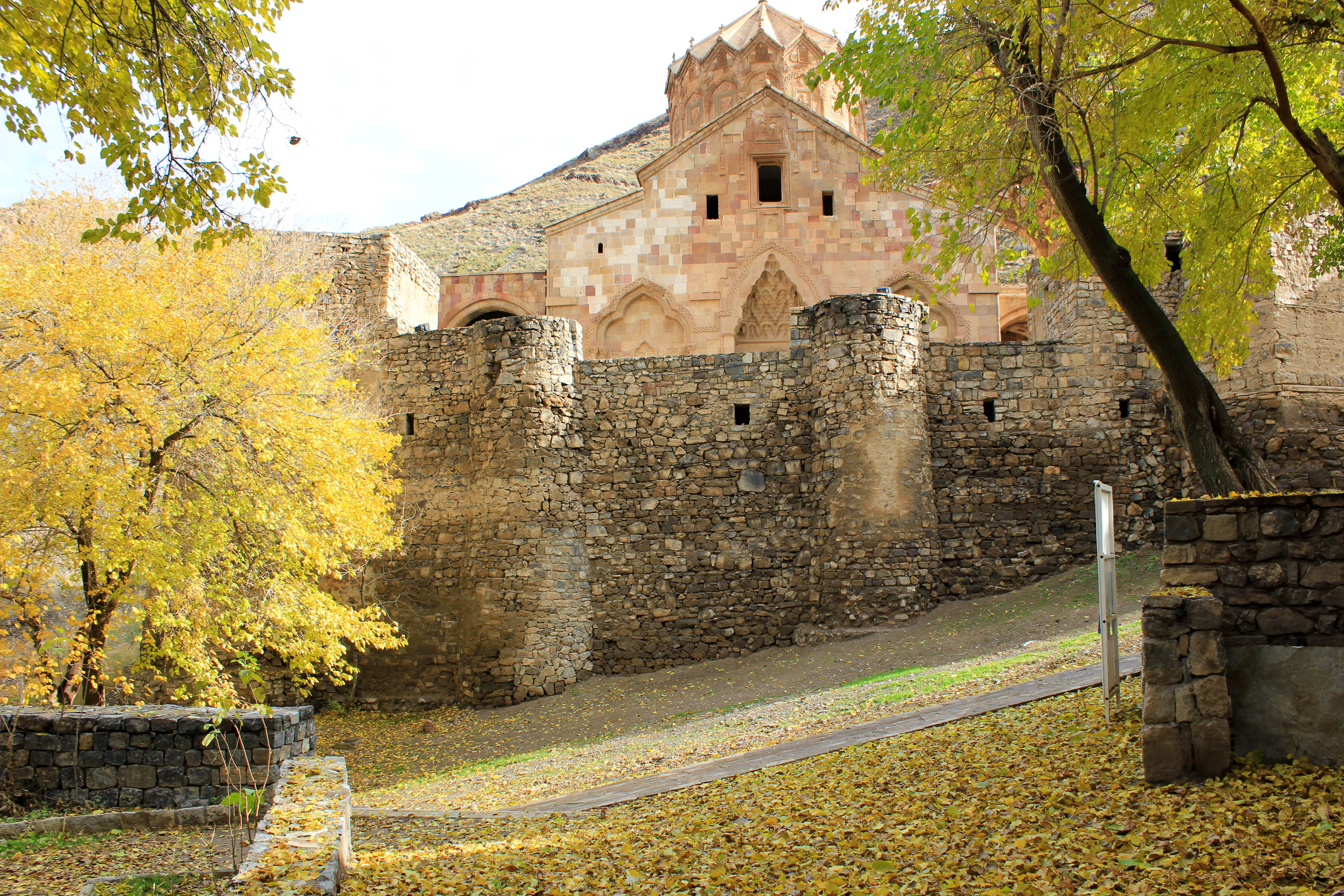

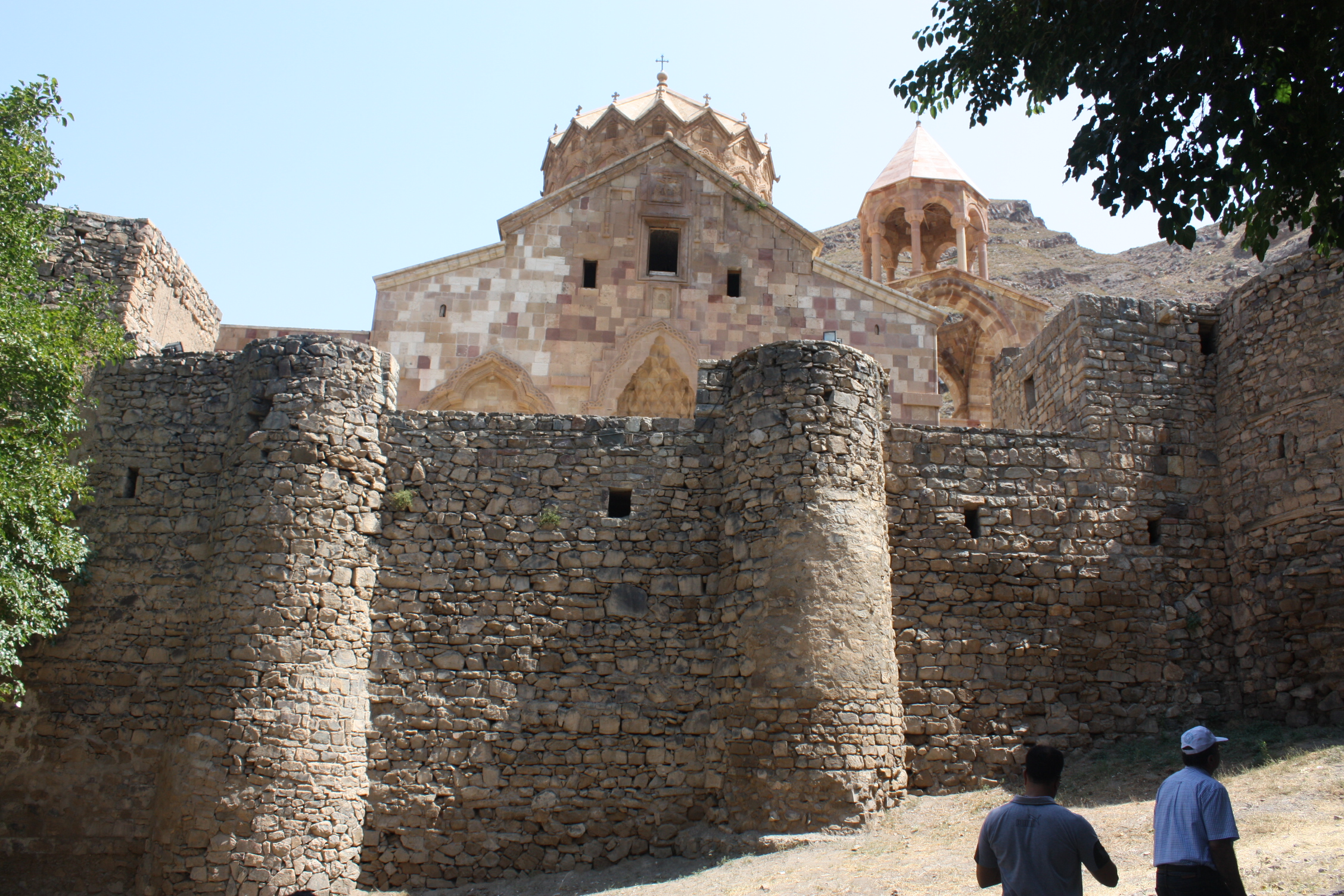

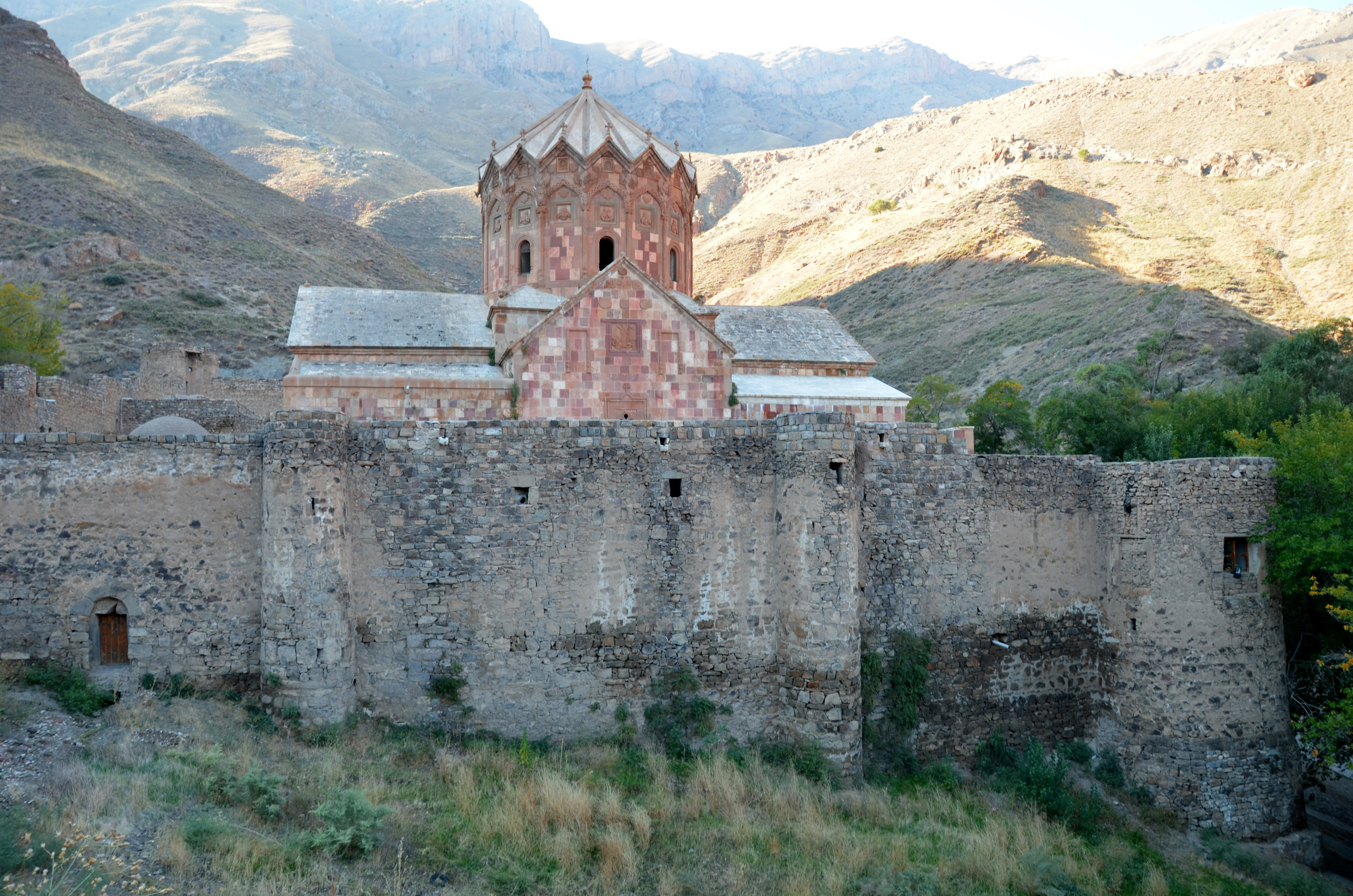

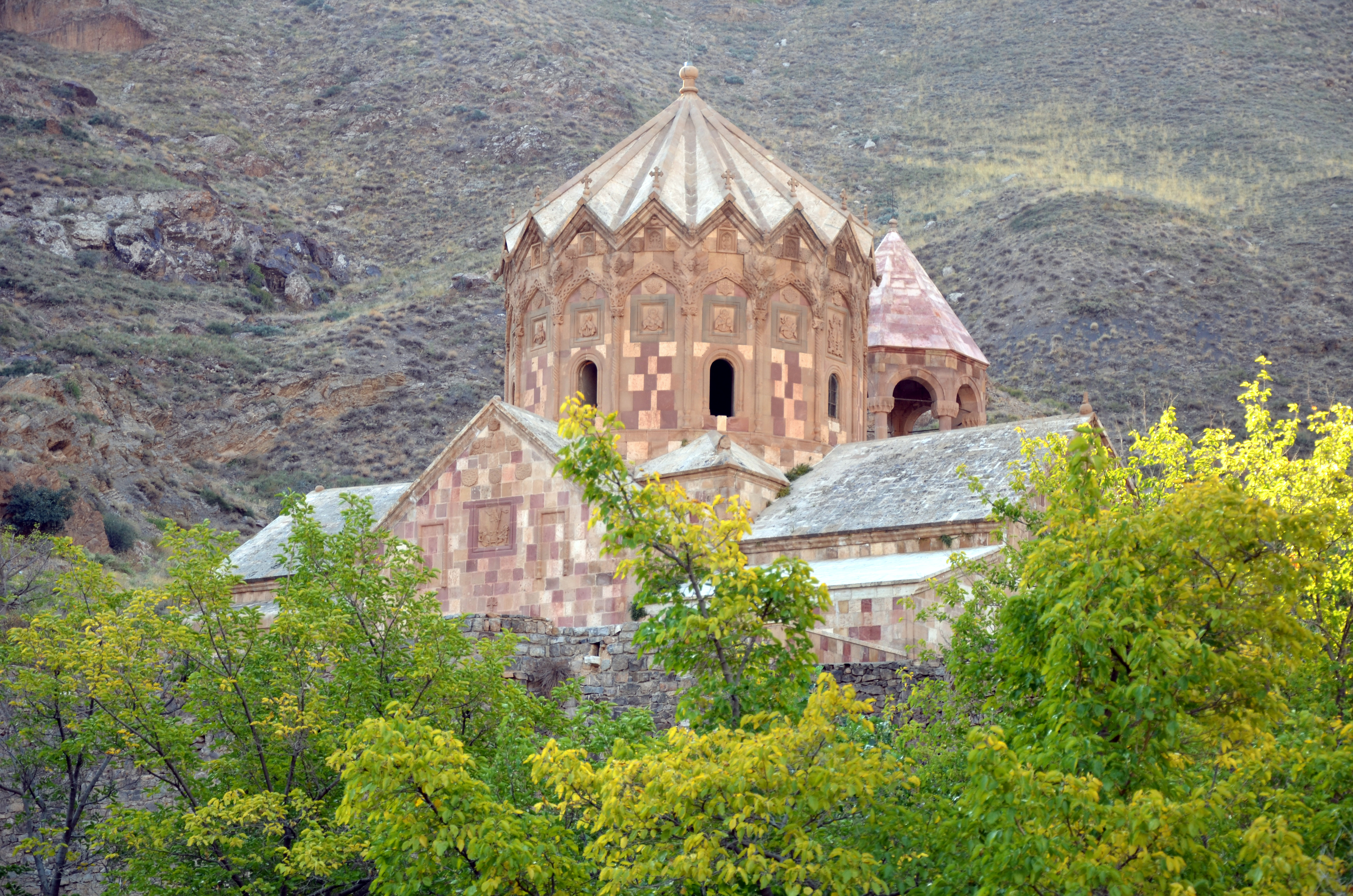

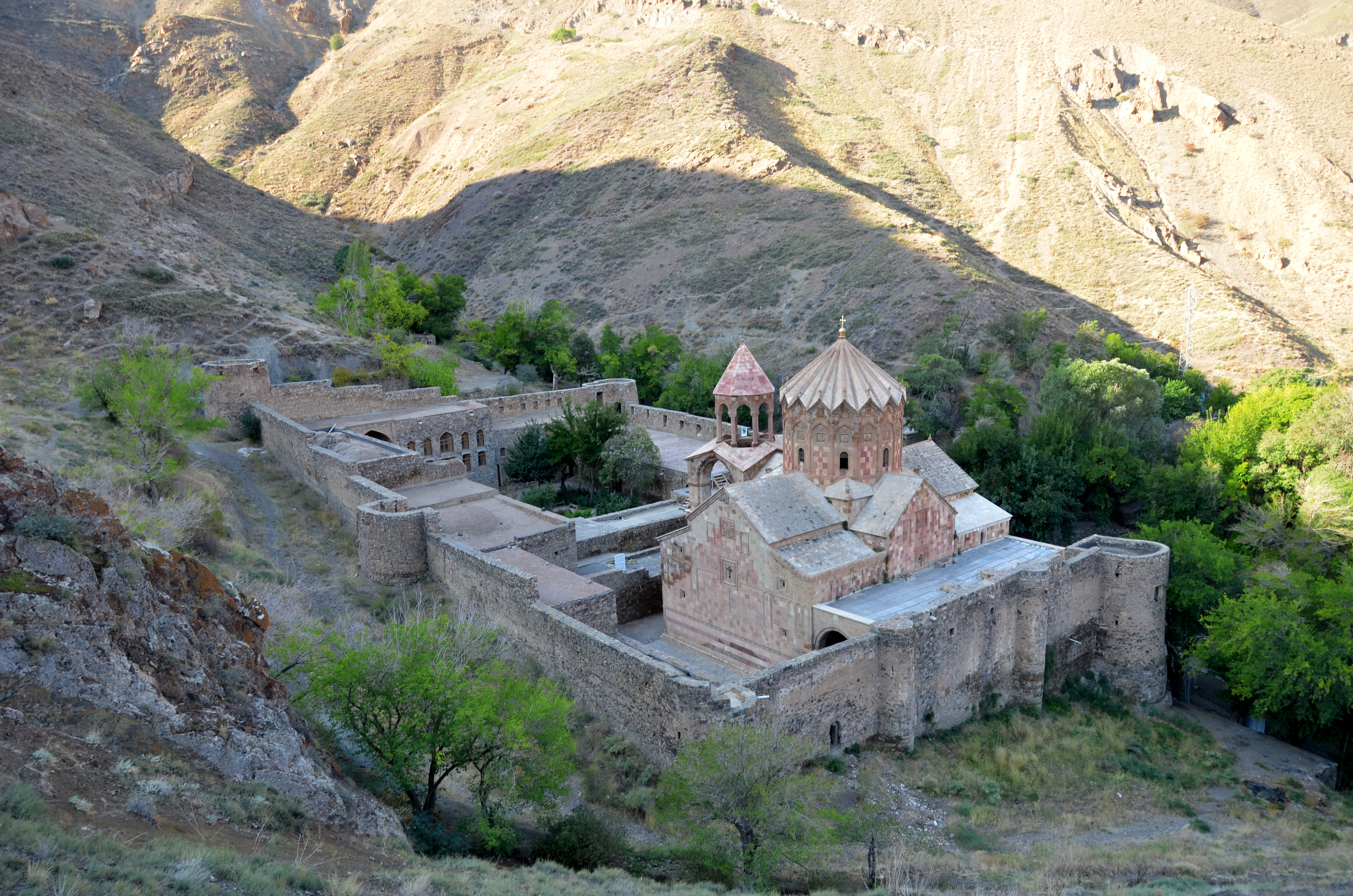

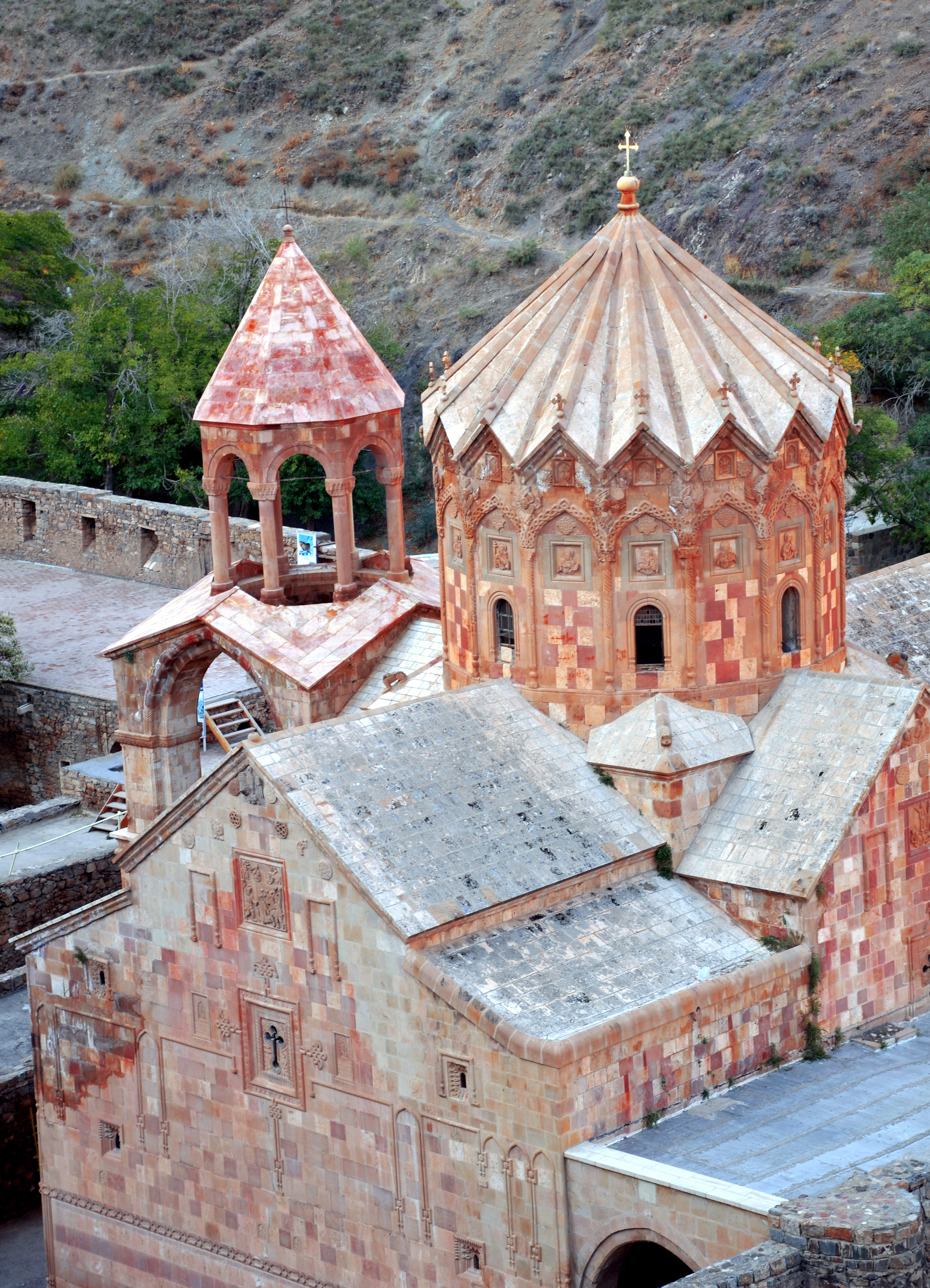

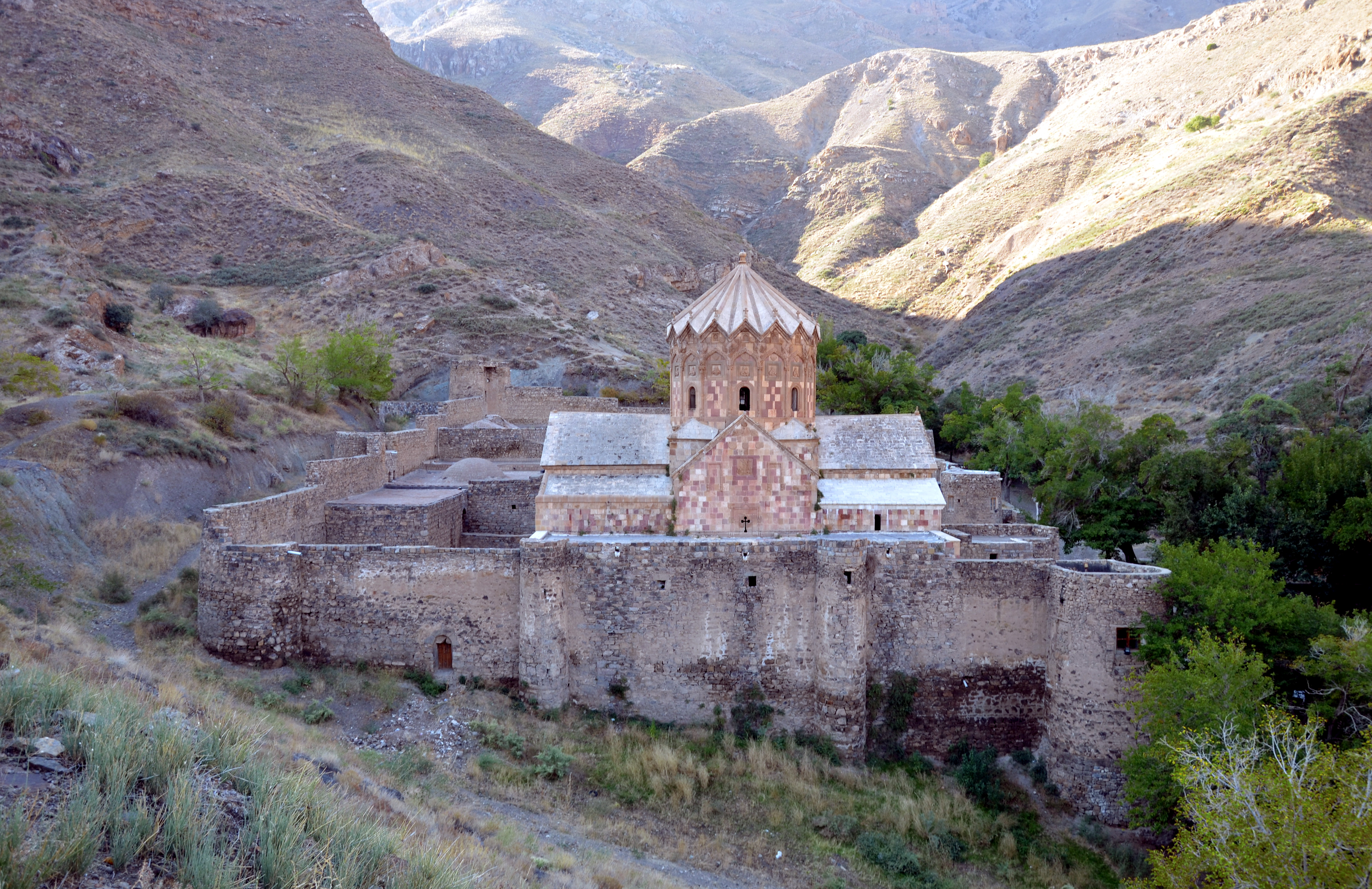

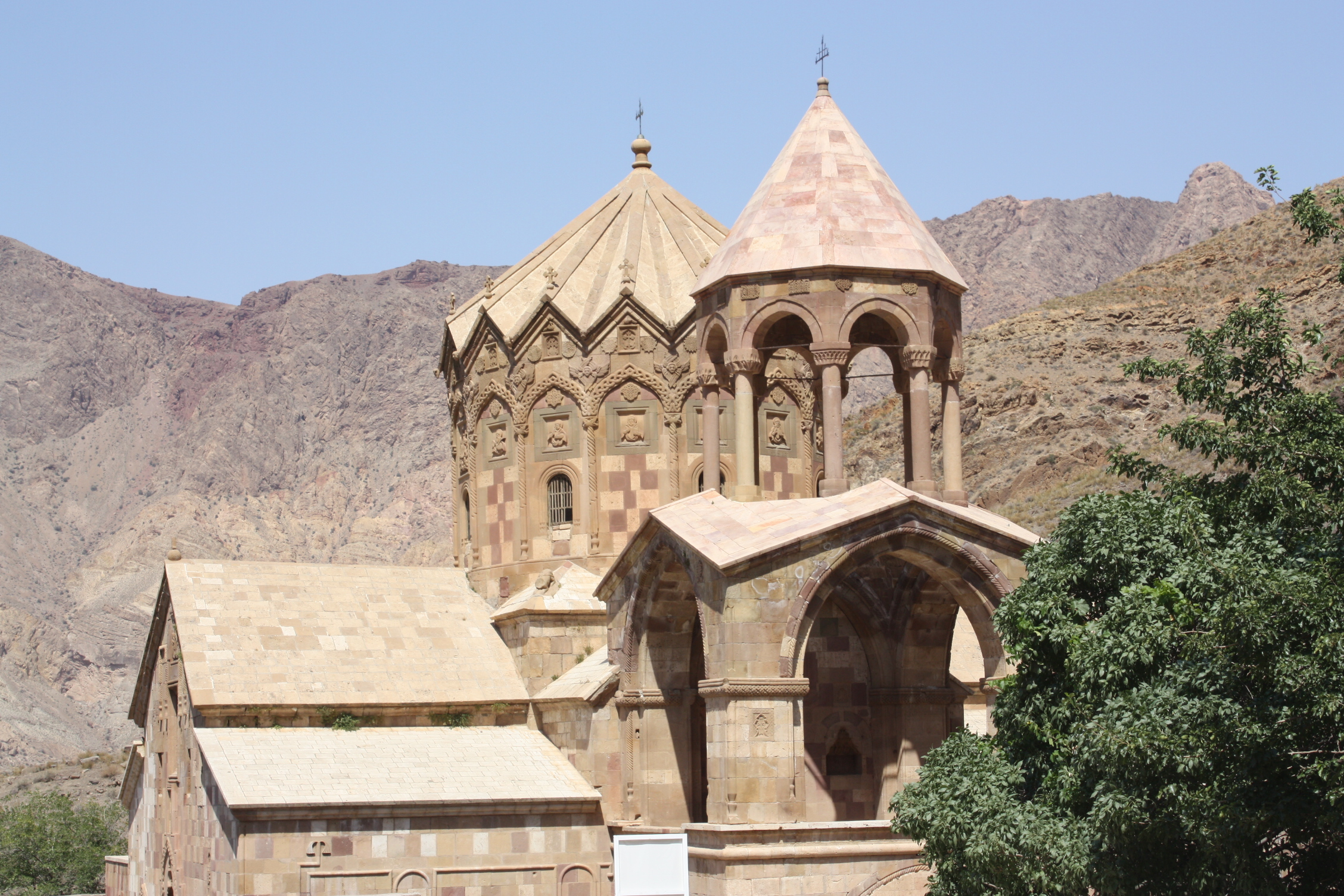

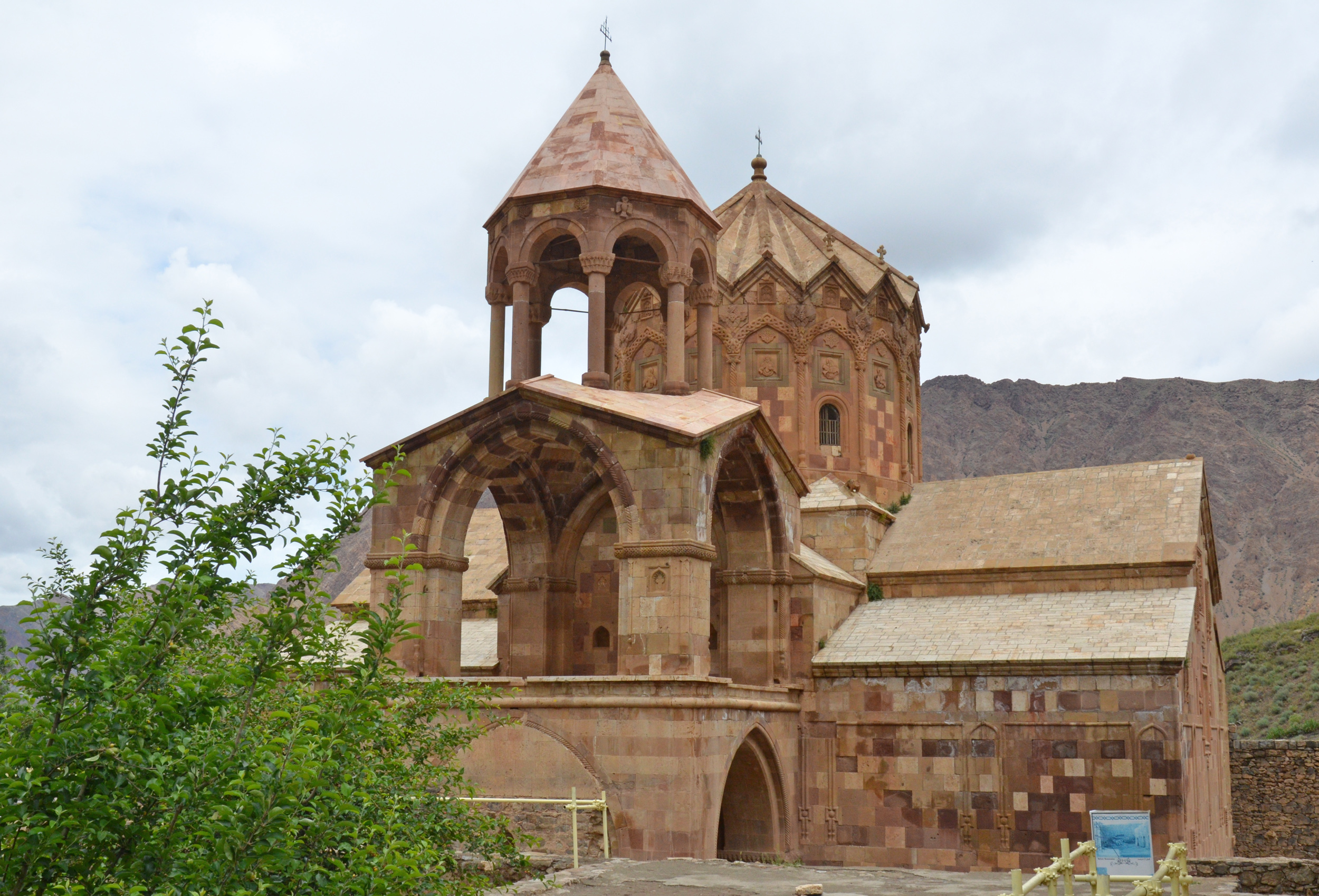

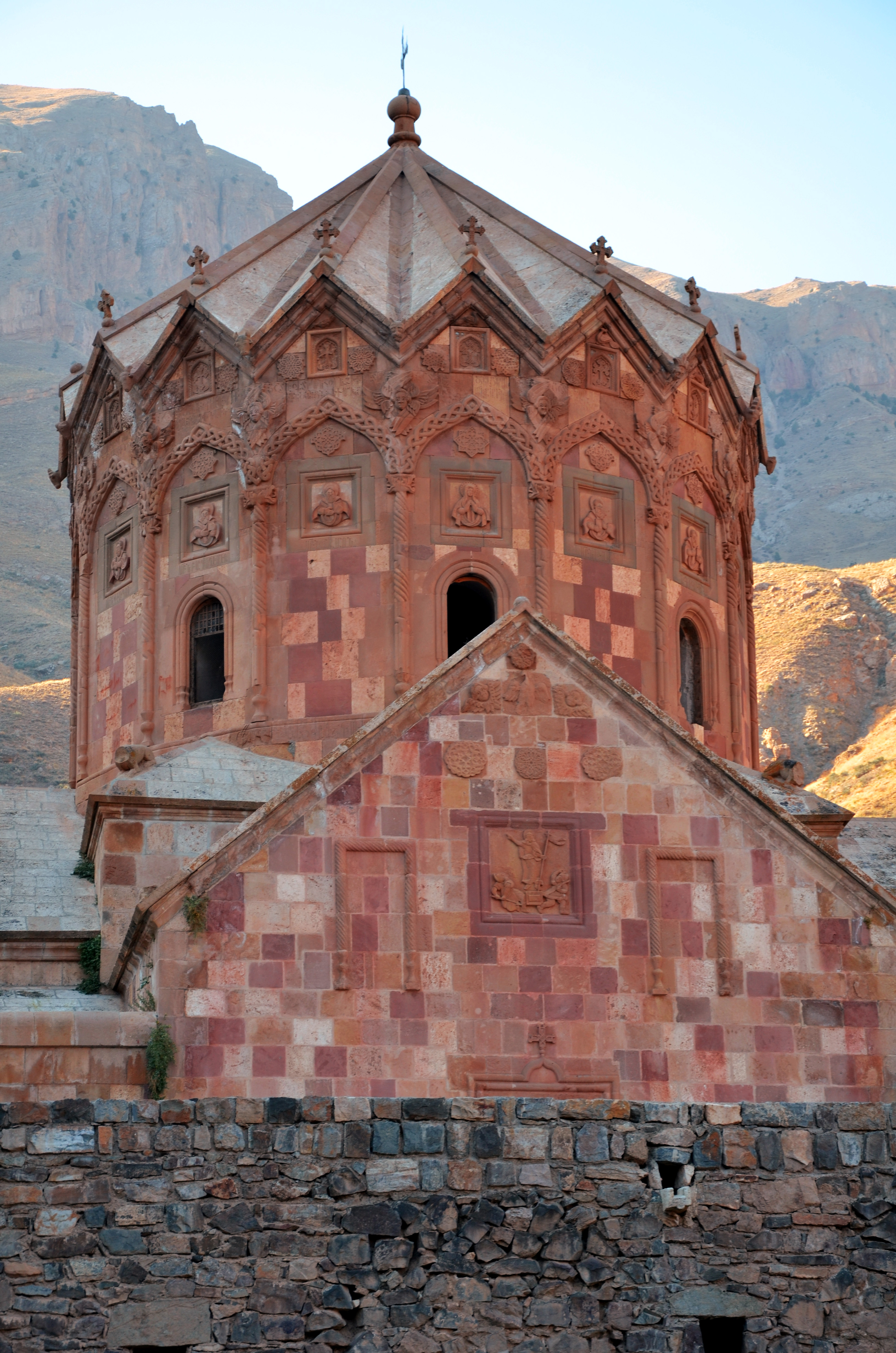

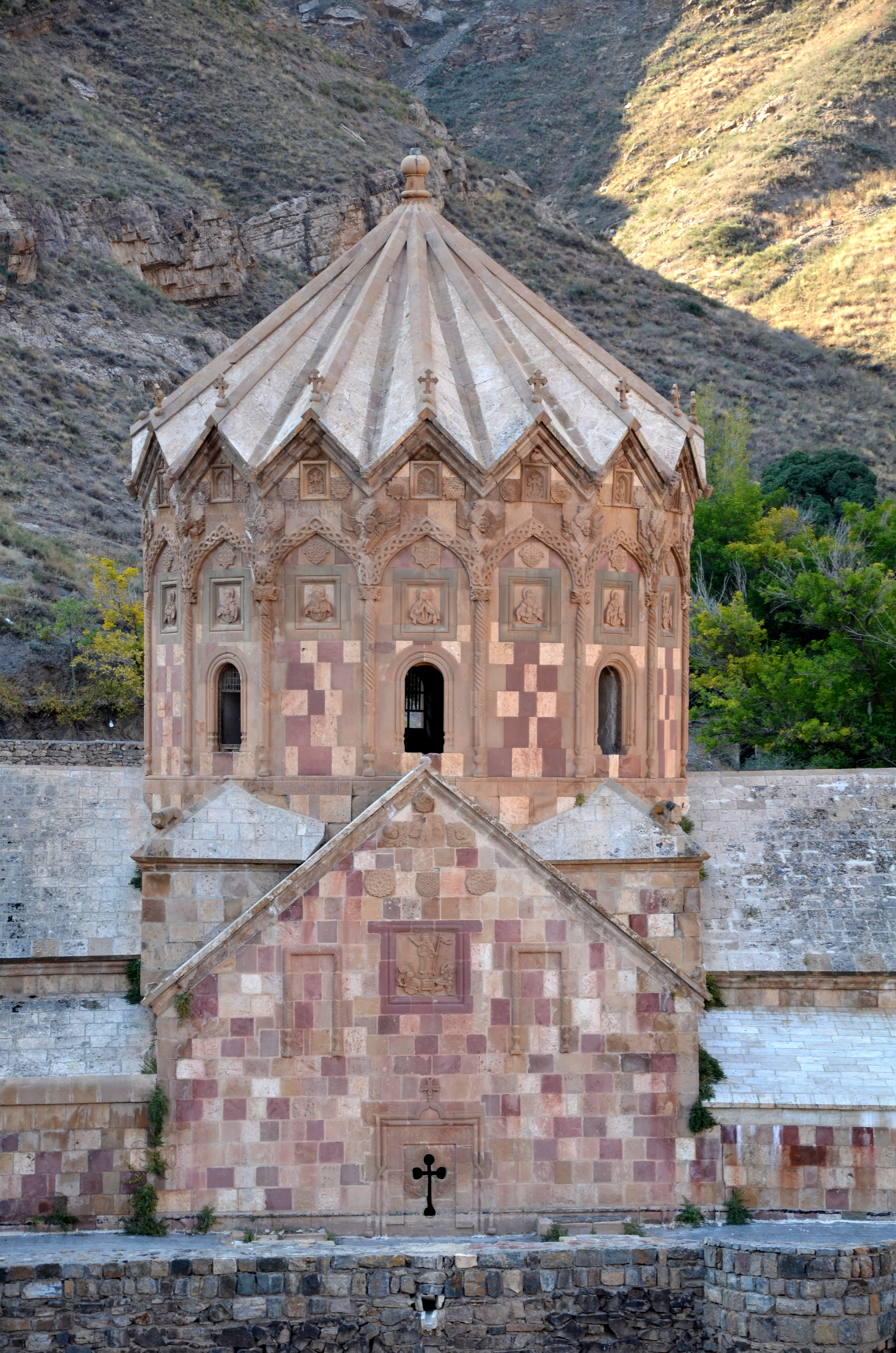

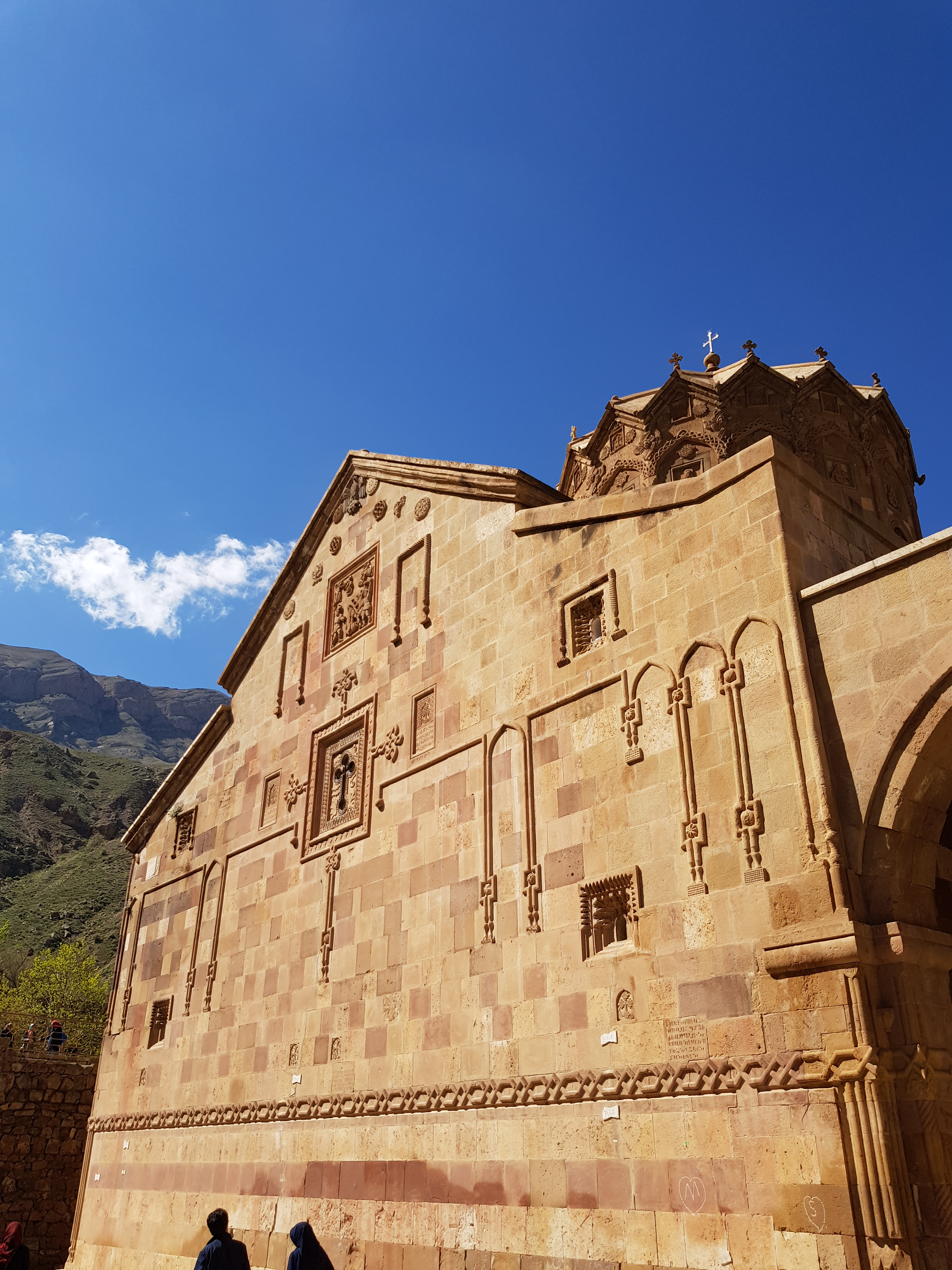

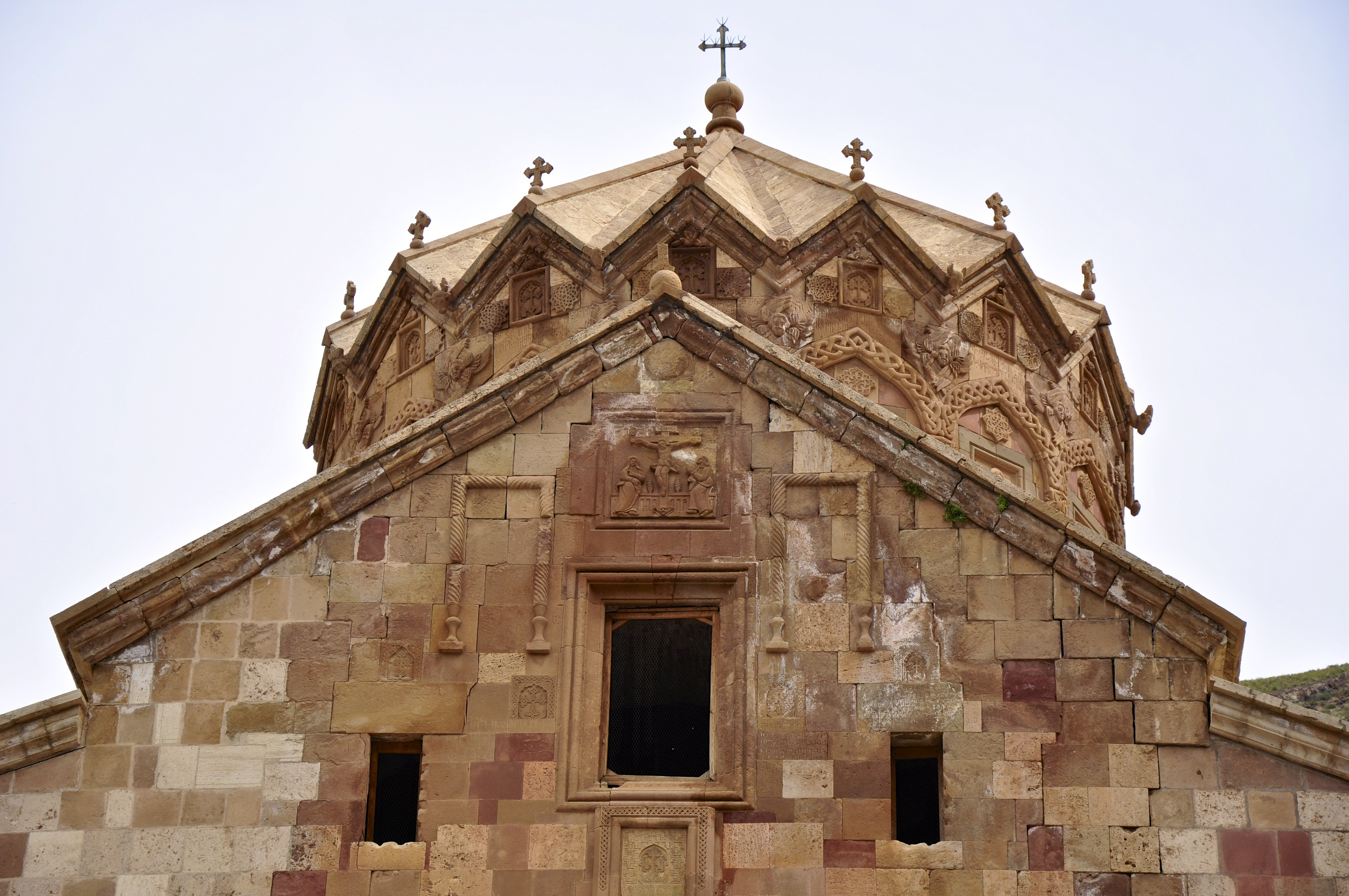

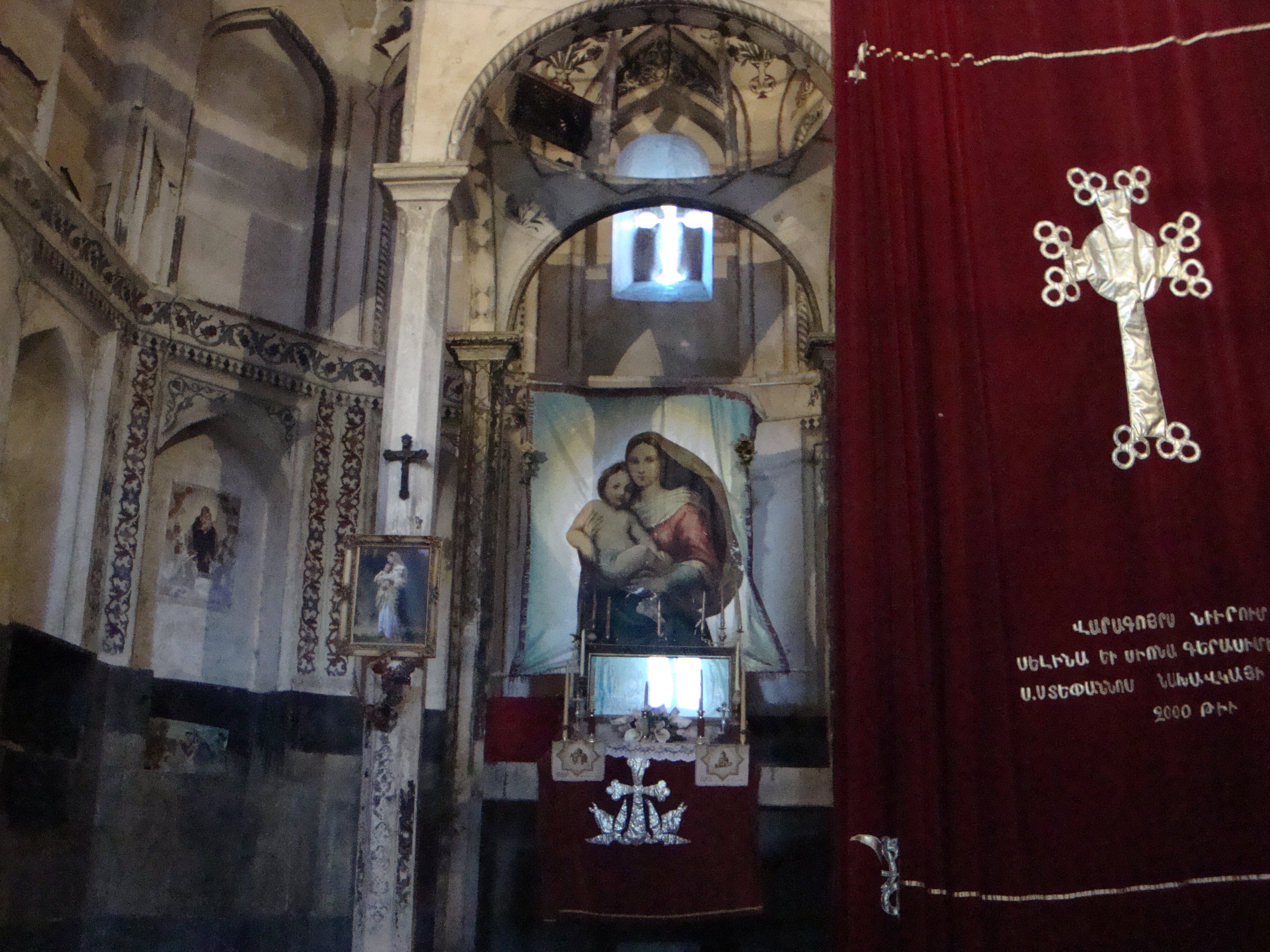
Interior of the Saint Stepanos Monastery

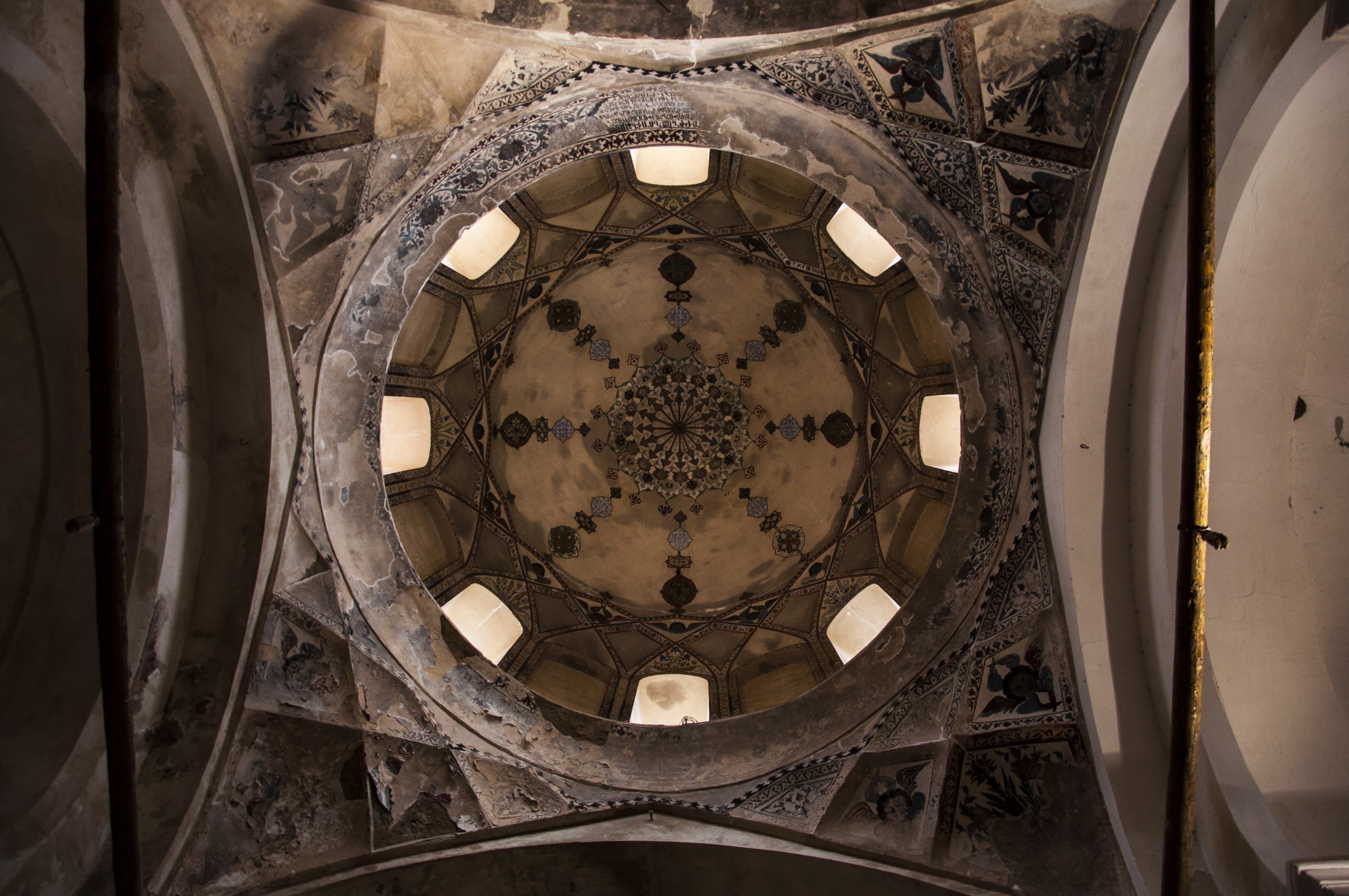

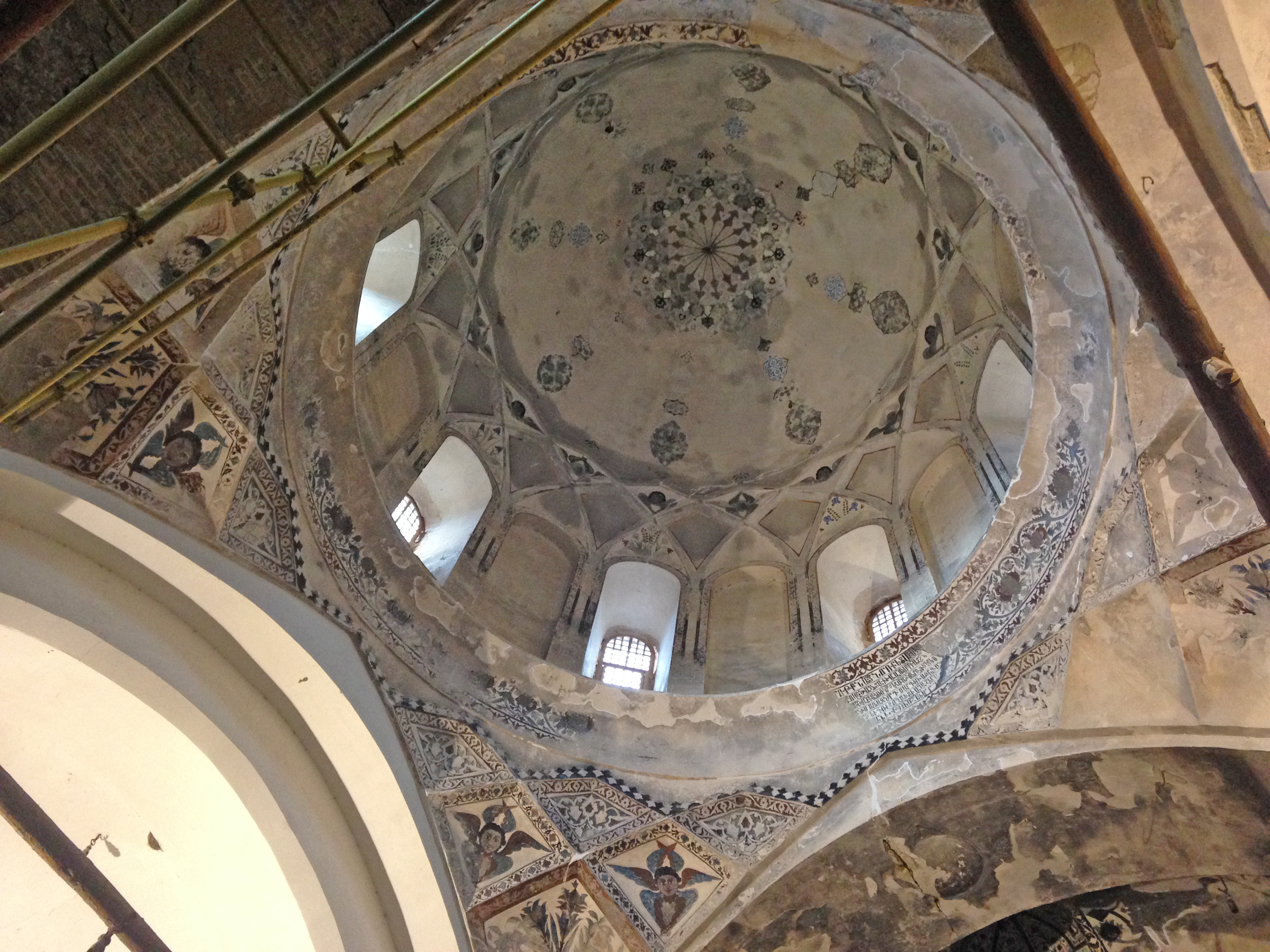
Interior of the dome of the Saint Stepanos Monastery.

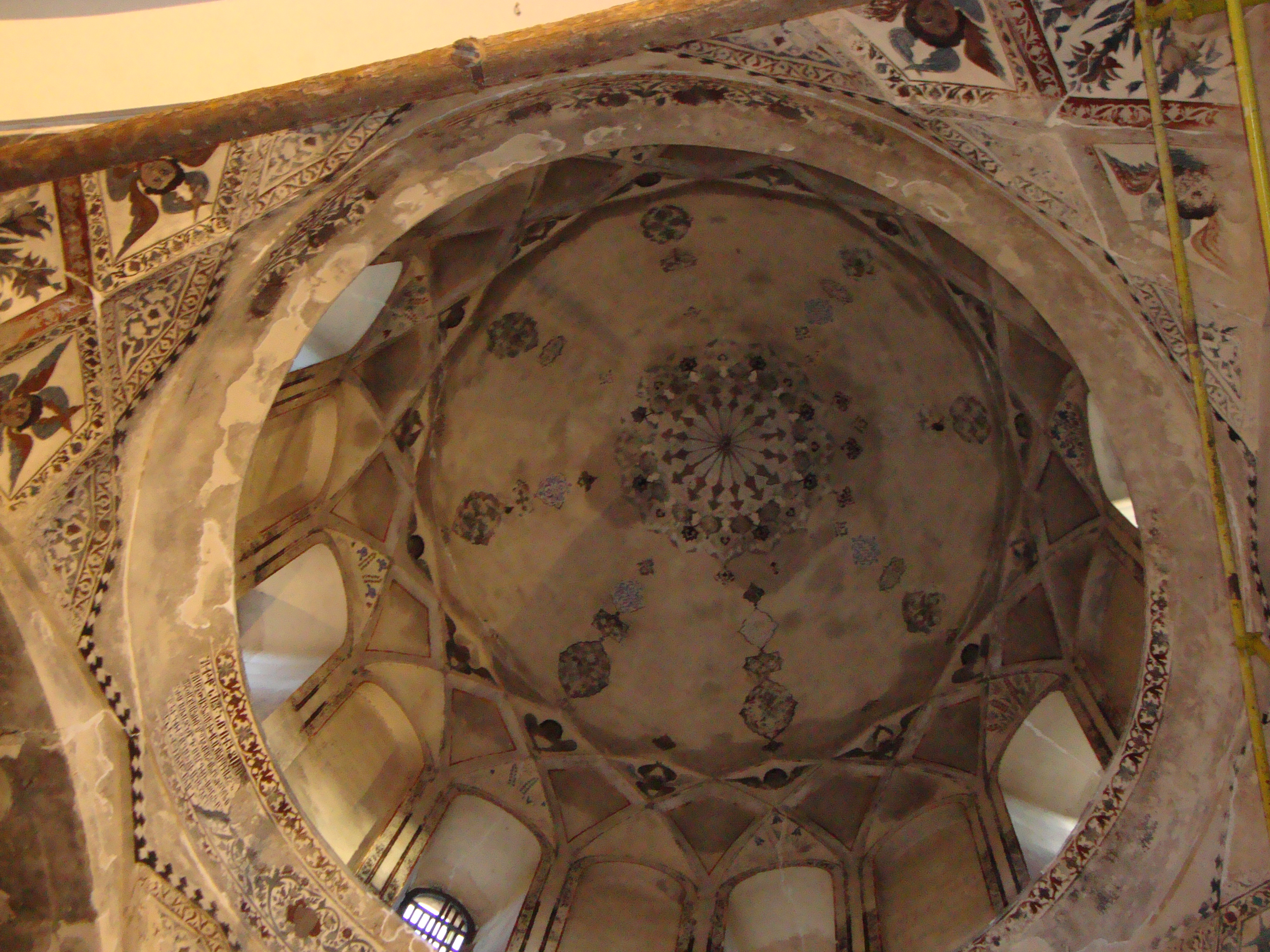

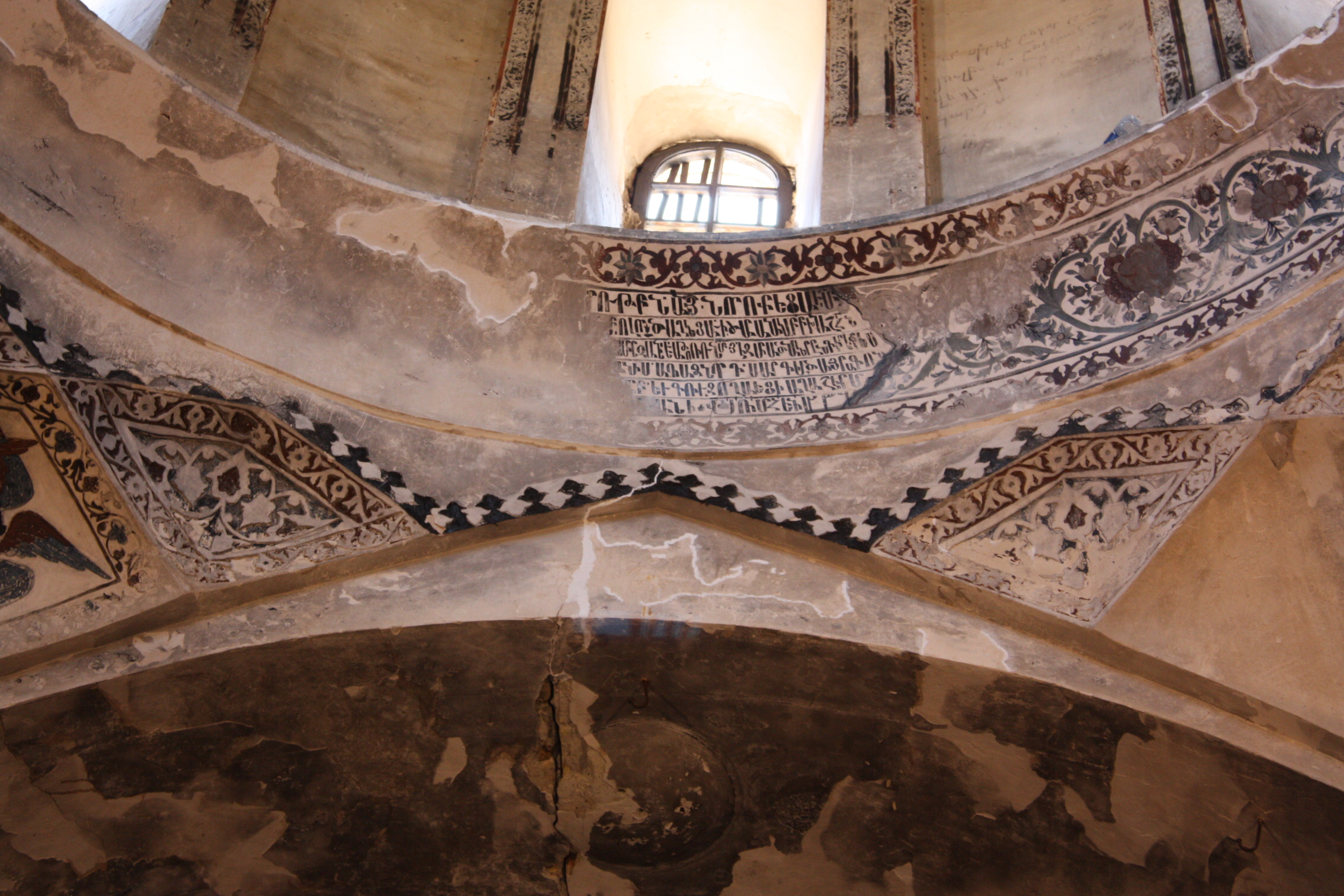

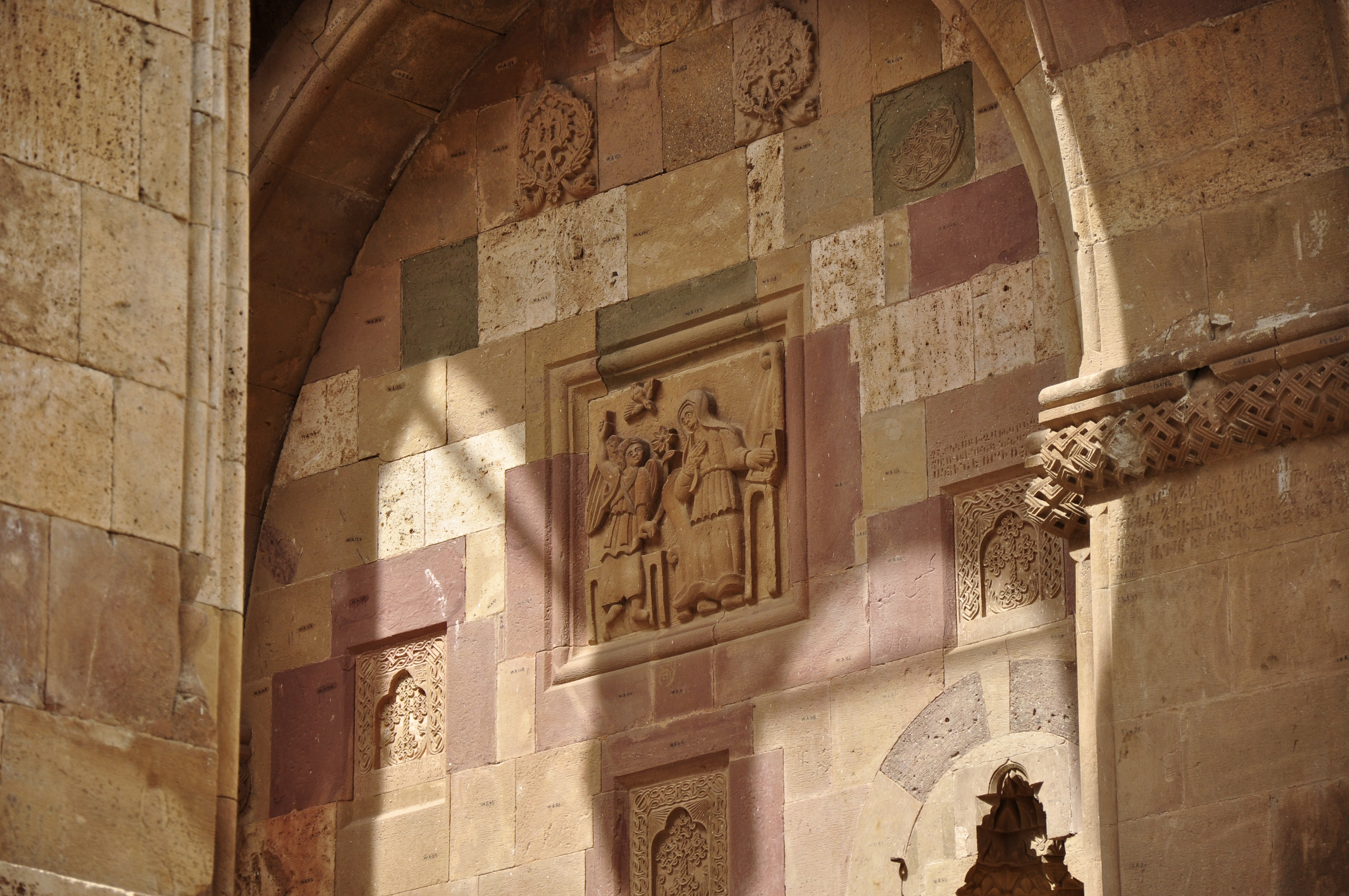
Reliefs on a wall inside the Saint Stepanos - Monastery.

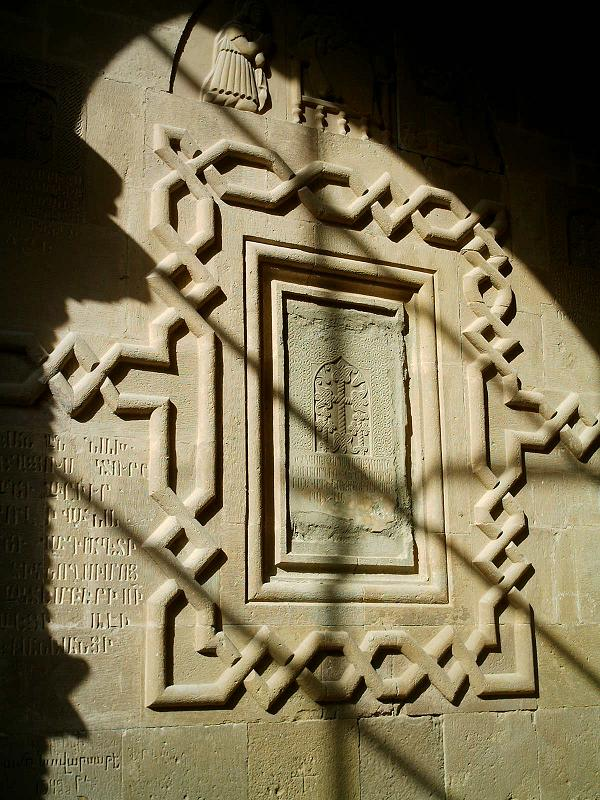

== See also ==
- Saint Thaddeus Monastery
- Chapel of Dzordzor
- Chapel of Chupan
