= Armenian Monastic Ensembles of Iran =

Armenian churches

UNESCO World Heritage Site
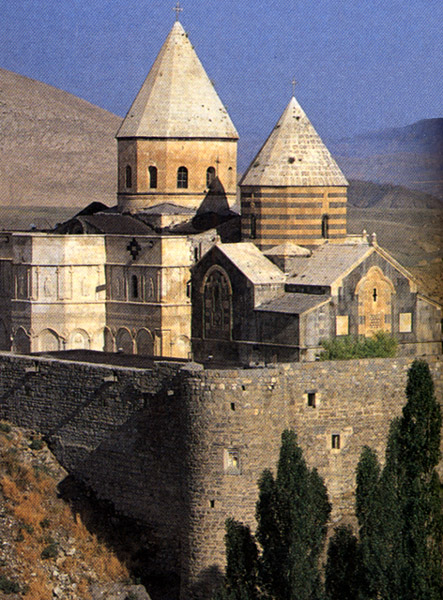
- St. Thaddeus Monastery
- Interactive map of Armenian Monastic Ensembles of Iran
- Location: Iran
- Includes: Monastery of Saint Thaddeus; Monastery of Saint Stepanos; Chapel of Chupan; Darresham church; Chapel of Dzordzor
- Criteria: Cultural: ii, iii, vi
- Reference: 1262
- Inscription: 2008 (32nd Session)
- Area: 129.2819 ha (319.463 acres)
- Buffer zone: 655.0122 ha (1,618.570 acres)
- Locations of three primary ensembles within Iranian Azerbaijan

The Armenian Monastic Ensembles of Iran is a UNESCO World Heritage Site located in the West Azerbaijan and East Azerbaijan provinces in Iran. The site comprises three groups of Armenian churches that were established between the 7th and 16th centuries A.D.

The edifices—the St. Thaddeus Monastery, the Saint Stepanos Monastery, and the Chapel of Dzordzor—have undergone many renovations. These sites were inscribed on the World Heritage List in the 32nd session of the World Heritage Committee on 8 July 2008. The three ensembles lie in a total area of 129 hectares (320 acres) and were inscribed under UNESCO criteria (ii), (iii), and (vi) for their outstanding value in showcasing Armenian architectural and decorative traditions, for being a major centre for diffusion of Armenian culture in the region, and for being places of pilgrimage of the Apostle Thaddeus and Saint Stepanos, key figures in Armenian religious traditions. They represent the last vestiges of old Armenian culture in its southeastern periphery. The ensembles are in a good state of preservation.

== Location ==
The Armenian Monastic Ensembles of Iran are located in the West Azerbaijan and East Azerbaijan provinces in Iran. The three churches lie in a total area of 129 hectares (320 acres). The St. Thaddeus Monastery also known as "Kara Kelisa" or "Black Church" in West Azerbaijan province is about 18 kilometres (11 mi) from Maku. The Saint Stepanos Monastery is 17 kilometres (11 mi) to the west of Jolfa city, East Azarbaijan Province in northwest Iran.

== History ==
The Armenian people are native to the Armenian highlands, which stretch into Iranian Azerbaijan. Armenia converted to Christianity in the early 4th century A.D. A portion of the region forms part of historical Armenia. Some of the oldest Armenian chapels, monasteries and churches in the world are located within this region of Iran, and the Iranian Azerbaijan region in general is home to the oldest churches in Iran.

According to unverified reports it is believed that the Apostle Thaddeus was buried at the site of the St. Thaddeus Monastery in the 1st century A.D., and that Gregory the Illuminator was responsible for establishing a monastery here in the 4th century. However, there is recorded proof that St. Thaddeus Monastery dates to the 7th century. It was the second Armenian church to be built, following the Etchmiadzin Cathedral and was the seat of the diocese in the 10th century. It was destroyed in an earthquake in 1319 and was rebuilt due to the efforts of Bishop Zachariah in the 1320s.

During the reign of the Safavid dynasty in the 15th century, the monasteries were preserved. The monasteries were then deserted during the 16th and 17th centuries following a period of attacks by the Ottomans that prompted many Armenians to emigrate to central Iran. Once the Safavids reestablished themselves in the area, the monasteries were reoccupied and renovated. However, during the 18th century the area became a cauldron of conflicts for domination among the Russian, Ottoman, and Persian empires. When the Persians finally gained control, the monasteries were damaged. During the Qajar era, Armenians regained control over the monasteries and they were rebuilt. The existing St. Thaddeus Monastery was rebuilt in 1814 and refurbished in the 1970s.

Similarly, it is recorded that Saint Stepanos Monastery was first established in 649 A.D. and a new building constructed at the same location in the 10th century. It was a major Christian church during the history of Armenian independence and development. After it suffered damages due to earthquake, it was rebuilt by Bishop Zachariah in the 1320s. During the entire 14th century, it was the centre of influence in the region for Christian missionary work. This period marked the creation of literary manuscripts and paintings on religious themes. The monastery was rebuilt during the period from 1819 to 1825 and again became a center of religious activity. It was refurbished in the 1970s, and again during the period from 1983 to 2001.

The Dzordzor Chapel was built on the bank of the Makuchay River at Dzordzor by Bishop Zachariah in 1314 on very modest lines, making use of the vestiges of an earlier religious monument dated between the 10th and 12th centuries. During the period of Ottoman rule, some parts of the building were destroyed. Later, the chapel came under threat of submergence from a proposed dam and had to be shifted to a new location upstream.

=== World heritage status ===
The three monasteries of the ensemble were inscribed on 2008 under UNESCO criteria (ii), (iii), and (vi) for their outstanding value in showcasing Armenian architectural and decorative traditions, for being a major centre for diffusion of Armenian culture in the region, and for being a place of pilgrimage of the apostle St. Thaddeus, a key figure in Armenian religious traditions. They represent the last vestiges of old Armenian culture in its southeastern periphery. The ensemble is in a good state of preservation.

== Architecture ==
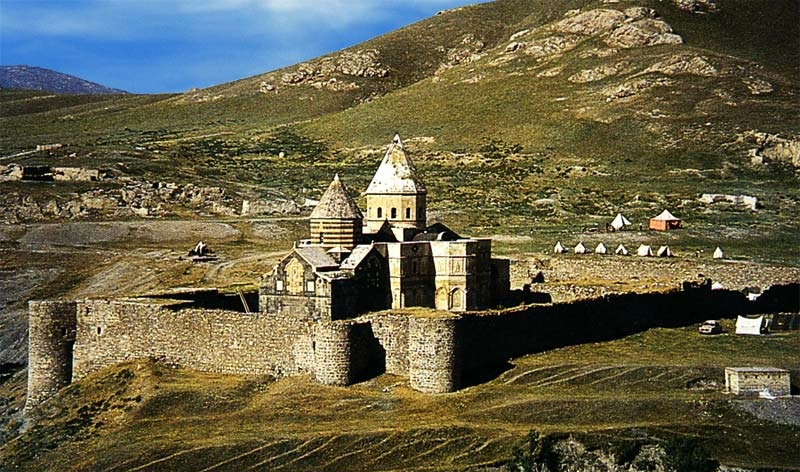
St. Thaddeus Monastery

The three monuments represent a blend of architectural styles from the Byzantine, Persian, Eastern Orthodox, Assyrian, Persian, Muslim, and Armenian cultures.

=== Saint Thaddeus Monastery ===
The Saint Thaddeus Monastery ensemble is in two zones, the first of which covers an area of 29.85 hectares (73.8 acres) and comprises four chapels and the monastery itself. A compound wall of 64 by 51 metres (210 ft × 167 ft) with towers at the corners encircles the main monastery complex. Adjoining this wall, residential quarters have been built for the monks. In the interior courtyard, the main religious structures are located in a space of 41.7 by 23.6 metres (137 ft × 77 ft). There is a large entrance that is built on four pillars. The main church—the so-called White Church—is built on a Greek cross plan. It has an umbrella-shaped dome and a bell tower. There is also a Black Church, the oldest part of the ensemble, which is also crowned by a dome. The exterior artwork consists of cut-stone fascia of different colours, an Armenian architectural art form. The ornamentation in the interior is a blend of Armenian and Persian themes. There are also three more chapels to the northeast of the main monastery.

The second zone is about 2 kilometres (1.2 mi) away to the southeast of the monastery, occupies an area of 1.98 hectares (4.9 acres), and is the location of a fifth chapel, the Chapel of Sandokt. In one of the two cemeteries next to this chapel there is a sarcophagus.

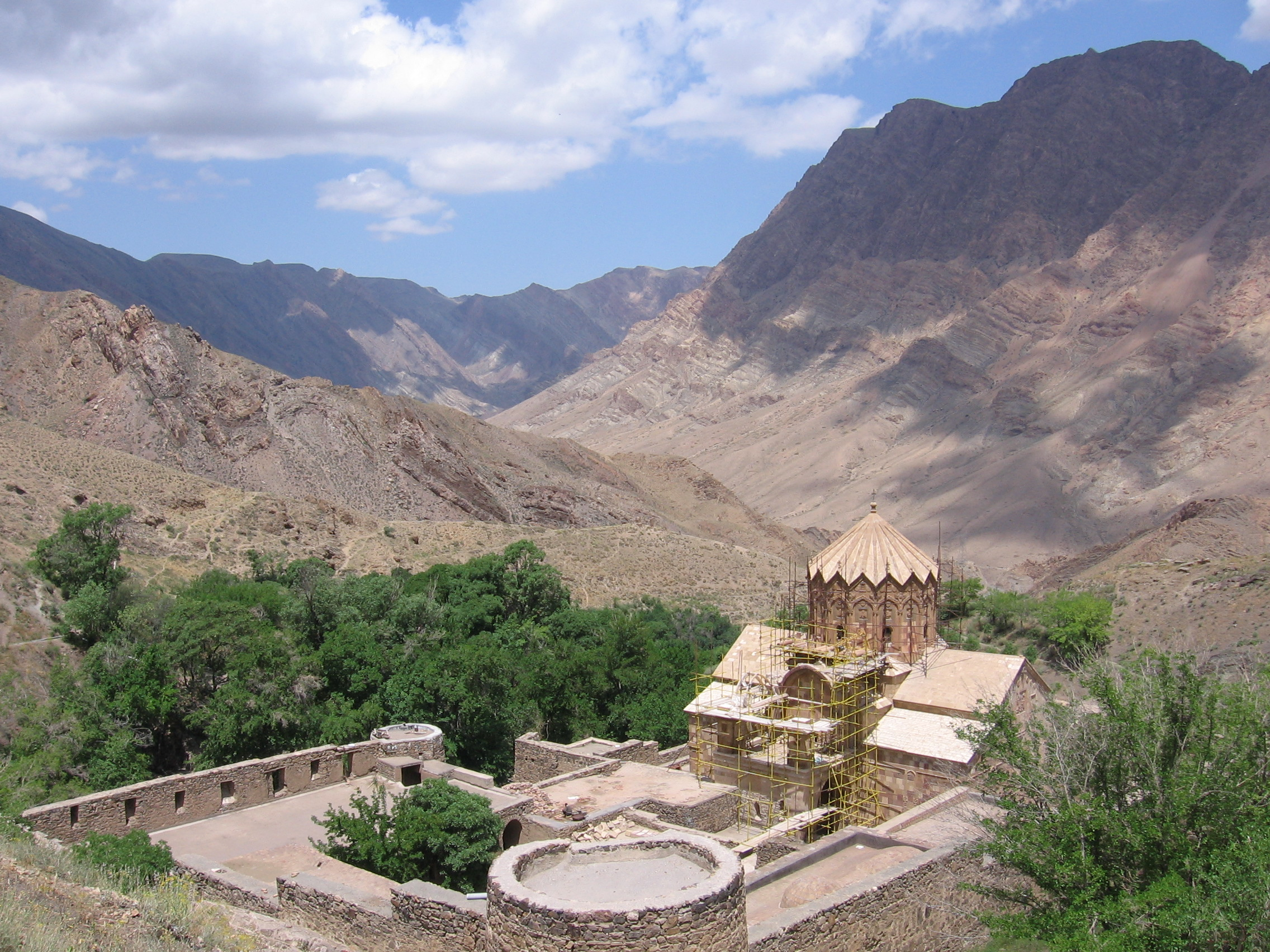
Saint Stepanos Monastery

=== Saint Stepanos Monastery ===
The Saint Stepanos Monastery ensemble is in the gorge of the Araxe River, which borders Azerbaijan. The ensemble includes the main monastery church, the Darreh Sham chapel, and the Chupan chapel. The central zone of the monastery is in an area of 72.06 hectares (178.1 acres). The main chapel is located on a steep slope within an enclosed wall in an area of 48 by 72 metres (157 ft × 236 ft). There are also residences built for the monks next to the monastery. The length of the church, built in a Greek cross form, is 27 metres (89 ft) and its height is 25 metres (82 ft). A four-pillared entrance is topped by a bell tower built in two levels; the first level is rectangular in shape, and at the second level there are pillars supporting an umbrella-shaped dome. Built in the style of Armenian religious architecture, it has cut-stone fascia. Within the church there are paintings that are based on similar ones at the Etchmiadzin Cathedral, which is a blend of Christian and Islamic art forms.

Downstream of the monastery is an area of 10.85 hectares (26.8 acres) where the village of Darresham, the cemetery, and an associated church are located. The village is destroyed except for the church, which is built in the form of a basilica, with four pillars supporting a cupola. The cemetery in the village has tombs dated to 16th century.

Upstream, about 10 kilometres (6.2 mi) away, is the Chupan chapel (Chupan meaning "shepherd"), located close to the town of Jolfa on the bank of the Araxe River in an area of 4.18 hectares (10.3 acres). It is well preserved and is built to a rectangular plan of 5.5 by 6.5 metres (18 ft × 21 ft). It has a dome that is supported over a tambour, but the rest of the structures next to the chapel are in ruins.

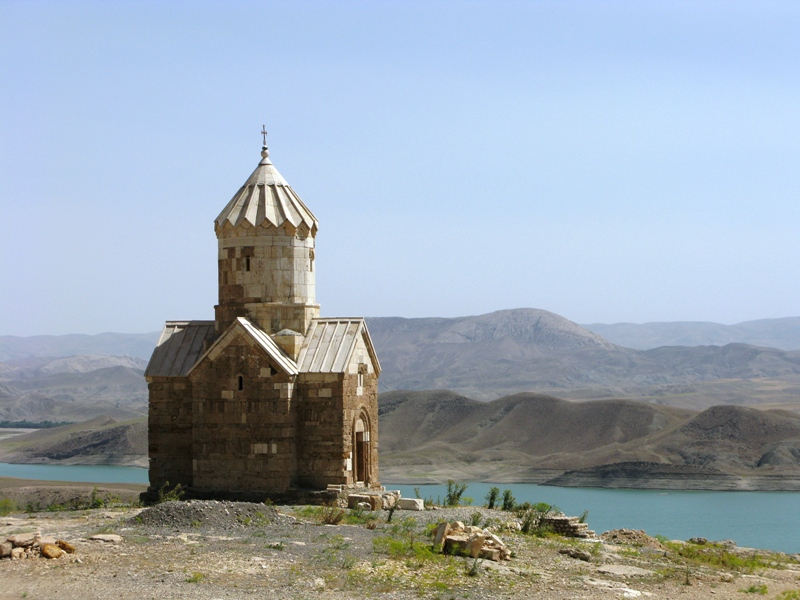
Chapel of Dzordzor

=== Chapel of Dzordzor ===
The old Chapel of Dzordzor lies in the Makuchay River valley, occupying an area of 0.79 hectares (2.0 acres). What is present now is a remnant of the large monastery that once existed there, as the entire chapel has been shifted to a new location 600 metres (2,000 ft) away due to submergence resulting from a dam that was built on the river. Before the building was dismantled, detailed plans were made and the dismantled elements numbered so that they could be reassembled to the same design at the new site. Of 1500 stones used at the new site to rebuild the chapel with the dome, only 250 were new stones as all the numbered stones from the old site were able to be reassembled according plan. This reconstruction was carried out during the period 1987–88.

== Bibliography ==
- Amurian, A.; Kasheff, M. (1986). "ARMENIANS OF MODERN IRAN". Encyclopædia Iranica.
- Bloom, Jonathan; Blair, Sheila S., eds. (2009). The Grove Encyclopedia of Islamic Art and Architecture. Oxford: Oxford University Press. ISBN 978-0195309911.
- Bournoutian, George (2002). A Concise History of the Armenian People: (from Ancient Times to the Present) (2 ed.). Mazda Publishers. ISBN 978-1568591414.
- Burke, Andrew; Elliott, Mark (2008). Iran. Ediz. Inglese. Lonely Planet. ISBN 978-1-74220-349-2.
- Iran Chamber Society (n.d.). "Iranian Architecture & Monuments: Historical Churches in Iran". Encyclopædia Iranica Foundation.
- Encyclopædia Iranica (1986). "Armenia and Iran ii. The Pre-Islamic Period". Encyclopædia Iranica Foundation.
- Etheredge, Laura (January 2011). Iran. The Rosen Publishing Group. ISBN 978-1-61530-308-3.
- Iranian Students News Agency staff (7 May 2013). "World's most ancient Armenian Church in Iran". Iranian Students News Agency. Archived from the original on 12 January 2020 – via Payvand.
- Tucker, Jonathan (2015). The Silk Road - Central Asia: A Travel Companion. I.B.Tauris. ISBN 978-1-78076-925-7.
- UNESCO staff (n.d.). "Armenian Monastic Ensembles of Iran". UNESCO Organization.
- UNESCO World Heritage Centre (2008). "Advisory Body Evaluation: Armenian Monastic Ensembles of Iran" (PDF). UNESCO Organization.
