= Zangmar River =

River in north western Iran

Zangibar
- Location of mouth

Location
- Country: Iran

Physical characteristics
- Mouth: Aras
  - coordinates: 39°21′08″N 45°05′07″E

Basin features
- Progression: Aras→ Kura→ Caspian Sea

Zangmar River (Persian: رود زنگمار), also known as the Ṭłmut River, is a river in Maku County, West Azarbaijan Province, Iran. It originates in the Zagros Mountains above Maku, Iran along the Iran–Turkey border, not far from Mount Ararat and flows south and east into the Araxes at the town of Pol Dasht.

A major tributary of the Zangibar is the Barun River which is dammed at 39°11′17″N 44°28′55″E some 12 miles (19 km) above Maku, forming the Maku-Barun reservoir. The dam is rammed earth and riprap with a clay lining 78 metres (256 ft) high, impounding some 135,000,000 cubic metres (109,000 acre⋅ft) of water.

Beyond Maku, the Zangibar flows past the villages of Tappeh Bashi-ye Namaz, and Moradluy-e Olya before entering the Araxes as a right tributary.
