= Church of the Mother of God =

Church of the Mother of God, Holy Mother of God Church, Church of the Theotokos, or similar, may refer to:

== Armenia ==
- Holy Mother of God Church, Vagharshapat
- Holy Mother of God Church, Voskepar
- Holy Mother of God Church, Yeghvard
- Surp Astvatsatsin Church of Karbi
- Zoravor Surp Astvatsatsin Church, Yerevan

== Bulgaria ==
- Church of the Holy Mother of God, Boboshevo
- Church of the Holy Mother of God, Panagyurishte
- Church of the Holy Mother of God, Plovdiv

== Georgia ==
- Areni Church
- Holy Mother of God Church of Bethlehem, Tbilisi

== Iran ==
- Church of the Holy Mother of God, Darashamb
- Holy Mother of God Church, Tehran

== Serbia ==
- Church of the Holy Mother of God, Kuršumlija
- Church of the Holy Mother of God, Selačka

== Syria ==
- Church of the Holy Mother of God, Aleppo

== Turkey ==
- Church of the Theotokos at Lips (Constantinople), now the Fenari Isa Mosque, Istanbul

== See also ==
- St. Mary's Church (disambiguation)
- Dormition of the Theotokos Church (disambiguation)
- Church of the Nativity of the Theotokos (disambiguation)
- Holy Mother of God Cathedral (disambiguation)
- Monastery of Holy Mother of God (disambiguation)
