= Monastery of Holy Mother of God =

Monastery of Holy Mother of God may refer to:

- Monastery of Holy Mother of God, Kuršumlija, a defunct Serbian Orthodox monastery located in Kuršumlija
- Monastery of the Holy Mother of God, Ston, a Serbian Orthodox monastery located in Ston

== See also ==
- Holy Mother of God Cathedral (disambiguation)
- Holy Mother of God Church (disambiguation)
