= Monument to the Unknown Hero =

Balkan Wars and World War I monument in Serbia

- Serbia
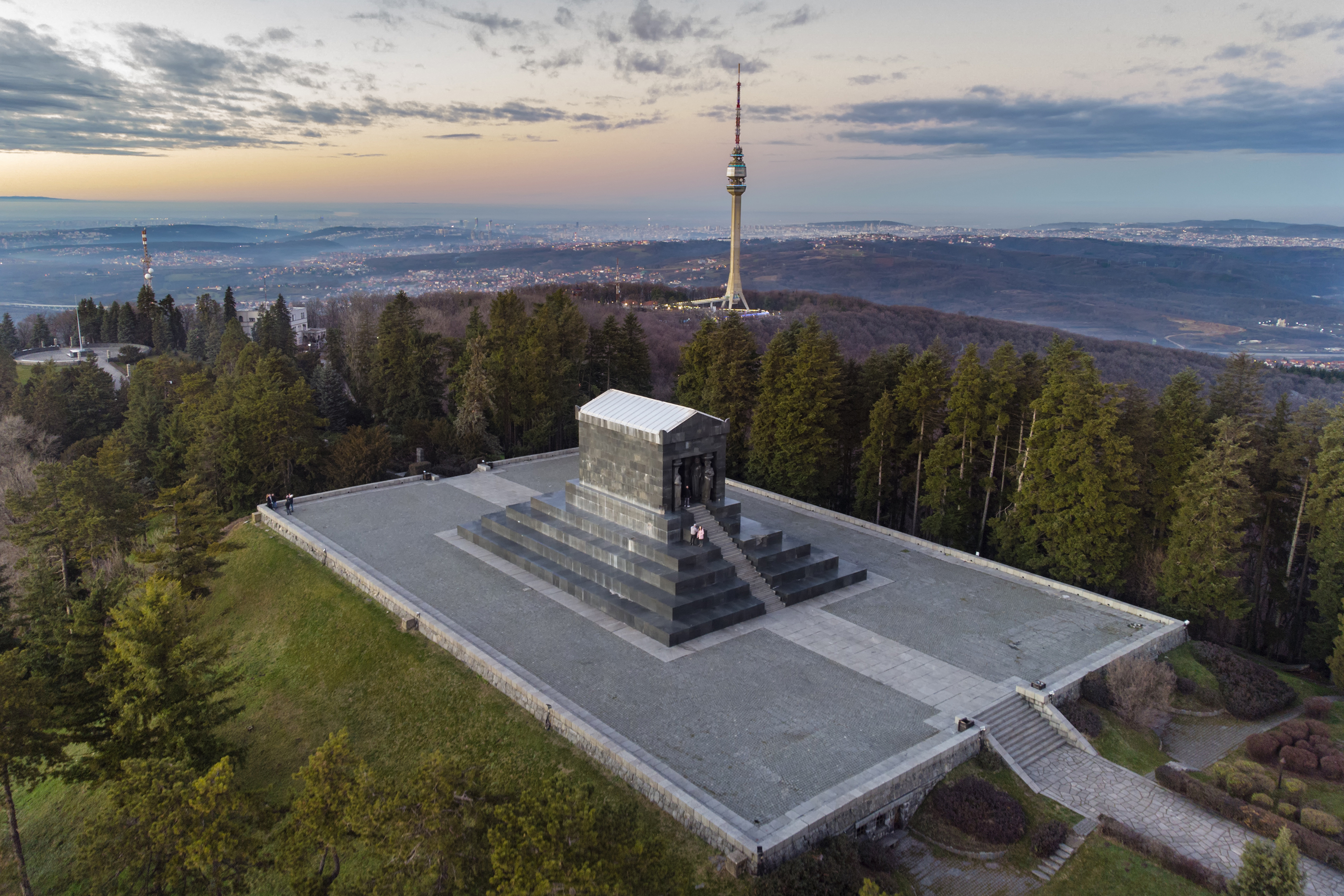
- Monument to the Unknown Hero
- For Balkan Wars and World War I heroes
- Unveiled: 28 June 1938
- Location: 44°41′19.3″N 20°30′56.9″E; Avala near Belgrade, Serbia
- Designed by: Ivan Meštrović
- Unknowns: 1
- Alexander I King of Yugoslavia to the Unknown Hero

Cultural Heritage of Serbia
- Type: Cultural Monument of Exceptional Importance
- Designated: 1984
- Reference no.: СК 644

The Monument to the Unknown Hero (Serbian: Споменик Незнаном јунаку, romanized: Spomenik Neznanom junaku) is a Balkan Wars and World War I memorial located atop Mount Avala, south-east of Belgrade, Serbia, and designed by the sculptor Ivan Meštrović. The memorial was built in 1934–1938 on the place where an unknown Serbian World War I soldier was buried. It is similar to many other tombs of the unknown soldier built by the allies after the war. The Žrnov fortress was previously located on the same place.

== Origin ==
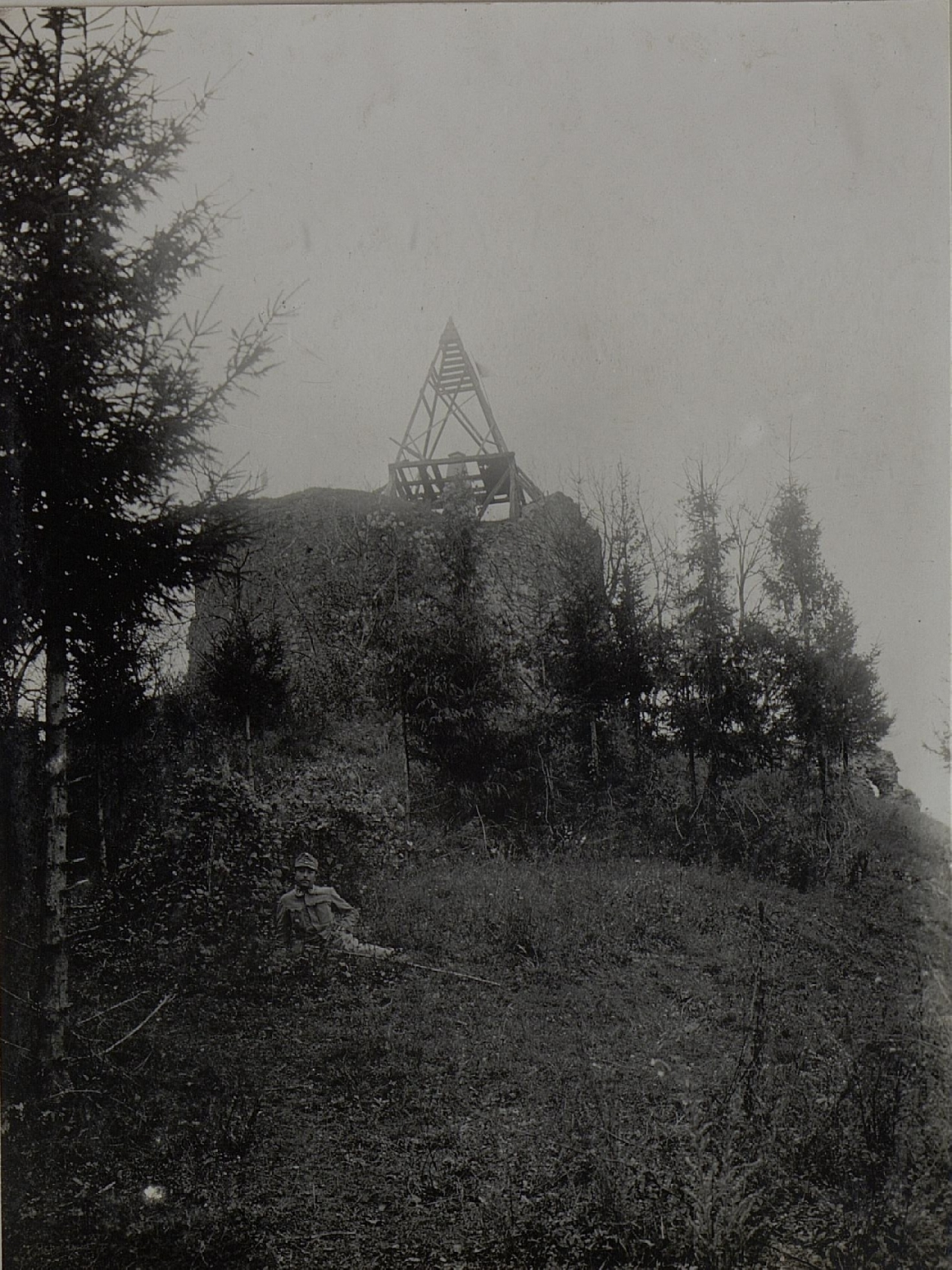
Avala in October 1915, when the unknown soldier was killed

On the night of 13/14 October 1915, Combined squad of the Belgrade's Defense, held the line Avala-Zuce, defending it from the joint Austro-Hungarian and German offensive. Austro-Hungarian 9th Hill brigade of the 59th Division took the front rim of Avala on 16 October, with an assignment to push Serbian forces from the mountain. Austro-Hungarians were reinforced with one German half-battalion. However, one Serbian battalion successfully defended the top of Avala against the Austro-Hungarian battalions of the 49th and 84th regiments, aided by the 204th German reserve infantry regiment. On the same day, the command of the Belgrade's Defense ordered the retreat to the new positions so on 17 October occupational forces reached the southern section of Avala, conquering the entire mountain. Their soldiers then buried Serbian combatants who were killed in action. In the valley, below Žrnov, on the grave of one of them, they placed a wooden cross with the inscription in German: "One unknown Serbian soldier".

== Predecessor ==
In the late 1920, a popular news topic in Serbia was the burial of the French "unknown soldier" in Panthéon. As the French influence was very strong on Serbian army since the mid-19th century, the idea of doing the same spread among the veterans and social associations, reaching the National Assembly. Existing commemorative cross from 1915 was known only locally and to the Avala visitors. In the first half of 1921 the initiative to build a more dignified commemorative mark gained momentum. On 24 June 1921, president of the Constitutional Assembly, Ivan Ribar, summoned state dignitaries to the meeting with the agenda of constructing the monument. Present at the meeting, among others, were the general and the former defense minister Mihailo Rašić, Rector of the University of Belgrade Bogdan Gavrilović, mayor of Belgrade Dobra Mitrović and manager of the National Theatre in Belgrade Milan Grol. It was decided that the future monument will be "dignified...but humble".

First step was to determine whether it was indeed a Serbian soldier in the grave under the wooden cross. An exhumation was conducted by the commission on 23 November 1921. Parts of the grenade are found under the skull, almost as a pillow, while the skeleton had the blown left side of the chest, so it is estimated that he was killed by the Austro-Hungarian howitzer while he was watching from the lookout. He was apparently buried in the crater formed by the explosion of the very grenade that killed him. Other objects found in the grave include: parts of the military blouse, Serbian bandolier (belt with fišeklijas, the powder pockets, full of ammunition), knapsack, military boots with telephone wires instead of the shoe laces, a wallet with three coins: two 1904 Serbian coins of 2 dinars, with the profile of King Peter I of Serbia, and one coin of 1 groschen (that is, 20 paras from 1912) and a piece of paper, barely recognizable, which is suspected to be a 10 dinars banknote from 1908. The soldier had no identity badge which suggests that he was either member of the Third Call regiments (with soldiers over 38 years old) or was drafted immediately prior to the battle which is probably correct as the skeletal remains indicated a very young male, not older than 19–20 years. Some sources actually claim he was only 15. It was said that his skull was "small, like that of a boy" and that the skeleton was petite, of a boyish, thin stature. The ammunition was Russian (Tula Arms Plant, 1906), 7.62 mm × 57 mm (0.300 in × 2.244 in), which means that he used a Mosin–Nagant M1891 rifle. The boots were American, M-1910, mostly distributed to the members of the Personnel department and, to a lesser extent, to the regiments of the First Call (which drafted the youngest soldiers, up to 31 years old). The commission concluded that the remains do belong to a Serbian soldier and reburied him, with the grenade parts, while his personal belongings were taken to the cabinet of the president of the assembly for safekeeping.

The Assembly Board organized many events in 1922 in order to gather the funding for the monument, but also used the other means for the promotional purposes, like the cinema shows. Also, some more prominent events are used, like the Christmas money collecting by the Patriarch Dimitrije or the wedding of King Alexander I and Queen Maria on 8 June 1922. Not having much faith in the politicians and expecting that they would drag the process, local administration organized the construction in 1922. As the railway was being built in the area (Topčider-Mala Krsna), the Yugoslav Railways donated all the needed materials. When the Board found out that the locals are building their own monument, conceptually completely different from their idea, Ivan Ribar held talks with the local administration and an agreement was reached that this monument will be a "temporary solution". The monument was built near the place where an earlier monument to the unknown soldier was built. It was projected by Milan Minić and the construction began on 1 April 1922. The monument was built by the local villagers, aided by the engineers and workers from the Rakovica railway section. The monument was finished on 14 May 1922 and publicly dedicated on 1 June 1922. The base was a two-leveled square pedestal with a regular, four-sided pyramid made of the roughly dressed stone. The base of the pyramid was 3 m × 3 m (9.8 ft × 9.8 ft) and it was 5 m (16 ft) tall. Four jardinières were leaned on each side of the pyramid, with the seedlings of the common box. They were hexagonally shaped and also made of the roughly dressed stone. On top of the pyramid a six-armed cross was placed. On the eastern side of the pedestal a plate was placed with the inscription: "To the fallen heroes in the wars for liberation and unification 1912–1918, this monument is erected by the thankful people of the Vračar District. Consecrated on 1 June 1922". On the other three side the inscriptions simply said "cross (made) of Carrara marble". On the western side of the horizontal arm of the cross another inscription read: "Unknown Serbian soldier confirmed by the commission on 29 November 1921". The monument was encircled by 16 short stone pillars, 4 on each side, connected with chains. Remains of the unknown soldier were placed in the metal coffin and walled in the monument, together with the small wooden case in the colors of the Serbian flag containing the grenade parts, and remains of another three unidentified soldiers which were discovered in the foothills of Avala. Among the dignitaries at the dedication of the monument were Ivan Ribar, other senior politicians from the Assembly, presidents of the surrounding municipalities and districts and several government ministers. King Alexander visited the location later that same day.

On 28 June 1938, when the new monument was finished, the remains of the unknown soldier were taken from the old coffin, washed in white wine, wrapped in white linen and placed in the new metal coffin which was moved to the crypt inside the new monument. Remains of the other three soldiers were placed in the memorial ossuary in Belgrade Fortress. Personal belongings of the soldier were handed over to the Military Museum, also on the Fortress, but they disappeared later. The old monument was completely demolished, except for the six-armed cross which was moved to the churchyard of the Church of Saint Mary Magdalene in Beli Potok, where it is still located.

== Monument ==
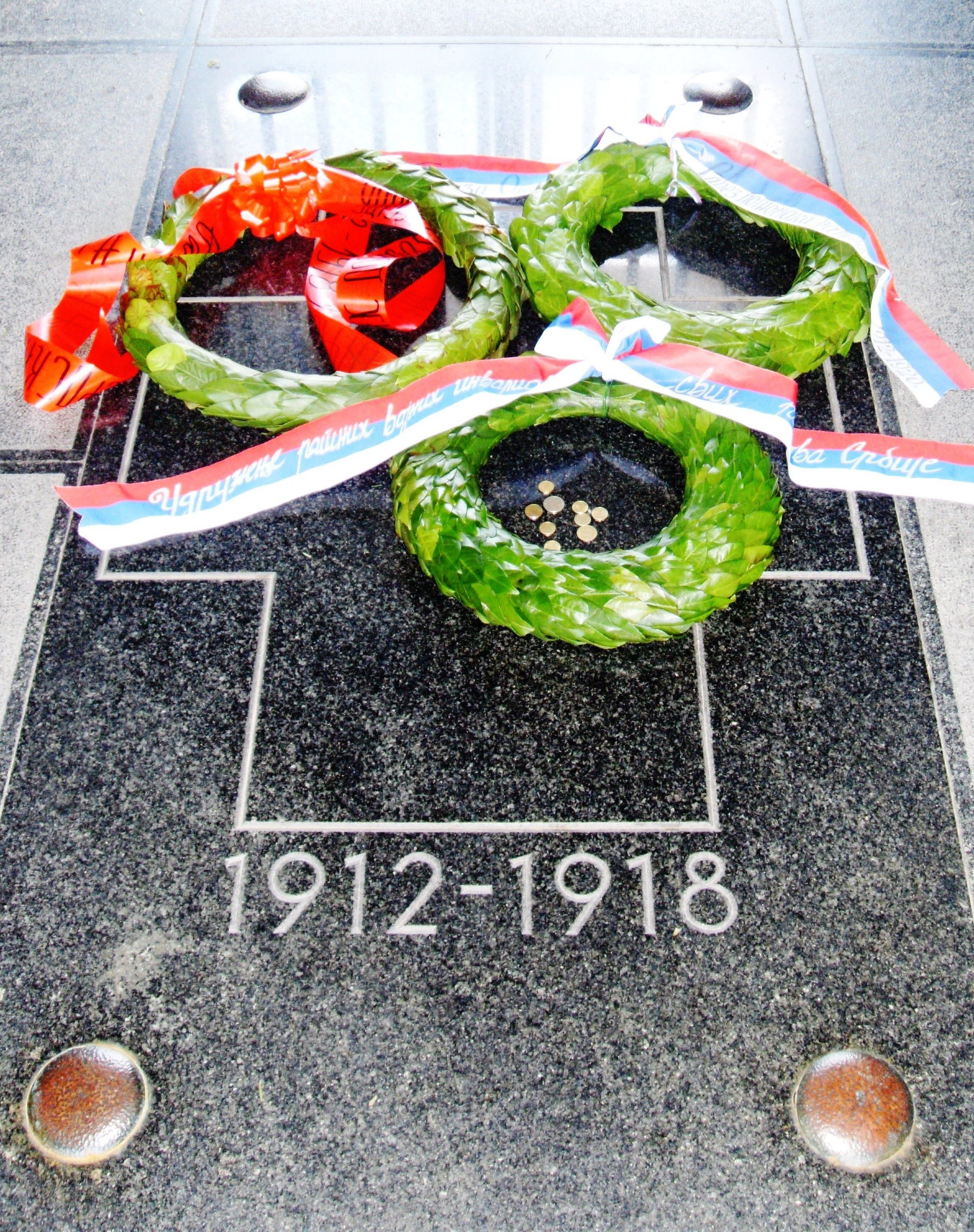
The tomb of the Unknown Hero inside the monument

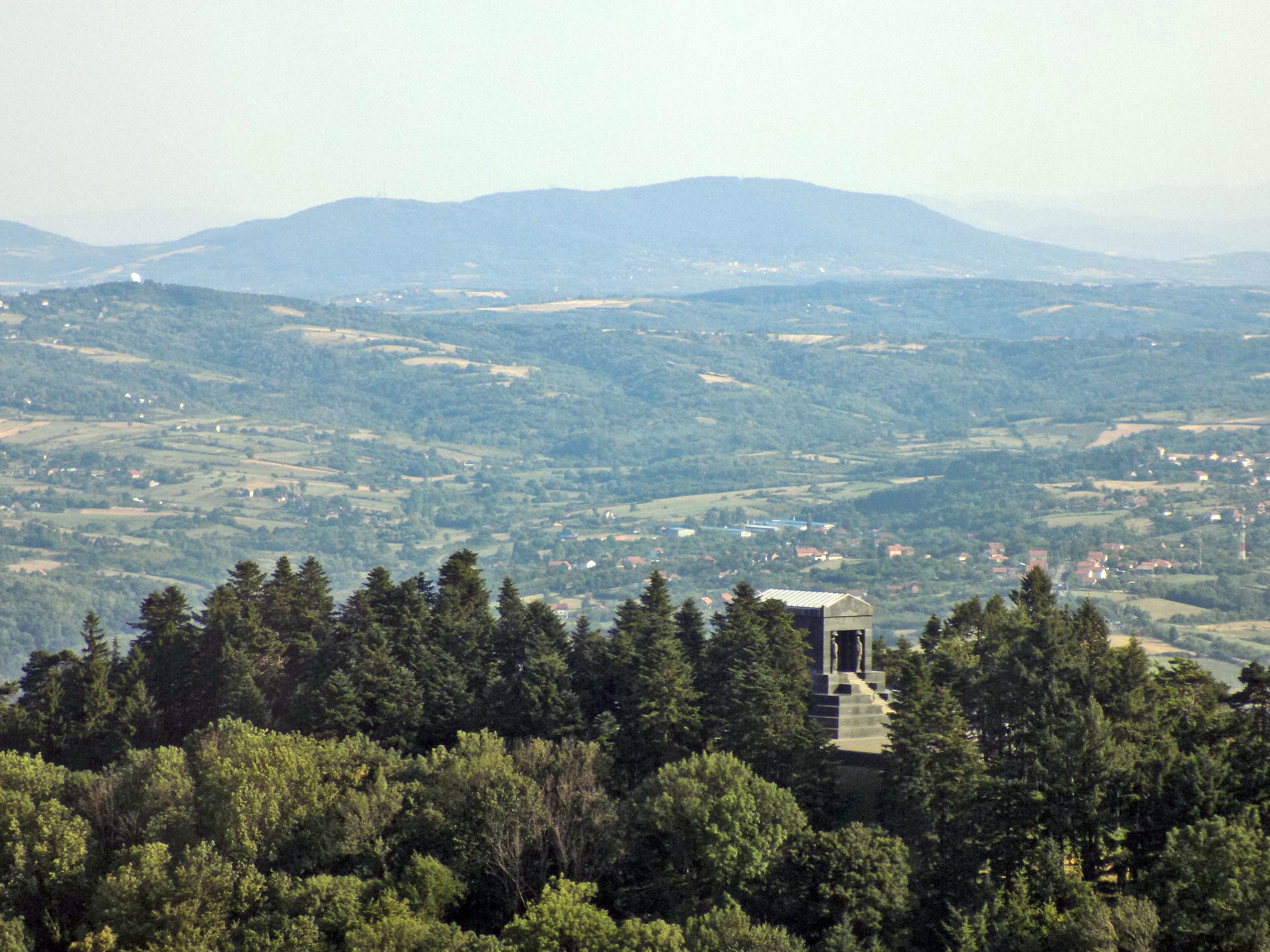
View from the Avala TV Tower

=== History ===
The construction of the new monument was ordered by King Alexander to commemorate the victims of the Balkan Wars (1912–1913) and the World War I (1914–1918). The monument was designed by Croatian sculptor Ivan Meštrović, and the main engineer was Stevan Živanović. Members of the Yugoslav Royal Army and Navy took part in processing and mounting the blocks. King Alexander I of Yugoslavia laid the foundation stone for the new monument on 28 June 1934, just few months before he was assassinated in Marseilles. Before the construction of the new monument started in 1934, the ancient fortified town of Žrnov was located atop the Avala mountain. It was then demolished by dynamite to free the space for the new monument.

The building of the new monument wasn't without the controversy. Public was against the demolition of the old Žrnov town, while the especially vocal was the author Branislav Nušić. He also protested that the monument is so distant from Belgrade, which would prevent the citizens to pay their respect. Nušić wrote: "to Avala go only the wealthy men who have cars, bringing their mistresses with them". However, King Alexander was adamant that the monument has to be built on Avala, stating "either there or nowhere", while Nušić proposed one of the central city squares, Republic Square, close to the modern Staklenac shopping center. Ironically, on that section of the square, today known as the Plateau of Zoran Đinđić, actually the monument to Branislav Nušić was erected.

The Monument to the Unknown Hero was declared Monument of Culture of Exceptional Importance in 1987, and it is protected by Republic of Serbia. The surrounding area around the monument was landscaped in 2006.

The decorative lights were out of use since the early 1990s. Reconstruction of the light system is to be finished in late February 2019. Over 100 lanterns will be placed around the monument, access paths and the plateau surrounding the monument. Of those, 14 are reflectors lighting the monument itself. They are arranged based on the original project by Meštrović. Following his ideas from 1938, the poles will be decorated later in the year, to resemble the burning torch-shaped candelabra.

=== Design ===
The monument is in the form of a sarcophagus made of black granite from Jablanica. The sarcophagus in surrounded by caryatids representing all the peoples of the Kingdom of Yugoslavia. They represent Bosnian, Montenegrin, Dalmatian, Croatian, Slovenian, Vojvodina’s, Serbian and South Serbian women. The top of the sarcophagus is marked with an inscription reading "Alexander I King of Yugoslavia to the Unknown Hero". The monument is 14.5 metres (48 ft) high, and 36 metres (118 ft) in length, while the stairs from the approaching side are 93 metres (305 ft) long. The tomb with the remains of the unknown hero is located in the crypt (underground room) in the base of the monument. The tomb is marked only by the date "1912–1918", the duration of the Balkan Wars and World War I.

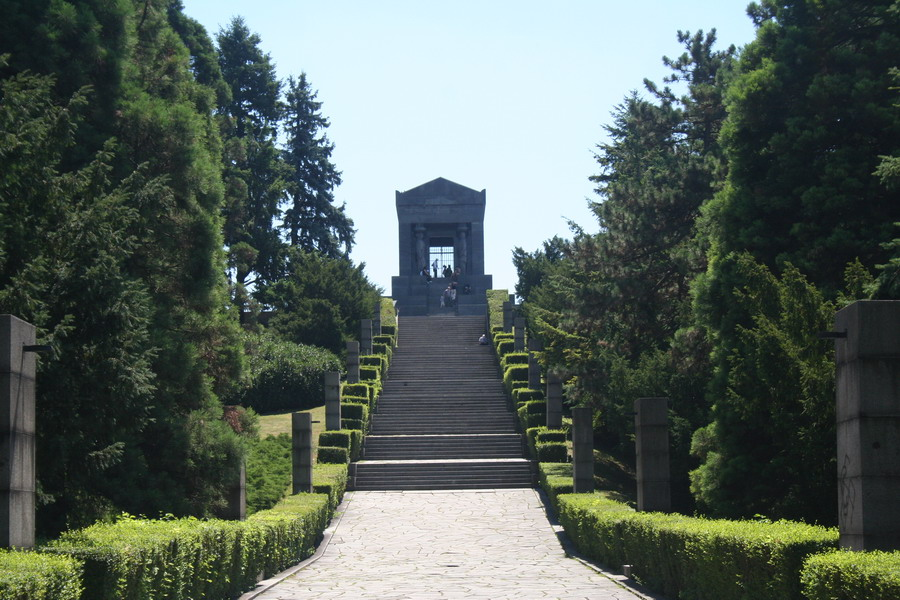
Stairs to the monument

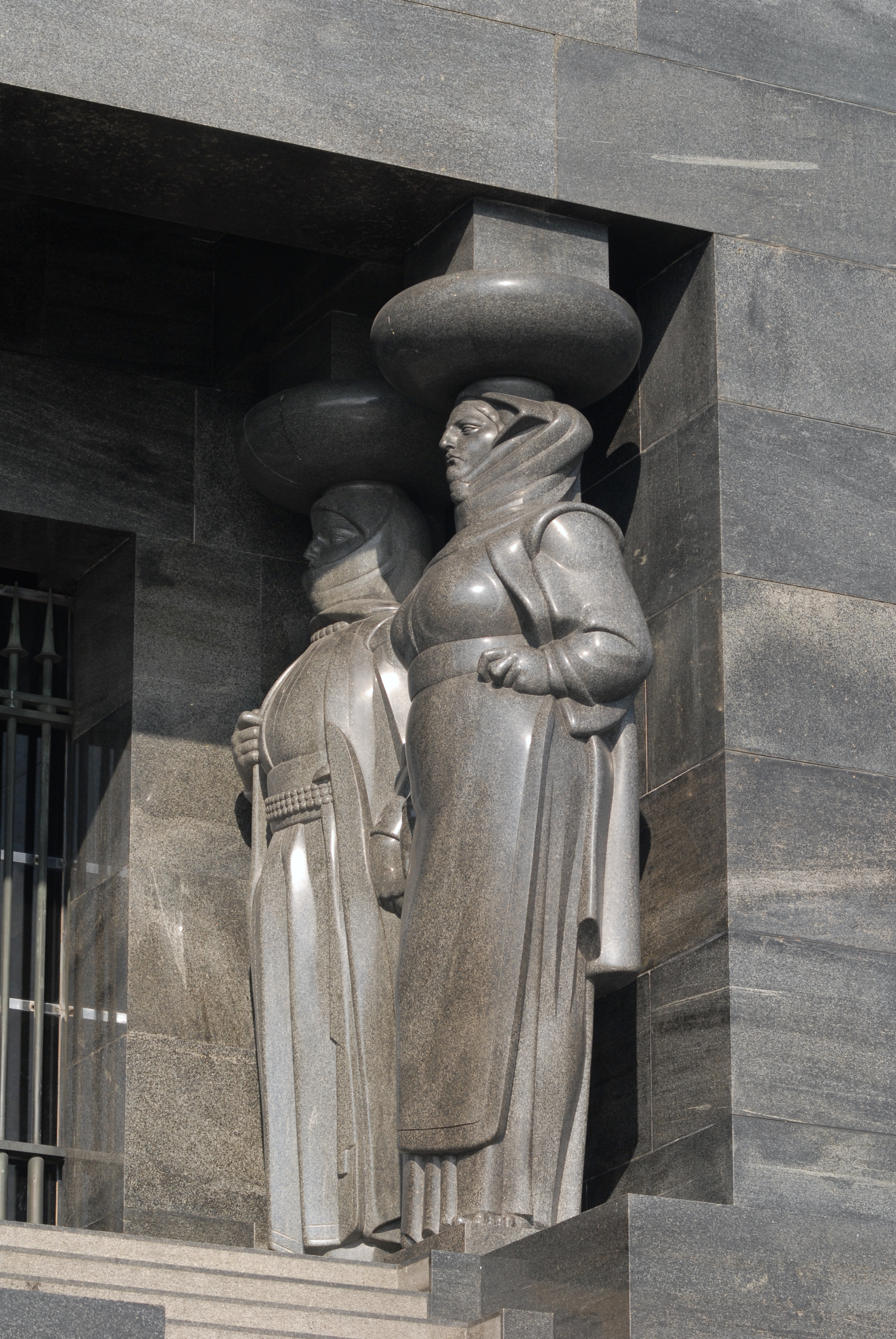
Feminine statues

There is also a deeper symbolism of the complex. The monument is placed on the five-step pyramid, which symbolizes five centuries of Ottoman occupation of Serbia. Caryatids actually represent mothers of the fallen soldiers, who are keeping the peace and sanctity of the burial place. The monument is also one of the rare such venues which is located outside of the town center. King Alexander wanted to transform the top of the Avala into the replica of the Kajmakčalan mountain which gained almost mythical importance after the 1916 Battle of Kaymakchalan between Serbia and Bulgaria, and was euphemistically called "Gate of the Homeland" or the "Altar of the Motherland". The monument was to represent the relocated commemorative chapel from Kajmakčalan and even plants which grow on that mountain, or resemble it, were planted around the monument. During the 1934–1938 period when the monument was built, the surrounding area was also forested with the specific species of conifers. They were specifically ordered from the botanical garden in Munich, Germany. A certain number of trees was donated to Yugoslavia personally by Adolf Hitler.

== Controversies ==
Some historians consider the terminology used for the complex to be erroneous. Instead of the word monument, the word tomb should be used instead: Tomb of the Unknown Hero.

=== Identity speculation ===
Based on the examination in 1921 and the properties discovered, it wasn't possible to identify the soldier or even to conclude in which unit he served. Several historians from Belgrade and Sarajevo have claimed that the unknown hero is a Bosniak named Sulejman Balić, a soldier from Duga Poljana, a town between Novi Pazar and Sjenica, that fought in the Royal Serbian Army against Austria-Hungary. But as the evidence suggest, the soldier was drafted immediately prior to the Central Powers offensive in October 1915, as he didn't receive the ID badge, so this claim is unlikely.

=== Conspiracy theories ===
Hastiness by which the Žrnov was demolished and king Alexander's insisting on building the monument on this location despite all the opposition, in time influenced numerous conspiracy theories. Conspiracies were the basis of the second season of Shadows over Balkan TV series in 2019–2020.

One of the main theories is that the monument is a Masonic temple. Reasons include suspected Masonic membership of both the king Alexander and Meštrović, and silver hammer which the king used to mark the beginning of the works. However, silver tools were used for the same purpose by the medieval Serbian rulers, so as by the king Milan who used a silver hammer when the construction of the Belgrade Main railway station began in 1881. Also, nothing in the memorial complex points to the worship function. The monument's form actually strikingly resembles the Tomb of Cyrus, built for Cyrus the Great in ancient Pasargadae, in the 6th century BC.

== Ceremonies ==
The monument is used for the official commemorations of the important historic dates. The President, Prime Minister and other officials visit the monument for the wreath-laying ceremony on dates like the Statehood Day (15 February), Victory Day (9 May), and 15 September, the date when the Macedonian front was broken through in 1918.

== See also ==
- Monument of Culture of Exceptional Importance
- Tourism in Serbia
- Tomb of Cyrus the Great

== External sources ==
- Tucić, Hajna (2008). Monument to the Unknown Hero on Avala (PDF). Belgrade: Institute for Protection of Cultural Monuments. ISBN 978-8681157329.
