= Holy Mother of God Cathedral =

Holy Mother of God Cathedral may refer to:

- Holy Mother of God Cathedral, Harich, a church in a 7th century Armenian monastery located near the village of Harich in the Shirak Province of Armenia
- Holy Mother of God Cathedral, Nicosia, an Armenian Apostolic cathedral of the Armenian Diocese of Cyprus, located in the Strovolos district in Nicosia, Cyprus
- Holy Mother of God Cathedral, Stepanakert, a church of the Armenian Apostolic Church, located in the city of Stepanakert, Nagorno-Karabakh Republic
- Holy Mother of God Cathedral, Vagharshapat, a church located in the town of Vagharshapat, Armenia
- Holy Mother of God Cathedral, Vilnius, the episcopal see of the Orthodox Christian Metropolitan of Vilnius and all Lithuania

== See also ==
- Holy Mother of God Church (disambiguation)
- Monastery of Holy Mother of God (disambiguation)
