= Suvodol monastery =

Serbian Orthodox monastery

Suvodol
- Interactive map of Suvodol

Monastery information
- Full name: Манастир Суводол
- Other name: Monastery of the Holy Mother of God
- Order: Serbian Orthodox Church
- Dedication: Holy Mother of God
- Diocese: Eparchy of Timok

Site
- Location: Selačka, Serbia
- Public access: Yes

The Suvodol monastery (Serbian Cyrillic: Манастир Суводол) is a Serbian Orthodox monastery located in the cadastral area of Selačka, a village 25 km south-east of Zaječar, in neastern Serbia. It is administratively part of the Eparchy of Timok. According to legend it was either built by the Byzantine Empire in the period between 1004 and 1008, or by Prince Lazar Hrebeljanović in the 14th century. The oldest specimen is a grave monument from 1255. The Old church was destroyed in 1865, and a new one started building in August 1866.

== See also ==
- List of heads of the Serbian Orthodox Church
- Serbian Orthodox Church
