= Žrnov =

Demolished medieval fort in Belgrade, Serbia

Coordinates: 44.6887°N 20.5158°E

Žrnov Fortress
- Тврђава Жрнов
- Belgrade; Serbia
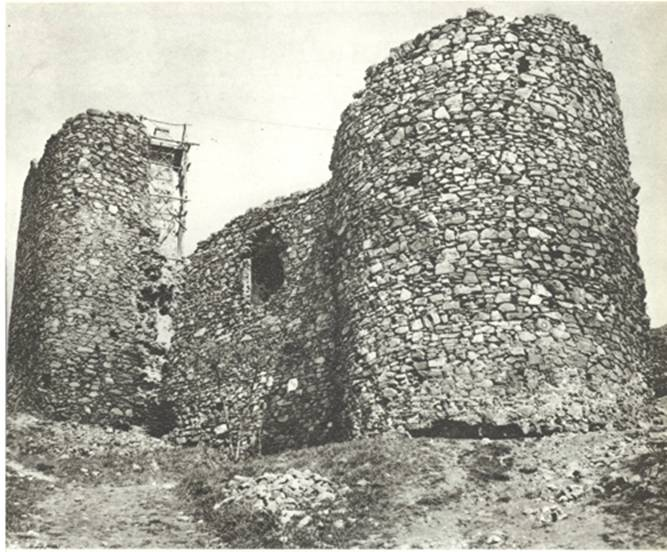
- Žrnov fortress on Avala near Belgrade, destroyed in 1934

Site information
- Condition: Demolished

Site history
- Built: Roman Era
- Built by: Roman Empire

Žrnov (Serbian Cyrillic: Жрнов) or Žrnovan (Жрнован) was a medieval fortress on the highest top of the Avala Mountain, at 511 metres (1,677 ft), in Belgrade, Serbia. The Ancient Romans had built an outpost there, and later the Serbs expanded it into a fortress. It was completely demolished in 1934 to make the way for the Monument to the Unknown Hero.

== History ==
=== Ancient period ===
The Avala had deposits of ores, most notably lead and mercury's ore of cinnabarite but mining activities which can be traced to the pre-Antiquity times. Archeologist Miloje Vasić believed that the vast mines of cinnabarite (mercury-sulfide) on Avala were crucial for the development of the Vinča culture, on the banks of the Danube circa 5700 BC. Settlers of Vinča apparently melted cinnabarite and used it in metallurgy. The first miners on Avala recorded in history were the Celtic tribe of Scordisci and it is believed that they built the first outpost on the top of the mountain.

=== Roman period ===
The top of Avala proved to be suitable for building, so the Romans built a fortified outpost, probably on the foundations of the older Celtic one. Apart from guarding and controlling the access roads to Singidunum, predecessor of Belgrade, the outpost was also important for the protection of the mines on the mountain, which were exploited by the Romans. The outpost was some 100 m (330 ft) below the top of the mountain.

After the second explosion during the demolition of the fortress in 1934, a layer from the Roman period was discovered. It consisted of a cistern for drinking water and an oven for baking bread.

=== Medieval period ===
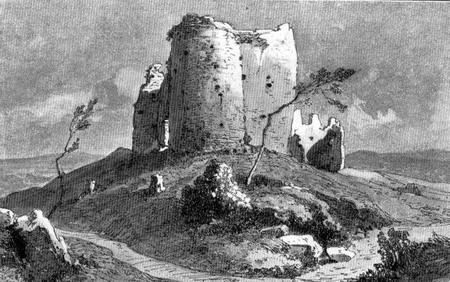
A drawing of Žrnov by Felix Philipp Kanitz, second half of the 19th century

There are no records which confirm that the Byzantines used the fort. In the first half of the 15th century, during the reign of Serbian despot Stefan Lazarević, it was expanded into a proper fortress. The data on the fort is scarce. When German naturalist and traveler Felix Philipp Kanitz visited the area in the second half of the 19th century, he made several drawings of Žrnov and wrote that "Serbian emperors" built the fort on the foundations of the Roman outpost on the top of the mountain, without specifying which "emperors" or when. During the Middle Ages, the cinnabarite was used for the fresco paintings and was exported to Greece. The expanded fortress became known as Žrnov Grad ("Žrnov Town"). It is believed that it got its name because of the large grinding stones for crushing the ores, which are called žrvanj in Serbian. The mountain Avala itself was called Žrnovica in the Middle Ages.

The Ottomans conquered the fort in 1442 and further fortified and strengthened the eastern and southern ramparts, on the orders of the Hadım Şehabeddin, a eunuch beylerbey of Rumelia Eyalet. By the Peace of Szeged, the Serbian despotate was restored and the Ottomans had to withdraw from the fortified towns: Golubac, Kruševac, Novo Brdo and Žrnov.

=== Ottoman period ===
After both the Hungarian military commander John Hunyadi and the Serbian despot Đurađ Branković died in 1456, the Ottomans attacked Serbia again, capturing the fort in 1458 and the whole of Serbia in 1459, but they failed to take Belgrade, which was held by the Hungarians. Hadım Şehabeddin again expanded and strengthened it in preparation for the attack on Belgrade. With expansion of the walls and ramparts and the building of the dry moat, they effectively turned it into the starting point of the constant harassment of the Hungarian defenders of Belgrade. The Ottomans began calling the fort havala, which means obstacle, and that gave the name to the entire Avala mountain. One of the surviving Serbian sources say that "from the ruins of the medieval little town of Žrnov, which was named Avala, the Turks built a proper marauders' tower, roofed with lead. From there, they ruled the Belgrade surroundings, which became almost completely desolate". Using artillery, the Hungarians attempted to retake Žrnov in 1515 but were decisively defeated, losing all their heavy artillery. Another Serbian inscription from 6 May 1515 mentions the battle and the fort, now already called Avala: разби Балиль бегь Јаноша хердељскога војеводу подь Хаваломь ("Bali-beg defeated John of Erdely under [H]avala").

The Ottomans were unsuccessful in conquering Belgrade in the next six decades. They finally took Belgrade in 1521 and after that, the fort lost its strategic importance. Still, the Ottoman traveler Evliya Çelebi, who visited the region in the 1660s, described Žrnov as one of the six most important forts in Serbia. It is not known for sure when the fort was abandoned, but the last garrison left it probably in the 18th century when the maintenance of the edifice also stopped. Porča of Avala, a mythical figure celebrated in folks songs, dwelt in the town according to legend.

=== World War I ===
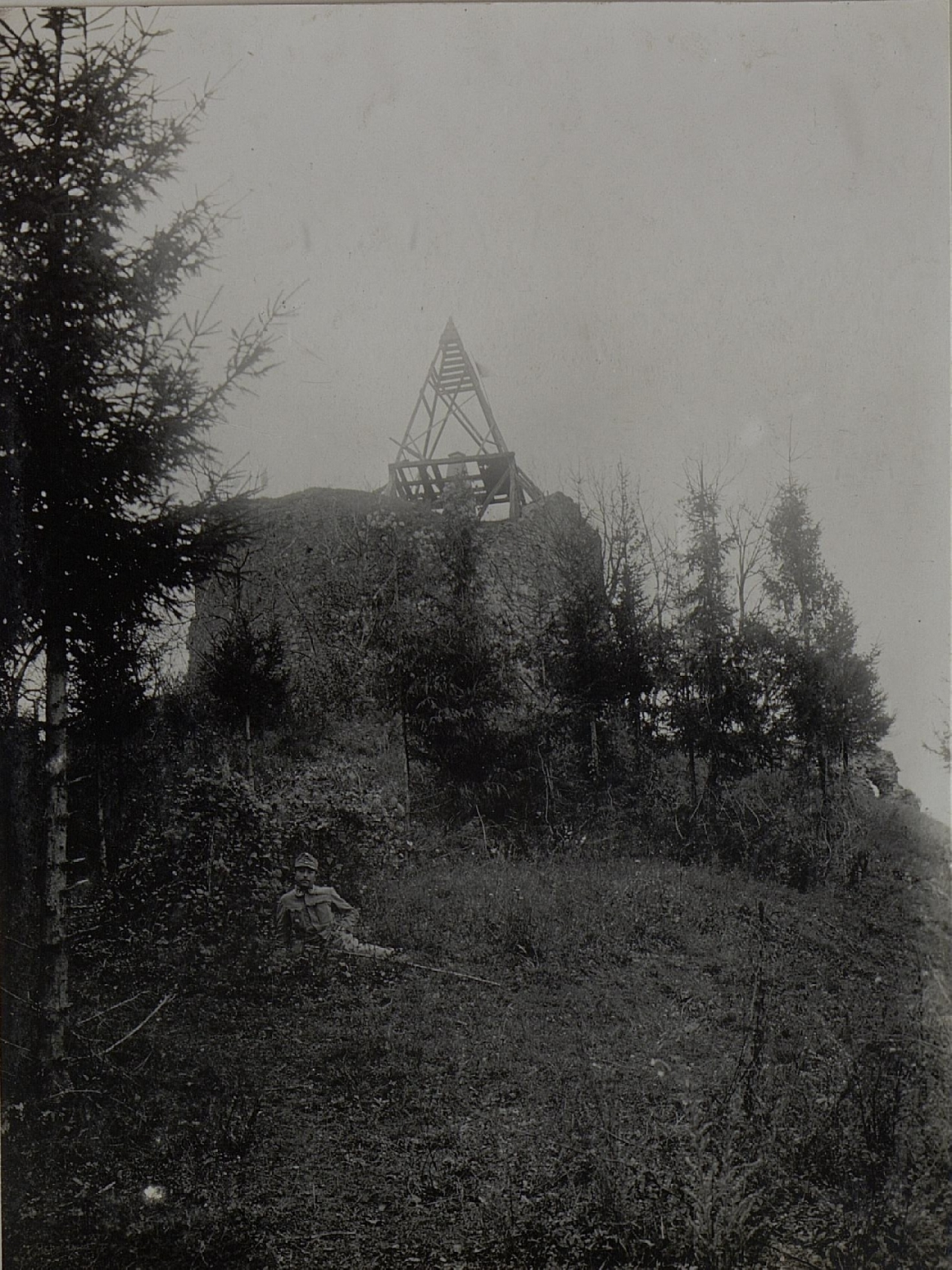
Žrnov in October 1915, after the battle

On the night of 13/14 October 1915, the combined squad of Belgrade's Defense held the line of Avala-Zuce, against the joint Austro-Hungarian and German offensive. Austro-Hungarian 9th Hill brigade of the 59th Division took the front rim of Avala on 16 October, with an assignment to push Serbian forces from the mountain. The Austro-Hungarians were reinforced with one German half-battalion. However, one Serbian battalion successfully defended the top of Avala against the Austro-Hungarian battalions of the 49th and 84th regiments, aided by the 204th German reserve infantry regiment. On the same day, the command of the Belgrade's Defense ordered a retreat to the new positions so on 17 October occupational forces reached the southern section of Avala, conquering the entire mountain. Their soldiers then buried Serbian combatants who were killed in action. In the valley, below Žrnov, on the grave of one of them, they placed a wooden cross with the inscription in German: "One unknown Serbian soldier".

== Characteristics ==
Žrnov consisted of two sections: Gornji Grad or Mali Grad (Upper or Small Town) and Donji Grad (Lower Town). Upper Town consisted of the old Serbian fortress, with some Ottoman expansions from 1442. In 1458 a dry moat was dug the separate it from the Lower Town. It had the base in the shape of regular pentagon, aligned in the northwest-southeast direction. It occupied the area where the Monument to the Unknown Hero is today. Lower Town mostly occupied the ramparts, which followed the outline of the mountain slope. It was a direct continuation of the Upper Town.

The entire northwestern rampart was actually a strong, fortified tower, in the shape of an irregular semi-circle. It served as a major protective shield as it faced down the ridge, watching over the easiest access road to the fortress. On that location today are stairs which connect the flag pole with the monument. From the fortified tower, the ramparts spread a bit towards the peak, where two semi-circled towers were built, opposite to each other. From there, the walls narrowed towards the flat southeast section of the ramparts. In the center of this flat area there was another semi-circled tower, while on the southern tip of the pentagram there was a squared tower-gate.

The rampart which encircled the Lower Town, effectively forming it, began at the fortified tower on the southwest, making a semi-circled turn to the south where it additionally extended to the southeast following the slope. After that spot, the wall went in almost the straight line to the northwest until it reconnected with the wall of the Upper Town. There was another dry moat encircling the entire fortress, which closely followed the shape of the outer walls. The entry gate into the fortress was located in the most southwestern point of the ramparts, on the central position of the semi-circled section.

=== Development ===
The oldest part of the complex was Upper (Little) Town, without two towers on the southeast rampart. It was built in Medieval Serbia, but the exact date is not known. In 1442 Ottomans strengthened the eastern wall, from the semi-circled tower to the southeastern rampart, also adding the other semi-circled tower in the middle section of the southeastern rampart and square tower-gate on the rampart's southern end. Last phase was the addition of the outer rampart and digging of the dry moat around it after 1458. The complete area occupied by the fort complex covered 3,500 m^{2} (38,000 sq ft).

== Monument to the unknown soldier ==
=== Origin ===
In the late 1920, a popular news topic in Serbia was the burial of the French "unknown soldier" in Panthéon. Existing commemorative cross from 1915 was known only locally and to the Avala visitors. In the first half of 1921 the initiative to build a more dignified commemorative mark gained momentum. On 24 June 1921, president of the Constitutional Assembly, Ivan Ribar, summoned state dignitaries to the meeting with the agenda of constructing the monument and it was decided that the future monument will be "dignified...but humble".

The first step was to determine whether it was indeed a Serbian soldier in the grave under the wooden cross. An exhumation was conducted by the commission on 23 November 1921. Parts of the grenade are found under the skull, almost as a pillow, while the skeleton had the blown left side of the chest, so it is estimated that he was killed by an Austro-Hungarian howitzer while he was watching from the lookout. He was apparently buried in the crater formed by the explosion of the very grenade that killed him, just below Žrnov. The soldier had no identity badge which suggests that he was either member of the Third Call regiments (with soldiers over 38 years old) or was drafted immediately prior to the battle which is probably correct as the skeletal remains indicated a very young male, no older than 19–20 years. It was said that his skull was "small, like of a boy" and that skeleton was petite, of a boyish, thin stature. Some sources actually claim he was only 15. Based on the other findings in the grave, the commission concluded that the remains do belong to the Serbian soldier and reburied him, with the grenade parts, while his personal belongings were taken to the cabinet of the president of the assembly for safekeeping.

The monument was built near the place where an earlier cross dedicated to the unknown soldier was built. The monument was built from 1 April 1922 to 1 June 1922. The base was a two-leveled square pedestal with a regular, four-sided pyramid made of the roughly dressed stone. The base of the pyramid was 3 m × 3 m (9.8 ft × 9.8 ft) and it was 5 m (16 ft) tall. Four jardinières were leaned on each side of the pyramid, with the seedlings of the common box. They were hexagonally shaped and also made of the roughly dressed stone. On top of the pyramid a six-armed cross was placed. On the eastern side of the pedestal a plate was placed with the inscription: "To the fallen heroes in the wars for liberation and unification 1912-1918, this monument is erected by the thankful people of the Vračar District. Consecrated on 1 June 1922". On the other three side the inscriptions simply said "cross (made) of Carrara marble". On the western side of the horizontal arm of the cross another inscription read: "Unknown Serbian soldier confirmed by the commission on 29 November 1921". The monument was encircled by 16 short stone pillars, 4 on each side, connected with chains. Remains of the unknown soldier were placed in the metal coffin and walled in the monument, together with the small wooden case in the colors of the Serbian flag containing the grenade parts, and remains of another three unidentified soldiers which were discovered in the foothills of Avala.

On 28 June 1938, when the new monument was finished, the remains of the unknown soldier were taken from the old coffin, washed in white wine, wrapped in white linen and placed in the new metal coffin which was moved to the crypt inside the new monument. Remains of the other three soldiers were placed in the memorial ossuary in Belgrade Fortress. Personal belongings of the soldier were handed over to the Military Museum, also on the Fortress, but they disappeared later. The old monument was completely demolished, except for the six-armed cross which was moved to the churchyard of the Church of Saint Mary Magdalene in Beli Potok, on the foothills of Avala, where it is still located.

== New monument ==
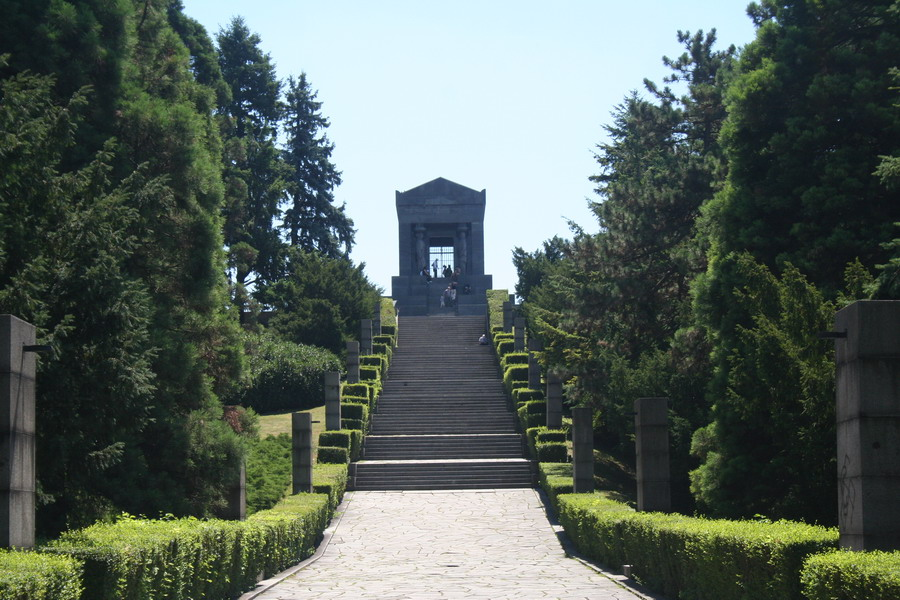
Monument to the Unknown Hero, built atop the demolished Žrnov

The construction of the new monument was ordered by King Alexander to commemorate the victims of the Balkan Wars (1912–1913) and the World War I (1914-1918). The monument was designed by Croatian sculptor Ivan Meštrović, and the main engineer was Stevan Živanović. King Alexander I of Yugoslavia laid the foundation stone for the new monument on 28 June 1934.

=== Demolition ===
The remains of the fortifications were demolished by dynamite in 1934, in order to clear the site for the construction of the new monument, that is, an entire complex of the mausoleum.

The building of the new monument wasn't without controversy. The public was against the demolition of the old Žrnov Town, while the author Branislav Nušić was especially vocal. He also protested that the monument is so distant from Belgrade, which would prevent the citizens to pay their respect. Nušić wrote: "to Avala go only the wealthy men who have cars, bringing their mistresses with them". However, King Alexander was adamant that the monument had to be built on Avala, stating "either there or nowhere", while Nušić proposed one of the central city squares, Republic Square, close to the modern Staklenac shopping center. Ironically, on that section of the square, today known as the Plateau of Zoran Đinđić, actually the monument to Branislav Nušić was erected.

The demolition began on 18 April 1934 and lasted for two days, in three series of explosions, as the fortress was sturdy, massive and well preserved. Nothing survived of the entire edifice. Historiography cannot explain why King Alexander was so insistent on destroying both the old monument and the Žrnov and building the new monument on the same spot. The king was assassinated in Marseilles on 9 October 1934, three and a half months after he laid the foundation stone for the new monument, which was finished on 28 June 1938. No visible remains of Žrnov exist today.

== See also ==
- Tourism in Serbia
- Monument to the Unknown Hero
- List of fortresses in Serbia

== Sources ==
- Bogdanović, Branko (6 August 2017). "Mesto poklonjenja onima koji se iz boja nisu vratili" [Memorial place for those who didn't return from the battle]. Politika-Magazin, No. 1036 (in Serbian). pp. 27–29.
- "How Žrnov was destroyed" (in Serbian). Archived from the original on 19 August 2011.
- Jakšić, Branka (24 September 2017), "Pogled s neba i podzemne avanture" [A view from the sky and underground adventures], Politika (in Serbian)
- "Junak dočekao majstore" [Hero welcomed handymen]. Večernje Novosti (in Serbian). 14 July 2006.
- Nikolić, Zoran (31 July 2013). "Beogradske priče: Ko je Neznani junak?" [Belgrade Stories: Who is the unknown hero?]. Večernje Novosti (in Serbian).
- "Spomenik Neznanom junaku na Avali" Споменик незнаном јунаку на Авали [Monument to the Unknown Hero on Avala] (in Serbian). National Center for Digitization. n.d.
- Srejović, Dragoslav; Gavrilović, Slavko; Ćirković, Sima M. (1982). Istorija srpskog naroda: knj. Od najstarijih vremena do Maričke bitke (1371) [History of the Serbian people: From the earliest times to the Battle of Marička (1371)]. Srpska književna zadruga. p. 254.
- Srpska enciklopedija (in Serbian). Vol. II. Matica srpska and Serbian Academy of Sciences and Arts. 2013. pp. 142–143. ISBN 978-86-7946-121-6.
- Todorović, Aleksandar (30 October 2017). "Avala krije svoje tajne" [Avala is hiding its secrets]. Politika (in Serbian). p. 32.
- Topalović, Lazar S.; Mitrović, Čedomir (30 June 2010). "Tajne Beograda: Nerasvetljena tajna kralja Aleksandra" [Secrets of Belgrade: unresolved mystery of King Alexander] (in Serbian). Vesti-online.
- Tucić, Hajna (2008). Monument to the Unknown Hero on Avala (PDF). Belgrade: Institute for Protection of Cultural Monuments. ISBN 978-868115732-9.
- "Zašto je kralj Aleksandar žrtvovao srednjovekovni grad Žrnov" [Why King Alexander sacrificed the medieval town of Žrnov] (in Serbian). Crveneberetke. 13 August 2013.
