= Felix Philipp Kanitz =

Austro-Hungarian naturalist, geographer, ethnographer, archaeologist, painter and author

Felix Philipp Kanitz פליקס פיליפ קאניץ
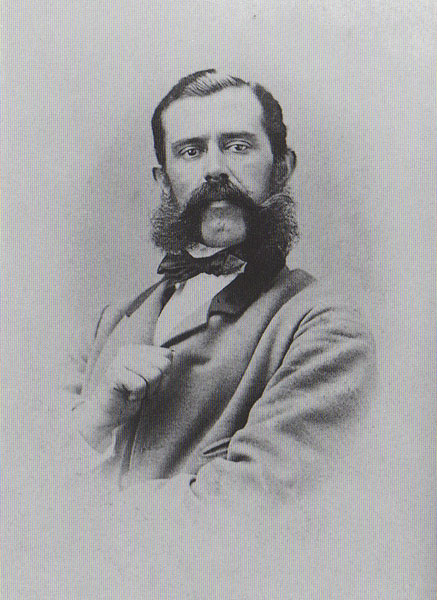
- Photography from ca. 1865.
- Born: 2 August 1829; Pest, Kingdom of Hungary
- Died: 8 January 1904 (aged 74); Vienna, Austria-Hungary
- Citizenship: Hungarian
- Education: University of Vienna
- Scientific career
- Fields: Archaeology; Ethnography; Geography; Natural history Painting

Felix Philipp Kanitz (Hebrew: פליקס פיליפ קאניץ. 2 August 1829 – 8 January 1904) was an Austro-Hungarian naturalist, geographer, ethnographer, archaeologist, painter and author of travel notes, of Jewish heritage.

== Biography ==
Kanitz was born in Pest to a wealthy Jewish family and enrolled in art in the University of Vienna in 1846, at the age of seventeen.

He travelled extensively after 1850, visiting Germany, France, Belgium and Italy. He settled in Vienna in 1856 and undertook a journey to Dalmatia in the Balkans in 1858, which marked the beginning of his thorough research of the South Slavs. Apart from Dalmatia, he also visited Bosnia and Herzegovina, Kingdom of Montenegro, Serbia and Bulgaria. He worked on the topic until 1889, the knowledge he gathered being evaluated as particularly important for the period. A good painter and drawer, Kanitz was also the author of a number of black and white drawings related to the life in the Balkans. Born a Jew, he later converted to Christianity. Between 1870 and 1874 he was the first custodian of the Anthropologisch-Urgeschichtliches Museum in Vienna. He died in the Austrian capital on 8 January 1904.

Kanitz is regarded as one of the first profound ethnographers of the South Slavs. As such, he has earned great respect particularly in modern Serbia and Bulgaria.

Kanitz was a member of the Serbian Academy of Sciences and Arts.

== Honours ==
- Order of Franz Joseph
- Order of the Cross of Takovo
- Order of St. Sava
- Royal Saxon Academy of Forestry
- Member Serbian Academy of Sciences and Arts
- A village in Vidin Province in northwestern Bulgaria and streets in Sofia and Varna are named after him.
- Kanitz Nunatak on Graham Land in Antarctica is named after Felix Kanitz.

== Works ==
=== Monographs ===
- 1861: Die römischen Funde in Serbien. k.k. Hof- und Staatsdruckerei, Wien (Google)
- 1862: Serbiens byzantinische Monumente. k.k. Hof- und Staatsdruckerei, Wien (ETH Zürich)
- 1864: Über alt- und neuserbische Kirchenbaukunst. Ein Beitrag zur Kunstgeschichte. Wien: k.k. Hof- und Staatsdruckerei (Google)
- 1868: Reise in Süd-Serbien und Nord-Bulgarien. Ausgeführt im Jahre 1864. Wien: kaiserlich-königliche Hof- und Staatsdruckerei (Google)
- 1868: Serbien. Historisch-ethnographische Reisestudien aus den Jahren 1859–1868. Leipzig: Hermann Fries (Google)
- 1870: Katechismus der Ornamentik oder Leitfaden über die Geschichte, Entwickelung und die charakteristischen Formen der bedeutendsten Ornamentstyle aller Zeiten. Leipzig: J.J. Weber
  - druhé upravené vydání Auflage 1877 udT Katechismus der Ornamentik oder Leitfaden über die Geschichte, Entwickelung und die charakteristischen Formen der bedeutendsten Verzierungsstyle aller Zeiten. (Google)
  - čtvrté vydání 1891
- 1875–1879: Donau-Bulgarien und der Balkan. 3 svazky. Leipzig: Hermann Fries
  - Band I: Historisch-geographisch-ethnographische Reisestudien aus den Jahren 1860–1875 (1875) (Google) (Internet Archive), (MDZ)
  - Band II: Historisch-geographisch-ethnographische Reisestudien aus den Jahren 1860–1876 (1877) (https://books.google.de/books?id=LjbZCVE91M0C Google])
  - Band III: Historisch-geographisch-ethnographische Reisestudien aus den Jahren 1860–1878 (1879), (Internet Archive), (MDZ)
    - 1879–1880: Donau-Bulgarien und der Balkan. Historisch-geographisch-ethnographische Reisestudien aus den Jahren 1860–1879; druhé přepracované vydání. 3 svazky. Hermann Fries, Leipzig (Band I/II: 1879, Band III: 1880)
    - 1882: Donau-Bulgarien und der Balkan. Historisch-geographisch-ethnographische Reisestudien aus den Jahren 1860–1879; druhé přepracované vydání. 3 svazky. Renger, Leipzig (Band I/II Internet Archive), (Band III Internet Archive) dotisk druhého vydání, Leipzig. (Note: Práva ke Kanitzově knize přešla po Friesově smrti nak Rengersche Buchhandlung. Vydání z roku 1882, nyní vydané společností Renger, a za výrazně levnější prodejní cenu než vydání Friesovo, mimo jiné neochotně „schválil“ i Kanitz, protože neměl prostředky, jak proti tomu úspěšně zakročit.)
    - francouzské vydání v jednom svazku 1882: La Bulgarie Danubienne et le Balkan. Études de voyage (1860–1880). Hachette et C^{ie.}, Paris (Internet Archive)
- 1892: Römische Studien in Serbien: Der Donau-Grenzwall, das Strassennetz, die Städte, Castelle, Denkmale, Thermen und Bergwerke zur Römerzeit im Königreiche Serbien. F. Tempsky, Wien
- 1904–1914 (posmrtně): Das Königreich Serbien und das Serbenvolk von der Römerzeit bis zur Gegenwart. 3 svazky. Leipzig: Bernhard Meyer
  - Band I (1904): Land und Bevölkerung (Internet Archive)
  - Band II (sebráno a doplněno Bogoljubem Jovanovićem, 1909): Land und Bevölkerung (Internet Archive)
  - Band III (sebráno a doplněno Bogoljubem Jovanovićem, 1914): Staat und Gesellschaft (Internet Archive)

=== Essays ===
- 1862: Von Belgrad nach Salonik. In: Illustrirte Zeitung (Leipzig), 38, Nr. 973 (22. Februar 1862), S. 122.
- 1865: Ein Tag in türkischer Gefangenschaft. Reiseskizze. In: Slavische Blätter, Illustrirte Zeitschrift für die Gesammtinteressen des Slaventhums 1, Fasz. 4 (1865), S. 185–194.
- 1872: Das Völker-Kaleidoskop am Lomflusse in Westbulgarien. In: Globus. Illustrirte Zeitschrift für Länder- und Völkerkunde 21, Nr. 3 (Januar 1872), S. 41 f.
- 1873: Reise im bulgarischen Donau-, Timok- und Sveti Nikola-Balkan-Gebiet. In: Mittheilungen der k.k. geographischen Gesellschaft in Wien 1872, Band 15 (Neue Serie 5) (1873), S. 61–72, 105–112.
- 1873: Reiseskizzen aus Bulgarien. In: Illustrirte Zeitung 60, Nr. 1549 (8. März 1873), S. 172–174.
- 1876: Mythe und Wirklichkeit auf dem höchsten Balkanpasse. In: Neue Freie Presse (Wien), Nr. 4087 Morgenausgabe (12. Januar 1876), S. 1 f.
- 1876: Die Messe zu Eski-Džumaja. In: Oesterreichische Monatsschrift für den Orient 2, Nr. 3 (März 1876), S. 33 f.
- 1877: Der Balkanpass von Elena. In: Mittheilungen der kais. und kön. geographischen Gesellschaft in Wien 20 (Neue Serie 10) (1877), S. 537–543.
- 1880: Geistige und materielle Verhältnisse zu Sofia. In: Oesterreichische Monatsschrift für den Orient 6, Nr. 3 (März 1880), S. 41–46.
- 1880: Der Pontushafen Varna im Mai 1880. In: Oesterreichische Monatsschrift für den Orient 6, Nr. 6 (Juni 1880), S. 93–98.

=== Works ===
- 1861: Die römischen Funde in Serbien (The Roman Finds in Serbia). Vienna.
- 1862: Serbiens byzantinische Monumente (The Byzantine Monuments of Serbia). Vienna.
- 1863: Beiträge zur Kartographie des Fürstenthums Serbien, gesammelt auf seinen Reisen in denJahren 1859-61. Wien.
- 1868: Reise in Südserbien und Nordbulgarien (A Journey to South Serbia and North Bulgaria). Vienna.
- 1868: Serbien — historisch-ethnographische Reisestudien (Serbia — Ethnographic and Historical Travel Studies). Leipzig.
- 1868: Reise in Südserbien und Nordbulgarien.
- 1877: Katechismus der Ornamentik (Catechism of the Decoration). Leipzig.
- 1882: Donau-Bulgarien und der Balkan (Danubian Bulgaria and the Balkans). Three volumes. Leipzig.
- 1889: Die prähistorischen Funde in Serbien bis 1889. Aeltere und neuere Grabdenkmalformen im Königreich Serbien.
- 1892: Römische Studien in Serbien. Der Donau-Grenzwall, das Strassennetz, die Städte, Castelle, Denkmale, Thermen und Bergwerke zur Römerzeit im Königr. Serbien.
- 1892: Römische Studien in Serbien (Roman Studies in Serbia). Vienna.
- 1904: Das Königreich Serbien und das Serbenvolk von der Römerzeit bis zur Gegenwart (The Kingdom of Serbia and the Serbian People from Roman Times until the Present). First volume. Leipzig.

== Gallery ==
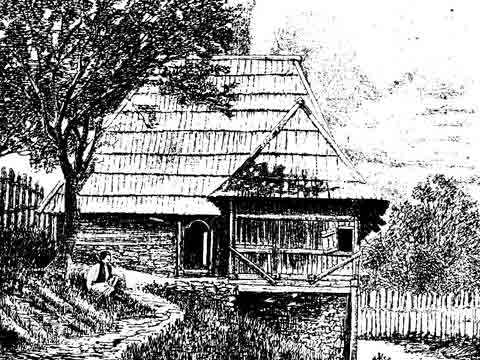
A drawing by Felix Kanitz of Milos Obrenovic house

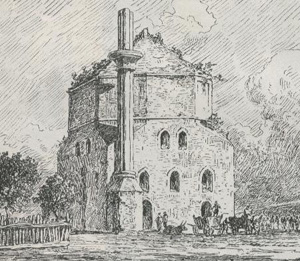
A drawing by Felix Kanitz of Belgrade mosque

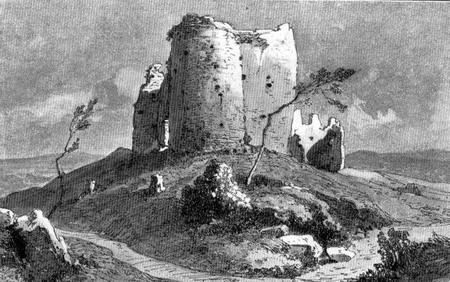
A drawing by Felix Kanitz of Zrnov

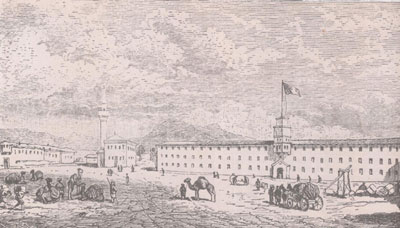
A drawing by Felix Kanitz of the first factory in the Balkans

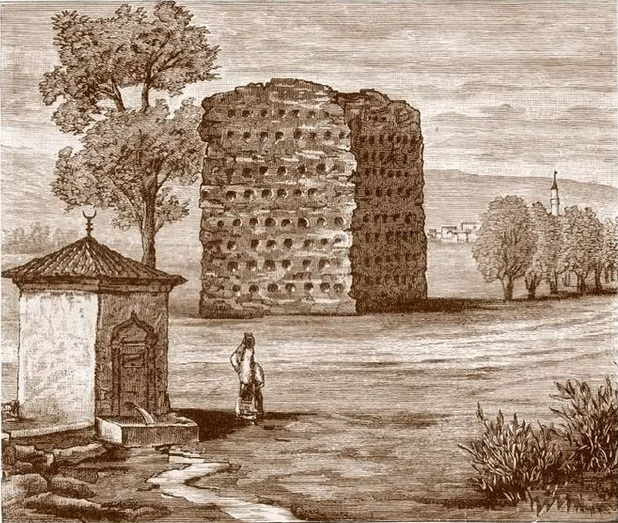
A drawing by Felix Kanitz of Ćele Kula, 1863
