= Monastery of the Theotokos, Kuršumlija =

Defunct Serbian Orthodox monastery

Coordinates: 43°08′20″N 21°17′26″E

Monastery of the Theotokos
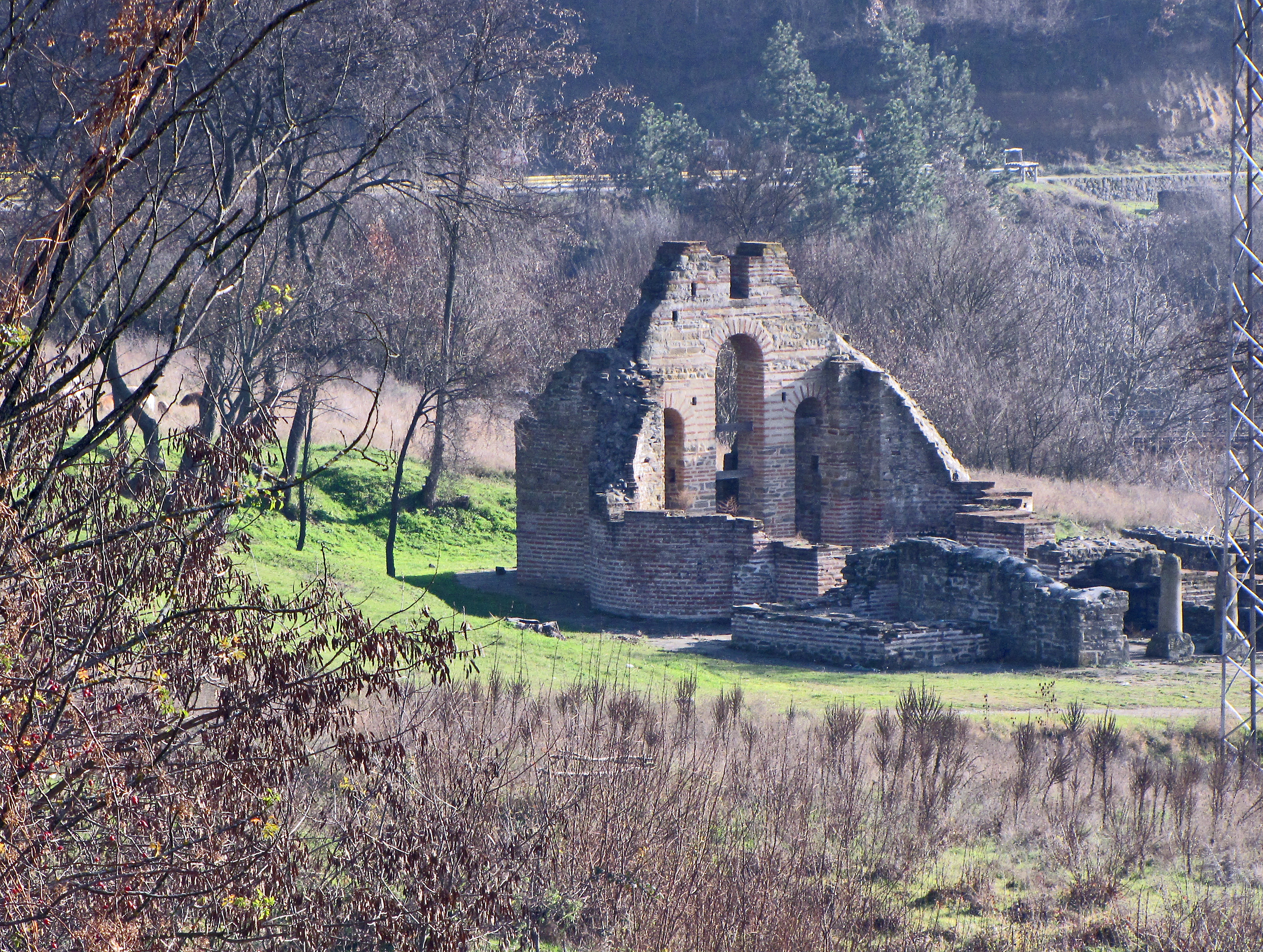

- Location within Serbia

Religion
- Affiliation: Serbian Orthodox Church

Location
- Location: Kuršumlija, Serbia
- Interactive map of Monastery of the Theotokos

Architecture
- Cultural Heritage of Serbia
- Type: Cultural Monument of Exceptional Importance
- Designated: 18 November 1947
- Reference no.: SK 207

The Monastery of the Theotokos (Serbian Cyrillic: Манастир пресвете Богородице), also known as Petkovača (Петковача), is a defunct Serbian Orthodox monastery, currently in ruins, built by Serbian Grand Prince Stefan Nemanja sometime between 1159 and 1168. The monastery is located on a plateau between the Kosanica and Toplica rivers, and near the entrance of Kuršumlija.

== History ==
The order in which Stefan Nemanja built the monasteries in Kuršumlija is a subject of debate. According to his son and biographer, Stefan the First-Crowned, the monastery was built between 1159 and 1168, as a result of a meeting with the Byzantine Emperor Manuel Komnenos. It was placed at the site of an early Byzantine basilica, which dated from the time of Justinian's restoration. Others think that the St. Nicolas Church was the first monastery in the series to be built. These monasteries were of a similar construction; they were called "the White Churches" because of the way in which the sun reflected off of their leaden roofs, and that is possibly why that area is today called Bela Crkva ("White Church").

The monastery was first built as a nunnery. Stefan Nemanja's wife was one of its first caretakers, and during the course of her supervision, she became a nun. After her death, she became a saint under the name Saint Anastasia. Some of the famous women who came here included Agripina of the Balšić family and Ottoman consort Mara Branković, the daughter of Serbian Despot Đurađ Branković (r. 1427—1456), married to Sultan Murad II (r. 1421–44; 1446–51). After her husband died, Mara was given Toplica as a gift by her step-son Mehmed II. In 1451, Mara went to Kuršumlija and became a nun in the Holy Mother of God Church.

From the second half of the 15th century onwards, there are almost no sources mentioning the monastery. The research of Olga Zirojević indicates that based on annual income, the monastery was only active between 1455 and 1530, and in 1661, traveling Turkish writer Evliya Çelebi made mention of an abandoned church in the area. In the 18th century, according to a legend, the church was torn down and used to build "Isak's Mill". A century later, Austrian painter and traveling writer Felix Kanitz recorded that very little remained of the structure.

Today, the monastery is in ruins, but it remains an important cultural monument. It is protected by the government of Serbia.

== Architecture ==
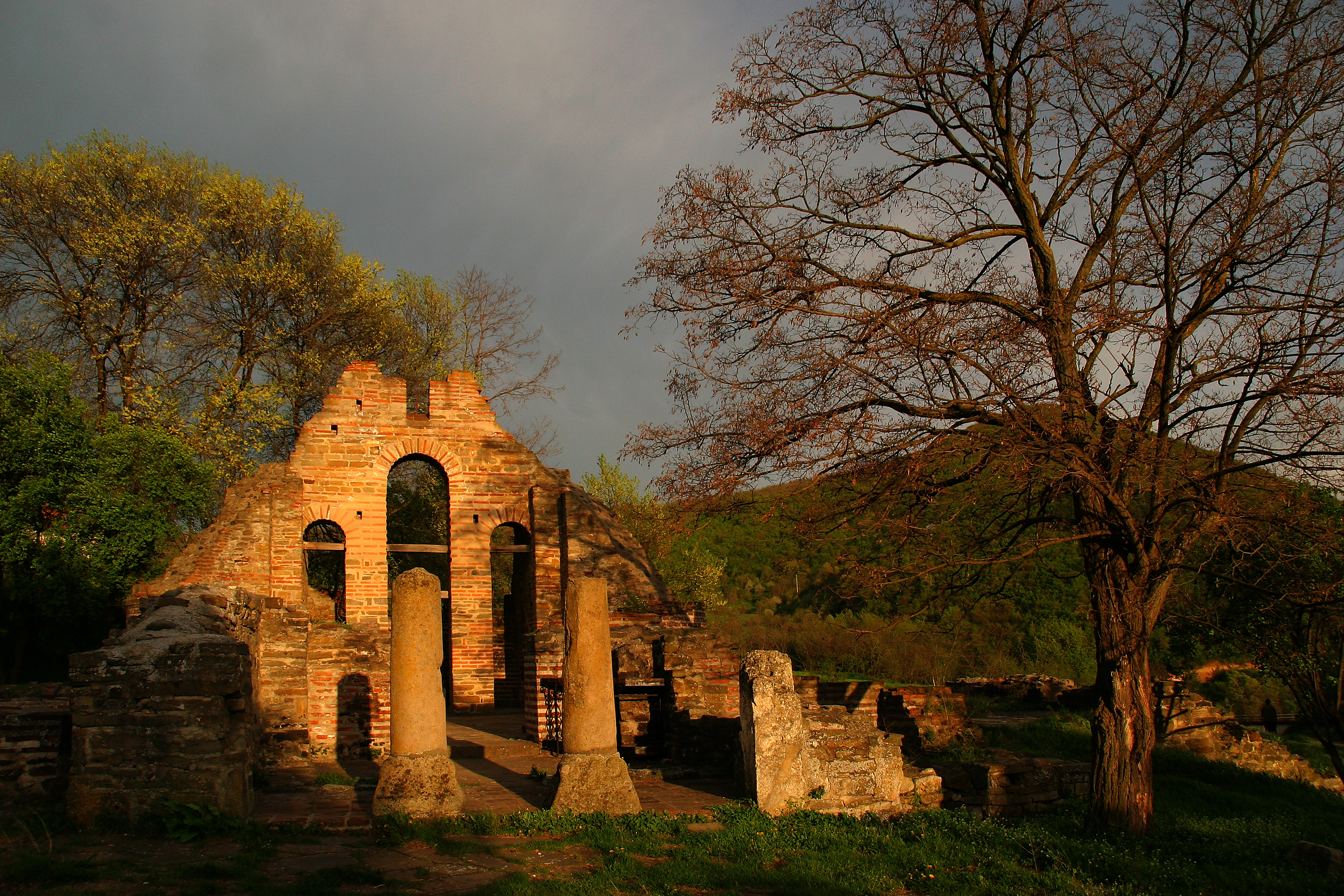
Remained ruins.

Speculations can be made from the remains of the church as to its original appearance. The church apparently had different architectural traits from other churches in Serbia, even though it belongs to the Raška style chronologically. The base of the church has a triconch shape, and on the eastern side is an altar apse which is triangular on the outside and round on the inside, unlike traditional Serbian side apses, which are semicircular in shape both outside and inside. The altar itself is separated from the nave with two columns. There is no iconostasis. The nave was covered with a dome, but nothing of the dome remains today. The narthex, rebuilt in the 14th century, was the same width as the nave, with two rectangular rooms on the north and south sides. Excavations in 1951 showed that on the western side of the church were two towers without doors. The church was at first built out of bricks, then in the 12th century with a combination of bricks and cut stone. Finally, two centuries later, it was rebuilt with processed pieces of sandstone. On the outside, it was decorated with stone sculptures of natural scenes. South of the church were monastic quarters and a welt.

== Art ==
Today the church is ruined, and no art remains inside. However, as stated above, Austrian painter and travelling writer Felix Kanitz recorded the richness of the beautiful frescoes inside.
