= Church of the Holy Mother of God, Darashamb =

Church in East Azerbaijan, Iran

Church of the Holy Mother of God Սուրբ Ասսուածածին Եկեղեցի
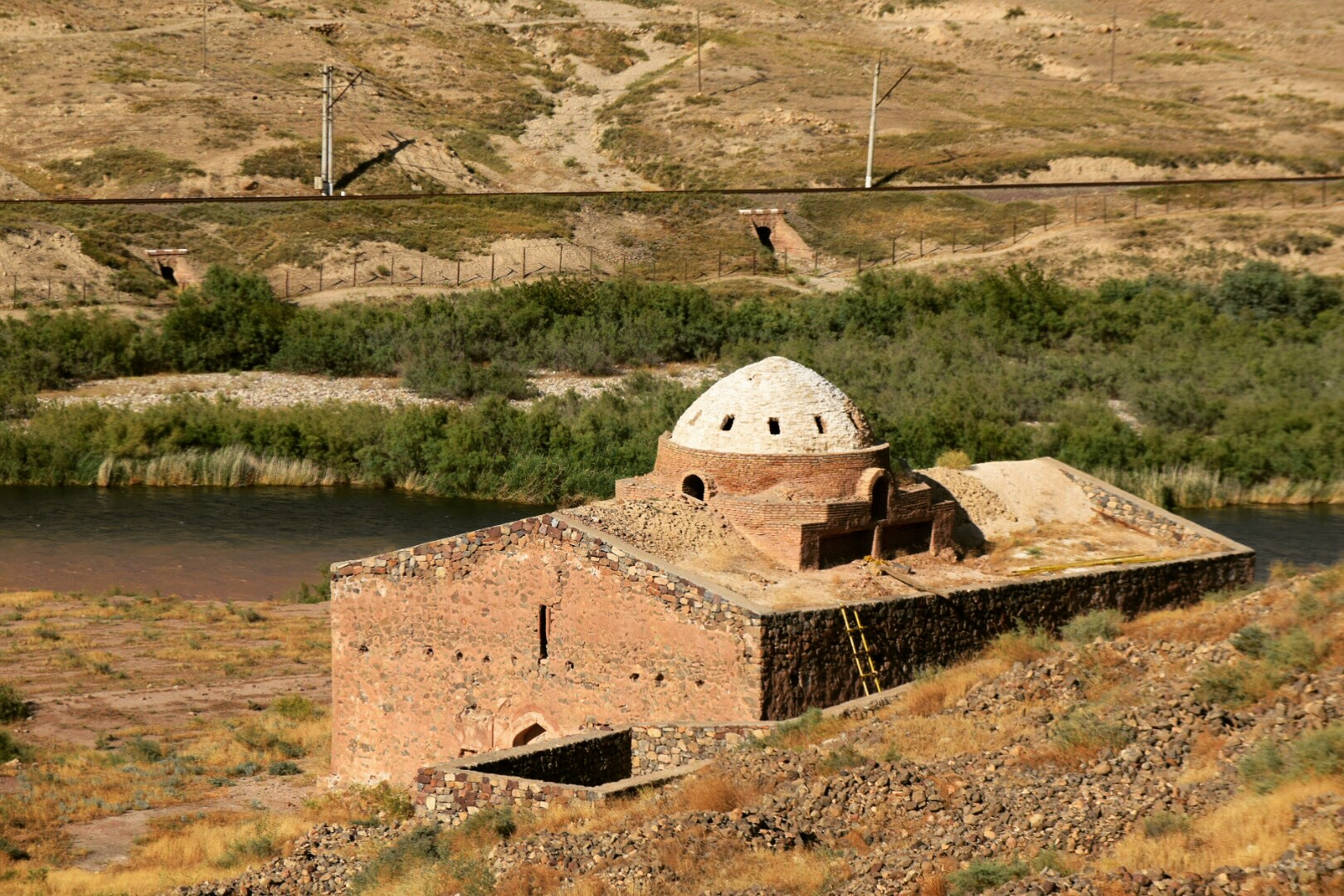
- Church of the Holy Mother of God along the Araks River

- Location within Iran

Religion
- Affiliation: Armenian Apostolic Church

Location
- Location: Jolfa, East Azarbaijan Province, Iran
- Coordinates: 38°58′45.75″N 45°28′23.71″E

Architecture
- Type: Church
- Groundbreaking: 17th century
- UNESCO World Heritage Site
- Type: Cultural
- Criteria: ii, iii, vi
- Designated: 2008 (32nd session)
- Reference no.: 1262
- Region: Asia-Pacific

The Church of Saint Astvatsatsin or Church of the Holy Mother of God (Armenian: Սուրբ Ասսուածածին Եկեղեցի, Persian: کلیسای مریم‌مقدس دره‌شام) is a 17th-century Armenian church in the Valley of the Araxes along the Aras river in Jolfa, East Azerbaijan, Iran, near Darashamb.

== See also ==
- Saint Stepanos Monastery, an Armenian monastery about 2 kilometers southeast.
- Julfa Armenian cemetery, an early modern Armenian cemetery 10 kilometers east, in the Nakhchivan region of the republic of Azerbaijan.

== Gallery ==
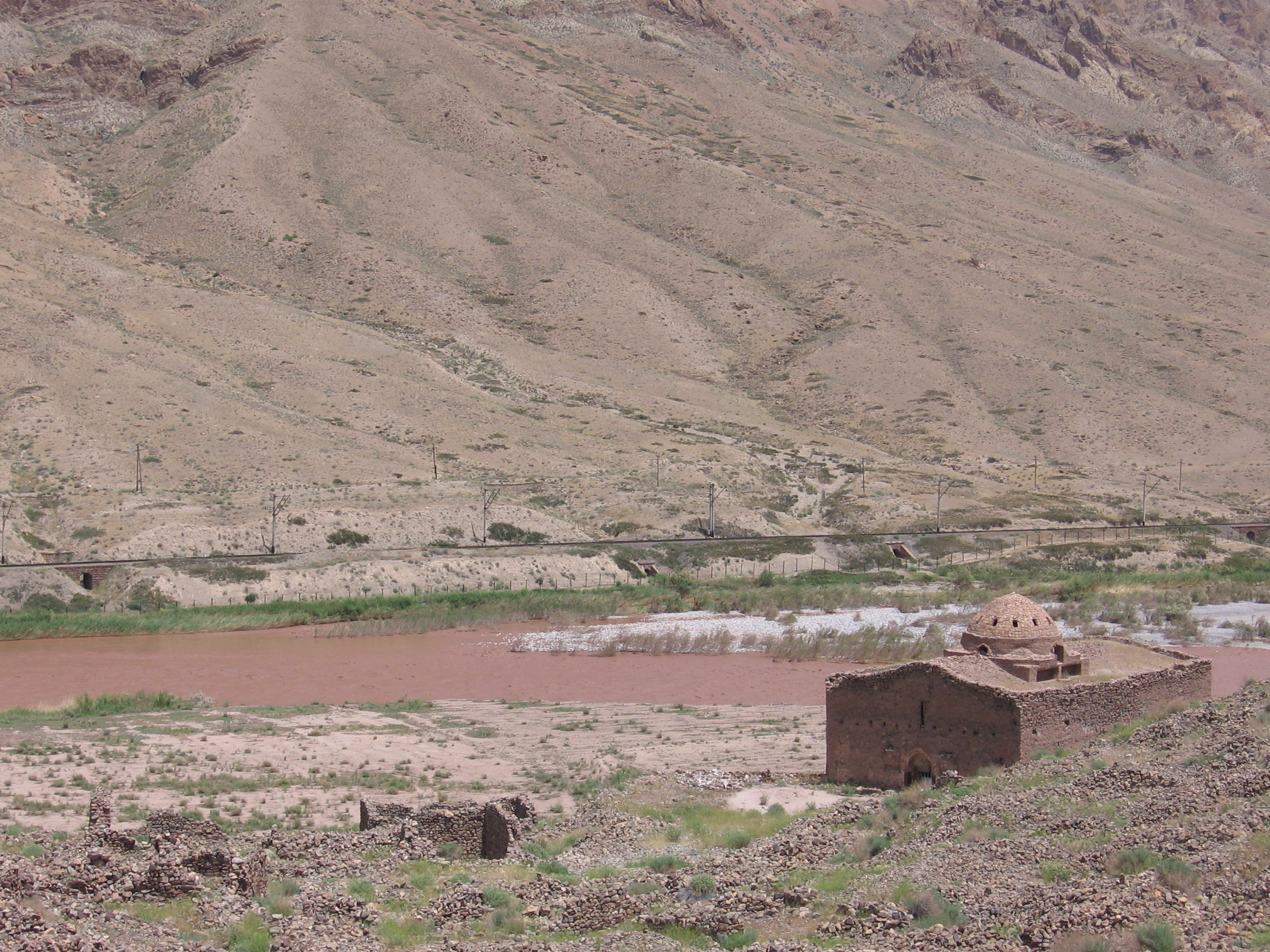
The church and the Araxes.

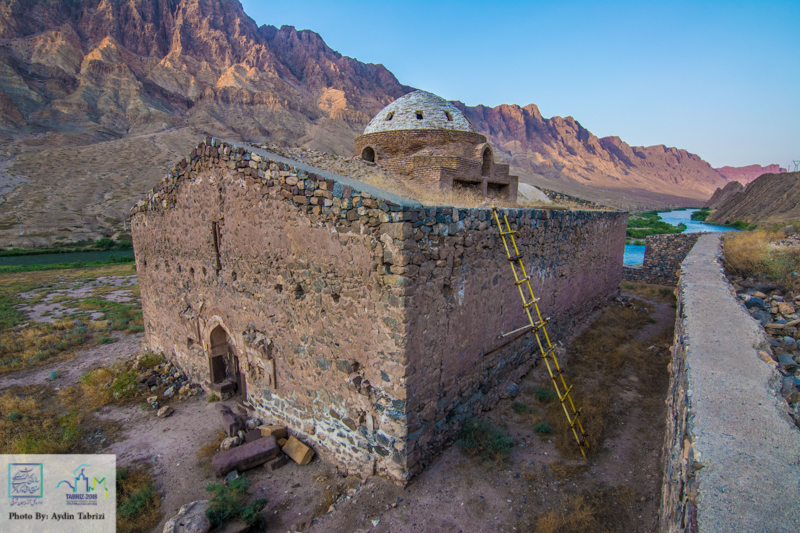
The church building.
