= Selačka =

Selačka Селачка
- Village
- Location within Serbia
- Coordinates: 43°41′N 22°19′E
- Country: Serbia
- District: Zaječar District
- Municipality: Zaječar

Population (2002)
  - Total: 275
- Time zone: UTC+1 (CET)
  - Summer (DST): UTC+2 (CEST)

Selačka (Serbian Cyrillic: Селачка) is a village in the municipality of Zaječar, Serbia. According to the 2002 census, the village has a population of 275 people.
