= Church of the Holy Mother of God, Panagyurishte =

Church in Pazardzhik, Bulgaria

Coordinates: 42°30′15.75″N 24°11′26.46″E

A view of the church

The Church of the Holy Mother of God (Bulgarian: Църква Света Богородица) is a Bulgarian National Revival church in the town of Panagyurishte, Pazardzhik Province. It is situated in the central part of the town separated from the central square by the Town Hall and the Chitalishte Videlina. In the same yards was located the Church of St Theodore which was Panagyurishte's oldest church.

St Theodore was constructed in the mid 16th century and used to be a small one nave edifice which is now connected with the larger new church. During the uncertain first decade of the 19th century it was destroyed by Ottoman bandits called kardzhalii and restored between 1808 and 1809 by orders of the Bishop of Plovdiv Dionisius.

The construction of the Church of the Holy Mother of God started in 1818 near the southern wall of the old building and was finished in 1823. It was one nave basilica with a colonnade and was much larger than the old church. It was inaugurated by Dionisius as well. The edifice was constructed by craftsmen from Bratsigovo while the interior was decorated by painters from the famous Samokov school. The interior was badly damaged when the Ottomans burned Panagyurishte during the April Uprising in 1876. It was restored between 1878 and 1880 after the Liberation of Bulgaria.

In 2003 the church was renovated and the domes were covered with golden plates.
