= Zoravor Surp Astvatsatsin Church =

Church in Yerevan, Armenia

Zoravor Surp Astvatsatsin Church Զորավոր Սուրբ Աստվածածին եկեղեցի
- Zoravor Surp Astvatsatsin Church

- Location within Armenia

Religion
- Affiliation: Armenian Apostolic Church
- District: Kentron District
- Region: Yerevan
- Ecclesiastical or organisational status: Church
- Status: Active

Location
- Location: in a courtyard north of Pushkin and Ghazar Parpetsi Streets, Kentron Yerevan, Armenia
- Territory: Armenia
- Coordinates: 40.186079°N 44.509606°E

Architecture
- Type: Three-nave basilica without dome
- Style: Armenian
- Completed: 1694

Website
- Official website

Zoravor Surp Astvatsatsin Church (Armenian: Զորավոր Սուրբ Աստվածածին եկեղեցի (Zoravor Surp Astvatsatsin yekeghets'i)) is the second oldest surviving church in Yerevan. It was previously known as Surp Astvatsatsin (Holy Mother of God). However, the name Zoravor (meaning Powerful) was added because the church was home to the 13th century bible of Zoravor.

The church is located in the Shahar District of Old Yerevan where the tomb and the Chapel of Ananias the Apostle were previously located. This chapel was looked upon as a famous sanctuary.

== History ==
During the 1st half of the 17th century, monk Movses Syunetsi built a monastery complex with the financial support of the residents of Yerevan. The complex was made up of the Surp Astvatsatsin church, the chapel of Saint Anania, as well as of chambers for the members of the congregation and the prelacy building, all enclosed with fortified walls. A monastic school was opened within the complex as well. The construction of the monastery took place during the reign of Philip I of Armenia (Pilipos), the Catholicos (1632–1635). However, the newly built monastery did not last long. It was completely destroyed by the earthquake of 1679.

Present-day Surp Zoravor Astvatsatsin Church was built in 1693–94, on the same site of the ruined monastery, thanks to the donation of Khoja Panos who was one of the wealthiest residents of Yerevan. According to an inscription recorded 100 years after its construction, the church was renovated by Gabriel Haryurapet during the reign of Catholicos Luke I.

The church is of three-nave basilica type without dome. On the eastern side of the prayer hall is the main altar with vestries at the northern and southern corners. Architecturally, the interior and exterior features of the church are characterized by a striking simplicity. To a certain extent the three-vaulted porch in the western part of the church with decorative columns provides a substantial liveliness. On the flat parts of the external walls, there are beautifully carved khachkars (cross-stones) dating back to the 17th century.

In 1889, the Saint Ananias' Chapel was constructed on the northeastern side of the church, with stairs leading to the graveyard of Saint Ananias on its eastern flank.

After serving for different purposes throughout the years of the Soviet rule, Surp Zoravor Astvatsatsin Church was finally returned to the Mother See of the Armenian Apostolic Church during the 1970s, when it was entirely renovated. The decayed and falling parts of the walls and roofs were repaired and restored, a choir was added, and a new house was built for the priests. Saint Ananias' Chapel was also renovated.

== Gallery ==
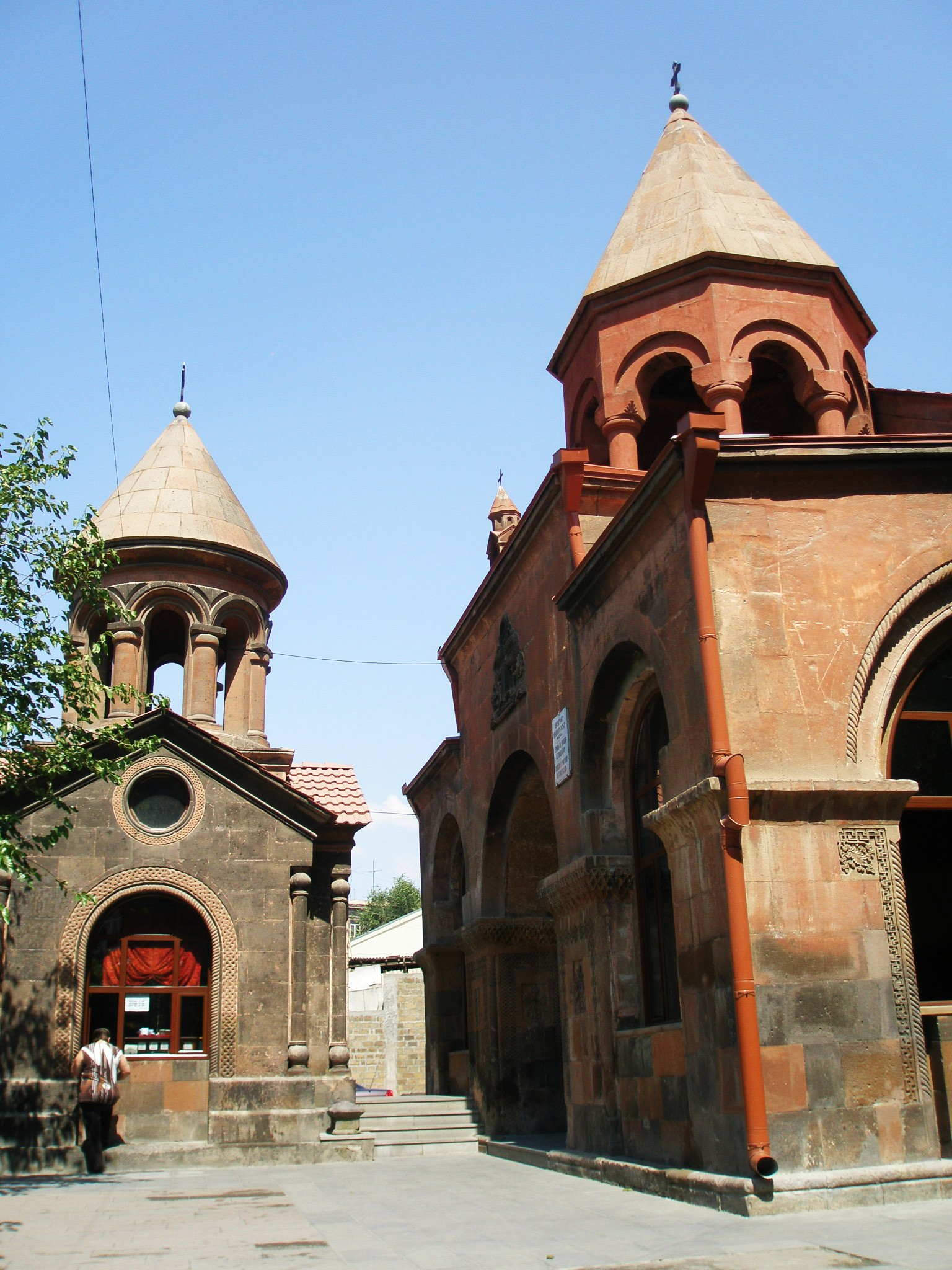
S. Zoravor Astvatsatsin Church and the chapel of Saint Anania

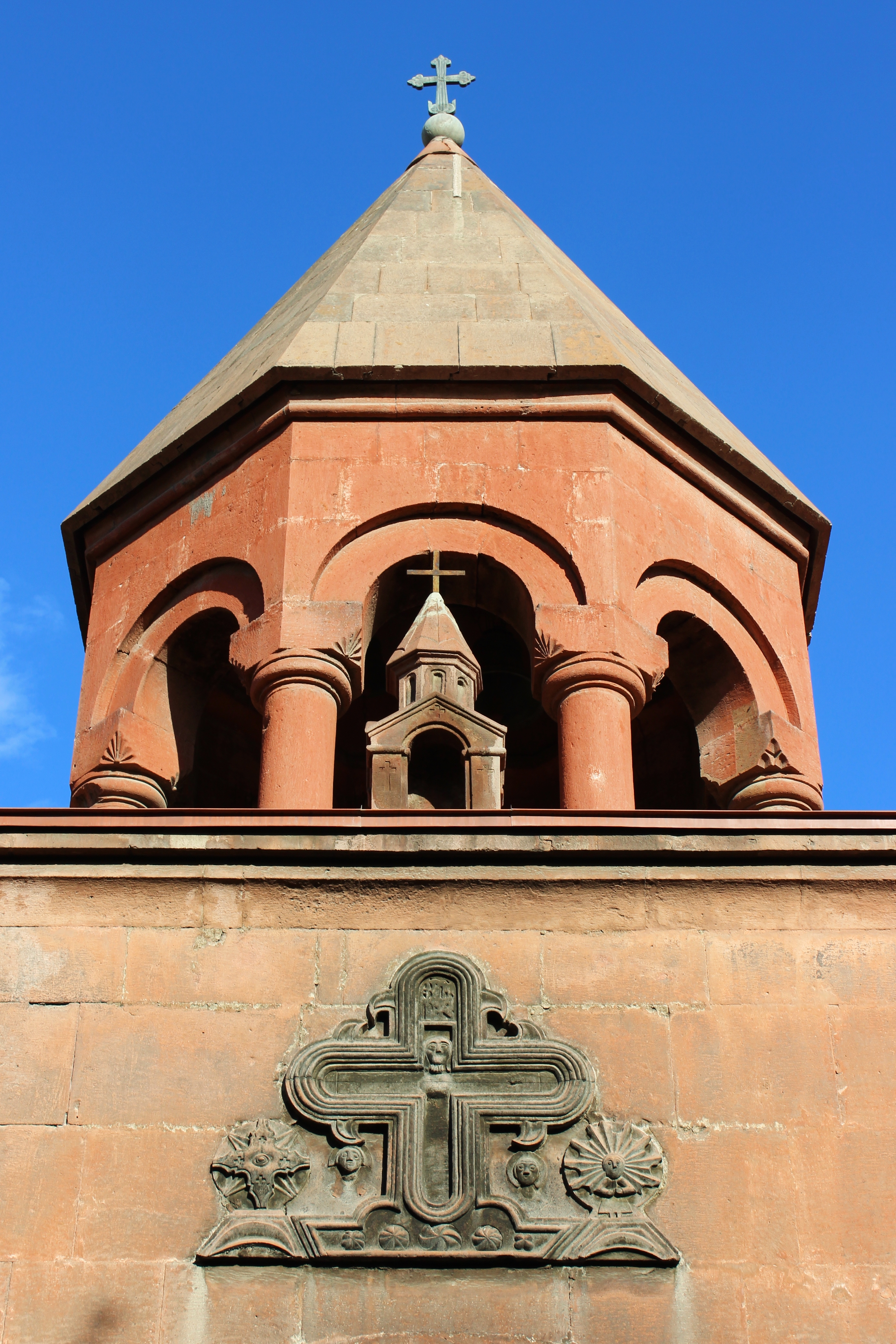
The belfry at the main entrance

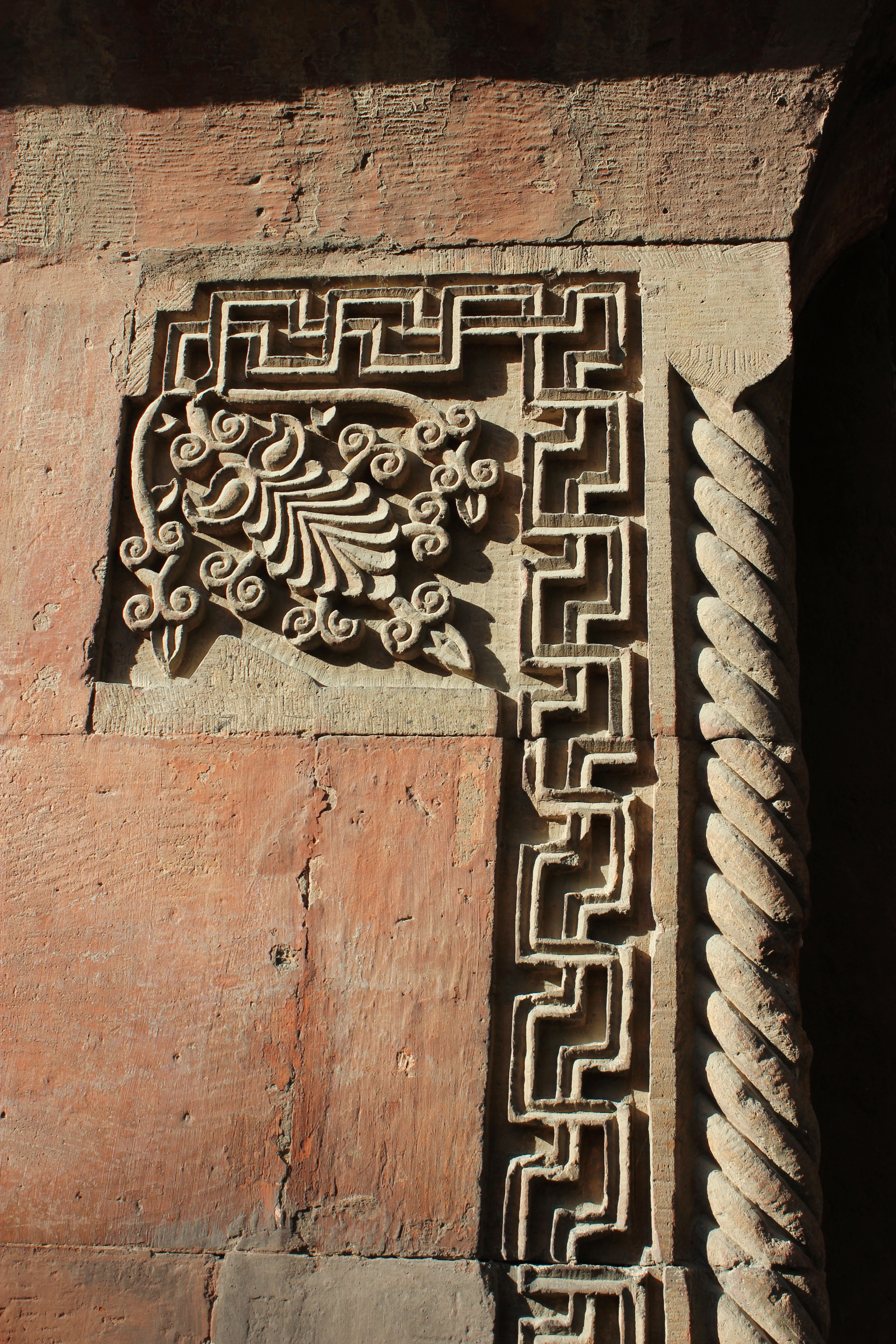
Detail of the church's exterior

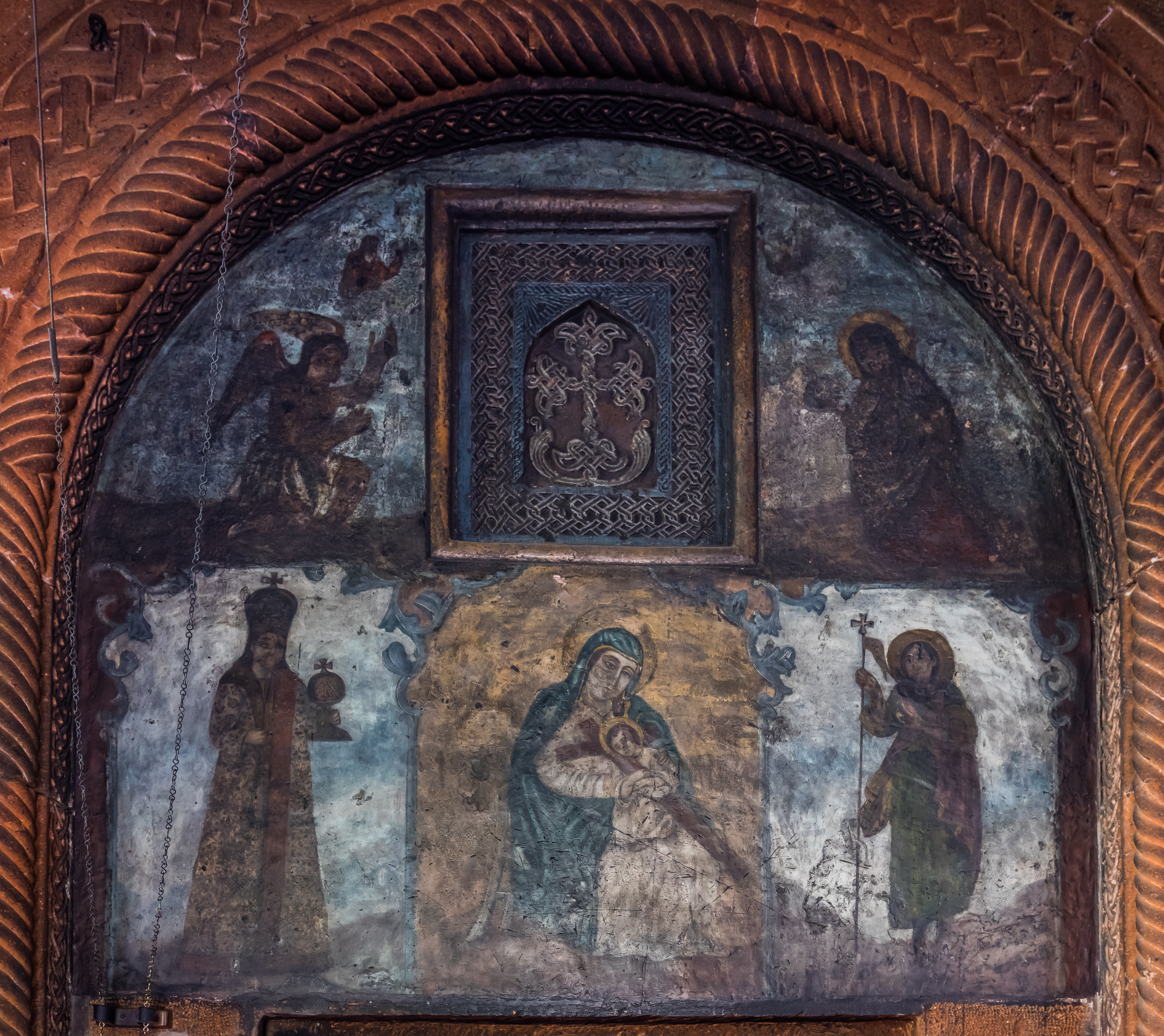
Tympanum with fresco depicting the Virgin Mary and saints

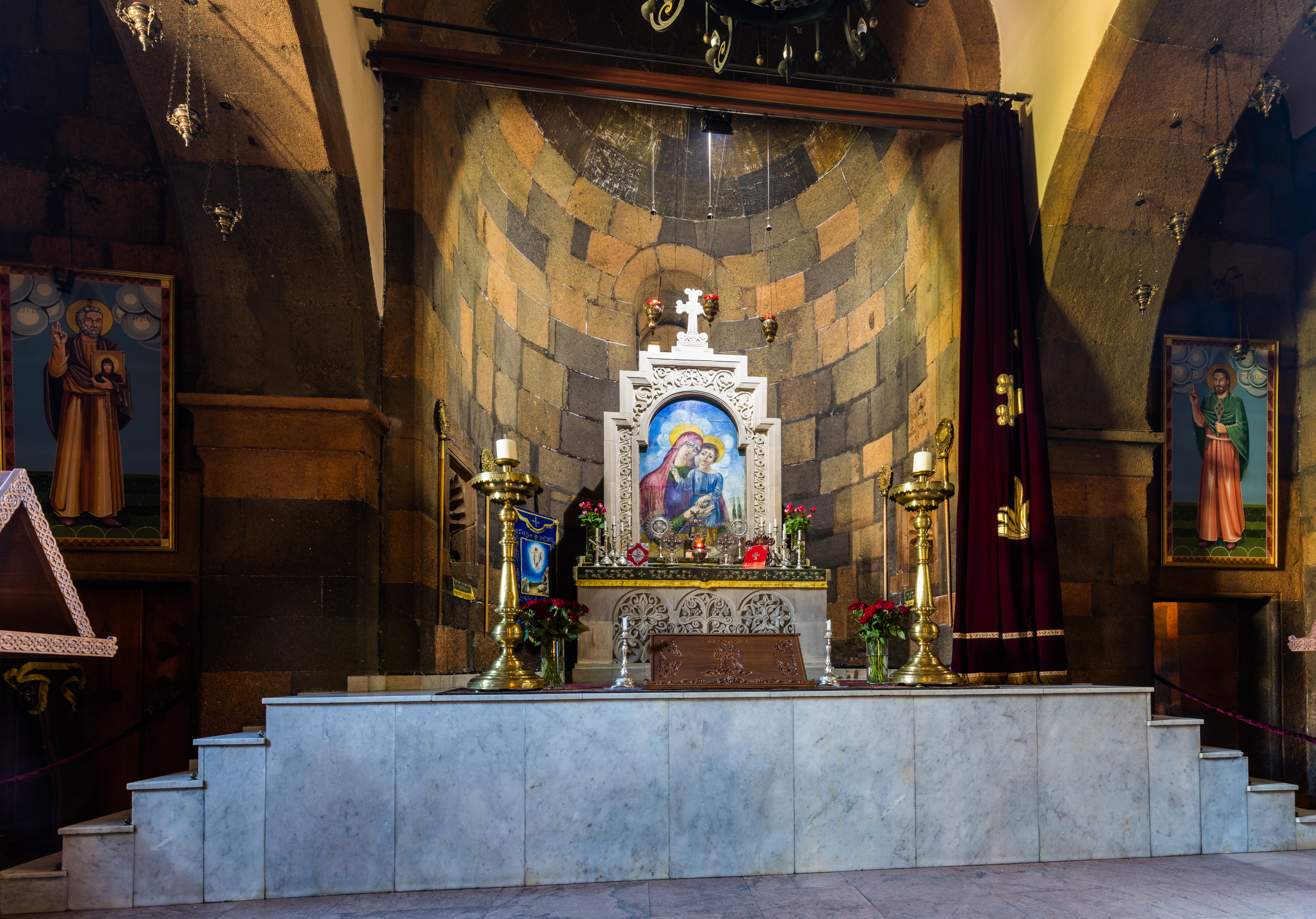
The main altar

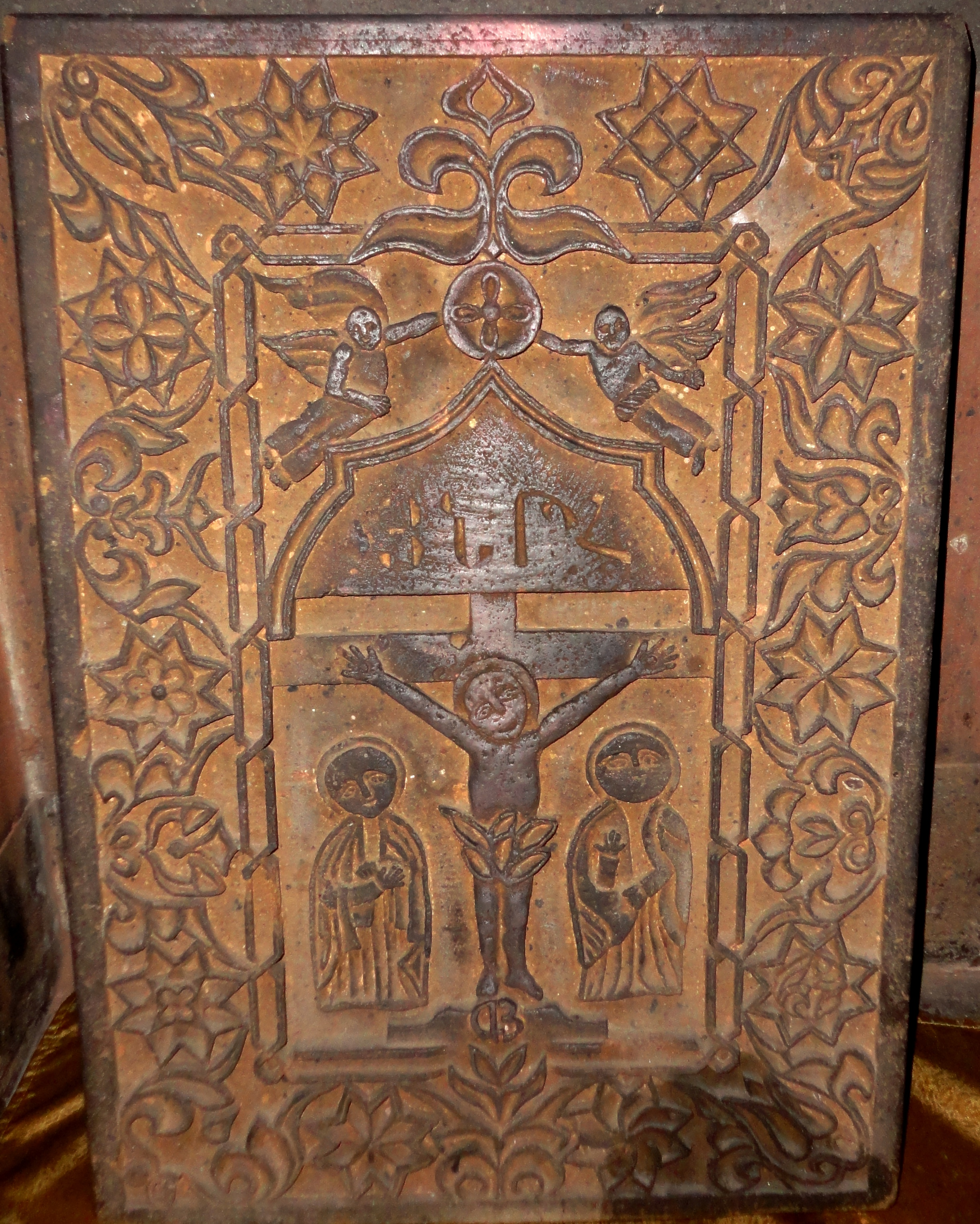
Khachkar in the prayer sanctuary

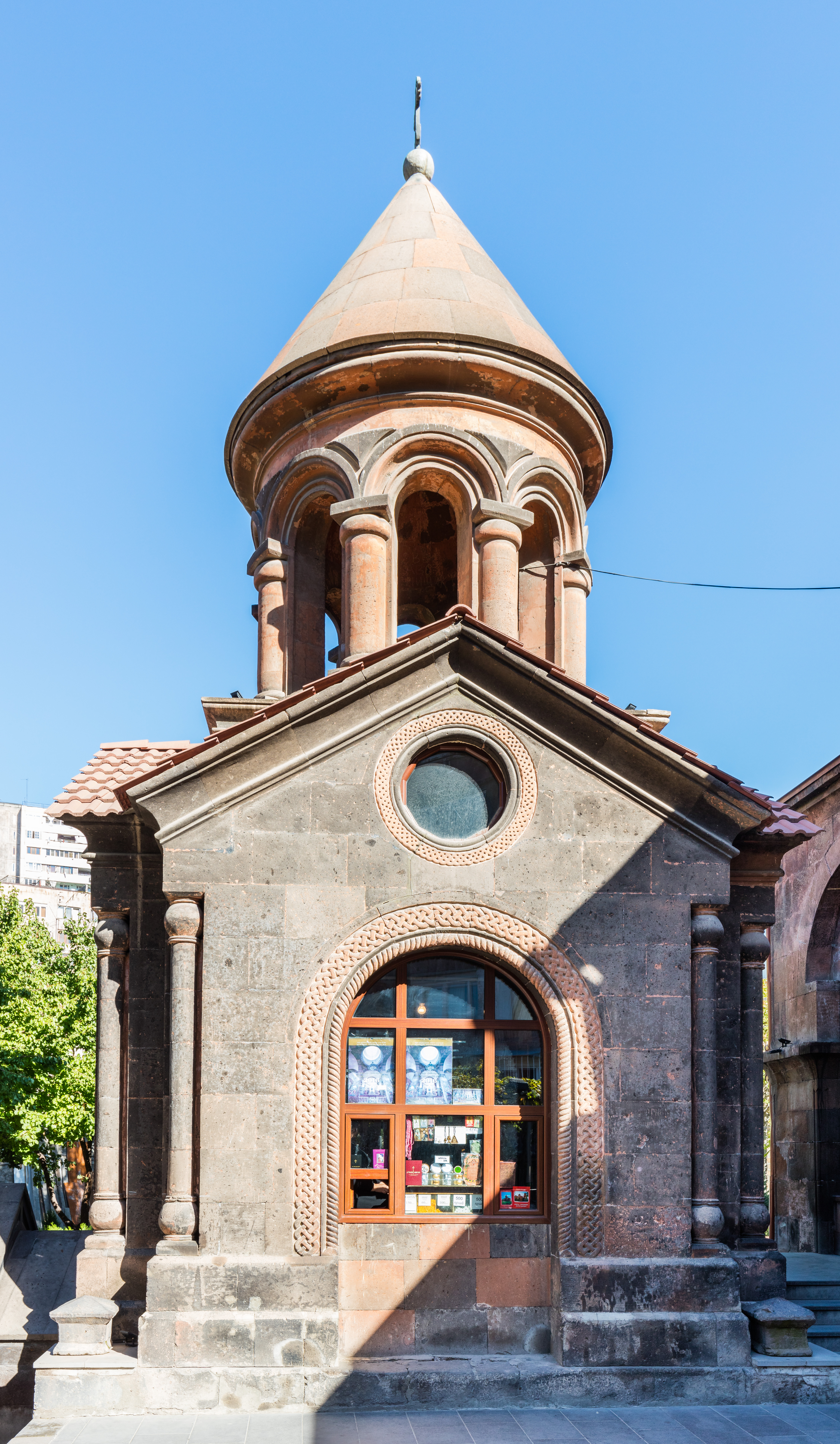
Saint Ananias' chapel

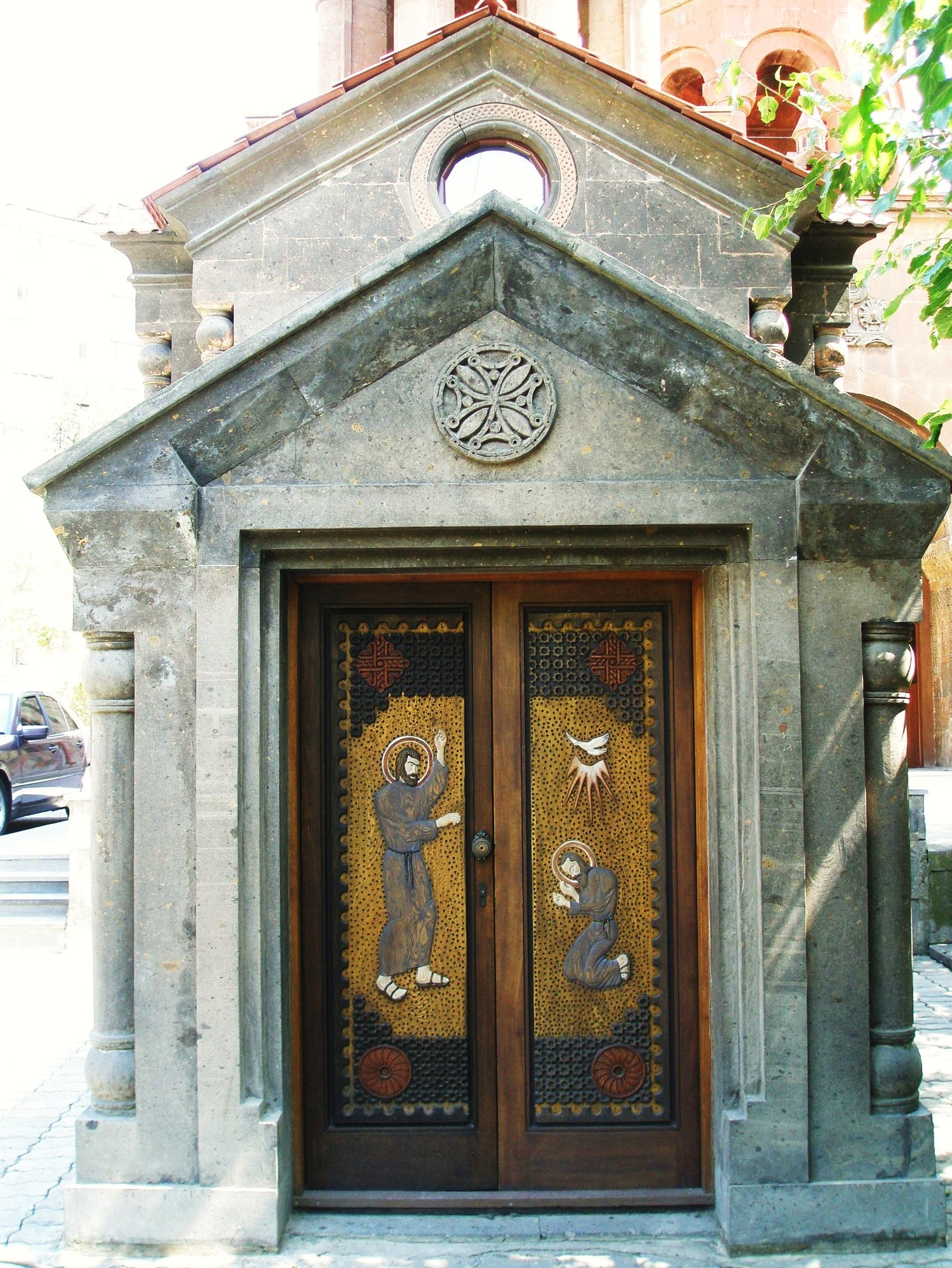
Doors leading to the Chapel of Saint Ananias' below the belfry

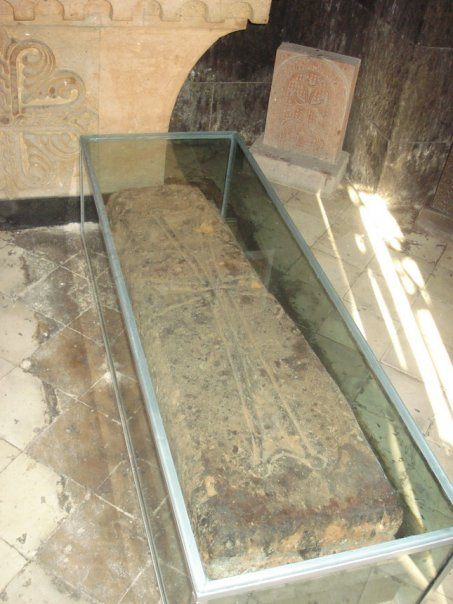
Saint Ananias' tombstone
