= Shoja =

Shoja (Persian: شجاع) may refer to:

- Shoja, East Azerbaijan
- Shoja, Kermanshah
- Shoja Rural District, in East Azerbaijan Province
