= Erzsi =

Erzsi is the short version of Erzsébet, the Hungarian form of the given name Elizabeth.

Notable people with the (nick)name Erzsi include:

- Erzsi Ferenczy (c. 1904 – 2000), wife of Hungarian painter Béni Ferenczy
- Erzsi Kovács DRH (1928–2014), Hungarian pop singer and performer
- Erzsi Paál (1912–1973), Hungarian film and stage actress
- Erzsi Pártos (1907–2000), Hungarian film actress
- Erzsi Pásztor (born 1936), Hungarian film actress
- Erzsi Simor (1913–1977), Hungarian film actress
- Erzsi Somogyi (1906–1973), Hungarian film and stage actress

== See also ==
- Elizabeth (disambiguation)
- Ersi (disambiguation)
- Erzi (disambiguation)
