= Taleb Goli =

Taleb Goli طالب گلي
- Village
- Location within Iran
- Coordinates: 38°49′37″N 45°35′28″E
- Country: Iran
- Province: East Azerbaijan
- County: Jolfa
- Bakhsh: Central
- Rural District: Shoja

Population (2006)
  - Total: 17
- Time zone: UTC+3:30 (IRST)
  - Summer (DST): UTC+4:30 (IRDT)

Taleb Goli (Persian: طالب گلي, also Romanized as Ţāleb Golī) is a village in Shoja Rural District, in the Central District of Jolfa County, East Azerbaijan Province, Iran. At the 2006 census, its population was 17, in 8 families.
