= Ahmadabad, Jolfa =

Village in East Azerbaijan province, Iran

Ahmadabad Persian: احمداباد
- Village
- Location within Iran
- Coordinates: 38°53′20″N 45°51′50″E
- Country: Iran
- Province: East Azerbaijan
- County: Jolfa
- District: Central
- Rural District: Daran

Population (2016)
  - Total: 131
- Time zone: UTC+3:30 (IRST)

Ahmadabad (Persian: احمداباد) (Note: Also romanized as Aḩmadābād) is a village in Daran Rural District of the Central District in Jolfa County, East Azerbaijan province, Iran.

== Demographics ==
=== Population ===
At the time of the 2006 National Census, the village's population was 80 in 25 households. The following census in 2011 counted 108 people in 37 households. The 2016 census measured the population of the village as 131 people in 47 households.
