= Qarah Bolagh, Jolfa =

Village in East Azerbaijan province, Iran

Qarah Bolagh Persian: قره بلاغ
- Village
- Location within Iran
- Coordinates: 38°47′07″N 45°29′20″E
- Country: Iran
- Province: East Azerbaijan
- County: Jolfa
- District: Central
- Rural District: Shoja

Population (2016)
  - Total: 469
- Time zone: UTC+3:30 (IRST)

Qarah Bolagh (Persian: قره بلاغ) (Note: Also romanized as Qarah Bolāgh; also known as Qal‘eh Zīr (قلعه زير)) is a village in Shoja Rural District of the Central District in Jolfa County, East Azerbaijan province, Iran.

== Demographics ==
=== Population ===
At the time of the 2006 National Census, the village's population was 467 in 125 households. The following census in 2011 counted 394 people in 117 households. The 2016 census measured the population of the village as 469 people in 159 households.
