= Darana =

Darana (Persian: دارانا) may refer to:

- Darana, Jolfa
- Darana, Khoda Afarin
