= Afshar, Jolfa =

Village in East Azerbaijan province, Iran

Afshar Persian: افشار
- Village
- Location within Iran
- Coordinates: 38°50′59″N 45°49′11″E
- Country: Iran
- Province: East Azerbaijan
- County: Jolfa
- District: Central
- Rural District: Daran

Population (2016)
  - Total: 167
- Time zone: UTC+3:30 (IRST)

Afshar (Persian: افشار) (Note: Also romanized as Afshār; also known as Afshāi and Avshār) is a village in Daran Rural District of the Central District in Jolfa County, East Azerbaijan province, Iran.

== Demographics ==
=== Population ===
At the time of the 2006 National Census, the village's population was 231 in 100 households. The following census in 2011 counted 175 people in 84 households. The 2016 census measured the population of the village as 167 people in 86 households.
