= Qeshlaq, Jolfa =

Village in East Azerbaijan province, Iran

Qeshlaq Persian: قشلاق
- Village
- Location within Iran
- Coordinates: 38°46′07″N 45°46′49″E
- Country: Iran
- Province: East Azerbaijan
- County: Jolfa
- District: Central
- Rural District: Ersi

Population (2016)
  - Total: 268
- Time zone: UTC+3:30 (IRST)

Qeshlaq (Persian: قشلاق) (Note: Also romanized as Qeshlāq) is a village in Ersi Rural District of the Central District in Jolfa County, East Azerbaijan province, Iran.

== Demographics ==
=== Population ===
At the time of the 2006 National Census, the village's population was 674 in 187 households. The following census in 2011 counted 375 people in 123 households. The 2016 census measured the population of the village as 268 people in 103 households.
