= Jolfa, Iran =

City in East Azerbaijan province, Iran

Jolfa Persian: جلفا
- City
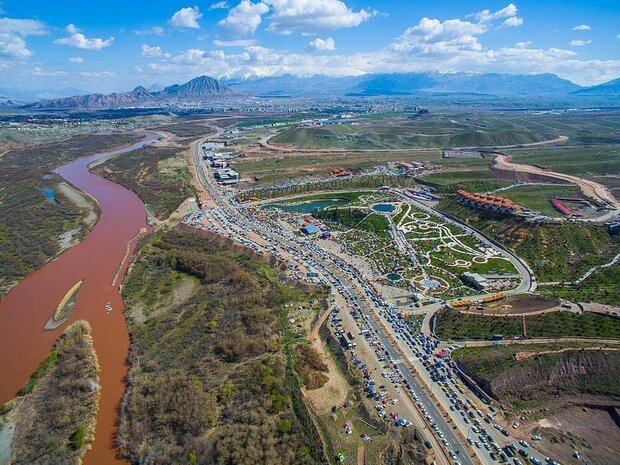
- A view of the road near Jolfa city along the Aras River

- Location within Iran
- Coordinates: 38°56′19″N 45°37′31″E
- Country: Iran
- Province: East Azerbaijan
- County: Jolfa
- District: Central
- Elevation: 710 m (2,330 ft)

Population (2016)
  - Total: 8,810
- Time zone: UTC+3:30 (IRST)

Jolfa (Persian: جلفا) (Note: Also romanized as Jolfā; also known as Dzhulfi and Julfa) is a city in the Central District of Jolfa County, East Azerbaijan province, Iran, serving as capital of both the county and the district. Jolfa is separated by the Aras River from its namesake, the town of Julfa on the Azerbaijan side of the border. The two towns are linked by a road bridge and a railway bridge.

== Demographics ==
=== Population ===
At the 2006 National Census, the city's population was 4,983 in 1,365 households. The following census in 2011 counted 5,628 people in 1,448 households. At the 2016 census, the population was 8,810 people in 2,543 households.

== Climate ==
Jolfa has a cold desert climate (BWk) according to the Köppen climate classification.

Climate data for Jolfa (1985-2010 normals)
Month	Jan	Feb	Mar	Apr	May	Jun	Jul	Aug	Sep	Oct	Nov	Dec	Year
Mean daily maximum °C (°F)	3.2 (37.8)	7.6 (45.7)	14.3 (57.7)	21.2 (70.2)	26.6 (79.9)	32.3 (90.1)	34.9 (94.8)	35.0 (95.0)	30.5 (86.9)	23.0 (73.4)	14.3 (57.7)	6.6 (43.9)	20.8 (69.4)
Daily mean °C (°F)	−1.1 (30.0)	2.7 (36.9)	8.4 (47.1)	14.9 (58.8)	19.9 (67.8)	25.6 (78.1)	29.0 (84.2)	28.8 (83.8)	23.7 (74.7)	16.6 (61.9)	8.8 (47.8)	2.3 (36.1)	15.0 (58.9)
Mean daily minimum °C (°F)	−5.3 (22.5)	−2.2 (28.0)	2.4 (36.3)	8.6 (47.5)	13.2 (55.8)	18.9 (66.0)	23.0 (73.4)	22.6 (72.7)	16.9 (62.4)	10.1 (50.2)	3.2 (37.8)	−2.0 (28.4)	9.1 (48.4)
Average precipitation mm (inches)	9.0 (0.35)	11.4 (0.45)	22.4 (0.88)	36.0 (1.42)	37.0 (1.46)	21.5 (0.85)	7.6 (0.30)	4.2 (0.17)	9.7 (0.38)	17.9 (0.70)	17.1 (0.67)	12.4 (0.49)	206.2 (8.12)
Average relative humidity (%)	73	65	57	54	51	42	38	38	45	55	66	73	55
Average dew point °C (°F)	−5.6 (21.9)	−4.6 (23.7)	−1.3 (29.7)	4.3 (39.7)	8.0 (46.4)	10.4 (50.7)	12.2 (54.0)	12.5 (54.5)	9.4 (48.9)	5.9 (42.6)	1.8 (35.2)	−2.8 (27.0)	4.2 (39.5)
Source: IRIMO(precipitation) (temperatures) (humidity) (dew point 1985-2005)

== Historical monuments ==
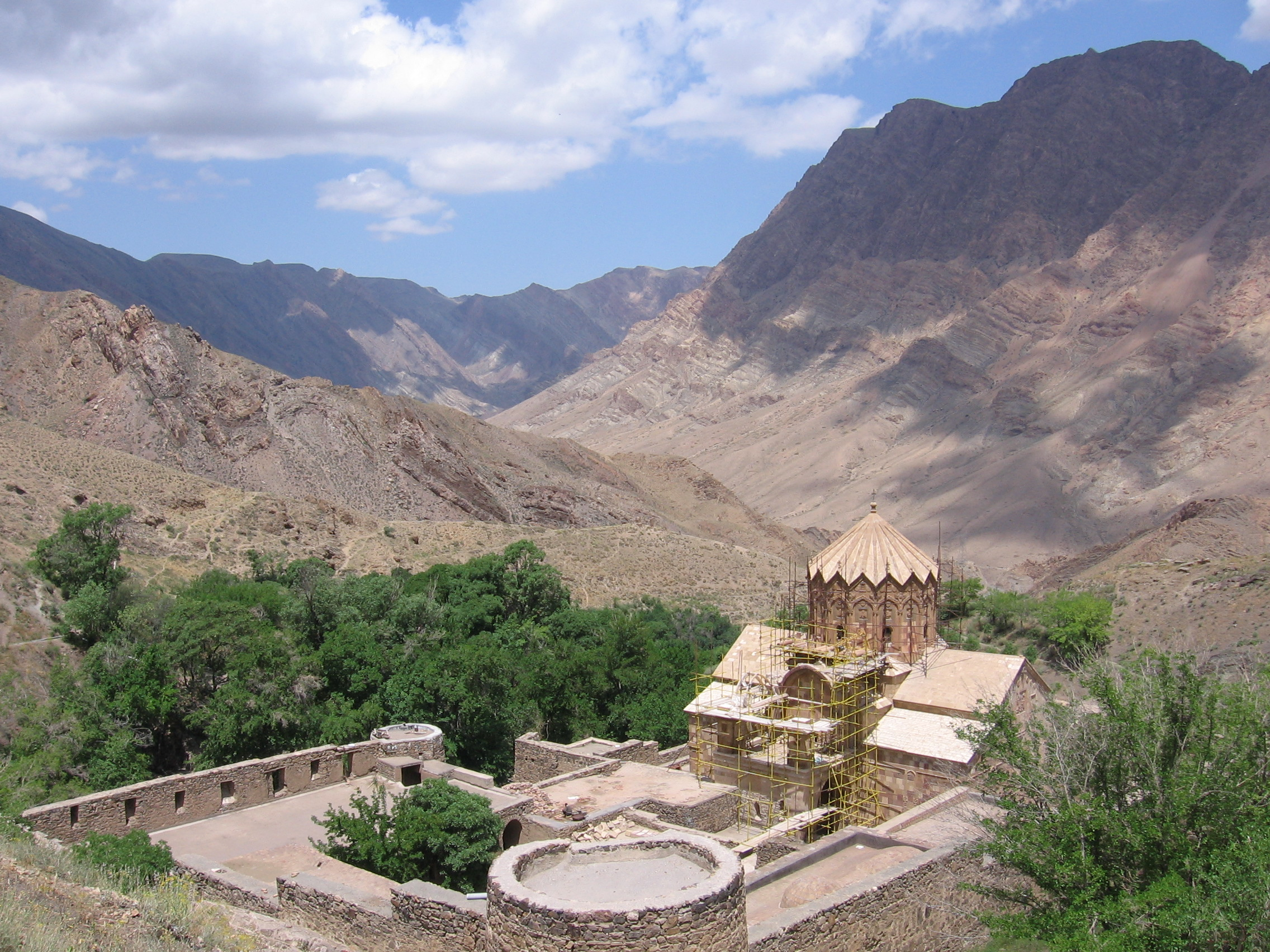
Saint Stepanos Monastery near Jolfa

- Saint Stepanos Monastery
- Jolfa Water Mill
- Chapel of Chupan
