= Alvan, East Azerbaijan =

Village in East Azerbaijan province, Iran

Alvan Persian: الوان
- Village
- Location within Iran
- Coordinates: 38°48′53″N 45°54′31″E
- Country: Iran
- Province: East Azerbaijan
- County: Jolfa
- District: Central
- Rural District: Daran

Population (2016)
  - Total: 63
- Time zone: UTC+3:30 (IRST)

Alvan (Persian: الوان) (Note: Also romanized as Alvān) is a village in Daran Rural District of the Central District in Jolfa County, East Azerbaijan province, Iran.

== Demographics ==
=== Population ===
At the time of the 2006 National Census, the village's population was 74 in 24 households. The following census in 2011 counted 63 people in 21 households. The 2016 census measured the population of the village as 63 people in 27 households.
