= Siah Saran =

Village in East Azerbaijan province, Iran

Siah Saran Persian: سيه سران
- Village
- Location within Iran
- Coordinates: 38°48′37″N 45°43′33″E
- Country: Iran
- Province: East Azerbaijan
- County: Jolfa
- District: Central
- Rural District: Ersi

Population (2016)
  - Total: 699
- Time zone: UTC+3:30 (IRST)

Siah Saran (Persian: سيه سران) (Note: Also romanized as Sīah Sarān) is a village in Ersi Rural District of the Central District in Jolfa County, East Azerbaijan province, Iran.

== Demographics ==
=== Population ===
At the time of the 2006 National Census, the village's population was 983 in 315 households. The following census in 2011 counted 775 people in 281 households. The 2016 census measured the population of the village as 699 people in 269 households.
