= Zaviyeh, Jolfa =

Village in East Azerbaijan province, Iran

Zaviyeh Persian: زاويه
- Village
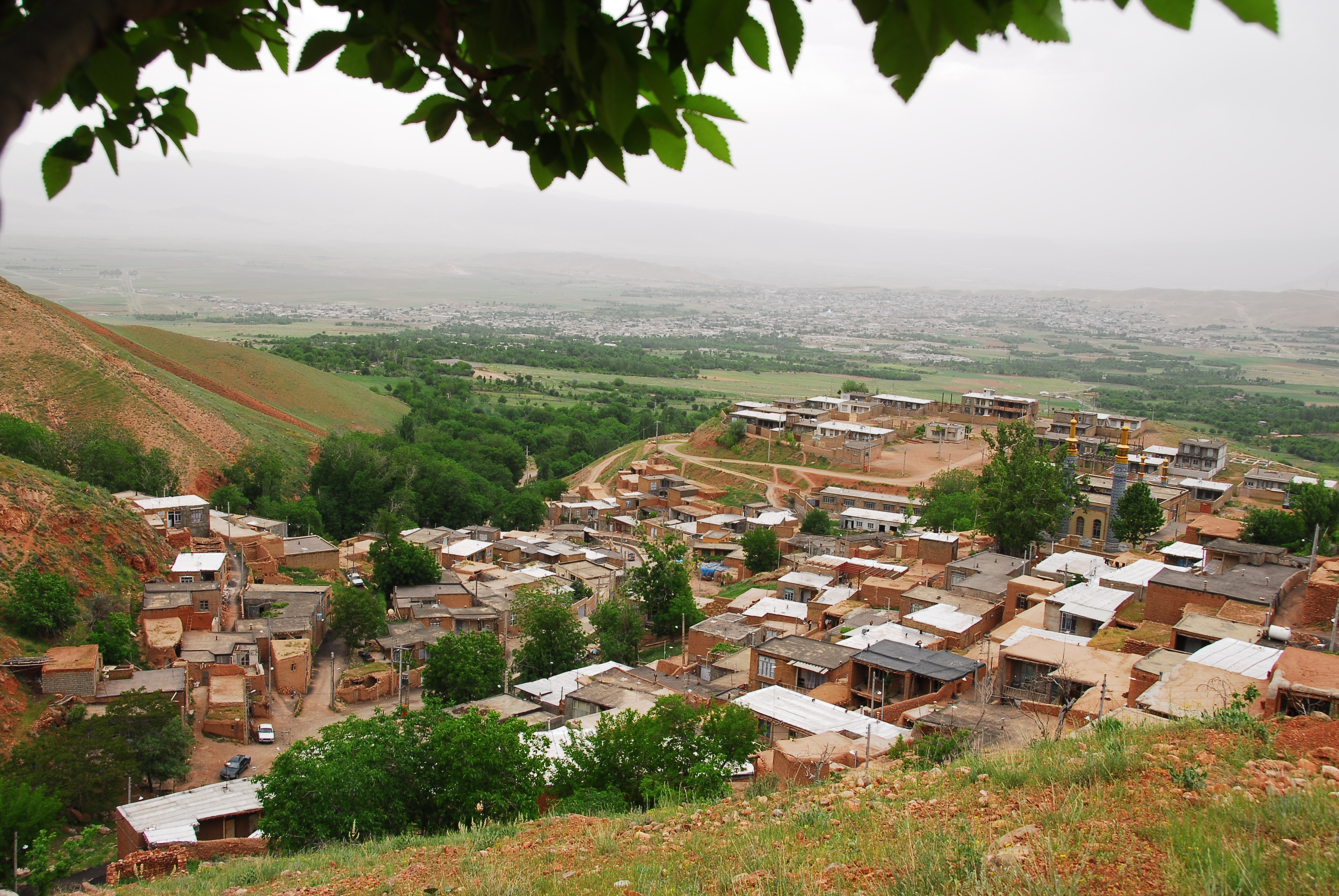
- The village of Zaviyeh

- Location within Iran
- Coordinates: 38°48′25″N 45°41′05″E
- Country: Iran
- Province: East Azerbaijan
- County: Jolfa
- District: Central
- Rural District: Ersi

Population (2016)
  - Total: 520
- Time zone: UTC+3:30 (IRST)

Zaviyeh (Persian: زاويه) (Note: Also romanized as Zāvīyeh) is a village in Ersi Rural District of the Central District in Jolfa County, East Azerbaijan province, Iran.

== Demographics ==
=== Population ===
At the time of the 2006 National Census, the village's population was 479 in 143 households. The following census in 2011 counted 519 people in 157 households. The 2016 census measured the population of the village as 520 people in 171 households.
