= Marazad =

Village in East Azerbaijan province, Iran

Marazad Persian: مرازاد
- Village
- Location within Iran
- Coordinates: 38°53′34″N 45°49′55″E
- Country: Iran
- Province: East Azerbaijan
- County: Jolfa
- District: Central
- Rural District: Daran

Population (2016)
  - Total: 310
- Time zone: UTC+3:30 (IRST)

Marazad (Persian: مرازاد) (Note: Also romanized as Marāzād; also known as Mārāzāt; also known in Azerbaijani Turkish as Ilanliaza (ایلانلی آزا)) is a village in Daran Rural District of the Central District in Jolfa County, East Azerbaijan province, Iran.

== Etymology ==
The native name of the village is Ilanliaza, comprising ilan (snake) and aza (the former name of the region).

== Demographics ==
=== Population ===
At the time of the 2006 National Census, the village's population was 233 in 86 households. The following census in 2011 counted 253 people in 104 households. The 2016 census measured the population of the village as 310 people in 129 households.
