= Silgerd =

Village in East Azerbaijan province, Iran

Silgerd Persian: سيلگرد
- Village
- Location within Iran
- Coordinates: 38°52′06″N 45°34′27″E
- Country: Iran
- Province: East Azerbaijan
- County: Jolfa
- District: Central
- Rural District: Shoja

Population (2016)
  - Total: 386
- Time zone: UTC+3:30 (IRST)

Silgerd (Persian: سيلگرد) (Note: Also romanized as Sīlgerd and Sīlgord; also known as Mīlgerd and Selgerd) is a village in Shoja Rural District of the Central District in Jolfa County, East Azerbaijan province, Iran.

== Demographics ==
=== Population ===
At the time of the 2006 National Census, the village's population was 345 in 102 households. The following census in 2011 counted 302 people in 94 households. The 2016 census measured the population of the village as 386 people in 118 households.
