= Ersi =

Ersi (Persian: ارسي) may refer to:

- Ersi, Jolfa, East Azerbaijan Province
- Ersi, Marand, East Azerbaijan Province
- Ersi, West Azerbaijan
- Ersi Rural District, in East Azerbaijan Province
