= Livarjan =

Village in East Azerbaijan province, Iran

Livarjan Persian: ليوارجان
- Village
- Location within Iran
- Coordinates: 38°48′55″N 45°43′17″E
- Country: Iran
- Province: East Azerbaijan
- County: Jolfa
- District: Central
- Rural District: Ersi

Population (2016)
  - Total: 1,900
- Time zone: UTC+3:30 (IRST)

Livarjan (Persian: ليوارجان) (Note: Also romanized as Līvārjān; also known as Līvār) is a village in Ersi Rural District of the Central District in Jolfa County, East Azerbaijan province, Iran.

== Demographics ==
=== Population ===
At the time of the 2006 National Census, the village's population was 1,519 in 426 households. The following census in 2011 counted 1,450 people in 457 households. The 2016 census measured the population of the village as 1,900 people in 652 households. It was the most populous village in its rural district.
