= Nowshiravan =

Nowshiravan (Persian: نوشيروان) may refer to:

- Nowshiravan, East Azerbaijan
- Nowshiravan, Kermanshah
