= Shoja, East Azerbaijan =

Village in East Azerbaijan province, Iran

Shoja Persian: شجاع
- Village
- Location within Iran
- Coordinates: 38°54′02″N 45°38′41″E
- Country: Iran
- Province: East Azerbaijan
- County: Jolfa
- District: Central
- Rural District: Shoja

Population (2016)
  - Total: 2,538
- Time zone: UTC+3:30 (IRST)

Shoja (Persian: شجاع) (Note: Also romanized as Shojā‘) is a village in, and the capital of, Shoja Rural District in the Central District of Jolfa County, East Azerbaijan province, Iran.

== Demographics ==
=== Population ===
At the time of the 2006 National Census, the village's population was 2,287 in 617 households. The following census in 2011 counted 2,297 people in 682 households. The 2016 census measured the population of the village as 2,538 people in 819 households. It was the most populous village in its rural district.
