= Haydar Hatemi =

Iranian artist (born 1945)

- Born: Haydar Hatemi; 1945 (age 80–81); Hadishahr, Imperial State of Iran
- Education: University of Tehran
- Known for: artist, painter, sculptor
- Spouse: Shamsi Shams (m. 1979)
- Patrons: Qatari Royal Family, Sabanci Collection

Haydar Hatemi (Persian: حیدر حاتمی, born 3 March 1945, in Hadishahr) is an Iranian artist whose work is based on blends of classical oriental styles such as miniature and tazhib, with some modern elements. His early studies in art started at Tabriz's Art Academy after finishing high school in Tabriz, Iran.

Hatemi is a graduate of the prestigious Fine Arts Academy of Tehran University. He moved to Turkey in 1983. He is one of the most significant artists of the Iranian diaspora. Furthermore, he has been working under the commission of the Qatari Royal family for the last decade.

== Biography ==
=== Early life ===
Hatemi, an ethnic Azerbaijani, started painting aged 14, while he was continuing with high school in Tabriz. His early studies in art started at Tabriz's Art Academy after finishing at Tabriz middle school, Iran. It was during this time there that he learned the tazhib technique from Master Abduhl Bageri and studied sculpture techniques from Master Ashot Babayan. He continued his art studies at the Art Academy of Tehran and was privileged to be trained under masters Hussain Behzad and Abu Talib Mugimi.

=== Pahlavi era ===
Hatemi soon gained celebrity status during his sophomore year in college when he won the national award for designing the Takht-e-Tavus medal for the international Cancer Society. This award was presented to him by the Queen of Iran, Farah Pahlavi. Hatemi also taught sculpture classes in Shahnaz Pahlavi Art Academy.

During his college years in Tehran University, Hatemi won first place in multiple competitions which included design of the Logo of the Isfahan University and the Logo of the Shahpur Petro-Chemicals. He also designed the gold coins in commemoration of the 2500th anniversary of the Persian Empire.

Between 1972 and 1978, Hatemi established the Design Art Centre in Tehran and produced very large sculptures commissioned by the Mayor of Tehran. His statue of Shah Abbas on horseback is on display at Isfahan's Square and the statue Birds and the Rock at Argentina Square in Tehran.

=== After 1979 - Istanbul, Turkey ===
After the 1979 Iranian Revolution, Hatemi moved to Turkey with his young family in 1983. He continued his painting in Bursa and Istanbul and started the orientalist movement within the Turkish art world. During this period his paintings became part of the Sabancı Collection and many other private collections.

== Work ==
=== Paintings ===
Early in his career, Hatemi took great interest in the tazhib technique and miniature paintings in particular. His main goal to apply his style to the Ottoman theme was very well received by the Turkish art scene. His admiration for miniature masters and his desire to apply this to a newer subjects led to the creation of his "Stories of the Messengers" series in the early 2003 which became his most celebrated and famous series. In these series, Hatemi depicts stories of messengers which are common to Quran, Bible and Torah.

He also paints scenes of old Istanbul which was commissioned by the royal family of Qatar. Istanbul & Istanbul series are the best example for this technique.

== See also ==
- List of Iranian painters
