= Daran, East Azerbaijan =

Village in East Azerbaijan province, Iran

Daran Persian: داران
- Village
- Location within Iran
- Coordinates: 38°49′45″N 45°49′09″E
- Country: Iran
- Province: East Azerbaijan
- County: Jolfa
- District: Central
- Rural District: Daran

Population (2016)
  - Total: 900
- Time zone: UTC+3:30 (IRST)

Daran (Persian: داران) (Note: Also romanized as Dārān; also known as Dārānā) is a village in, and the capital of, Daran Rural District in the Central District of Jolfa County, East Azerbaijan province, Iran.

== Demographics ==
=== Population ===
At the time of the 2006 National Census, the village's population was 947 in 320 households. The following census in 2011 counted 934 people in 374 households. The 2016 census measured the population of the village as 900 people in 381 households. It was the most populous village in its rural district.
