= Chapel of Chupan =

Historic Armenian church in Iran

Chapel of Chupan Հովվի մատուռ
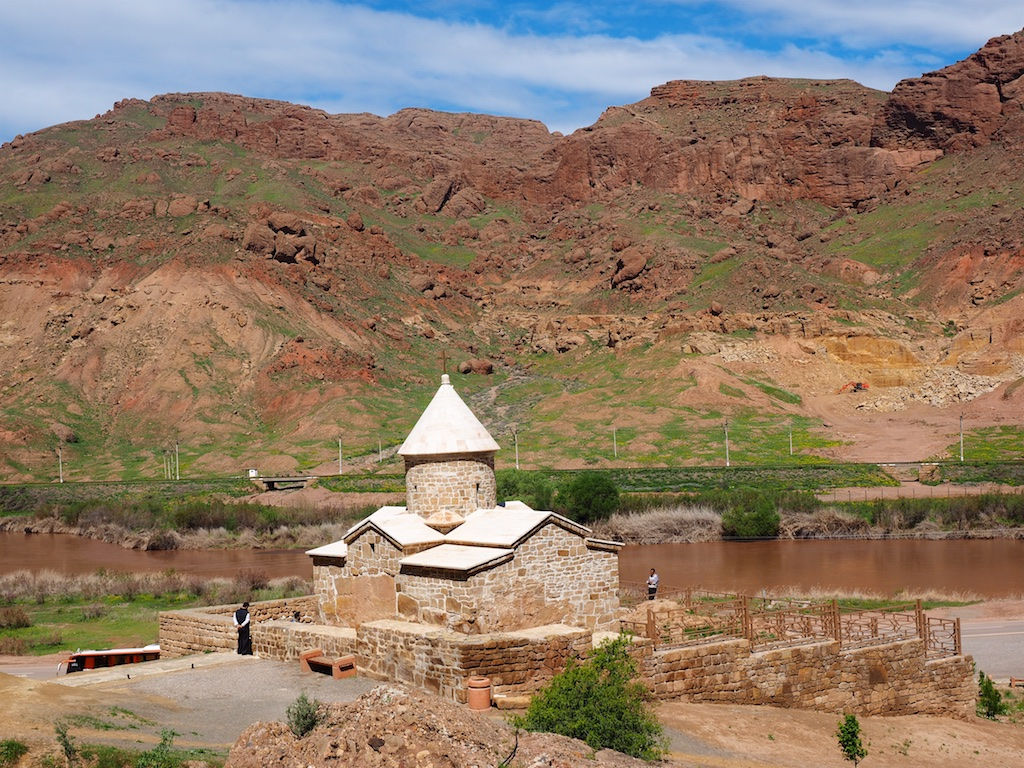
- Chapel of Chupan

- Location within Iran

Religion
- Affiliation: Armenian Apostolic Church

Location
- Location: Jolfa, East Azarbaijan Province, Iran
- Interactive map of Chapel of Chupan; Հովվի մատուռ
- Coordinates: 38.97549577°N 45.5729118°E

Architecture
- Type: Church
- Groundbreaking: 1518
- UNESCO World Heritage Site
- Official name: Armenian Monastic Ensembles of Iran
- Type: Cultural
- Criteria: ii, iii, vi
- Designated: 2008 (32nd session)
- Reference no.: 1262
- Region: Asia-Pacific

The Chapel of Chupan, sometimes called the Shepherd's Chapel, is a small, historic Armenian church in a mountain valley west of Jolfa near the Aras River in East Azerbaijan province, Iran. It was added to Iran's National Heritage List in 2002, and designated a World Heritage Site in 2008. It is part of the Saint Stepanos Monastic Ensemble, within the Armenian Monastic Ensembles of Iran listing.

The chapel was built in 1518, likely for shepherds of the region who did not have immediate access to a church. It has a cruciform shape, and is made of stone and mortar. The interior walls are covered in plain plaster. It was rebuilt in 1836.

== Gallery ==
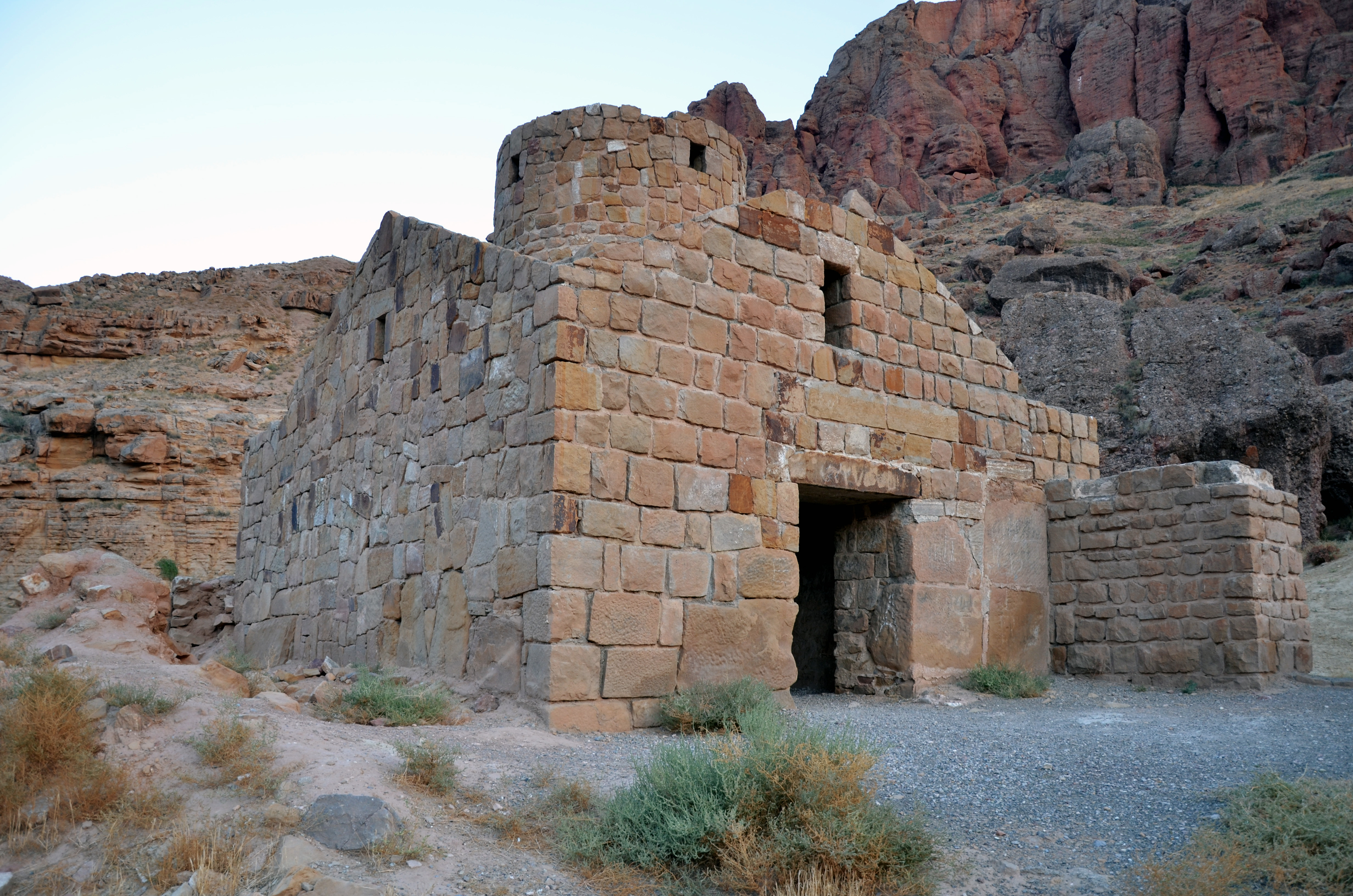
Exterior pre-restoration

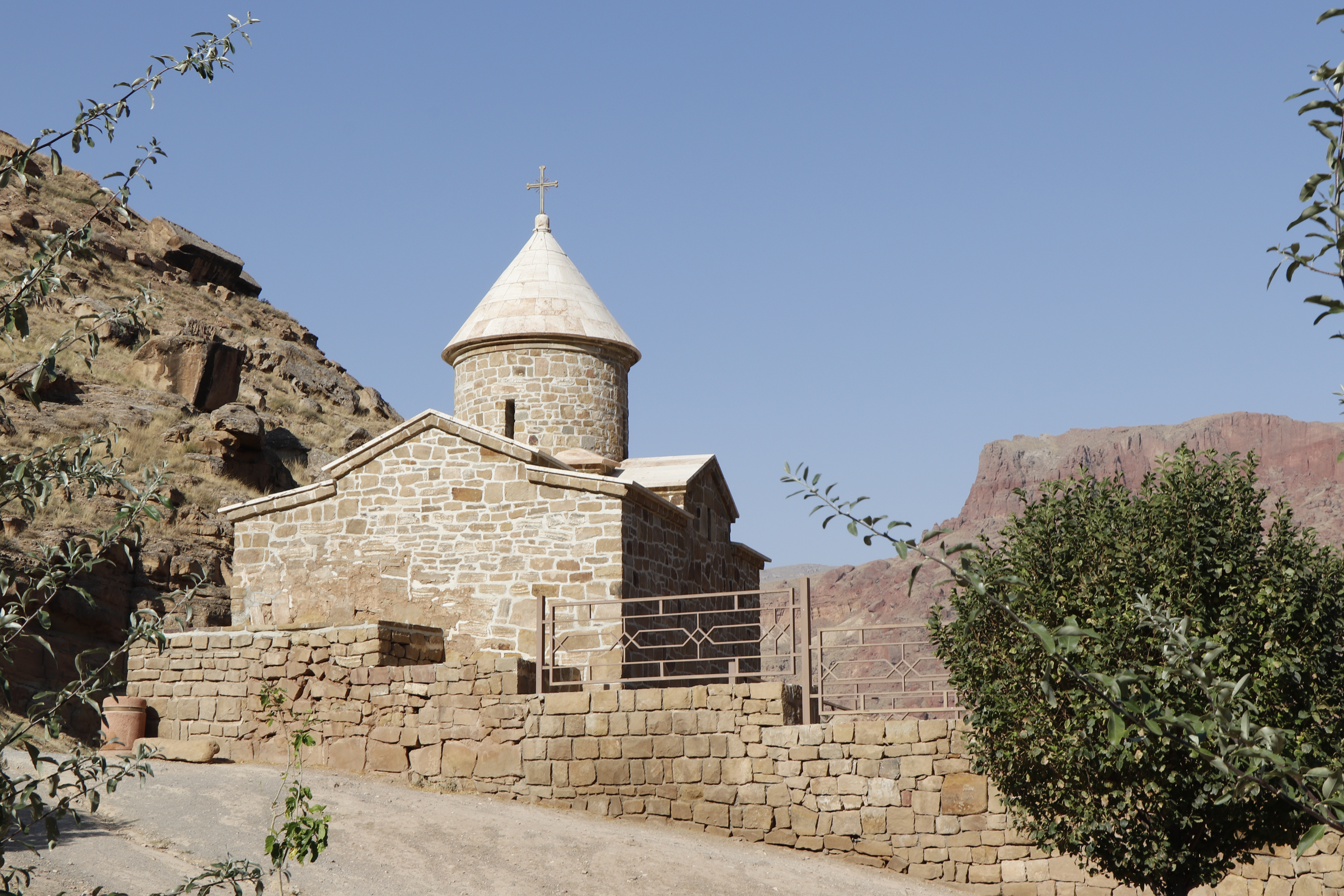

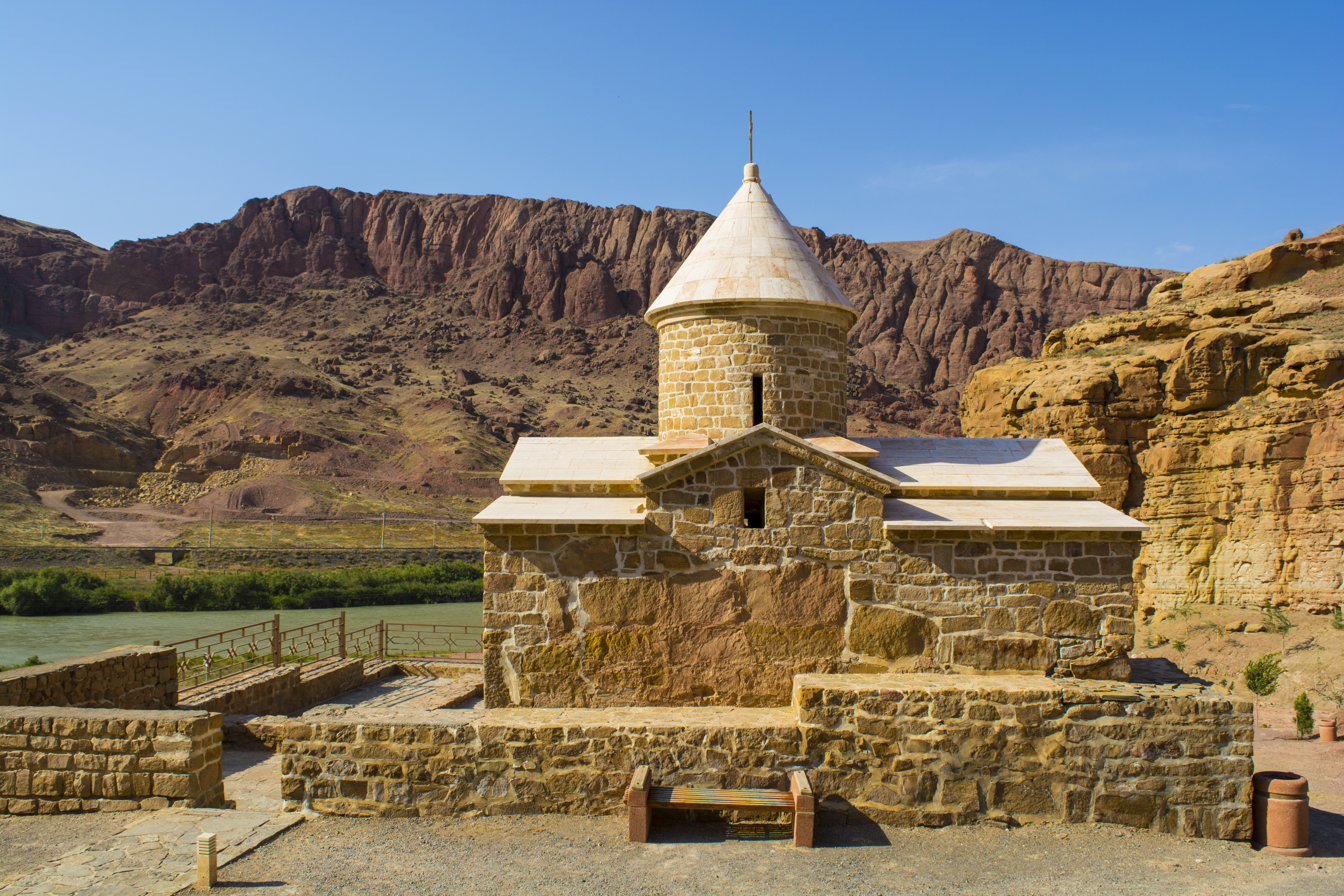
Exterior

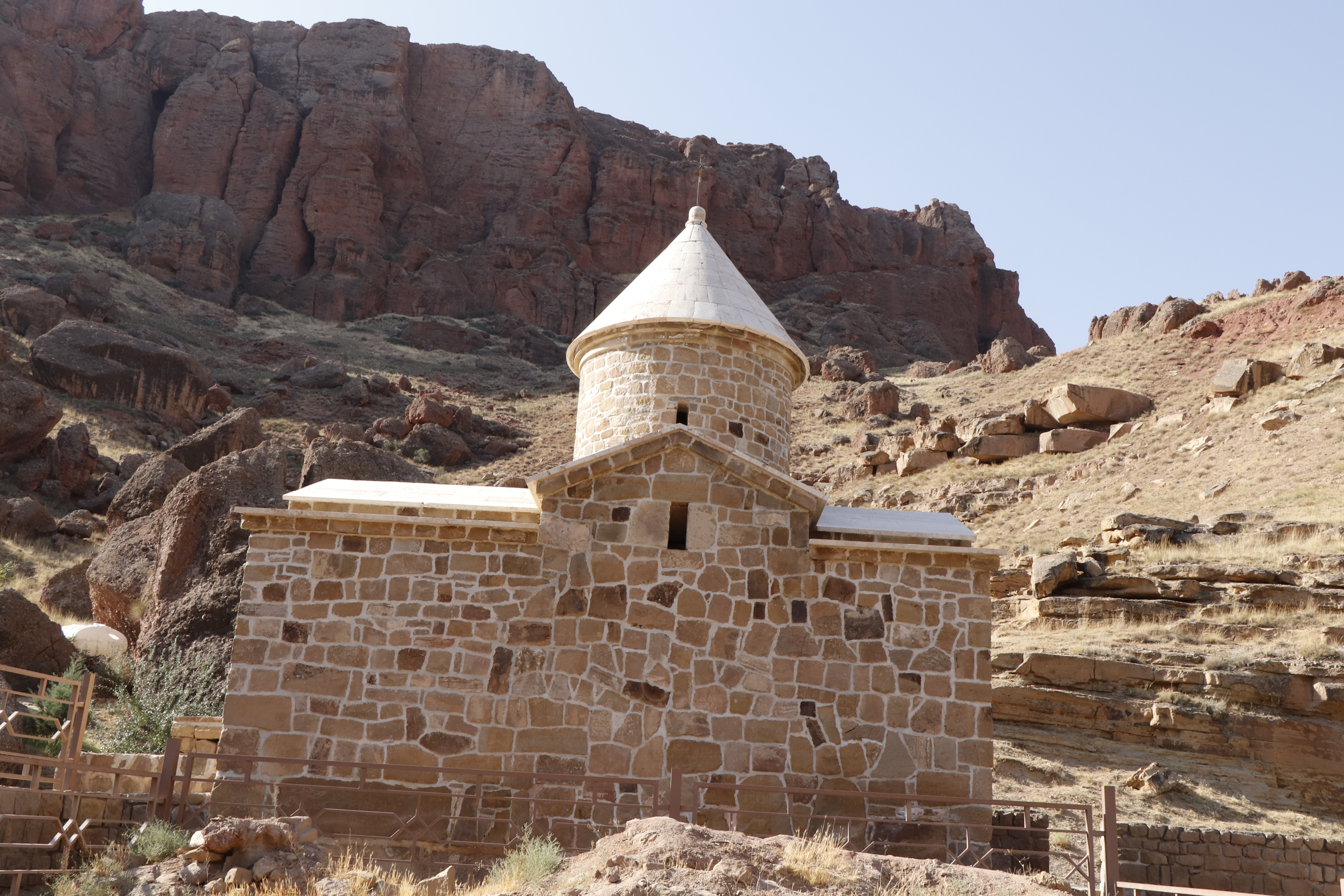

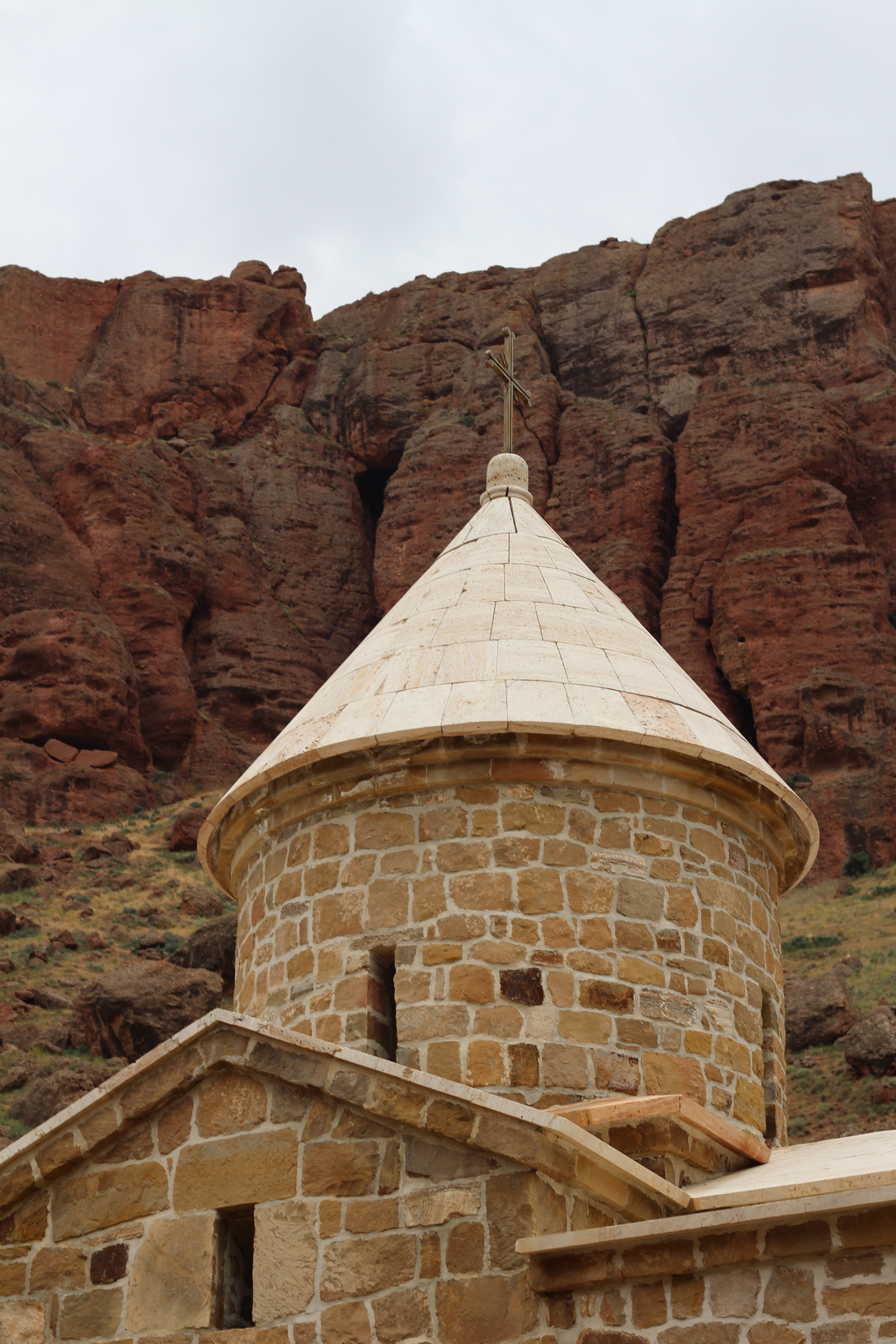

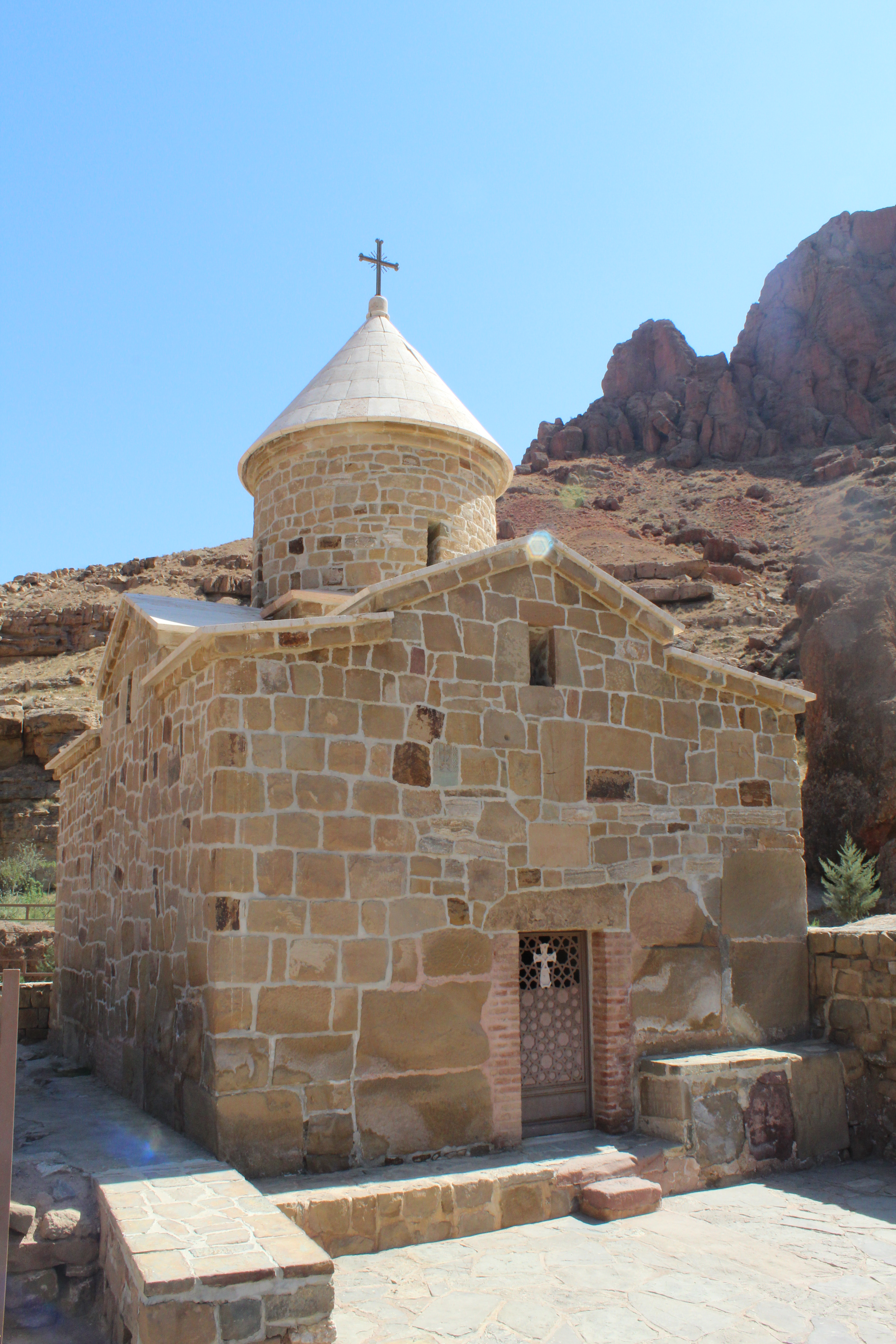
Facade

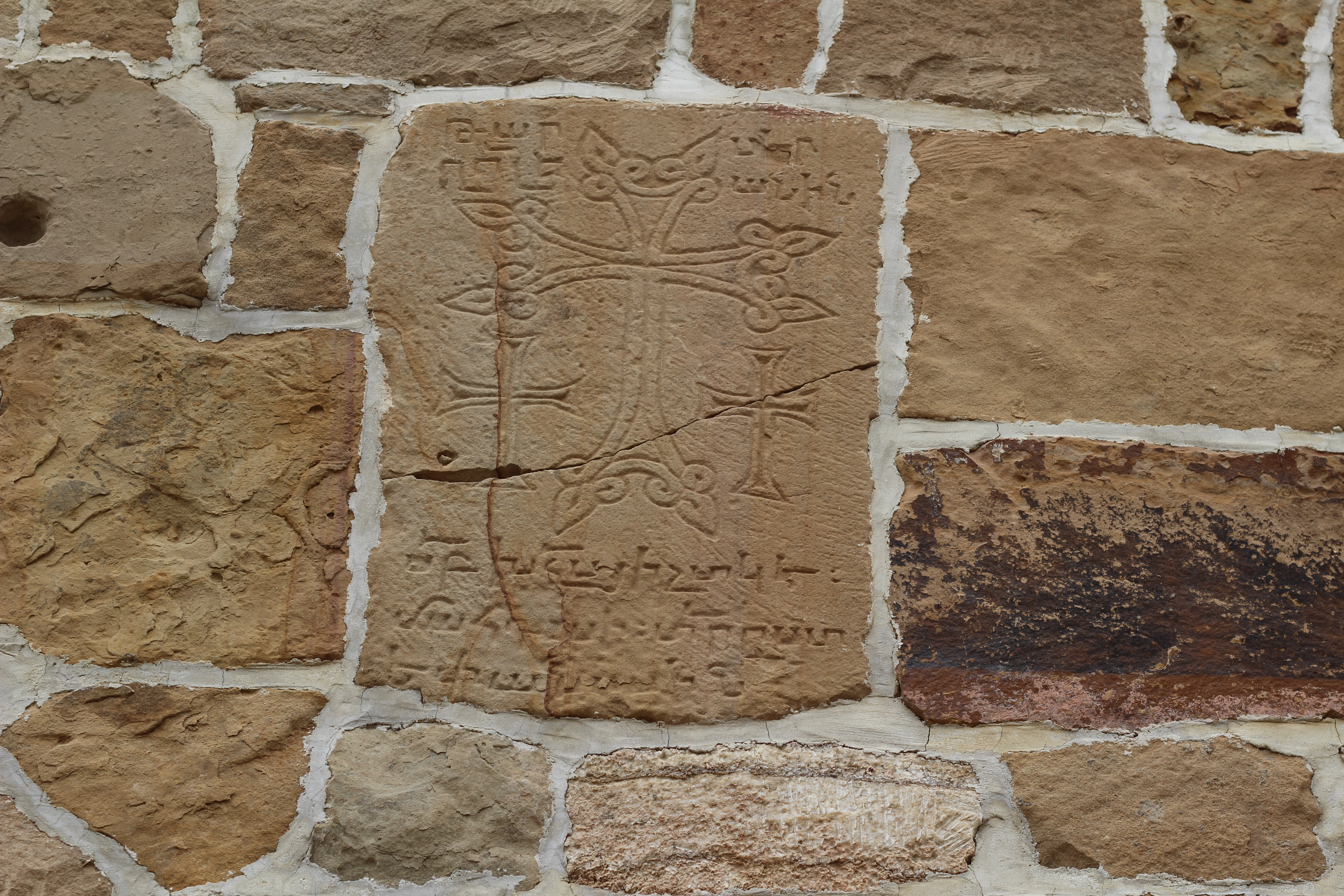
Armenian inscription on the exterior facade

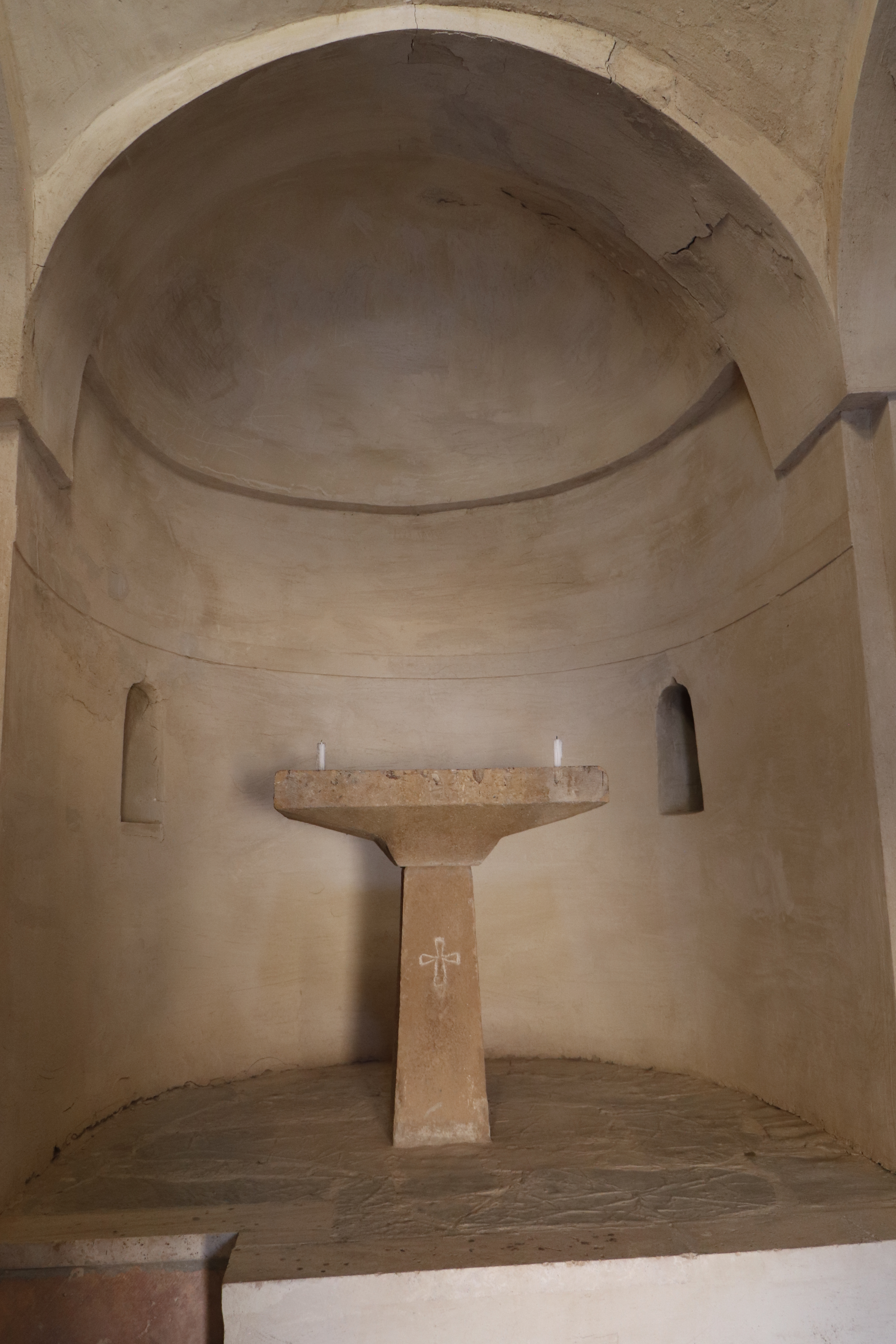
Altar

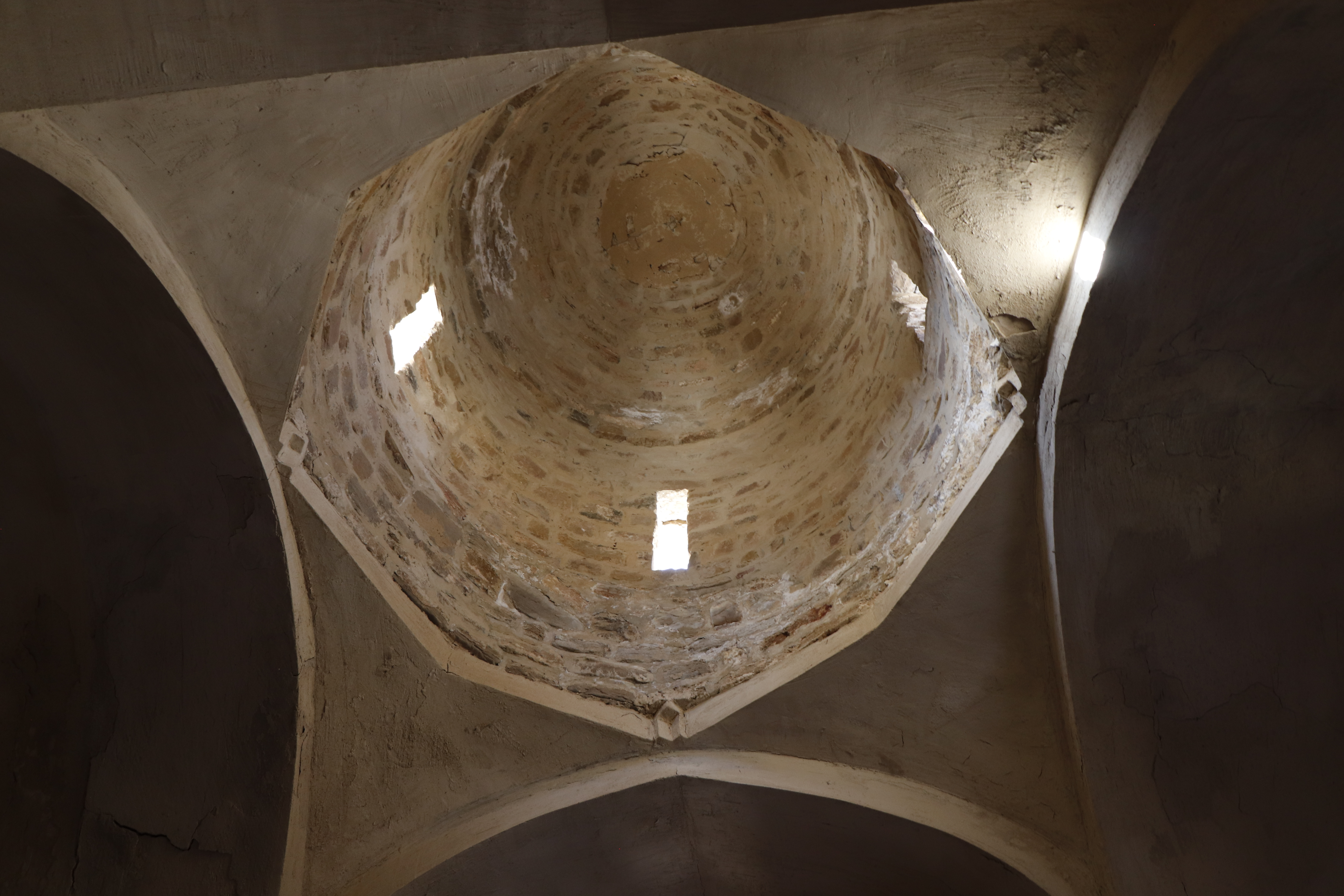
Interior of dome

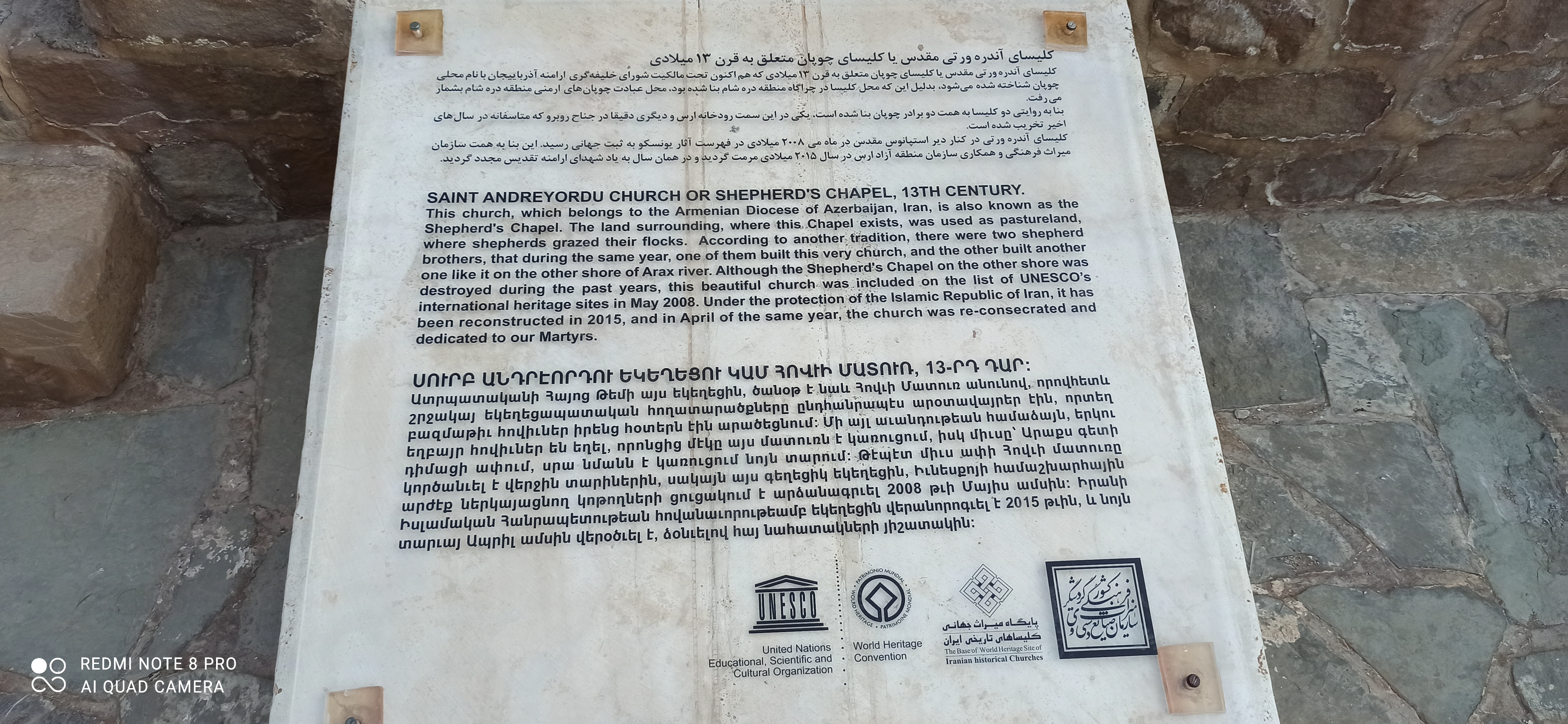
UNESCO world heritage site plaque
