= Ersi, Jolfa =

Village in East Azerbaijan province, Iran

Ersi Persian: ارسي
- Village
- Location within Iran
- Coordinates: 38°49′18″N 45°45′43″E
- Country: Iran
- Province: East Azerbaijan
- County: Jolfa
- District: Central
- Rural District: Ersi

Population (2016)
  - Total: 873
- Time zone: UTC+3:30 (IRST)

Ersi (Persian: ارسي) (Note: Also Romanized as Ersī) is a village in, and the capital of, Ersi Rural District in the Central District of Jolfa County, East Azerbaijan province, Iran.

== Demographics ==
=== Population ===
At the time of the 2006 National Census, the village's population was 879 in 271 households. The following census in 2011 counted 925 people in 328 households. The 2016 census measured the population of the village as 873 people in 342 households.
