= Daran Rural District =

Rural district in East Azerbaijan province, Iran

Daran Rural District Persian: دهستان داران
- Rural District
- Location within Iran
- Coordinates: 38°51′N 45°49′E
- Country: Iran
- Province: East Azerbaijan
- County: Jolfa
- District: Central
- Established: 1993
- Capital: Daran

Population (2016)
  - Total: 1,571
- Time zone: UTC+3:30 (IRST)

Daran Rural District (Persian: دهستان داران) is in the Central District of Jolfa County, East Azerbaijan province, Iran. Its capital is the village of Daran.

== Demographics ==
=== Population ===
At the time of the 2006 National Census, the rural district's population was 1,566 in 556 households. There were 1,533 inhabitants in 620 households in the following census of 2011. The 2016 census measured the population of the rural district as 1,571 in 670 households. The most populous of its seven villages was Daran, with 900 people.

=== Other villages in the rural district ===
- Afshar
- Ahmadabad
- Alvan
- Marazad
