= Hadishahr =

City in East Azerbaijan province, Iran

Hadishahr Persian: هاديشهر
- City
- Location within Iran
- Coordinates: 38°50′24″N 45°39′53″E
- Country: Iran
- Province: East Azerbaijan
- County: Jolfa
- District: Central

Population (2016)
  - Total: 34,346
- Time zone: UTC+3:30 (IRST)

Hadishahr (Persian: هاديشهر) (Note: Also romanized as Hādī Shahr and Hādīshahr; formerly known as Alamdar-e Gargar) is a city in the Central District of Jolfa County, East Azerbaijan province, Iran.

== Demographics ==
=== Population ===
At the time of the 2006 National Census, the city's population was 27,842 in 7,552 households. The following census in 2011 counted 30,575 people in 8,922 households. The 2016 census measured the population of the city as 34,346 people in 10,744 households.

== Overview ==
Near the city of Hadishahr is the ancient site of Kul Tepe Jolfa, dating to the Chalcolithic period (5000–4500 BC). Occupation continued into the late Bronze Age. Pottery shards have been recovered from the Late Chalcolithic, Bronze Age and Urartian periods. The early site belongs to the Early Trans-Caucasian or Kura–Araxes culture, which spread through the Caucasus and the Urmia Basin.

== Notable people ==
- Haydar Hatemi (painter)
- Dariush Pirniakan (musician)

== See also ==
- Kültəpə, Azerbaijan
- Kültepe, Turkey
- Gargareans
