= Nowshiravan, East Azerbaijan =

Village in East Azerbaijan province, Iran

Nowshiravan Persian: نوشيروان
- Village
- Location within Iran
- Coordinates: 38°50′39″N 45°45′14″E
- Country: Iran
- Province: East Azerbaijan
- County: Jolfa
- District: Central
- Rural District: Ersi

Population (2016)
  - Total: 269
- Time zone: UTC+3:30 (IRST)

Nowshiravan (Persian: نوشيروان) (Note: Also romanized as Nowshīravān; also known as Anowshīravān) is a village in Ersi Rural District of the Central District in Jolfa County, East Azerbaijan province, Iran.

== Demographics ==
=== Population ===
At the time of the 2006 National Census, the village's population was 245 in 66 households. The following census in 2011 counted 202 people in 60 households. The 2016 census measured the population of the village as 269 people in 88 households.
