= Asiyab Kharabeh =

Waterfall and ruins in East Azerbaijan, Iran

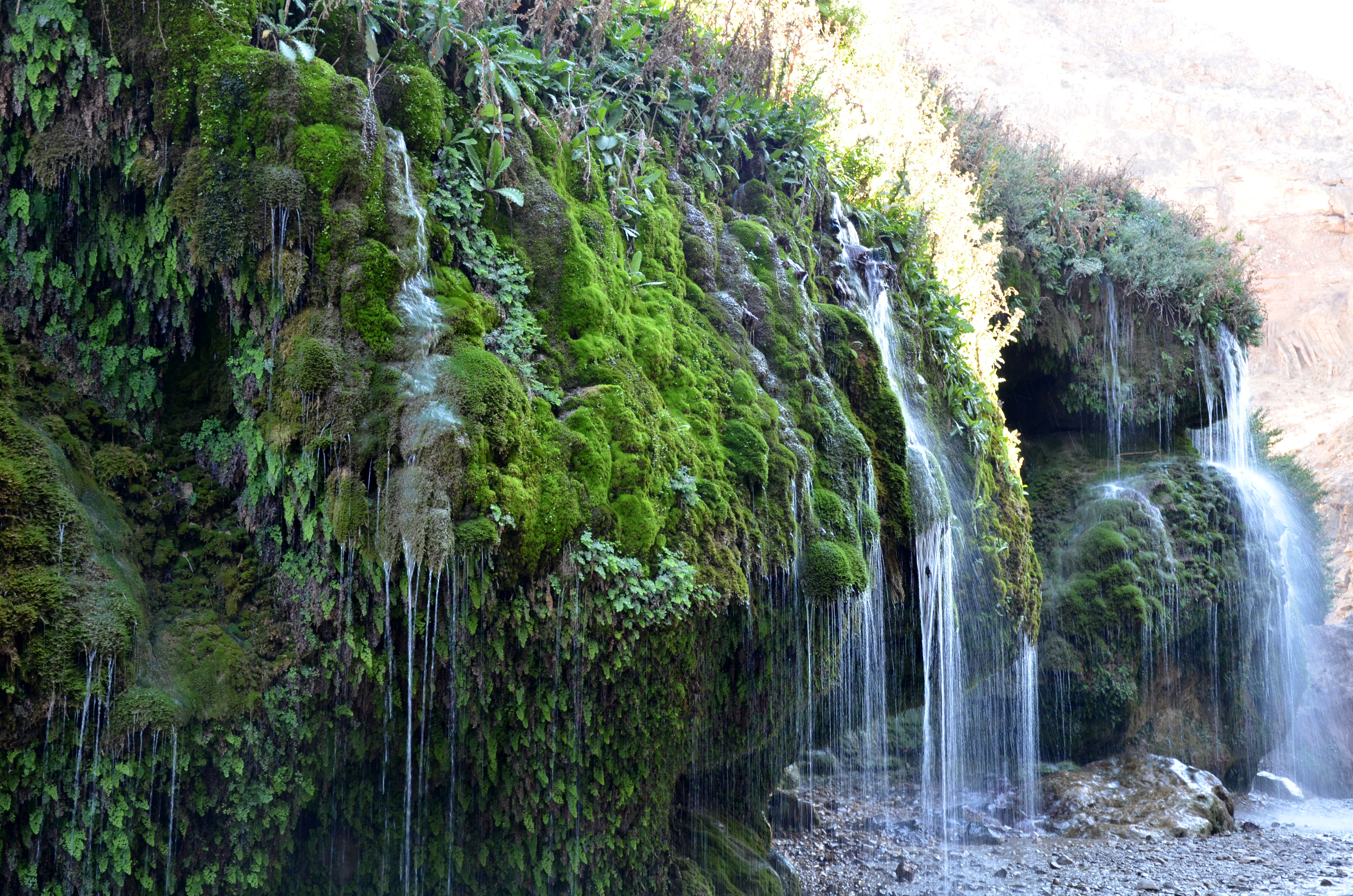
- Asiyab Kharabeh Waterfall
- Type: Waterfall
- Location: East Azerbaijan, Iran
- Coordinates: 38°55′5.82″N 45°42′23.61″E

Asiab-kharabeh (broken watermill), also known as Jolfa Water Mill, is a historic site in East Azerbaijan, Iran with ruins and a waterfall.

== History ==
Asiyab Kharabeh was a water mill that was used by the people of the region years ago, but now it is not used due to the destruction of most of it, and for this reason, it is known as the "Asiyab Kharabeh", meaning "ruin mill".

== Gallery ==
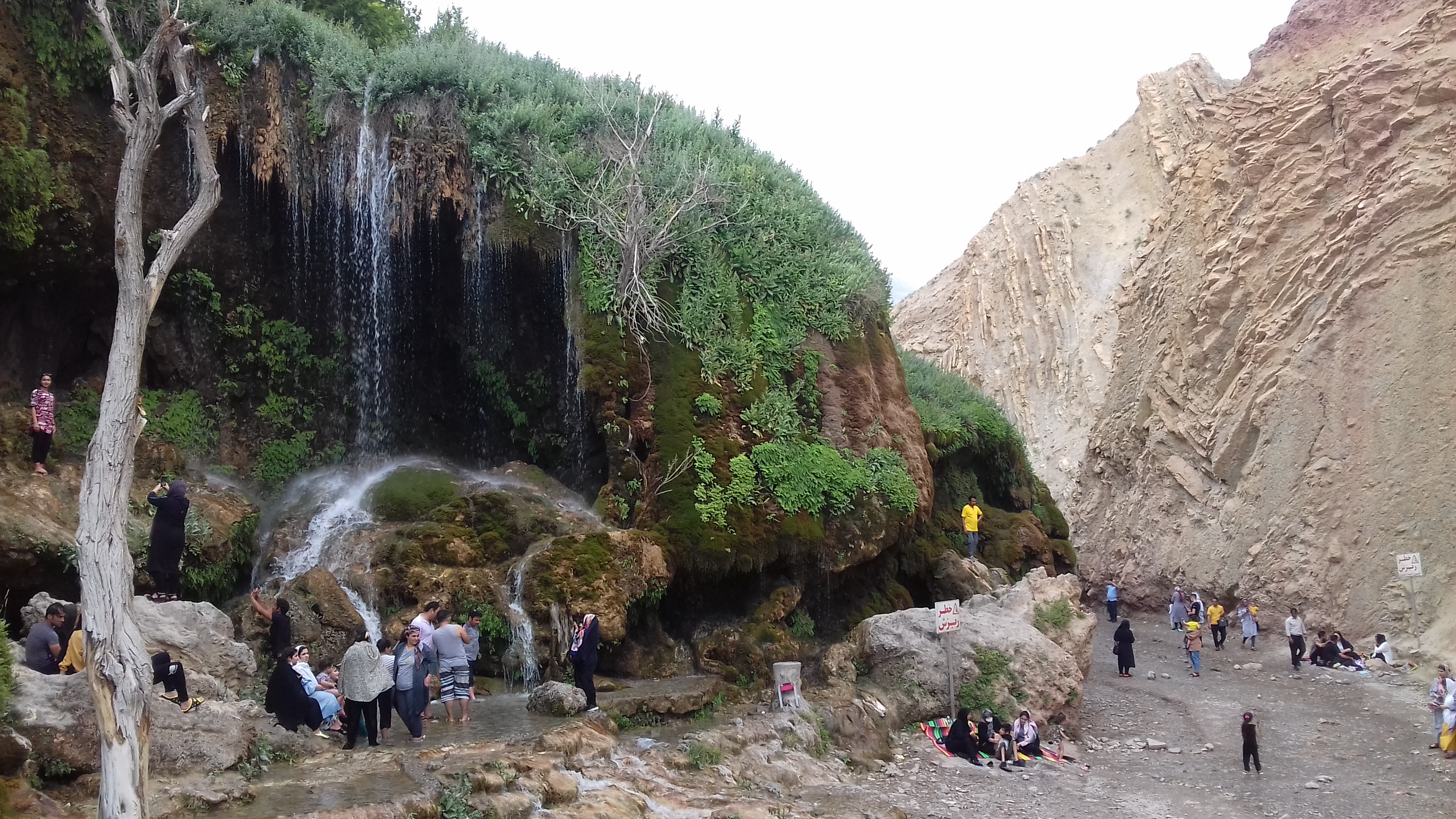
Visitors at the waterfall (2021)

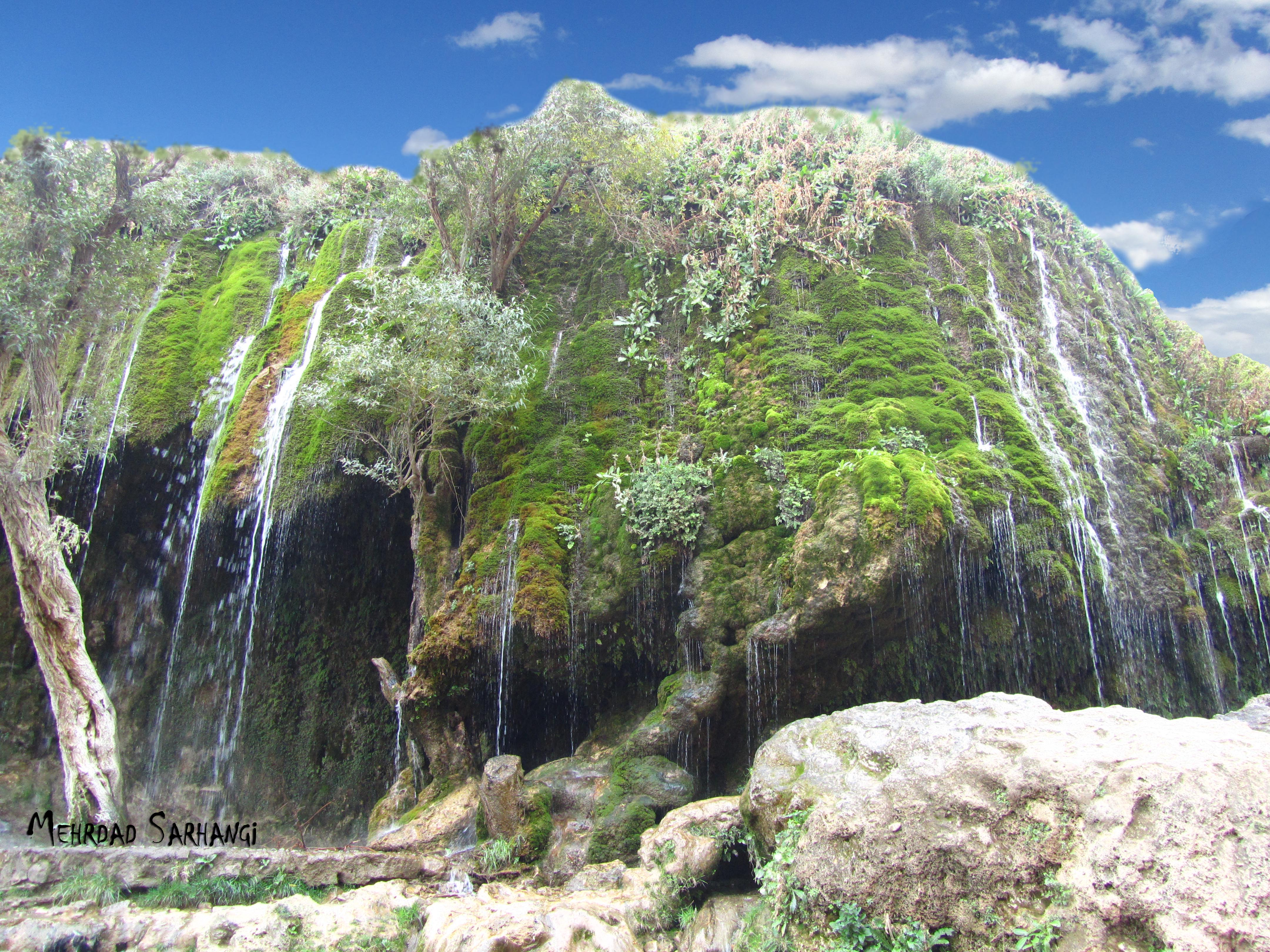
Asiyab Kharabeh (2011)

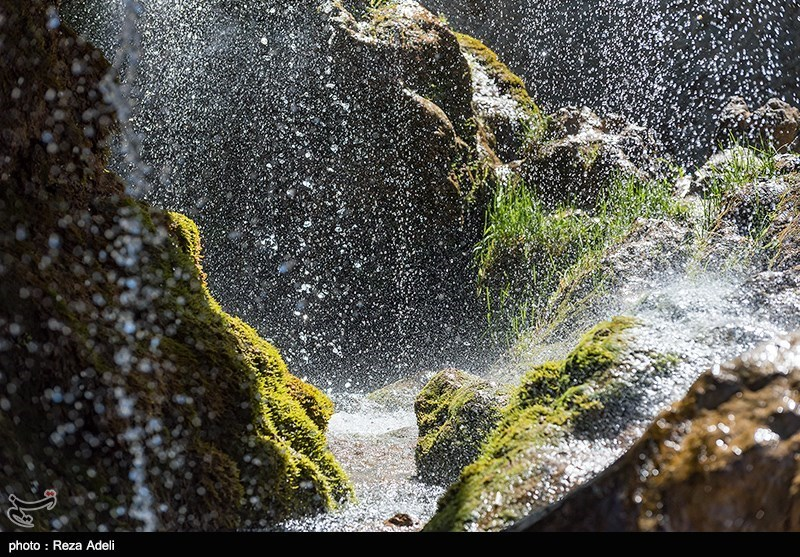
Mossy rocks under the waterfall (2019)

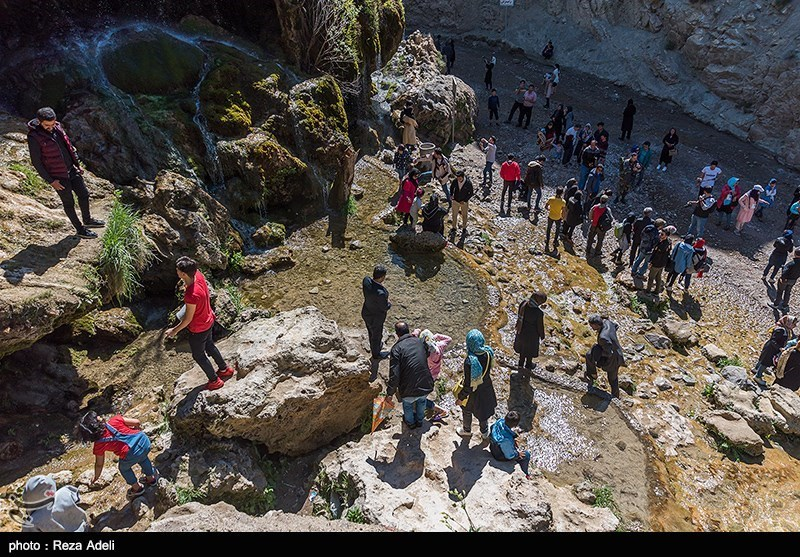
Visitors explore the ruins (2019)

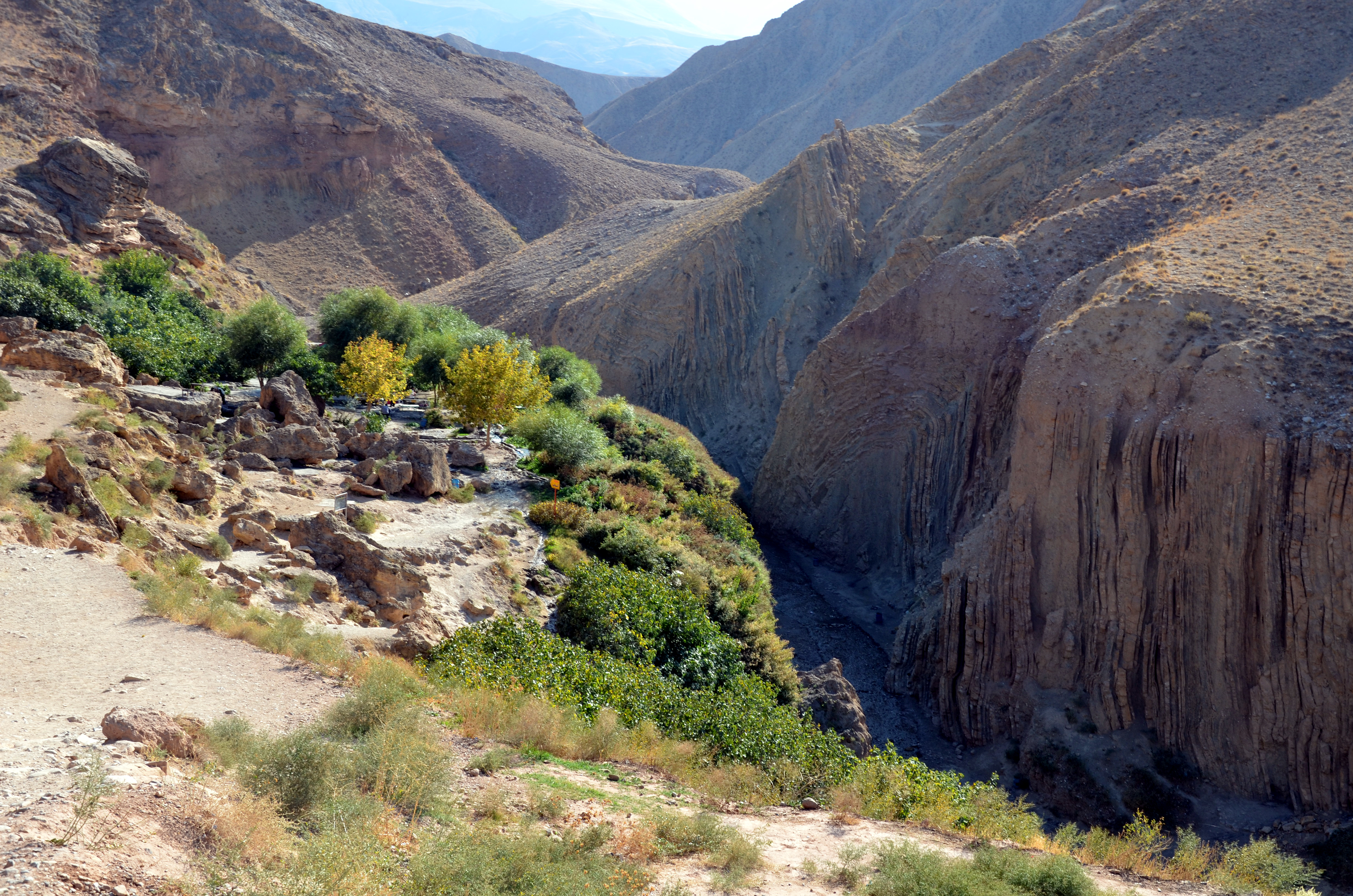
Surrounding landscape (2013)
