= Ersi Rural District =

Rural district in East Azerbaijan province, Iran

Ersi Rural District Persian: دهستان ارسي
- Rural District
- Location within Iran
- Coordinates: 38°52′N 45°45′E
- Country: Iran
- Province: East Azerbaijan
- County: Jolfa
- District: Central
- Established: 1987
- Seat: Ersi

Population (2016)
  - Total: 4,589
- Time zone: UTC+3:30 (IRST)

Ersi Rural District (Persian: دهستان ارسي) is in the Central District of Jolfa County, East Azerbaijan province, Iran. Its capital is the village of Ersi.

== Demographics ==
=== Population ===
At the time of the 2006 National Census, the rural district's population was 4,779 in 1,408 households. There were 4,250 inhabitants in 1,408 households at the following census of 2011. The 2016 census measured the population of the rural district as 4,589 in 1,655 households. The most populous of its seven villages was Livarjan, with 1,900 people.

=== Other villages in the rural district ===
- Nowshiravan
- Qeshlaq
- Siah Saran
- Zaviyeh
