= Erzi =

Erzi may refer to:

- Erzi (village), Dzheyrakhsky District, Ingushetia, Russia
- Erzi Nature Reserve, in the Caucasus Mountains, Russia
- Sons (1996 film) (Pinyin: Érzǐ), a Chinese film
