= Shoja Rural District =

Rural district in East Azerbaijan province, Iran

Shoja Rural District Persian: دهستان شجاع
- Rural District
- Location within Iran
- Coordinates: 38°52′N 45°30′E
- Country: Iran
- Province: East Azerbaijan
- County: Jolfa
- District: Central
- Established: 1987
- Capital: Shoja

Population (2016)
  - Total: 4,036
- Time zone: UTC+3:30 (IRST)

Shoja Rural District (Persian: دهستان شجاع) is in the Central District of Jolfa County, East Azerbaijan province, Iran. Its capital is the village of Shoja.

== Demographics ==
=== Population ===
At the time of the 2006 National Census, the rural district's population was 4,499 in 1,219 households. There were 4,744 inhabitants in 1,446 households at the following census of 2011. The 2016 census measured the population of the rural district as 4,036 in 1,339 households. The most populous of its 15 villages was Shoja, with 2,538 people.

=== Other villages in the rural district ===
- Qarah Bolagh
- Silgerd
