= Central District (Jolfa County) =

District in East Azerbaijan province, Iran

Central District (Jolfa County) Persian: بخش مرکزی شهرستان جلفا
- District
- Location within Iran
- Coordinates: 38°51′N 45°37′E
- Country: Iran
- Province: East Azerbaijan
- County: Jolfa
- Established: 1995
- Capital: Jolfa

Population (2016)
  - Total: 53,352
- Time zone: UTC+3:30 (IRST)

The Central District of Jolfa County (Persian: بخش مرکزی شهرستان جلفا) is in East Azerbaijan province, Iran. Its capital is the city of Jolfa.

== Demographics ==
=== Population ===
At the time of the 2006 National Census, the district's population was 43,669 in 12,100 households. The following census in 2011 counted 46,730 people in 13,844 households. The 2016 census measured the population of the district as 53,352 inhabitants in 16,955 households.

=== Administrative divisions ===
Central District (Jolfa County) Population
Administrative Divisions	2006	2011	2016
Daran RD	1,566	1,533	1,571
Ersi RD	4,779	4,250	4,589
Shoja RD	4,499	4,744	4,036
Hadishahr (city)	27,842	30,575	34,346
Jolfa (city)	4,983	5,628	8,810
Total	43,669	46,730	53,352
RD = Rural District
