= List of popular science mass media outlets =

This is a list of popular science mass media outlets.

- ABC Science – website owned by Australian Broadcasting Corporation
- Archibald Higgins – science comics series
- Are We Alone? – Seth Shostak science radio program
- Ask A Biologist – audio podcast program and website
- BBC Focus – magazine
- BBC Horizon – TV series
- BBC Science & Nature – latest news in nature and science
- BBC Sky at Night – a monthly magazine about astronomy aimed at amateur astronomers
- BEYOND: Center for Fundamental Concepts in Science – website of Arizona State University
- British Science Association – providing all ages learning about the sciences; advancing public understanding; thought-provoking its many implications
- CASW: Council for the Advancement of Science Writing – increasing public understanding of science
- CBS News – Science 60 Minutes: Health/Science Nature This Morning: HealthWatch Evening News: Health Sunday Morning: Nature
- Cosmos Magazine – Australian magazine
- Cosmos: A Personal Voyage – 1980 television series by Carl Sagan, with its companion book
- Cosmos: A Spacetime Odyssey – 2014 television hosted by Neil deGrasse Tyson based on the 1980 Carl Sagan series
- Daily Planet – Canadian television series
- Discover – magazine
- Discovery – BBC World Service radio programme and podcasts
- Discovery Channel' – cable/satellite television channel
- Edge – online magazine exploring scientific and intellectual ideas
- Exploratorium – museum in San Francisco
- Frontiers of Science – comic strip
- Guru Magazine – digital 'science-lifestyle' magazine
- HowStuffWorks – website
- Inside Science – BBC Radio 4 news stories keeping the audience abreast of important breakthroughs in science
- Inside Science (AIP) – syndicating research news and related topics for general audiences through the press, the TV, and the web
- Institute of Making – materials science and technology from many different perspectives
- ITV Science News – videos, stories, and the latest live updates
- Knowing Neurons – a website featuring neuroscience articles, infographics, artwork, and videos
- Leading Edge – BBC Radio 4 series explores the world of science, people, passions & policies; final edition celebrating Darwin's 150th anniversary
- The Life Scientific – Jim Al-Khalili talks to leading scientists about their life and work (BBC Radio 4)
- Little Atoms – weekly chat show on Resonance104.4FM in London; also podcasts
- LiveScience – syndicating major news outlets with an online news-magazine format
- Material World – weekly science magazine on BBC Radio 4
- MITnews:science – Massachusetts Institute of Technology's recent news, featured stories, and videos
- MIT Technology Review – a magazine with authoritative journalism in clear simple language
- Mr Science Show – radio show and podcast from China Radio International
- MythBusters – American TV series that seeks to confirm or debunk science-related stories, urban legends, viral videos, etc.
- The Naked Scientists – audience-interactive radio talk show
- NASA – news, images, videos, TV, and interactive features from the unique perspective of America's space agency
- National Geographic Society – one of the largest non-profit scientific and educational institutions in the world
- Natural History – the magazine of the American Museum of Natural History
- Natural History Museum (London) – "Nature online – explore the natural world"
- The Nature of Things - CBC Television program
- NBC News – Science Technology Health
- New Scientist – magazine
- NHS choices – UK health "Behind the Headlines ¬ Your guide to the science that makes the news"
- Nova – television show on PBS; PBS Science & Nature PBS NewsHour: Science and the Nova ScienceNow TV spinoff
- Nova: science in the news – Australian Academy of Science making accessible, and looking behind the headlines
- Ologies with Alie Ward – weekly podcast
- The Periodic Table of Videos – a series of YouTube videos featuring chemistry professor Martyn Poliakoff
- PLOS: Public Library of Science – available to every scientist, physician, educator, and citizens at home, in school, or in a library
- Plus – popular maths online magazine featuring the beauty and the practical; diverse topics such as art, medicine, cosmology, sport, puzzles & games
- Popular Mechanics – magazine
- Popular Science – magazine
- Popular Science Historic Film Series – short films
- Quirks & Quarks – Canadian radio show and podcast on CBC Radio; CBCnews Technology & Science
- Quo – Spanish-language magazine
- Radiolab – listen, read, watch; imaginative use of radio and podcast making science accessible to broad audiences
- The Ri Channel – the Royal Institution, showcasing science videos from around the web
- Science – journal of the American Association for the Advancement of Science
- Science (TV network) – cable/satellite television channel
- ScienceBlogs – some of the best-known independent science bloggers within ten subject channels
- science fantastic – Michio Kaku radio program
- Science Friday – American radio show on NPR; NPR Science
- The Science Hour – BBC World Service radio programme weekly digest of Discovery, Click, Health Check and Science in Action and podcasts
- Science Illustrated – a popular magazine with editions in other languages
- Science in Action (radio program) – long-running weekly broadcast on BBC World Service
- Science Museum (London) – "Online Science"
- Science News – magazine
- Science Niblets – online magazine
- Science World (magazine) – especially educating children and covering many aspects
- Scientific American – magazine
- Seed – magazine
- Smithsonian – a magazine published by the Smithsonian Institution
- Startalk Radio – hosted by Neil deGrasse Tyson
- "The Aurora Press (Online Science Magazine" Online Science Magazine Focused On Long-Form In-Depth Coverage
- Technologist – magazine and website published by the EuroTech Universities Alliance
- This Week in Science – American radio show and podcast
- Through the Wormhole – documentary television series with Morgan Freeman
- VOA News, and VOA's Science World
- WIRED – WIRED Science WIRED Science Blogs WIRED UK Science
- ZSL: Institute of Zoology (London) – "Latest News from Science"

== See also ==
- List of science magazines
- List of science books
