= Ten-percent-of-the-brain myth =

Myth regarding human brain usage

Human brain and skull

The ten-percent-of-the-brain myth states that humans generally use only one-tenth (or some other small fraction) of their brains. It has been misattributed to many famous scientists and historical figures, notably Albert Einstein. By extrapolation, it is suggested that a person may 'harness' or 'unlock' this unused potential and increase their intelligence.

Changes in grey and white matter following new experiences and learning have been shown, but it has not yet been proven what the changes are. The popular notion that large parts of the brain remain unused, and could subsequently be "activated", rests in folklore and not science. Though specific mechanisms regarding brain function remain to be fully described—e.g. memory, consciousness—the physiology of brain mapping suggests that all areas of the brain have a function and that they are used nearly all the time.

== Origin ==
A likely origin for the "10% myth" is the reserve energy theories of Harvard psychologists William James and Boris Sidis. In the 1890s, they tested the theory in the accelerated raising of the child prodigy William Sidis. Thereafter, James told lecture audiences that people only meet a fraction of their full mental potential, which is a plausible claim.

The concept gained currency by circulating within the self-help movement of the 1920s; for example, the 1929 World Almanac states "There is NO LIMIT to what the human brain can accomplish. Scientists and psychologists tell us we use only about TEN PERCENT of our brain power."

This became a particular "pet idea" of science fiction writer and editor John W. Campbell, who wrote in a 1932 short story that "no man in all history ever used even half of the thinking part of his brain".

In 1936, American writer and broadcaster Lowell Thomas popularized the idea, in a foreword to Dale Carnegie's How to Win Friends and Influence People, by including the falsely precise percentage: "Professor William James of Harvard used to say that the average man develops only ten percent of his latent mental ability".

In the 1970s, the Bulgarian-born psychologist and educator Georgi Lozanov proposed the teaching method of suggestopedia, believing "that we might be using only five to ten percent of our mental capacity".

The origin of the myth has also been attributed to Wilder Penfield, the U.S.-born neurosurgeon who was the first director of Montreal Neurological Institute of McGill University.

According to a related origin story, the ten-percent myth most likely arose from a misunderstanding (or misrepresentation) of neurological research in the late 19th century or early 20th century. For example, the functions of many brain regions (especially in the cerebral cortex) are complex enough that the effects of damage are subtle, leading early neurologists to wonder what these regions did. The brain was also discovered to consist mostly of glial cells, which seemed to have very minor functions. James W. Kalat, the author of the textbook Biological Psychology, points out that neuroscientists in the 1930s knew about the large number of "local" neurons in the brain. The misunderstanding of the function of local neurons may have led to the ten-percent myth. The myth might have been propagated simply by a truncation of the idea that some use a small percentage of their brains at any given time. In the same article in Scientific American, John Henley, a neurologist at the Mayo Clinic in Rochester, Minnesota, states: "Evidence would show over a day you use 100 percent of the brain".

Although several parts of the brain have broadly understood functions, the manner in which brain cells (i.e. neurons and glia) produce certain particular behaviours and disorders remains unclear. Perhaps the broadest, most mysterious question is how diverse regions of the brain collaborate to form conscious experiences. So far, there is no evidence that there is one site responsible for consciousness, which leads experts to believe that it stems from multiple areas of the brain. Therefore, as with Kalat's idea that humans have untapped cognitive potential, it may be that a large number of questions about the brain have not been fully answered.

== Analysis ==
Neurologist Barry Gordon refuted the theory, stating: "We use virtually every part of the brain, and ... (most of) the brain is active almost all the time." Neuroscientist Barry Beyerstein sets out six kinds of evidence disproving the ten-percent myth:

- Studies of brain damage: If 10% of the brain is normally used, then damage to other areas should not impair performance. Instead, there is almost no area of the brain that can be damaged without loss of abilities. Even slight damage to small areas of the brain can have profound effects.
- Brain scans have shown that no matter what one is doing, all brain areas are always active. Some areas are more active at any one time than others, but barring brain damage, there is no part of the brain that is absolutely not functioning. Technologies such as positron emission tomography (PET) and functional magnetic resonance imaging (fMRI) allow the activity of the living brain to be monitored. They reveal that even during sleep, all parts of the brain show some level of activity. Only in the case of serious damage does a brain have "silent" areas.
- The brain is enormously costly to the rest of the body, in terms of oxygen and nutrient consumption. It can require up to 20 percent of the body's energy—more than any other organ—despite making up only 2 percent of the human body weight. If most of it were unnecessary, there would be a large survival advantage to humans with smaller, more efficient brains. If this were true, the process of natural selection would have eliminated the inefficient brain portions. It is also highly unlikely that a brain with so much redundant matter would have evolved in the first place; given the historical risk of death in childbirth associated with the large brain size (and therefore skull size) of humans, there would be a strong selection pressure against such a large brain size if less than half of it were needed.
- Localization of function: Rather than acting as a single mass, the brain has distinct regions for different kinds of information processing. Decades of research have gone into mapping functions onto areas of the brain, and no functionless areas have been found.
- Microstructural analysis: In the single-unit recording technique, researchers insert a tiny electrode into the brain to monitor the activity of a single cell. If most cells were unused, then this technique would have revealed that.
- Synaptic pruning: Brain cells that are not used have a tendency to degenerate. Hence, if most of the brain were inactive, autopsy of normal adult brains would reveal large-scale degeneration.

In debunking the ten-percent myth, Knowing Neurons editor Gabrielle-Ann Torre writes that using all of one's brain would not be desirable either. Such unfettered activity would almost certainly trigger an epileptic seizure. Torre writes that, even at rest, a person likely uses as much of their brain as reasonably possible through the default mode network, a widespread brain network that is active and synchronized even in the absence of any cognitive task. Thus, "large portions of the brain are never truly dormant, as the 10% myth might otherwise suggest."

== In popular culture ==
Some proponents of the "ten percent of the brain" belief have long asserted that the "unused" nine-tenths is capable of exhibiting psychic powers and can be trained to perform psychokinesis and extra-sensory perception. This concept is especially associated with the proposed field of "psionics" (psychic + electronics), a favorite project of the influential science fiction editor John W. Campbell, Jr. in the 1950s and '60s. There is no scientifically verified body of evidence supporting the existence of such powers. Such beliefs remain widespread among New Age proponents to the present day.

In 1980, Roger Lewin published an article in Science, "Is Your Brain Really Necessary?", about studies by John Lorber on cerebral cortex losses. He reports the case of a Sheffield University student who had a measured IQ of 126 and passed a Mathematics Degree but who had hardly any discernible brain matter at all since his cortex was extremely reduced by hydrocephalus. The article led to the broadcast of a Yorkshire Television documentary of the same title, though it was about a different patient who had normal brain mass distributed in an unusual way in a very large skull. Explanations were proposed for the first student's situation, with reviewers noting that Lorber's scans evidenced that the subject's brain mass was not absent, but compacted into the small space available, possibly compressed to a greater density than regular brain tissue.

Several books, films, and short stories have been written closely related to this myth. They include the 1986 film Flight of the Navigator; the 1995 film Powder; the novel The Dark Fields and its 2011 film adaptation, Limitless (claiming 20 percent rather than the typical 10 percent); the 1991 film Defending Your Life; the television show The 4400; the ninth book (White Night) of Jim Butcher's book series The Dresden Files; the shōnen manga Psyren; and the 2014 film Lucy—many of which operate under the notion that the rest of the brain could be accessed through use of a drug. Lucy in particular depicts a character who gains increasingly godlike abilities once she surpasses 10 percent, though the film suggests that 10 percent represents brain capacity at a particular time rather than permanent usage.

The myth was examined on a 27 October 2010 episode of MythBusters. The hosts used magnetoencephalography and functional magnetic resonance imaging to scan the brain of someone attempting a complicated mental task, and found that as much as 35% was used during their test.

== See also ==
- Educational psychology
- List of common misconceptions
- Human Potential Movement
- Pineal gland, a part of the brain that has attracted pseudoscientific interest
- Savant syndrome
