= Overheard at National Geographic =

Podcast produced by National Geographic

Overheard at National Geographic is a science and travel podcast produced by National Geographic hosted by Peter Gwin and Amy Briggs.

== Background ==
The show is a science and travel podcast produced by National Geographic. The first couple seasons were hosted by Vaughn Wallace. Season three was hosted by Peter Gwin and Amy Briggs. Each episode is about 20 minuted in length.

There are multiple episodes focused on whale song. There is an episode that focuses on United States v. One Tyrannosaurus Bataar Skeleton. Another episode focuses on scuba diving below a pryamid in Nuri to explore the Kingdom of Kush. In another episode, the show focuses on the psychology of child lying and its effects on a child's development.

== Reception ==
=== Awards ===
Award	Date	Recipient	Category	Result	Ref.
iHeartRadio Podcast Awards	2020	Overheard at National Geographic	Best Travel Podcast	Won	
Signal Awards	2023	Overheard at National Geographic: "Amelia Earhart"	Interview or Talk Show	gold	
Webby Awards	2020	Overheard at National Geographic	Science and Education Podcasts	Won	
Webby Awards	2020	Overheard at National Geographic: "The Harem Conspiracy"	Best Individual Podcast Episode	Nominated	
Ambies	2022	Overheard at National Geographic	Best Knowledge, Science or Tech Podcast	Won	
