= Roy Hamilton (disambiguation) =

Roy Hamilton may refer to:

- Roy Hamilton (1929–1969), American singer
- Roy Hamilton (basketball) (born 1957), American basketball player
- Roy "Royalty" Hamilton, American pop and R&B songwriter, record producer, and musician
- Roy Hamilton, M.D., M.S., American neurologist and clinician
