= Trip Gabriel =

American journalist

Trip Gabriel is an American political journalist who works for The New York Times. He has covered each presidential campaign since 2012, as well as numerous U.S. Senate, congressional and gubernatorial races. Much of his reporting has focused on voters, demographics and the battleground states; especially as Donald Trump disrupted traditional party coalitions. In 2015, Gabriel was based in Iowa during the run-up to the presidential caucuses, as Trump began consolidating his hold on Republicans.

In 2019, his article about Representative Steve King of Iowa as a precursor to Trump's politics of anti-immigrant nationalism created an uproar, after King told the reporter: “White nationalist, white supremacist, Western civilization — how did that language become offensive?” King, a Republican, was stripped of his committee assignments in the House of Representatives by republican leaders.

Other coverage by Gabriel that had a high impact included reporting about Republicans using critical race theory as a culture-war issue in 2021; the political formation of Pete Buttigieg when he sought the 2020 Democratic nomination; the crushing down-ballot losses by Democrats in 2020, and the foreign policy stumbles of Ben Carson in 2015, in which an advisor to Carson, Duane R. Clarridge, told The Times, “Nobody has been able to sit down with him and have him get one iota of intelligent information about the Middle East."

Since November 2023, he has written obituaries for the Times. In his bio on X (formerly Twitter), he describes himself as a former politics reporter.

== Career ==
Gabriel joined The Times in 1994 as a reporter in the Style department. In 1997, he became editor of the Sunday Styles section and also worked as the director of fashion news. He conceived the long-running "Modern Love" column, one of the newspaper's most popular features. Under his direction, the once struggling Styles section grew and developed into a multifaceted presentation of fashion, lifestyle, entertainment and celebrity news. As a result of that success, Gabriel spun off a separate "Thursday Styles" section in 2007.

After 12 years guiding Styles, Gabriel returned to reporting in 2010. He covered education nationally, including the series "Cheat Sheet" about academic plagiarism and other cheating by students and teachers.

Before joining The Times, Gabriel contributed to many magazines, including Rolling Stone, Vanity Fair, and GQ. In 2017, he described experiencing a rare case of transient global amnesia in the journal Cognitive and Behavioral Neurology.
