= Excess Baggage =

Excess Baggage may refer to:

- Checked baggage that exceeds a carrier's maximum permitted weight or volume and for which an additional charge is payable

== Films ==
- Excess Baggage (1928 film), American lost silent comedy
- Excess Baggage (1933 film), British comedy
- Excess Baggage (1997 film), American crime comedy Alicia Silverstone and Benicio del Toro

== Radio and television ==
- Excess Baggage (radio programme), 2010–12 British travel series on BBC Radio 4
- Excess Baggage (Australian TV series), 2012 Australian reality show
