= Stuart Farrimond =

British science communicator (1982–2025)

Stuart John George Farrimond (17 April 1982 – 17 May 2025) was a British science communicator, food scientist for BBC's Inside the Factory, best-selling science author, and brain tumour researcher.

== Early life and education ==
Farrimond was born in Burton-on-Trent, Staffordshire on 17 April 1982 to Maree Farrimond, a pharmacist and Methodist minister, and Robert Farrimond. After a series of relocations, the family moved to Jersey when he was 15 in order for him to attend Hautlieu School, where he was head boy. Farrimond studied medicine at the University of Nottingham, graduating with a Bachelor of Medicine, Bachelor of Surgery and Bachelor of Medical Sciences (Hons) in 2005.

== Career ==
Farrimond completed his training in Musgrove Park Hospital in Taunton and practiced medicine at the Royal United Hospital in Bath.

In 2008, he went in for a routine scan during an investigation into a hormone imbalance. This led to the incidental discovery of a brain tumour – a grade II astrocytoma. In two operations, the neoplasm was removed and he had clear brain scans for years thereafter. However, this initial treatment left him with epilepsy and chronic fatigue, forcing him to abandon clinical practice.

After Farrimond left medical practice, he lectured in Health Studies at Wiltshire College, tutored food science at the University of Cambridge, and conducted research on brain tumours.

Farrimond believed there was a relative lack of funding, and scientific and media attention, devoted to brain tumour research. Consequently, he became a brain tumour research advisor, advocate, and fundraiser for the International Brain Tumour Alliance and the medical charity Brain Tumour Research. As a lobbyist, he pushed for improved brain tumour research funding in Parliament.

After clinical practice, Farrimond started a science-communication blog that led to a media career. He became a regular life sciences communicator on television, radio, and print in the years after his diagnosis. From 2017, he was the recurring food scientist on BBC Television's Inside the Factory, hosted a weekly life science program on BBC Radio, and made regular contributions in NHS documentaries, The Independent, The Guardian, the Daily Mail, BBC Science Focus, and New Scientist.

He secured funding from the Wellcome Trust for the start of the Guru Magazine, and contributed to Simon Sinek's Optimism Company.

Farrimond was a Sunday Times international best-selling author. His "Science of" series of books has been translated into 19 languages and has sold more than one million copies worldwide.

== Personal life and death ==
In 2007, Farrimond, a devout Christian, married Grace Farrimond, a nurse-turned-florist whom he met while in university. They settled in Trowbridge, Wiltshire, with their dog, Winston. His older sister, Laura, is a science teacher. Farrimond was described by those who knew him as quiet, humble, and caring.

In an interview with podcaster Andrew Gold, Farrimond stated that he was monitored for the recurrence of his brain tumour every six months. However, for several years his regular doctors failed to notice the growth of—what progressed to be—an aggressive form of astrocytoma known as grade III anaplastic astrocytoma. A stand-in physician, who took the time to compare his latest brain scans with those from years past, spotted the error.

Farrimond conducted an interview about his life, faith, and legacy the week prior to his death at Dorothy House Hospice Care. He died on 17 May 2025, at the age of 43. A celebration of life and natural burial was held at Leafy Lane Natural Burial Woods, a sustainable cemetery, where Farrimond was buried next to an oak tree.

== Bibliography ==
=== Books ===
- The Science of Cooking (2017)
- The Science of Spice (2018)
- The Science of Living (2020)
- The Science of Gardening (2023)
- The Science of Flavour (2025)

=== Selected papers ===
- Voisin MR, Oliver K, Farrimond S, et al. Brain tumors and COVID-19: the patient and caregiver experience. Neuro-Oncology Advances. 2020;2(1):vdaa104.
- Goddard E, Ashkan K, Farrimond S, Bunnage M, Treasure J. Right frontal lobe glioma presenting as anorexia nervosa: Further evidence implicating dorsal anterior cingulate as an area of dysfunction. Intl J Eating Disorders. 2013;46(2):189-192.
