= Lichk, Syunik =

Lichk Լիճք
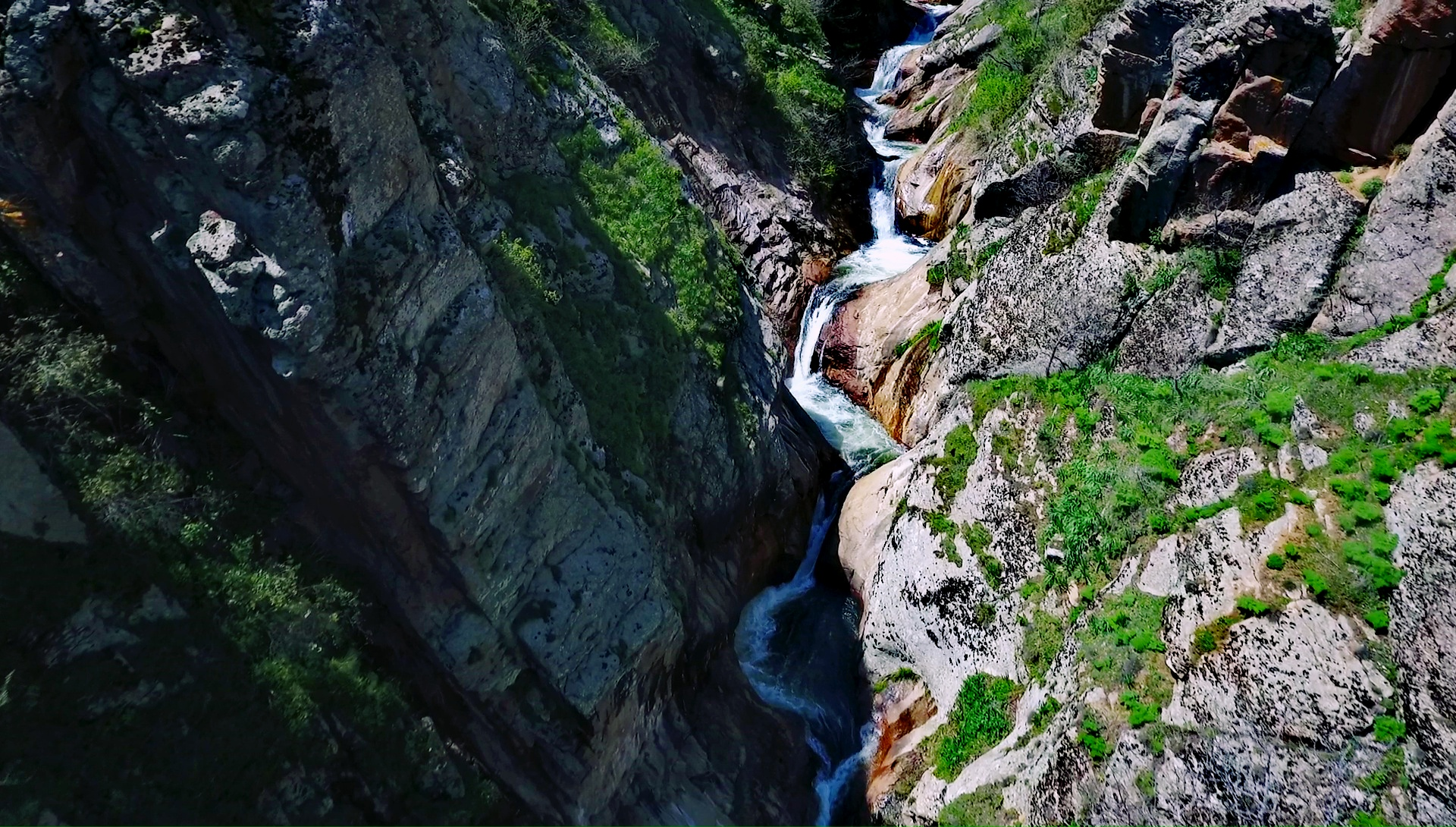
- Scenery around Lichk

- Location within Armenia Location within Syunik Province
- Coordinates: 39°03′22″N 46°10′27″E
- Country: Armenia
- Province: Syunik
- Municipality: Meghri

Area
  - Total: 34.92 km^{2} (13.48 sq mi)

Population (2011)
  - Total: 161
  - Density: 4.61/km^{2} (11.9/sq mi)
- Time zone: UTC+4 (AMT)

Lichk (Armenian: Լիճք) is a village in the Meghri Municipality of the Syunik Province in Armenia.

== Demographics ==
The Statistical Committee of Armenia reported its population as 161 in 2011, down from 201 at the 2001 census.

== Nature ==
The vicinity of the village was designated as a Prime Butterfly Area by the Butterfly Conservation Armenia organization, due to rich species diversity that includes number of rare and endangered butterflies, such as Pyrgus alveus, Pyrgus jupei, Parnassius mnemosyne, Parnassius apollo, Pieris bryoniae, Colias thisoa, Erebia graucasica, Satyrus effendi, Boloria caucasica, Phengaris arion, Eumedonia eumedon, Polyommatus dorylas, Polyommatus damon, and Polyommatus altivagans.

== Gallery ==
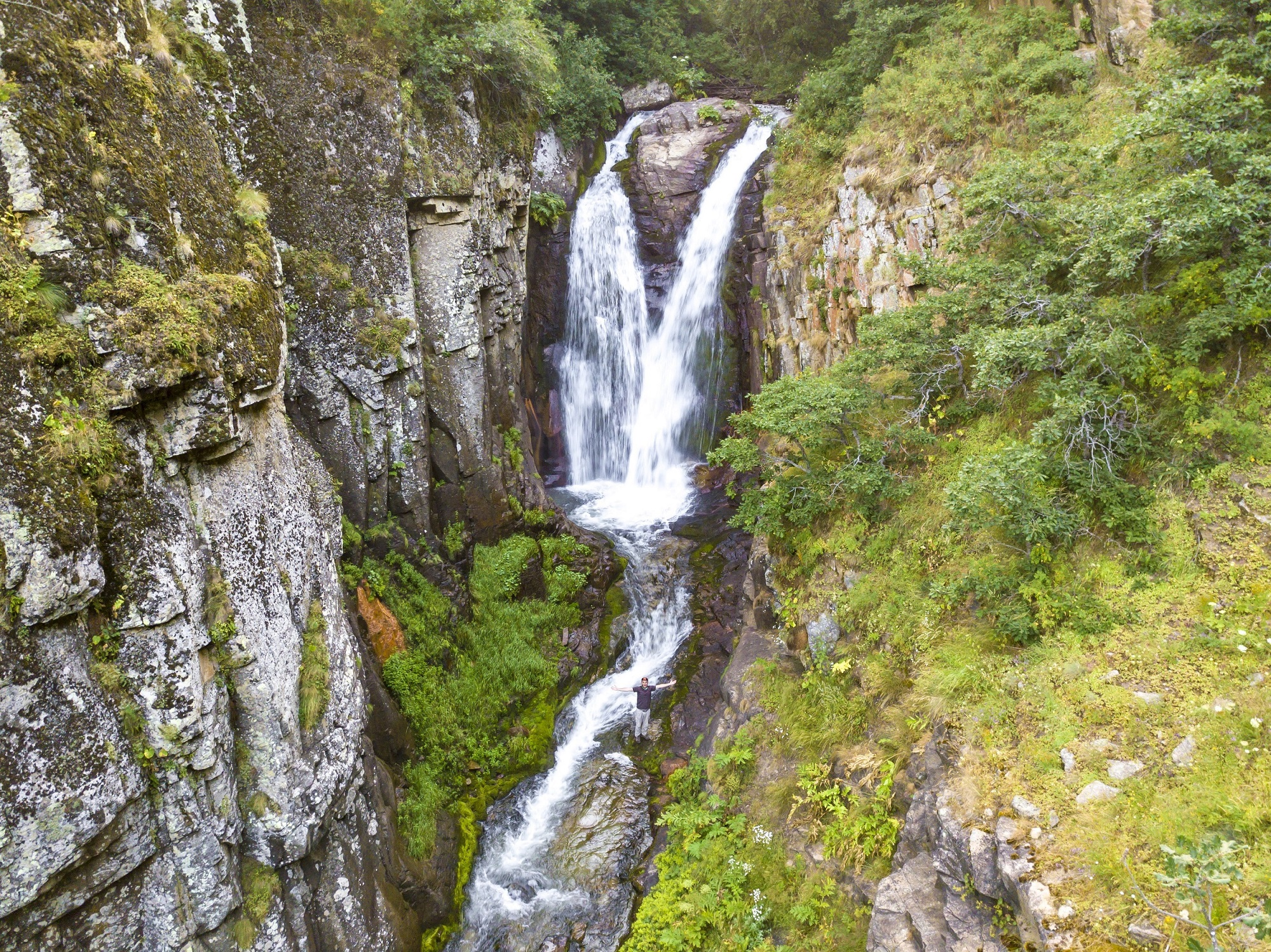
Waterfall in Lichk

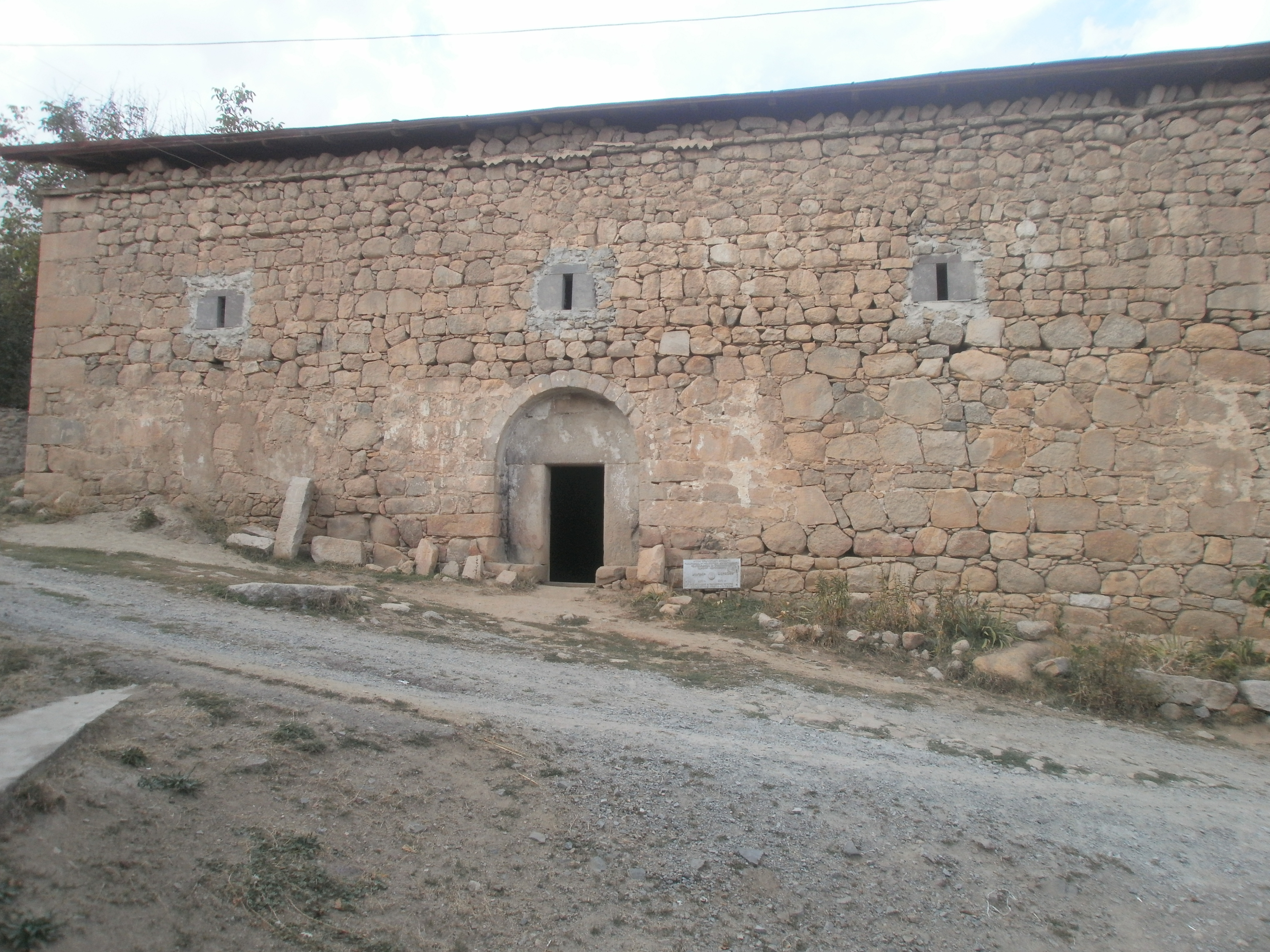
Surb Karapet church in Lichk

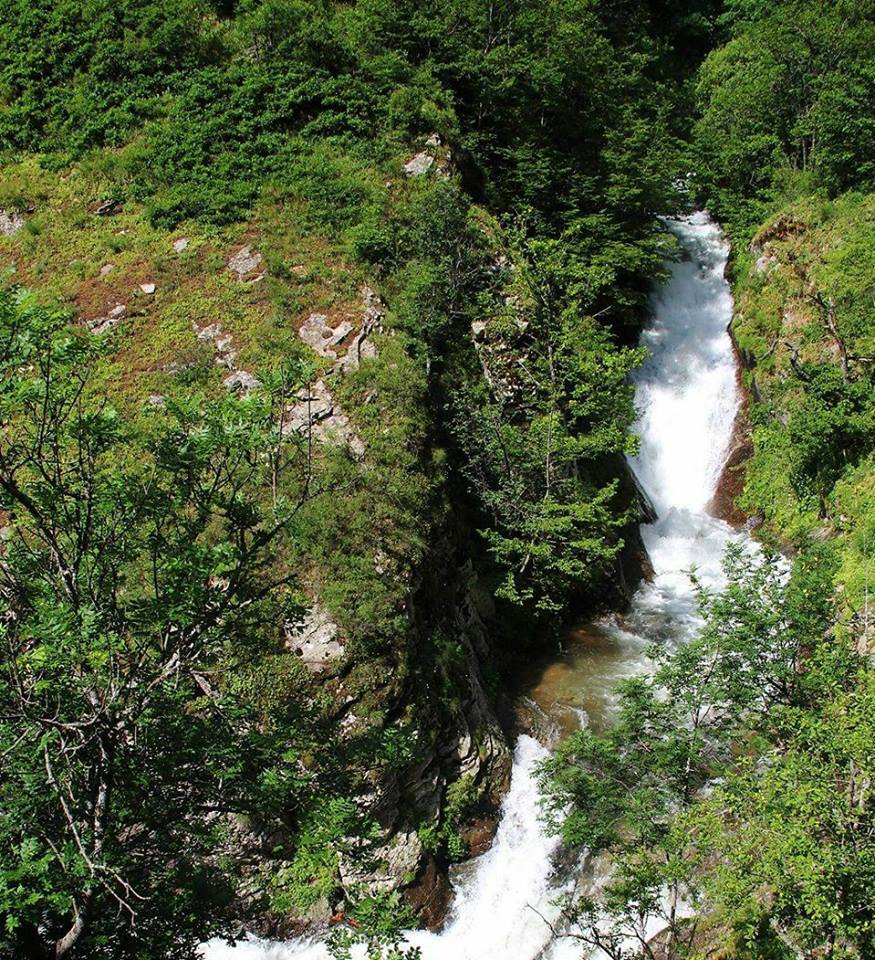
Waterfall in Lichk

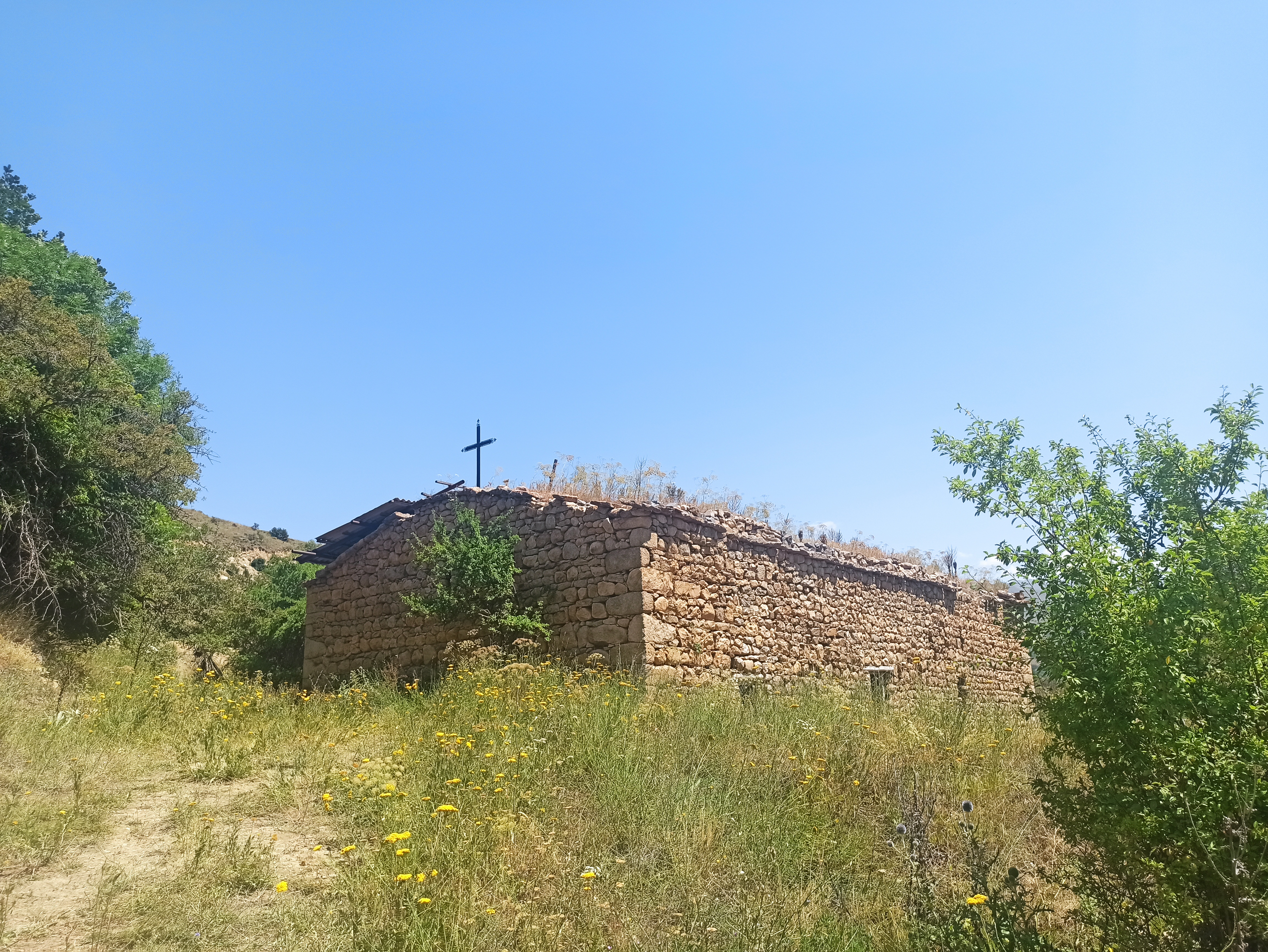
Zvaravank church in Lichk

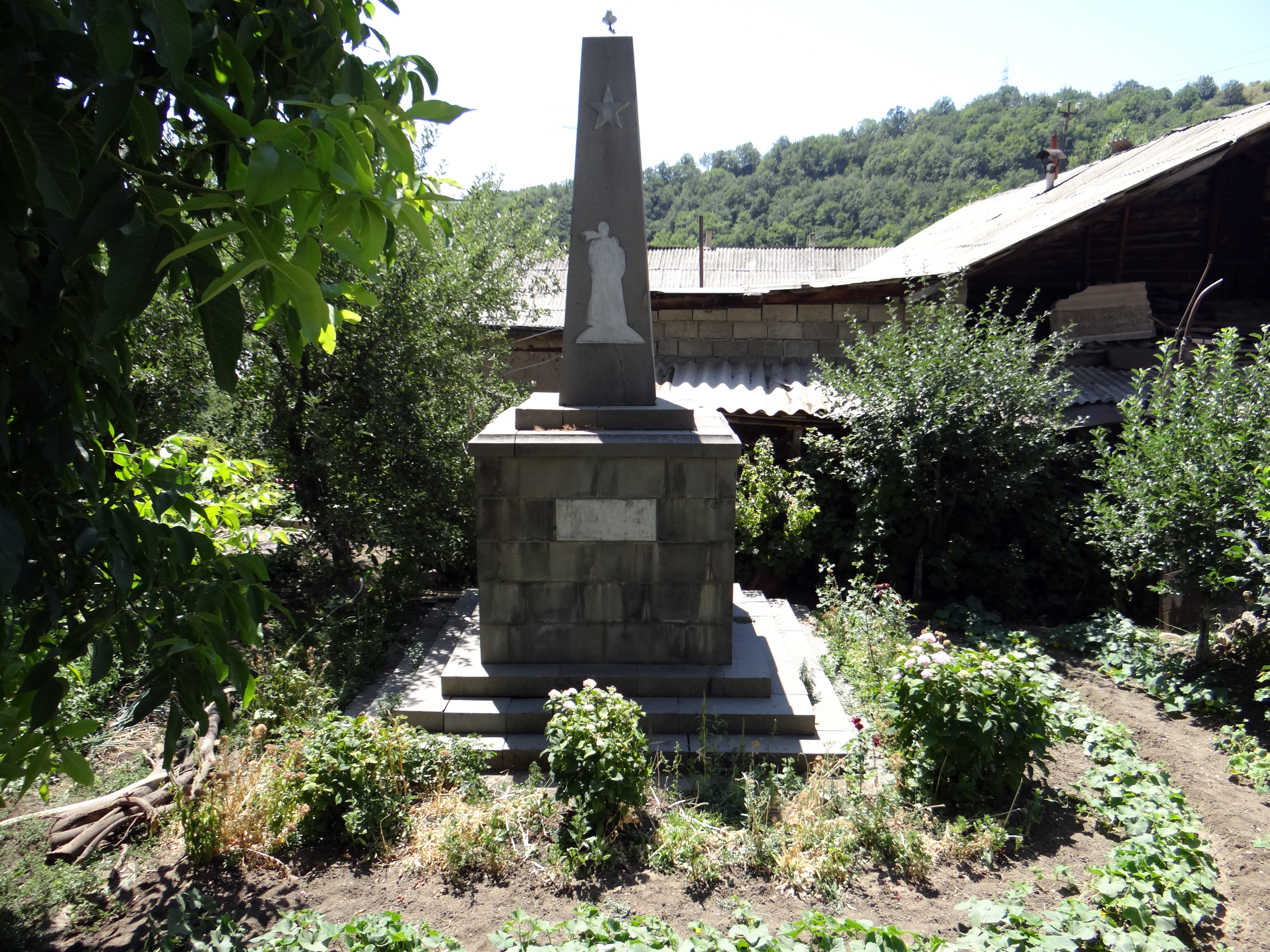
WWII monument in Lichk
