= Satyrus effendi =

Scientific classification
- Kingdom: Animalia
- Phylum: Arthropoda
- Class: Insecta
- Order: Lepidoptera
- Family: Nymphalidae
- Genus: Satyrus
- Species: S. effendi

Binomial name
- Satyrus effendi Nekrutenko, 1989

Species of butterfly

Satyrus effendi is a butterfly of the family Nymphalidae. It is found in the southern Zangezur Mountains (including both the Armenian and Nakhichivan sides). It inhabits sub-alpine grasslands, occupying stony slopes at 2500–3000 meters above sea level. The flight period is from mid-July to mid-August. The range of Satyrus effendi is covered by the Lichk Prime Butterfly Area, that is included in the Zangezur Biosphere Complex.

The butterfly was discovered by Ukrainian lepidopterist Yuri Nekrutenko in 1989. He named it after Rustam Effendi, a renowned Azerbaijani lepidopterist and his close friend.

== In media ==
The butterfly was featured in an episode of National Geographic's podcast Overheard at National Geographic, in which photographer Rena Effendi discusses how it was named for her father, a lepidopterist from Soviet Azerbaijan, as well as the difficulty in finding live specimens due to it being located entirely on the hostile border between warring Armenia and Azerbaijan.

In 2025, Rena Effendi released the documentary film Searching for Satyrus. It follows her journey to find this rare butterfly and uncover her father's fate, with their family history deeply intertwined with the ongoing Nagorno-Karabakh conflict.
