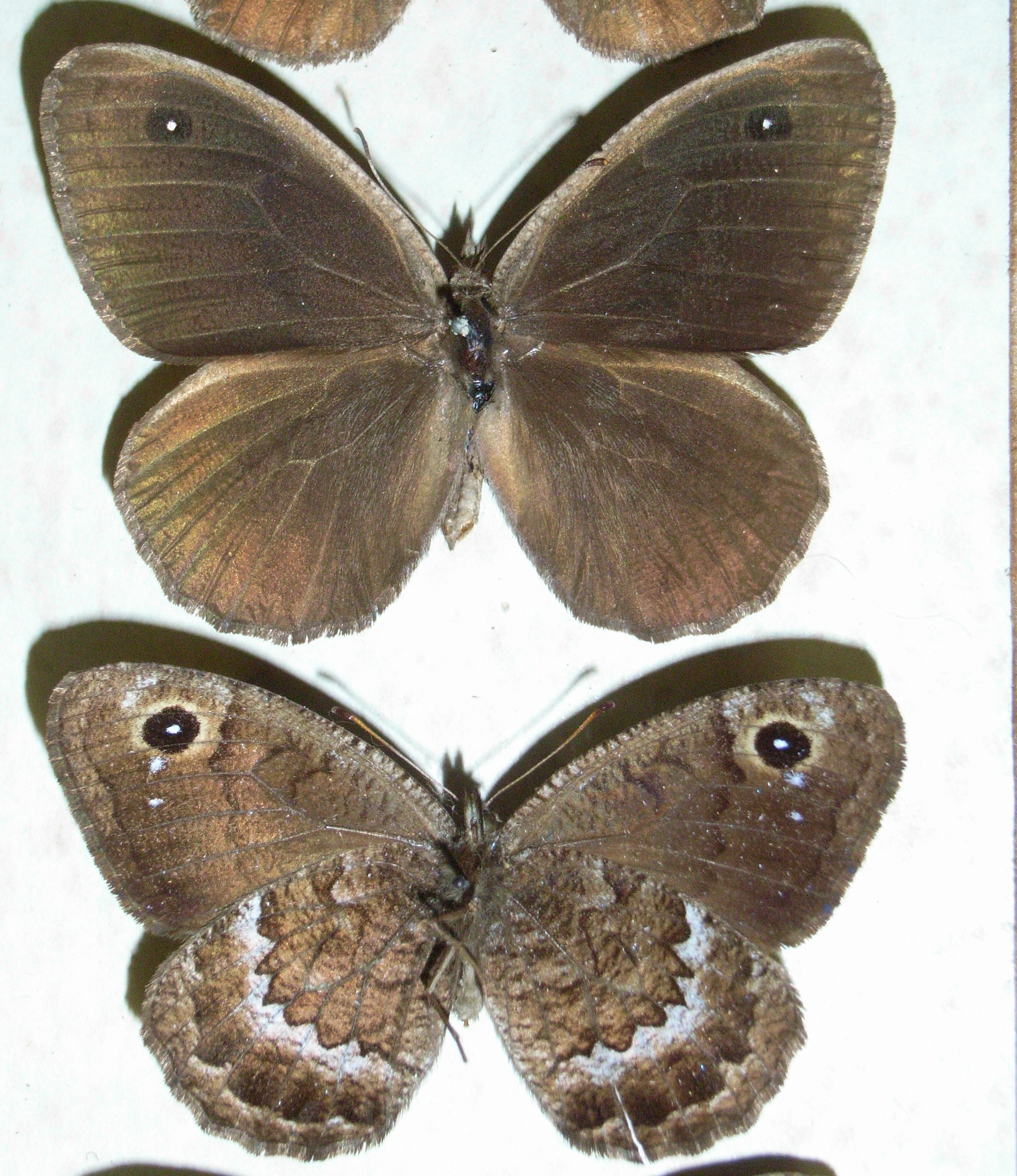
- Museum specimens
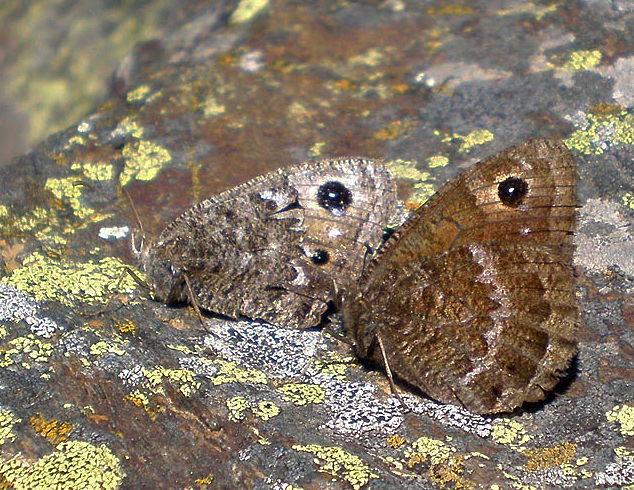
- Living specimens

Conservation status
- Least Concern (IUCN 3.1)

Scientific classification
- Kingdom: Animalia
- Phylum: Arthropoda
- Class: Insecta
- Order: Lepidoptera
- Family: Nymphalidae
- Genus: Satyrus
- Species: S. actaea

Binomial name
- Satyrus actaea (Esper, 1781)

Synonyms
- Papilio actaea Esper, 1781

= Satyrus actaea =

Species of butterfly

Satyrus actaea, the black satyr, is a butterfly of the family Nymphalidae. It is found in South-Western Europe, Asia Minor, Syria, Iran and Baluchistan (SW Pakistan).

The length of the forewings is 24 to 28 mm. Upperside of male black-brown, with a dark sheen in live specimens: the 2 ocelli of the forewing mostly represented only by the small bluish white pupils. In old specimens, with the ground-colour faded, the pupil is bordered with deep black. Between the ocelli of the forewing sometimes 2 minute white dots. The number of the ocelli may be enlarged or diminished as in all Satyrus, e. g. merula Schultz, ornata Schultz. In the female the distal band is indicated by a paler, sometimes yellowish brown tint, and the ocelli are considerably larger than in the male. Underside different in the various forms, with a distinctly defined distal ban, a dark dentate line in the cell and across the hindwing, and a somewhat irregular submarginal line.

The butterfly is on wing in July and August in one generation. The habitat is rocky places at 600 to 1,800 m. The larvae feed on various grasses (Brachypodium and Bromus sp. and sedges).
