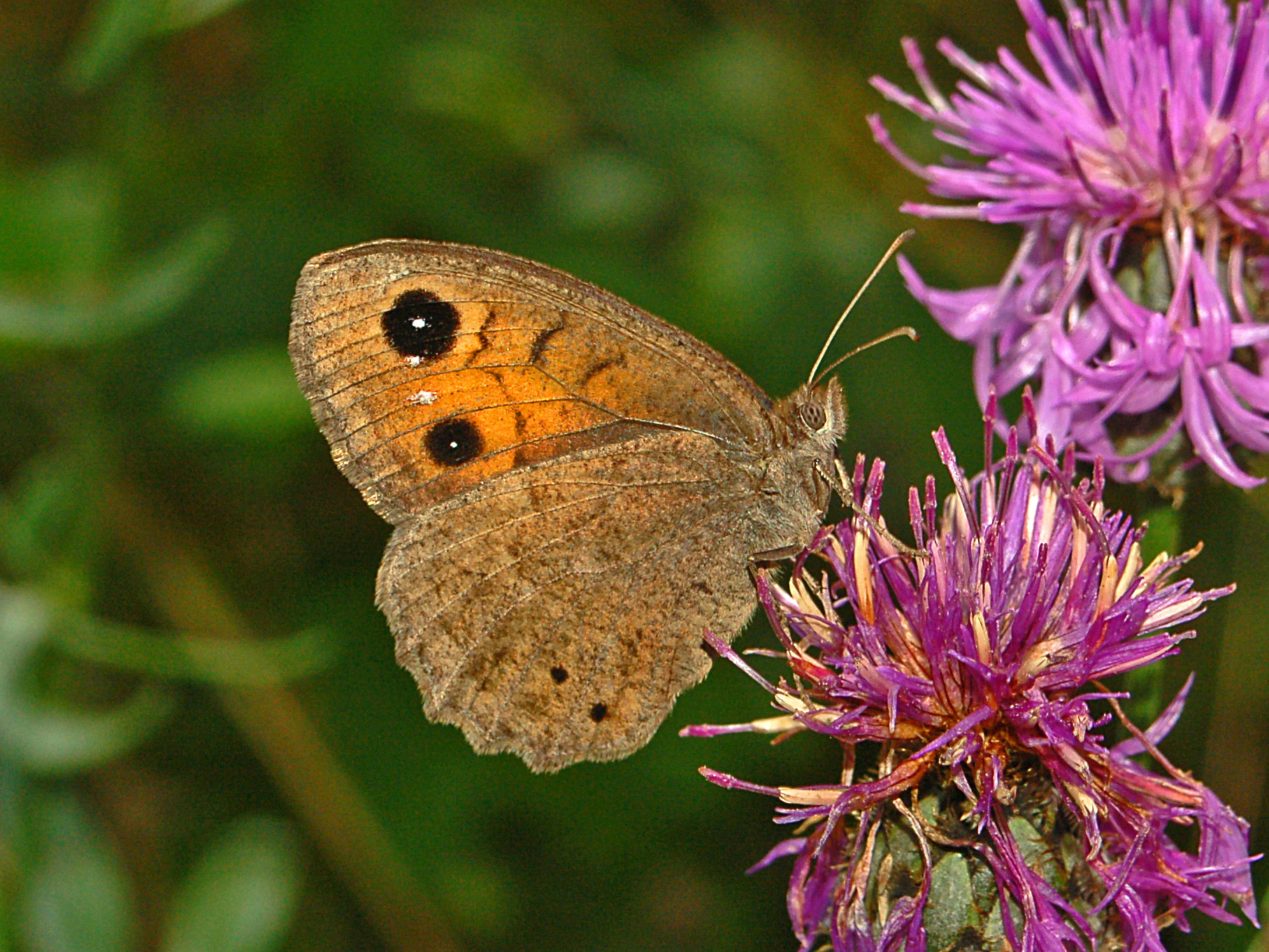
- Female, ventral view
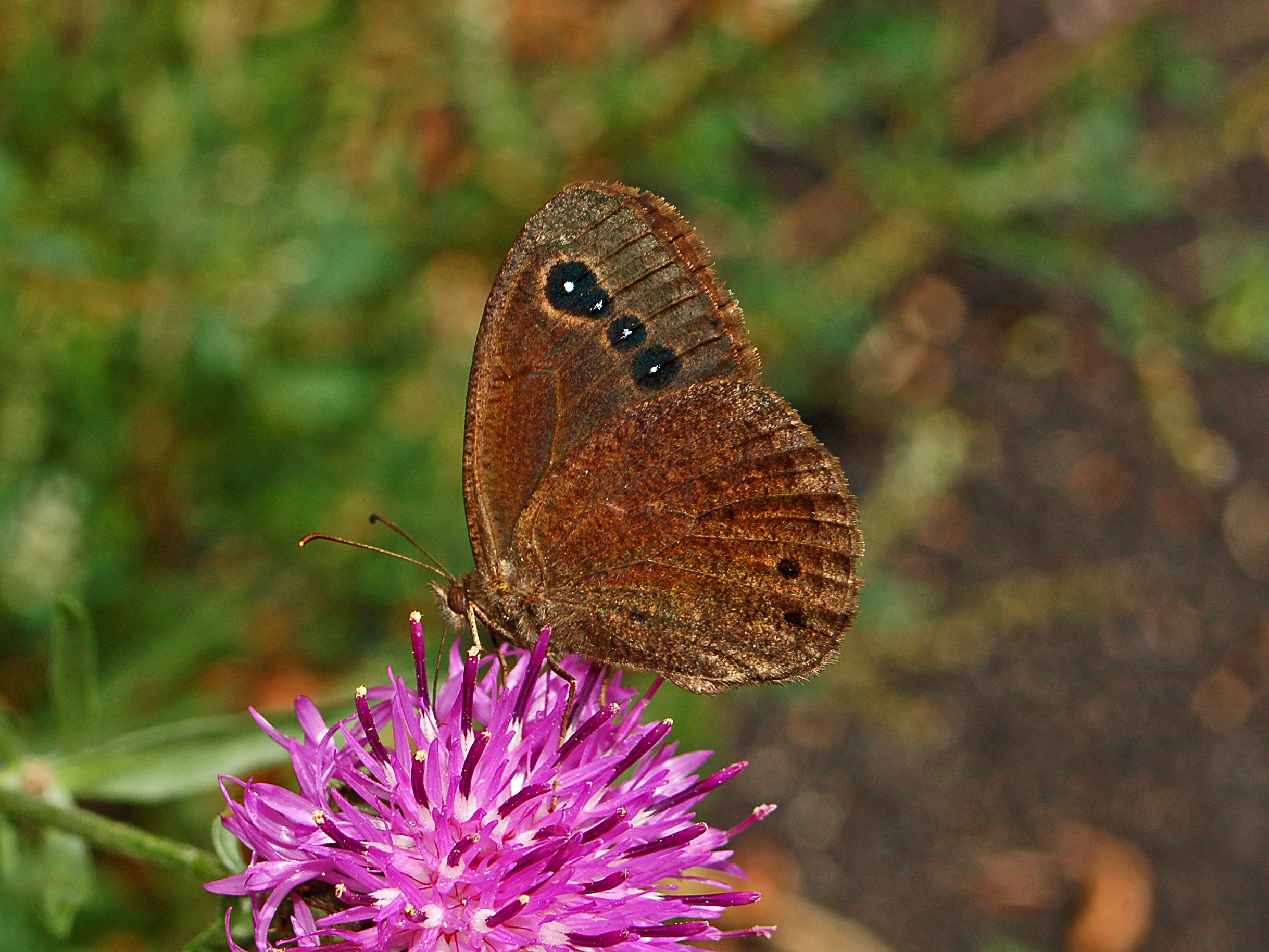
- Male, ventral view

Scientific classification
- Kingdom: Animalia
- Phylum: Arthropoda
- Class: Insecta
- Order: Lepidoptera
- Family: Nymphalidae
- Genus: Satyrus
- Species: S. ferula

Binomial name
- Satyrus ferula Fabricius, 1793

= Satyrus ferula =

Species of butterfly

Satyrus ferula, the great sooty satyr, is a butterfly of the family Nymphalidae.

== Description ==
The length of the forewings is 25 to 30 mm. This species shows an evident sexual dimorphism and the males are much more close to each other in appearance than the females. The wings of the males are usually dark brown on both surfaces, while in the female the wings are paler, with broad greyish bands on the undersides of the hindwings. On both sides of the forewings they have two-four black ocelli with white pupils, the first one much larger than the lower ones.

The flight period extends from June to early September and the butterflies lay their eggs on the grass. The larvae are recorded as feeding on various grasses, including Stipa, Festuca, Bromus erectus and Deschampsia caespitosa. (Higgins, Riley, 1982)

== Distribution ==
It is found in southern Europe, Morocco, Asia Minor, Iran, Kazakhstan, Central Asia, Transbaikal, western China and the Himalayas.

== Habitat ==
This species prefers grassy, rocky areas, calcareous grasslands, forest clearings at an elevation of 400–1,800 metres (1,300–5,900 ft) above sea level (up to 3000 m in North Africa).

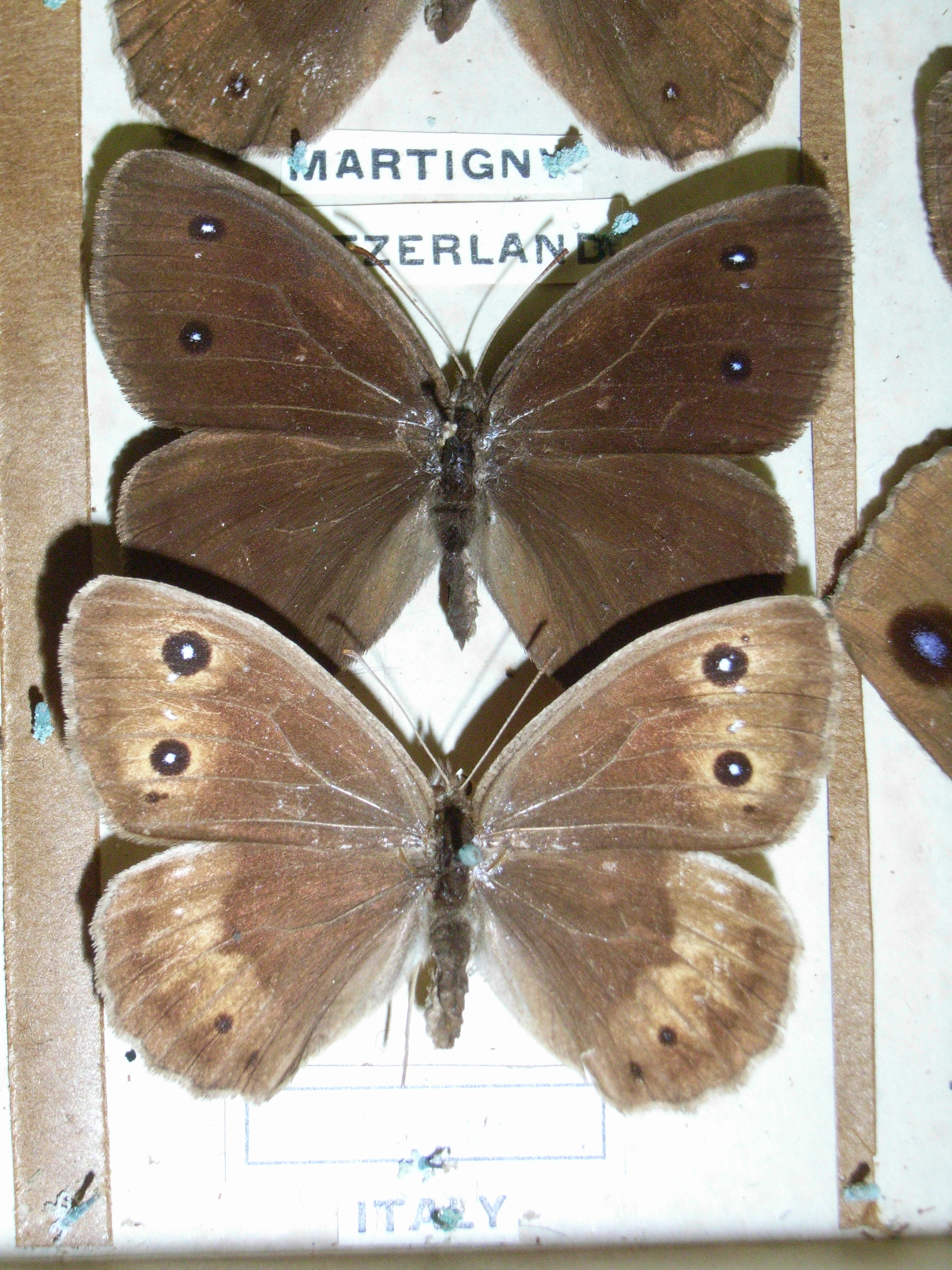
Mounted specimen

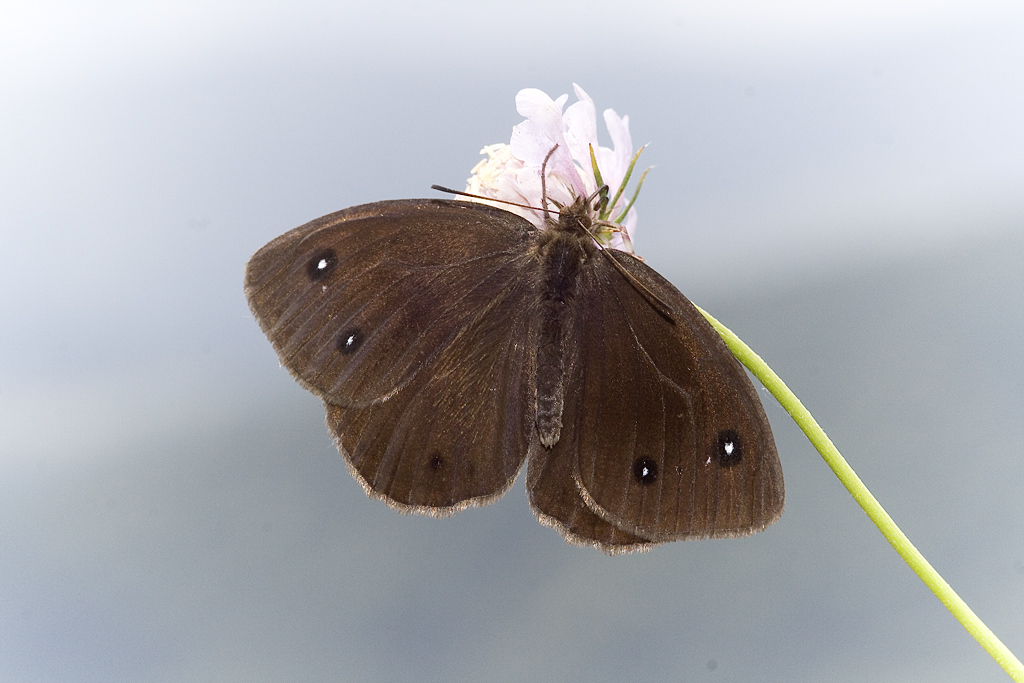
Dorsal view

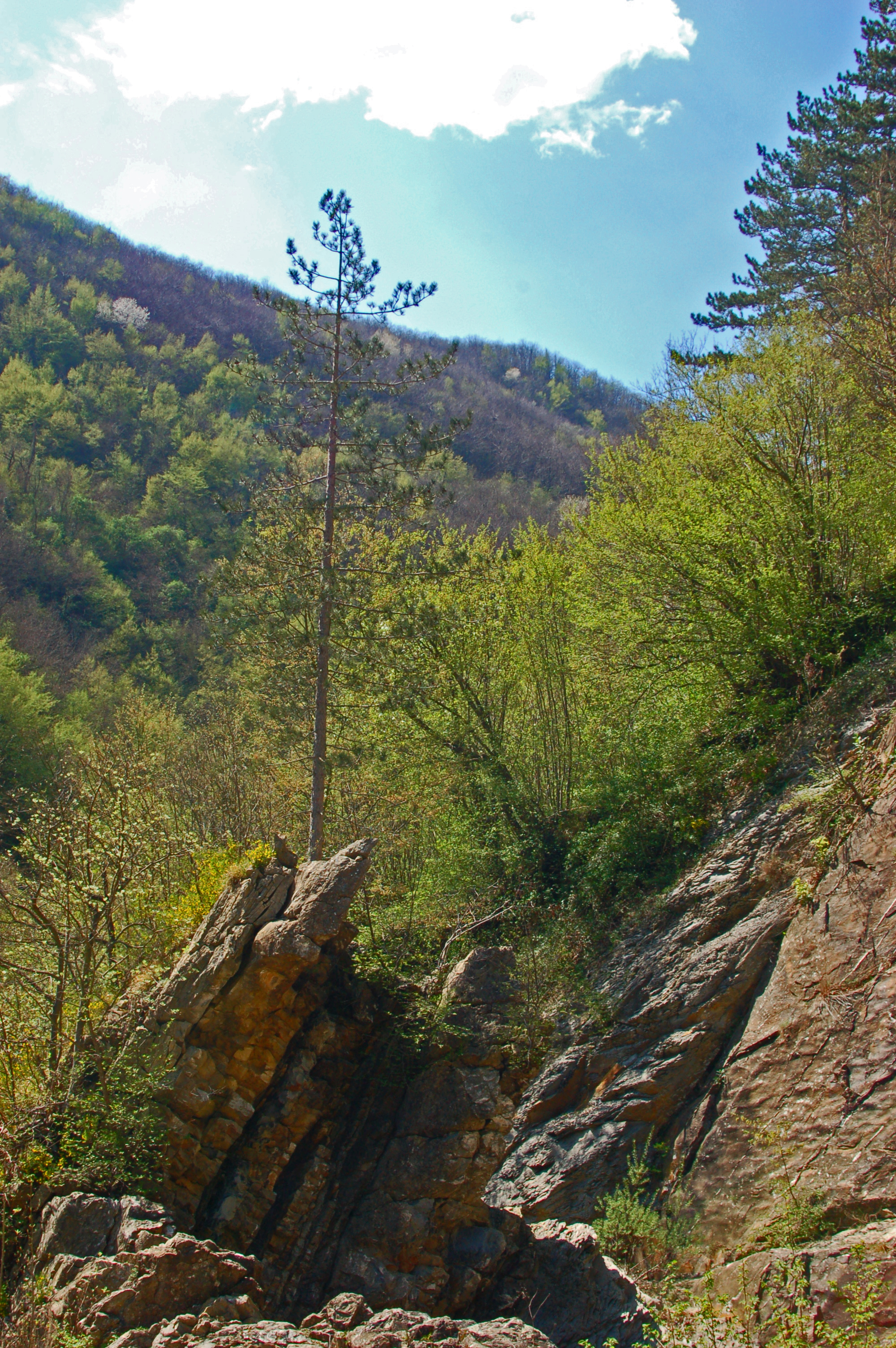
Habitat of Satyrus ferula (Val Noci, Genoa, Italy, about 500 m a.s.l.)
