= Ologies (podcast) =

Science podcast

Ologies with Alie Ward
- Genre: Science
- Language: English

Cast and voices
- Hosted by: Alie Ward

Music
- Theme music composed by: Nick Thorburn

Publication
- Original release: 2017–present
- Updates: Weekly

Related
- Website: www.alieward.com/ologies

Ologies with Alie Ward, also known as Ologies, is a weekly science podcast hosted by Alie Ward. Each episode, Ward interviews an expert from a distinct scientific field (somnology, bryology, philematology, etc.). Ologies is usually one of the top three science podcasts on Apple Podcasts. It is often cited by university newspapers and blogs as an example of how to make science communication more accessible and interesting.

When recording the episodes, Ward aims to avoid "expert sound bites" in favor of a more conversational tone, and she cuts in segments to explain concepts that her guests introduce.

== History ==
Ward first had the idea for the podcast in 2002. Further inspiration built when a visit to the Natural History Museum of Los Angeles County in 2013 led into a weekly volunteer shift and a career change into science communications for Ward. After building a following on Patreon, Ward launched Ologies in 2017. By February 2021, Ologies released more than 130 episodes and acquired more than 50 million downloads.

In July 2021, Ologies began releasing shortened versions of classic episodes called "Smologies." Edited specifically for classrooms, Smologies episodes run roughly 20 minutes, and do not have profanity.

== Awards and recognition ==
- 2019: Time Magazine named Ologies one of the 50 best podcasts of the year.
- 2022: the iHeartRadio Podcast Awards named Ologies “Best Science Podcast” and the Webby Awards honored Ward “Best Podcast Host.”
- 2023: awarded People's Voice Winner for Science & Education, Individual Episodes at the Webby Awards and named one of Town & Country's top 23 podcasts of 2023.
- 2024: won Best Science & Technology Podcast at The Shorty Awards and was listed under "Best Science Podcasts" in Wired's list of 60 best podcasts of 2024.
- 2025: the iHeartRadio Podcast Awards named Ologies “Best Science Podcast” and Time Magazine honored Ologies as one of "The 100 Best Podcasts of All Time."
- 2026: named both the Webby Winner and People's Voice Winner in the Science & Education Podcasts category of the Webby Awards.

== See also ==
- List of science podcasts
- List of popular science mass media outlets
