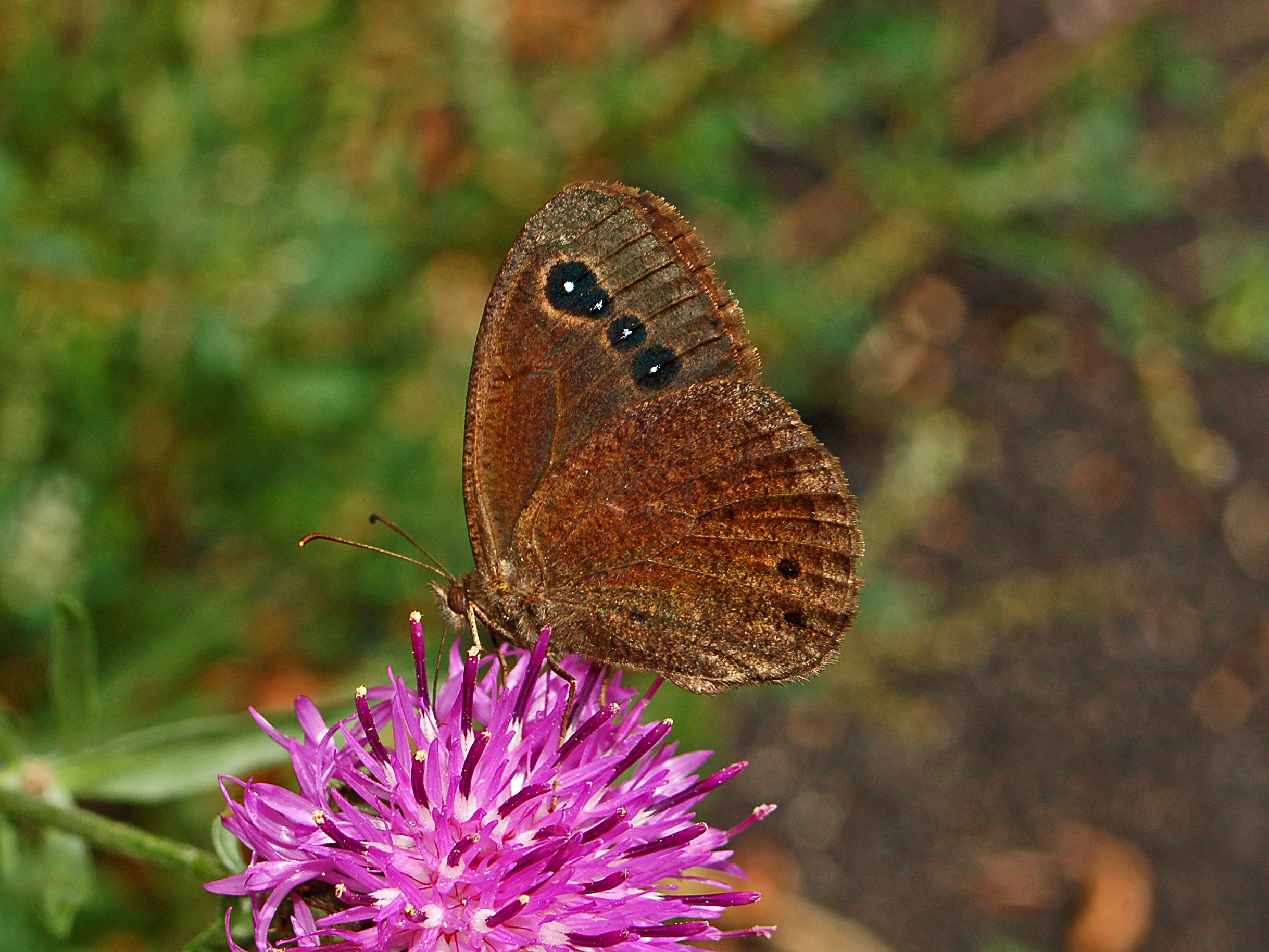
- Satyrus ferula

Scientific classification
- Kingdom: Animalia
- Phylum: Arthropoda
- Clade: Pancrustacea
- Class: Insecta
- Order: Lepidoptera
- Family: Nymphalidae
- Tribe: Satyrini
- Subtribe: Satyrina
- Genus: Satyrus; Latreille, 1810

= Satyrus (butterfly) =

Genus of butterflies

Satyrus is a genus of butterflies from the subfamily Satyrinae in the family Nymphalidae. The genus was erected by Pierre André Latreille in 1810. The species in the genus Satyrus occur in Europe and North Africa.

== Species ==
- Satyrus actaea (Esper, 1780)
- Satyrus amasinus Staudinger, 1861
- Satyrus cordulina Staudinger in Lang, 1884 (=Satyrus orphei Schchetkin, 1985 per Korb, 2016).
- Satyrus daubi Gross & Ebert, 1975
- Satyrus effendi Nekrutenko, 1989
- Satyrus favonius Staudinger, 1892
- Satyrus ferula (Fabricius, 1793)
- Satyrus iranica Schwingenschuss, 1939
- Satyrus nana Staudinger, 1886
- Satyrus pimpla C. Felder & R. Felder, 1867
- Satyrus parthica Lederer, 1869
- Satyrus shachdara Stshetkin, 1986
- Satyrus stheno Grum-Grshimailo, 1887
- Satyrus virbius Herrich-Schäffer, 1843
