= Roy Hamilton (physician) =

American neurologist and academic

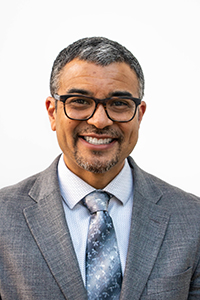
- Born: May 14, 1973 (age 53)
- Education: Harvard University, Massachusetts Institute of Technology (MIT)
- Known for: Neurology, Cognitive and behavioral neurology, Noninvasive brain stimulation, Neuromodulation
- Awards: American Academy of Neurology (AAN) Foundation Norman Geschwind Prize, 2015 Leonard Berwick Memorial Teaching Award, AAN Changemaker Award
- Scientific career
- Fields: Neurology
- Workplaces: University of Pennsylvania

Roy Hamilton (born May 14, 1973) is an American neurologist, professor in the departments of Neurology, Psychiatry, and Physical Medicine and Rehabilitation at University of Pennsylvania (Penn). He is the Director of Penn's Laboratory for Cognition and Neural Stimulation (LCNS), and launched the Brain Stimulation, Translation, Innovation, and Modulation Center (brainSTIM) at the University of Pennsylvania in 2020. He currently serves as the Chair-Elect of the Faculty Senate of the University of Pennsylvania.

== Background ==
Hamilton obtained his bachelor's degree in psychology from Harvard University in 1995, and obtained his MD and a master's degree in Health Sciences Technology from Harvard Medical School and Massachusetts Institute of Technology (MIT) in 2001. He completed residency training in Neurology at the University of Pennsylvania in 2005, and pursued a fellowship in Cognitive and Behavioral Neurology at the same institution. He was appointed to the faculty of Penn's Department of Neurology in 2009.

Hamilton is a board certified neurologist and practicing clinician at the University of Pennsylvania.

== Research interests and work ==
Hamilton has explored a variety of topics, including plastic changes that occur in the brains of blind individuals, mechanisms of neural recovery in patients who have suffered from strokes, and neuromodulation as a potential tool for enhancing human cognition

The central focus of his research revolves around using noninvasive electrical and magnetic brain stimulation to explore the characteristics and limits of functional plasticity in the intact and injured human brain.

As director of Penn's Laboratory for Cognition and Neural Stimulation, Hamilton leads a team of scientists and clinicians to employ a combination of behavioral measures, advanced neuroimaging, and brain stimulation to investigate the neural basis of cognition, develop and implement therapies for neurological disorders, and to reveal critical behaviorally relevant circuit and network properties of the human brain.

== Professional service and honors ==
Hamilton has been widely recognized for his contributions to the fields of behavioral neurology, cognitive neuroscience and neuromodulation. He was the recipient of the American Academy of Neurology Foundation's Norman Geschwind Prize in Behavioral Neurology, and has served as both the Chair of the AAN Behavioral Neurology Section and the President of the Society for Behavioral and Cognitive Neurology. He serves on the editorial boards of the journals Restorative Neurology and Neuroscience, Cognitive and Behavioral Neurology, and Neurobiology of Language. He is a trustee of the McKnight Brain Research Foundation, the only private foundation devoted exclusively to healthy cognitive aging brain. He has been recognized as one of "1,000 inspiring Black scientists in America" by CellPress and was a recipient of the inaugural Chan Zuckerberg Initiative Science Diversity Leadership Award.

In addition to his scientific engagement, Hamilton has held numerous leadership roles related to diversity, equity, and inclusion in academic medicine and neurology. He led the University of Pennsylvania's Educational Pipeline Program, an education and mentorship program for underserved, mostly African-American high school students in West Philadelphia from 2003 to 2012. From 2012 to 2022, he has served as the Assistant Dean for Diversity and Inclusion for medical students at the Perelman School of Medicine at the University of Pennsylvania (PSOM). In 2017, he was appointed as the inaugural Vice Chair for Diversity and Inclusion in Penn's Department of Neurology. Between 2019 and 2023, Hamilton served as one of two inaugural Associate Editors for Equity Diversity and Inclusion for the four academic journals published by the American Academy of Neurology (AAN): Neurology, Neurology Clinical Practice, Neurology Genetics, and Neurology Immunology and Neuroinflammation. Most recently, he served as the Vice Dean for Inclusion, Diversity, and Equity for PSOM from 2024 until the termination of positions related to diversity, equity, and inclusion at PSOM in the spring of 2025. He is the recipient of numerous honors for his work in fostering inclusive excellence in the field of medicine and equitable care for patients, including the AAN's inaugural Changemaker Award, and the American Neurological Association (ANA) Audrey Penn Lectureship.

== brainSTIM Center ==
Hamilton launched the Brain Science, Translation, Innovation, and Modulation Center (brainSTIM) at the University of Pennsylvania in 2020. Made up of a team of neuroscientists, neurologists, psychiatrists, psychologists, and engineers, the center has a cross-disciplinary approach which uses neuromodulation to investigate, remediate, and enhance human brain function.
