= The Travel Diaries Podcast =

Podcast

The Travel Diaries with Holly Rubenstein
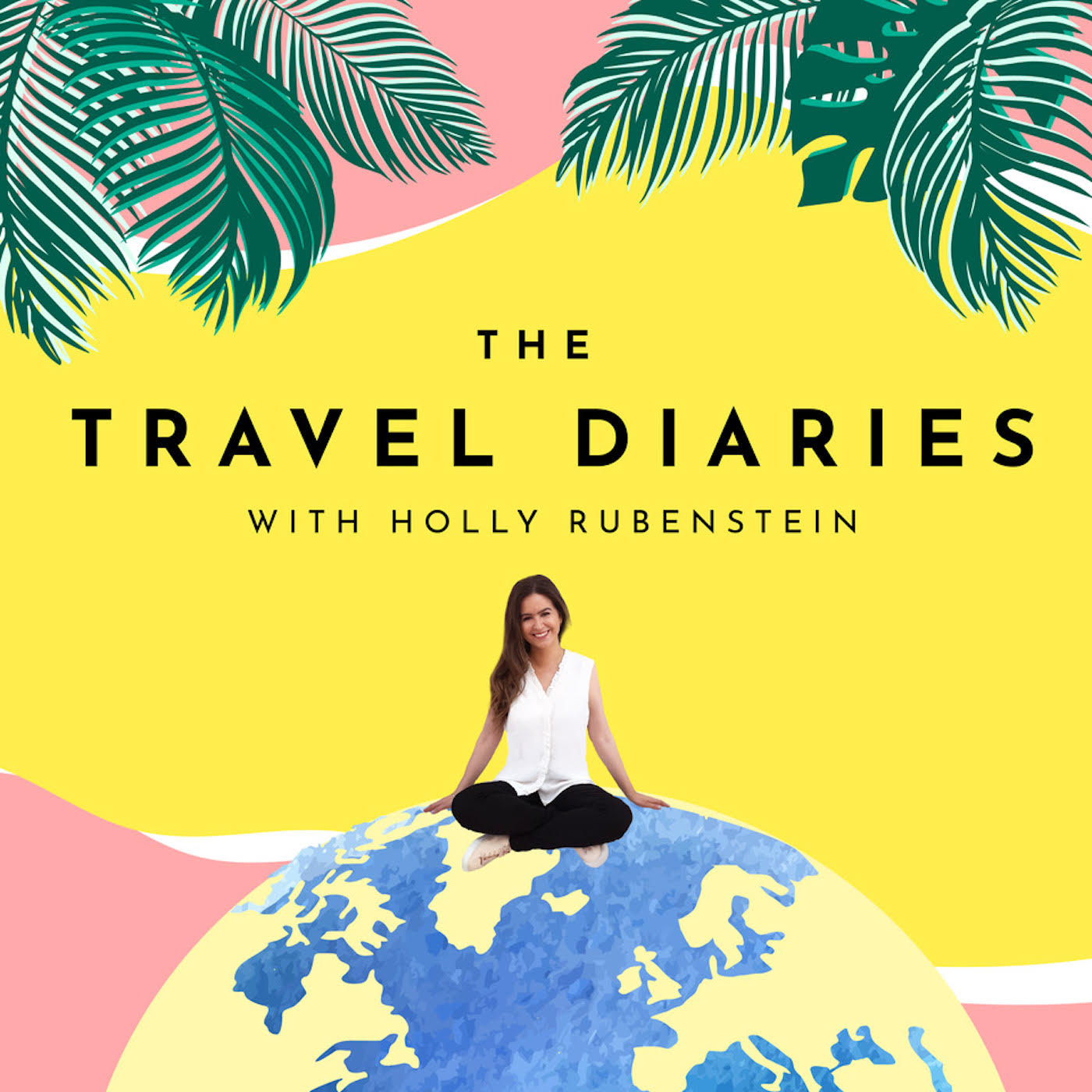
- Genre: Travel, Celebrity, Talk
- Format: Audio
- Country of origin: United Kingdom
- Language: English

Cast and voices
- Hosted by: Holly Rubenstein

Production
- Production: Holly Rubenstein
- Length: 30–60 mins

Publication
- Original release: July 2019

Related
- Website: thetraveldiariespodcast.com

The Travel Diaries is a podcast hosted by British-American journalist Holly Rubenstein.

== Premise ==
Each week Rubenstein interviews a different high-profile traveller about the seven "travel chapters" of their life. "Travel chapters" include their earliest childhood travel memory, the place where they learnt the most about themselves, their hidden gem and what's at the top of their travel bucket list.

== Episodes ==
The podcast has thus far released sixteen seasons with guests including Dame Joanna Lumley, Stanley Tucci, Sir Michael Palin, Hugh Bonneville, Jo Malone, Rick Stein and Sir Ranulph Fiennes. It is frequently cited as one of the "best travel podcasts to listen to".

== Host ==
Rubenstein was brought up in Surrey, England. She studied Social Anthropology at the London School of Economics and went on to work at Reuters and the BBC. She has said the show was in part in inspired by radio show Desert Island Discs, but with travel destinations, rather than music at its heart. She is married and has one daughter and one son.
