= Pathological lying =

Mental disorder

- Other names: Pseudologia fantastica, mythomania, compulsive lying
- Specialty: Psychiatry

Pathological lying, also known as pseudologia fantastica (Latin for "fantastic pseudology") or mythomania, is a chronic behavior characterized by the habitual or compulsive tendency to lie. It involves a pervasive pattern of intentionally making false statements with the aim to deceive others, sometimes for no clear or apparent reason, and even if the truth would be beneficial to the liar. People who engage in pathological lying often report being unaware of the motivations for their lies.

In psychology and psychiatry, there is an ongoing debate about whether pathological lying should be classified as a distinct disorder or viewed as a symptom of other underlying conditions. The lack of a widely agreed-upon description or diagnostic criteria for pathological lying has contributed to the controversy surrounding its definition. But efforts have been made to establish diagnostic criteria based on research and assessment data, aligning with the Diagnostic and Statistical Manual of Mental Disorders (DSMMD). Various theories have been proposed to explain the causes of pathological lying, including stress, an attempt to shift the locus of control to an internal one, and issues related to low self-esteem. Some researchers have suggested a biopsychosocial-developmental model to explain this concept. While theories have explored potential causes, the precise factors contributing to pathological lying have yet to be determined.

The phenomenon was first described in medical literature in 1890 by G. Stanley Hall and in 1891 by Anton Delbrück.

== Definition ==
Curtis and Hart (2020) defined pathological lying as "a persistent, pervasive, and often compulsive pattern of excessive lying behavior that leads to clinically significant impairment of functioning in social, occupational, or other areas; causes marked distress; poses a risk to the self or others; and occurs for longer than 6 months" (p. 63).

== Characteristics ==
Defining characteristics of pathological lying include:

- An internal motivation for the behavior cannot be readily discerned clinically: e.g., lying repeatedly to conceal illegal and disreputable acts such as extortion or habitual spousal battery have a clear motivation and would not be pathological even if longstanding.
- The stories are presented in a way that portrays the liar favorably. The liar "decorates their own person" by telling stories that present them as the hero or the victim. For example, they might be presented as being fantastically brave, as knowing or being related to many famous or powerful people, or as having great power, status, or wealth.

Some psychiatrists distinguish compulsive from pathological lying, while others consider them equivalent. Others deny the existence of compulsive lying altogether; this remains an area of considerable controversy.

== Diagnosis ==
Pathological lying is listed in the Diagnostic and Statistical Manual of Mental Disorders (DSMMD), although only as a symptom of other disorders such as antisocial, narcissistic, and histrionic personality disorders, not as a stand-alone diagnosis. The former ICD-10 disorder Haltlose personality disorder is strongly tied to pathological lying. Pathological lying is represented in both the DSM-5 and ICD-11 alternative models of personality disorder, which emphasise dimensions of personality dysfunction, rather than specific categorical disorders. "Deceitfulness", an aspect of the Antagonism domain, is a trait encompassing pathological lying in the DSM-5's model, while the current ICD-11 trait domain of Dissociality (analogous to DSM-5 Antagonism) holds pathological lying to be a behavioural expression of the Lack of Empathy facet. Pathological liars do not show these antisocial behaviors; they may lie merely because they think their life is not interesting enough.

== Neurobiology ==
Pathological lying shows a complex relationship with brain function. Compulsive lying has been reported in multiple neurological disorders, including early lesions of the prefrontal cortex, developmental disruption of white matter pathways connecting frontal cortex with temporal, limbic and parietal regions, disruptions to the functioning of the cingulate cortex, and a putative phenocopy of behavioural variant frontotemporal dementia. Taken together, these findings implicate dysfunction in the prefrontal and cingulate cortices, both of which are implicated in lie-telling in healthy individuals – the former across various types of lying (different subregions handling different kinds) and the latter only in feigning ignorance. The mechanisms of how lesions to these structures induce lying are unknown, but it has been suggested that reduced affective theory of mind and loss of sociomoral affect may induce the desire to lie, while impaired inhibitory control may prevent the regulation of such urges.

Pathological lying, which begins early in development (e.g., as part of psychopathic personality rather than being acquired by brain injury or disease), appears to relate to increased prefrontal white matter and reduced prefrontal activation when telling lies, a significant finding given that prefrontal activation is normally increased during lie-telling. These findings, alongside data showing pathological liars are faster at generating and telling lies, have been taken to suggest that liars lack the cognitive control and socioaffective networks required for inhibiting truthful responses, monitoring behaviour and believability, and adjusting deceptions to fit changing facts may be more efficient in pathological liars.

== Psychopathy ==
Pathological lying is an item of the interpersonal facet of the Psychopathy Checklist-Revised (PCL-R), alongside superficial charm, grandiosity, and manipulativeness. It is endorsed where an individual lies and deceives so frequently that it is a defining or central characteristic of their interactions with others. Lying in such persons is described as both calculated and aimless, with deceiving others thought to have some intrinsic value to the individual. The lies are told with ease, even when the contradicting facts are readily assessable, and the person normally shows some pride in their ability to lie, and may even openly boast of it as a talent or gift. The PCL-R distinguishes pathological lying from manipulation, which it treats separately as the strategic use of deceit and misdirection for personal gain, often by exploiting or using someone.

== Pathological liars ==
Lying is the act of knowingly and intentionally or willfully making a false statement. Normal lies are defensive and told to avoid the consequences of truth-telling. They are often white lies that spare another's feelings, reflect a pro-social attitude, and make civilized human contact possible. Pathological lying can be described as a habituation of lying: someone consistently lies for no obvious personal gain.

There are many consequences of being a pathological liar. Due to a lack of trust, most pathological liars' relationships and friendships fail. If this continues, lying can become so severe as to cause legal problems, including, but not limited to, fraud.

== Epidemiology ==
The average age of onset is before adulthood. Individuals with the condition tend to have average verbal skills as opposed to performance abilities. Thirty percent of subjects had a chaotic home environment, where a parent or other family member had a mental disturbance. Its occurrence was found by the study to be equal in women and men. Forty percent of cases reported central nervous system abnormality such as epilepsy, abnormal EEG findings, ADHD, head trauma, or CNS infection.

== See also ==
- Child lying
- Compulsive behavior
- Confabulation
- Ganser syndrome
- Impostor syndrome
- Munchausen syndrome
- Psychological projection
