= List of travel podcasts =

The following is a list of travel podcasts.

== List ==
| Podcast | Year | Starring, Narrator(s), or Host(s) | Produced by | Ref |
|---|---|---|---|---|
| Not So Bon Voyage | 2019–2021 | Jules Hatfield and Christine Williams | Independent | |
| JUMP with Traveling Jackie | 2016–present | Jackie Nourse | Independent | |
| brb | 2019–2020 | Lizzy, Lily and Kristy | Independent | |
| Excess Baggage | 2021–present | Katrina and Marlina | Independent | |
| Escape Routes | 2020–present | Various | Condé Nast Traveller | |
| The Travel Diaries | 2019–present | Holly Rubenstein | Independent | |
| Talk with History | History Travel & Road Trips | 2021-present | Scott and Jenn of Walk with History | Independent | |
| Zero to Travel | | | | |
| Globetrotter Lounge | | | | |
| Israel Story | | | | |
| Abroad in Japan | | | | |
| Wild Ideas Worth Living | | | | |
| Skift | | | | |
| The Musafir Stories | | | | |
| The reDiscovery Project | | | | |
| No Shitting In The Toilet | | | | |
| Armchair Explorer | | | | |
| Let's Go Together | | | | |
| Chronicles Abroad | | | | |
| Travel with Rick Steves | | | | |
| Deviate with Rolf Potts | | | | |
| NYC Local Guides | | | | |
| Indie Travel Podcast | | | | |
| Chica Travel with Lelo | | | | |
| Final Boarding Call | | | | |
| Wild Times Podcast With Forrest Galante | | | | |
| Get Lost Podcast | | | | |
| Layovers | | | | |
| Music Planet: Road Trip | | | | |
| The Bike Show | | | | |
| The Bitter Southerner | | | | |
| The Earful Tower: Paris | 2016–present | Oliver Gee | Independent | |

== See also ==
- Travel literature
- Travel documentary
- Adventure travel
