= Guru Magazine =

Online crowd-sourced magazine

Guru Magazine was an online crowd-sourced magazine supported by the Wellcome Trust. and published by Guru Magazine Ltd. It was a bi-monthly popular science magazine published in DRM-free ePub, Adobe PDF and kindle formats. Guru Magazine was designed to be read on tablet devices, smartphones and eReaders to reduce publishing costs . and for environmental reasons.

The magazine was launched on 1 June 2011, and explores science topics and their relevance to everyday life. The magazine is distributed for free on the magazine's website. Dubbed a 'science lifestyle' periodical, it was founded by Dr Stuart Farrimond, communications professional Ben Veal and graphic designer Sarah Joy in Trowbridge, UK.

The magazine features crowd-sourced, original writing from scientists, journalists and students from around the world. Regular contributors are termed 'Gurus' and include South African broadcaster Daryl Illbury, Canadian personal trainer Matt Linsdell and Detroit-based Dr Kim Lacey.

== History and profile ==
Founder Dr Stuart Farrimond trained as a medical doctor before being diagnosed with a malignant brain tumour in 2008. Following surgery he developed epilepsy and was unable to continue in the medical profession He started a career in lecturing and science communication and described his medical background as the inspiration to communicate 'tricky concepts'. The magazine was launched following the apparent high readership of Dr Farrimond's science blog "Dr Stu’s Blog". Stuart Farrimond described the magazine's launch as an effort to "bridge the gap between popular science writing and lifestyle magazine journalism" and to give opportunities for new writers to get their work published.

Since the magazine's launch, two of Guru Magazine's contributors, Stuart Farrimond and James Lloyd were finalists in the Wellcome Trust Science Writing Prize 2011 (in association with the 'Guardian' and the 'Observer') and Stuart Farrimond was shortlisted for 'Individual contribution to Technology' Award in The SPARKies 2012 and 2013 for his efforts in developing Guru Magazine to bring science to the masses.

In September 2012, it was announced that Guru Magazine was awarded £12,000 for the funding of an interactive mobile application, allowing readers to access magazine content via Apple's Newsstand application and Google Play. The mobile app, offering an automatic free subscription facility, was released on 28 March 2013. Guru Magazine ceased publication in July 2018.

== Magazine Gurus ==
Via print, and audio podcasts, Guru Magazine regularly showcased the work of several experts in various specialty areas; many of whom were then able to launch their own successful science-related communication, publishing, and education careers thereafter.

Regular “Gurus” included:

- Dr. Stuart Farrimond (founder, editor, Science Guru)
- Ben Veal (Media Guru)
- Dr. James Lloyd (Physics Guru)
- Dr. Kim Lacey (Mind Guru)
- Dr. Jon Scott (Education Guru)
- Jon Crowe (Molecular Science Guru)
- Daryl Ilbury (Skeptic Guru)
- Ian Wildsmith (Design Guru)
- Matthew Linsdell (Fitness Guru)
- Dr. Artem Cheprasov (Animal Guru)
