= Excess Baggage (radio programme) =

BBC Radio 4 programme

Excess Baggage was a BBC Radio 4 travel programme that ran for 173 episodes from April 2000 to 2012. Broadcast on Saturday mornings from 10 to 10:30am, the programme had a magazine format, featuring travellers' tales, experiences and anecdotes. The presenters were John McCarthy, Sandi Toksvig and Arthur Smith. All episodes are available on BBC Sounds.

== See also ==
- List of travel podcasts
