= List of science podcasts =

The following is a list of science podcasts.

== List ==
Podcast	Year	Starring, Narrator(s), or Host(s)	Produced by	Ref
Ologies	2017–present	Alie Ward	Independent	
Sci_Burst	2022–present	Isabel Richards and Ella McCarthy	Independent	
Radiolab	2006–present	Jad Abumrad, Lulu Miller, and Latif Nasser	WNYC Studios	
Science History Podcast	2017–present	Dr. Frank Von Hippel	Independent	
Gastropod	2014–present	Cynthia Graber and Nicola Twilley	Independent	
StarTalk	2009–present	Neil deGrasse Tyson	Curved Light Productions	
Science Vs	2016–present	Wendy Zukerman	Spotify	
The Skeptics’ Guide to the Universe	2005–present	Steven Novella, Bob Novella, Jay Novella, Cara Santa Maria, and Evan Bernstein	SGU Productions	
Wow in the World	2017–present	Mindy Thomas and Guy Raz	Tinkercast and Wondery	
Endless Science				
The Naked Scientists	2005–present	Chris Smith	University of Cambridge	
Science Quickly	2023–present	Rachel Feltman	Scientific American	
Stuff You Should Know	2008–present	Josh and Chuck	iHeartRadio	
Hidden Brain	2015–present	Shankar Vedantam	Hidden Brain Media	
Inside Science	2015–present	Adam Rutherford	BBC Radio 4	
The Infinite Monkey Cage	2009–present	Brian Cox and Robin Ince	BBC Radio 4	
Science Weekly	2020–present	Madeleine Finlay	The Guardian	
This Podcast Will Kill You	2017–present	Erin Welsh and Erin Allmann Updyke	Exactly Right	
Story Collider	2012–present	Erin Barker	Story Collider, Inc.	
Brains On!	2013–present	Molly Bloom	Brains On Universe	
Science Friday	2021–present	Ira Flatow	WNYC Studios	
Invisibilia	2014–present	Kia Miakka Natisse and Yowei Shaw	NPR	
The Reality Check	2008–present	Darren McKee, Adam Gardner, Cristina Roach, and Pat	Independent	
Roots of Reality	2019–present	Ben Baumann	Independent	
Sawbones	2013–present	Sydnee McElroy and Justin McElroy	Maximum Fun	
Nature Podcast	2014–present		Springer Nature	
SciShow Tangents	2018–2025	Hank Green and panelists	Complexly	
The Body of Evidence	2015–present	Christopher Labos, Jonathan Jarry	Independent	
Let's Learn Everything!	2021– present	Ella Hubber, Tom Lum, Caroline Roper	Maximum Fun	
Mindscape	2018–present	Sean M. Carroll	Wondery	

== See also ==
- Science communication
- Science journalism
- Popular science
- Nature documentary
