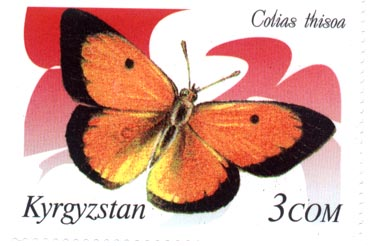

Scientific classification
- Kingdom: Animalia
- Phylum: Arthropoda
- Clade: Pancrustacea
- Class: Insecta
- Order: Lepidoptera
- Family: Pieridae
- Genus: Colias
- Species: C. thisoa

Binomial name
- Colias thisoa Ménétriés, 1832

Synonyms
- Colias eos Herrich-Schäffer, 1852

= Colias thisoa =

Species of butterfly

Colias thisoa is a butterfly in the family Pieridae. It is found in the mountains of the Caucasus, Transcaucasia, Turkey, Iran, central Asia, and southern Siberia. The habitat consists of humid mountain meadows in the forest belt.

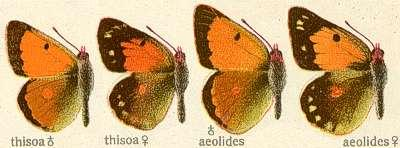
Illustration of males and females of ssp. thisoa and aeolides

The larvae feed on Astragalus species.

== Subspecies ==
The following subspecies are recognised:

- Colias thisoa thisoa (Caucasus Major)
- Colias thisoa strandiana Sheljuzhko, 1935 (Caucasus Minor, Armenian Highland)
- Colias thisoa shakuhensis Sheljuzhko, 1935 (Talysh, Kopet-Dagh)
- Colias thisoa aeolides Grum-Grshimailo, 1890 (northern and Inner Tian-Shan, Ghissar, Darvaz, Alai)
- Colias thisoa urumtsiensis Verity, 1909 (central Tian-Shan)
- Colias thisoa irtyschensis Lukhtanov, 1999 (south-western Altai)
- Colias thisoa nikolaevi Korshunov, 1998 (Alai, Kurai, Tyurguno Steppe)
