= Barry Gordon (neurologist) =

American behavioral neurologist

- Born: 1951 (age 74–75)
- Education: Pennsylvania State University; Thomas Jefferson University; Johns Hopkins University
- Scientific career
- Fields: Cognitive neurology, neuropsychology
- Workplaces: Johns Hopkins School of Medicine
- Thesis: Lexical access and lexical decision: mechanisms of frequency sensitivity (1981)

Barry Gordon (born 1951) is an American behavioral neurologist and cognitive neuroscientist. He is the inaugural holder of the therapeutic cognitive neuroscience endowed professorship and a professor of neurology with a joint appointment in cognitive science at the Johns Hopkins School of Medicine.

== Life ==
Gordon was born in 1951. He completed a B.S. from the Pennsylvania State University. He earned an M.D. from the Thomas Jefferson University in 1973. He conducted a medical internship at the New York Hospital-Cornell Medical Center. In 1977, Gordon completed a neurology residency at the Johns Hopkins Hospital. He completed a M.A. and Ph.D. in psychology from the Johns Hopkins University after joining the department of neurology faculty. His 1981 dissertation was titled, Lexical access and lexical decision: mechanisms of frequency sensitivity.

Gordon is the inaugural holder of the therapeutic cognitive neuroscience endowed professorship and a professor of neurology with a joint appointment in cognitive science at the Johns Hopkins School of Medicine. After his son was diagnosed with non-verbal autism, Gordon researched late speech development and designed an intensive therapy program to help him learn to speak.

Gordon is a former president of the Behavioral Neurology Society. He is an elected member of the American Neurological Association and a fellow of the American Academy of Neurology and the American Psychological Association. Gordon is the editor-in-chief of Cognitive and Behavioral Neurology.

== Selected works ==
- Gordon, Barry (1995). Memory: Remembering and Forgetting in Everyday Life. Mastermedia. ISBN 978-1-57101-031-5.
- Gordon, Barry; Berger, Lisa (2003). Intelligent Memory: Improve the Memory that Makes You Smarter. Viking. ISBN 978-0-670-03240-2.
