= Child lying =

Deceptive behavior in children

Child lying refers to children displaying varying degrees of deceptive behavior in a social situation. Children have been observed lying as early as age 2 and their deceptive skills increase sharply as they mature into adolescence. Children who have advanced cognitive skills for their age have an increased tendency to begin lying at earlier ages. Children may lie for various reasons including, but not limited to, escaping punishment for not obeying a task (such as eating a cookie when told not to), through observation of their parents and peers, or lacking a comprehensive understanding of basic morality.

Well known psychologists such as Jean Piaget and Lawrence Kohlberg placed particular importance on the cognitive development of children. Moral reasoning is a function of increased cognitive abilities in the brain in conjunction with socialization within the established moral codes of a culture and society. Children's cognitive abilities increase as the brain develops and matures and gains more experience interacting with their surrounding environment. Research and experimentation has validated and expanded upon the premise of cognitive functioning maintaining a leading role as the mechanism that drives the fabric of human behavior.

== Background ==
=== Morality ===
Morality (from the Latin moralitas "manner, character, proper behavior") is the differentiation of intentions, decisions, and actions between those that are "good" (or right) and those that are "bad" (or wrong). The philosophy of morality is ethics. A moral code is a system of morality (according to a particular philosophy, religion, culture, etc.) and a moral is any one practice or teaching within a moral code. Morality may also be specifically synonymous with "goodness" or "rightness." Immorality is the active opposition to morality (i.e. opposition to that which is good or right), while amorality is variously defined as an unawareness of, indifference toward, or disbelief in any set of moral standards or principles.

=== What is a lie? ===
A lie is a false statement to a person or group made by another person or group who knows it is not the whole truth, intentionally. A fabrication is a lie told when someone submits a statement as truth without knowing for certain whether or not it actually is true. A half-truth is a deceptive statement that includes some element of truth. The statement might be partly true, the statement may be totally true but only part of the whole truth, or it may employ some deceptive element, such as improper punctuation, or double meaning, especially if the intent is to deceive, evade, blame, or misrepresent the truth. An honest lie (or confabulation) is defined by verbal statements or actions that inaccurately describe history, background, and present situations. Perjury is the act of lying or making verifiably false statements on a material matter under oath or affirmation in a court of law, or in any of various sworn statements in writing. White lies are minor lies which could be considered to be harmless, or even beneficial, in the long term.

=== Child development ===
Child development refers to the biological, psychological and emotional changes that occur in human beings between birth and the end of adolescence, as the individual progresses from dependency to increasing autonomy. It is a continuous process, has a predictable sequence yet having a unique course for every child. It does not progress at the same rate and each stage is affected by the preceding types of development. Because these developmental changes may be strongly influenced by genetic factors and events during prenatal life, genetics and prenatal development are usually included as part of the study of child development. Related terms include developmental psychology, referring to development throughout the lifespan, and pediatrics, the branch of medicine relating to the care of children. Developmental change may occur as a result of genetically-controlled processes, or as a result of environmental factors and learning, but most commonly involves an interaction between the two. It may also occur as a result of human nature and our ability to learn from our environment.

== Experiments ==
=== Evans and Lee ===
==== Apparatus and methods ====
Evans and Lee investigated the importance of lying in 2- to 3-year-old children. This was the first experiment to examine the development of a child's early spontaneous verbal deceptive behaviors and how their cognitive skills relate. Forty-one 2-year-olds and twenty-four 3-year-olds participated in the experiment. In this experiment, the children performed tasks that tested their cognitive abilities for 5 different executive functioning skills. For every correct task the children performed, they would receive a point.

- A verbal ability measure was created for the parents of the children. The parents were given a list of simple words (e.g. dog, cat) and were asked if they had ever heard their child say those words.
- A reverse categorization trial, in which children were first asked to sort all of the big blocks into a big bucket and all of the little blocks into a small bucket. Then, twelve reverse categorization trials were performed where the child was asked to sort the big blocks into the little bucket and the little blocks into the big bucket.
- A shape stroop trial, in which children were shown three different cards that each had a large and small image of a fruit on them. The experimenter then labeled each of the sizes of the fruits and asked the children to name each fruit. Then, the children were given three trials where the card showed two large fruits with a smaller fruit embedded in the center and the children were asked to point at the small fruit.
- A gift delay condition, in which the experimenter presented the children with a bag and told the children not to peek inside of it while they went to get a bow. There were hidden cameras set up to tape the children's reactions while the experimenter was away. After three minutes (or until the child had peeked into the bag) the experimenter came back into the room.
- A deception task, in which children were asked to play a guessing game where a toy was placed on a table behind them and the experimenter made a noise that was associated with the toy in some way and the children were asked to guess what the toy was. There were three toys that the children had to guess and after the children guessed the first two toys correctly, the experimenter told the children that the next toy was on the table and played the noise while they went and got a storybook that was in a toy box in front of the children. The noise that the experimenter played though was not related to this last toy, so there would be no possible way for the children to guess the toy correctly without peeking. While the experimenter had their back towards the children, a hidden camera was there to check if the children had peeked or not. After a minute of having their back to the children, the experimenter shut the toy box loudly to signify to the children that they were going to turn back around and came back to the table and uncovered the toy. In order to figure out if the children would tell the truth or lie about peeking at the toy, the experimenter asked, “While I was getting the book, did you turn around and peek at the toy?” The children who had peeked and admitted to their act were classified as confessors and the children who had peeked and lied about it were classified as lie tellers. Then when the experimenter asked what the toy was, if children said the name of the toy correctly, they were classified as revealers. If children pretended that they did not know what the toy was or guessed a different toy, they were classified as concealers.

==== Results ====
80% of the children peeked at the toy. Out of the children who had peeked in the experiment, 40% lied about having peeked. Out of the children who lied about having peeked at the toy, 76% of the children were revealers, 14% of the children were concealers, and the remaining 10% claimed they did not know what the toy was.

For the different tasks, children were given a point for each task they had completed correctly. The children's scores were then used at the end of the experiment to see if there was any relation to lie-telling and the children's executive functions. The children that completed more tasks correctly received higher scores and had higher executive functioning skills. It was shown that the majority of three-year-olds lied and only a quarter of two-year-olds lied. There was proportional relationship between higher executive functioning scores and an increased tendency for children to lie. The 3-year-old children received higher scores overall and lied more.

=== Talwar, Lee, Bala, and Lindsay ===
==== Apparatus and methods for experiment one ====
Talwar, Lee, Bala, and Lindsay performed two experiments. In the first experiment, 137 children between the ages of 3 and 11 (and for the most part, the children's parents) were used for the study. One child and one parent were brought into a room with a puppet, in which a "Do Not Touch" sign was displayed beside it. The parents (as instructed by the experimenters before entering the room and unbeknownst to the child) were told to pick up the puppet and exclaim "I have broken the puppet!" and point to the "Do Not Touch" sign. The parents were instructed to have the children lie for them by not letting the experimenters know that they had touched the puppet. After the child agreed not to tell on the parent, they were then asked a series of questions by the experimenter. There were three types of conditions for the question task:

- A parent absent condition, in which the parents left the room while the experimenter asked the questions.
- A parent present condition, in which the parents were in the room with their backs away from the child and the experimenter.
- A child absent condition, in which the child was not in the room when the parent broke the puppet, however the experimenter would return the child to the room and leave. The parent would then admit to the child what they had done and prompt the child to lie to the experimenter upon his return.

The children were asked two individual sets of questions. The first set focused primarily on the actual situation. They were asked if they had broken the puppet, if their parents had broken it, or if someone else came into the room and broke the puppet. A second experimenter asked a different set of questions that was more hypothetically based than the first set. Their questions were designed to simulate a court competence examination. The children were told a story and asked questions about it to determine their capacity to comprehend moral values. They were also given a hypothetical situation in which the child was told by their parents not to climb a tree. Hypothetically the child climbed the tree anyway and was asked if they would lie to their parents.

All of the children were told the definition of a "promise" and then asked to promise to tell the truth for the next set of questioning. The children were then asked the same questions they heard in the first set about the broken puppet. The children and parents were debriefed after the questions were finished.

==== Apparatus and methods for experiment two ====
The second experiment had 64 children between the ages of 3 and 11 (along with the children's parents) participate. The design of the second experiment was similar to the first but had noticeable modifications to the child absent condition. The question task now included a No Competence Examination condition for the second round of questioning. Some children in this condition would still have the competence exam and be promised to tell the truth, however some children would not have any prompt to tell the truth for the final round of questioning. Also, the puppet was now placed in a high area that the children could not reach. Only the parents could possibly break the puppet. When the examiner re-entered the room, he would tell the child that they would not be blamed for the puppet breaking because it was too high for the child to possibly reach.

The question task proceeded afterwards. For the No Competence Examination condition, the second experimenter repeated the same questions as in the first round. The children did not promise to tell the truth. The Competence Examination condition was the same as it was for the first experiment. The children and parents were debriefed after the questions were completed as in the first experiment.

==== Results ====
In experiment 1 for the first round of questioning, half of the children told the truth immediately when asked "What happened?" in the parent present and absent conditions. Only 22% of the children in the child absent condition told the truth at the first question (78% lied). When asked if their mom or dad had broken the puppet, 20% of the children in the parent absent condition lied for their parents, 33% of the children in the parent present condition lied, and 49% of the children in the child absent condition lied.

After the competence exam and the promise to tell the truth, the questions in the first round were asked again. For the final round of questioning, only 4% of the children in the parent present condition lied when asked "What happened?", 15% of the children in the parent present condition lied, however 40% of the children in the child absent condition lied again and broke their promise to tell the truth. When asked if their mom or dad had broken the puppet for the second time, 4% of the children in the parent present condition lied, 11% of the children in the parent absent condition lied, and 31% of the children in the child absent condition lied.

For the second experiment during the first round of questioning, 61% of all the children lied when initially asked "What happened?". When asked if their parents had broken the puppet, 37% of all the children lied for their parents.

For the final set of questions when the children were again asked "What happened?", 41% of the children in the No Competence Examination condition lied while 47% of the children in the Competence Examination condition lied. When asked if their parents had broken the puppet again, 34.4% of the children in the No Competence Examination lied and 25% of the children in the Competence Examination lied.

=== Talwar, Gordon, and Lee ===
==== Apparatus and methods ====
Talwar, Gordon, and Lee investigated whether children would lie to conceal their own transgressions. 172 children from ages 6 to 11 were left in a room alone with the answers to trivia questions. They were then tested to see if they would look at the answers and lie about it. A majority of the children lied, but when asked follow up questions, their initial lie did not match their secondary answers. The children in the experiment were 36 first-graders, 38 third-graders, and 42 fifth-graders totaling 116 children in the experimental condition. A control group consisted of 20 first-graders, 18 third-graders, and 19 fifth graders totaling 56 children.

The children were brought into a test room and told that they were going to play a trivia game. They were given multiple choice questions to answer. Each card with a question had the answer on the back side. For each correct answer, the child would receive a point and points would equal a prize. After two questions, the experimenter would step out of the room. The next question card is left laying out and hidden cameras would show if the child looked at the answer or not. After a brief period of time, the experimenter returned to the room and asked the child if they peeked at the card. They were then asked what the animal was on the back of the card and the ink color of the card. If the child answered correctly, they were then asked how they knew the answer. Many children who had looked at the card while the experimenter was absent answered with “I don’t know”. Some children not only lied about peeking at the card but also tried to conceal how they would know the answer, claiming to have known by mere chance. The control group followed a similar process, the only difference is when the experimenter left the children were informed that they could look at the back of the card. This was to ensure that the animal and ink color was easy to remember.

Not only was verbal answers taken into account, but also were nonverbal expressions. Facial expressions of the children were coded for each segment in the experiment and given positive and negative display scores.

==== Results ====
Every child in the control group peeked at the back of the trivia card and 50% of the children from the experimental group peeked at the card when the experimenter left. As age in the children increased, the percentage of peeking decreased. 78% of first graders, 45% of third graders, and 31% of fifth graders peeked. Of the 116 children in the experimental group, 54 of them denied that they looked at the answer on the back of the card. When asked the correct answer to the trivia question, 50% of the children that lied answered the question correctly. When asked what animal was on the back of the card, 56% of the lie tellers and 17.6% of the non-liars gave the correct answer.

For the nonverbal results, 100 children had valid facial scores. During the peeking segment, final trivia segment, and animal segment there was no significant difference between liars and non-liars. But during the explanation segment, there was significant difference in facial expression from liars to non-liars. Lie tellers displayed more negative facial expressions than children who did not lie.

The age peeking results confirmed that a child's inhibitory control increases as their age increases. 93% of the peeking children denied looking at the card. After the age of 3, the transgression remains strong throughout elementary school years. The facial expressions of liars and non-liars does not show a difference until the children are questioned about why they made a decision. It was found that older children were more likely to lie about knowing the correct answer. They knew if they answered the question correctly, the experimenter would know they looked at the back of the card.

== Significance ==
Jean Piaget believed that very young children had little or no conceptualization of morality. When children reached around the age of 6, they would have the necessary cognitive abilities to understand rules and morality at a moderately decent level. By around age 10, they would have a complete understanding of how morality works between themselves and their peers.

Lawrence Kohlberg, influenced by Piaget's work, created a series of stages in moral reasoning that he believed all people progress through. For his initial experimentation, however, he only used teenage boys as subjects, not using boys below the age of 10 (which is the age that Piaget said children reach the highest level of moral understanding).

Both Piaget and Kohlberg neglected to observe the significance of how younger children fit into the equation of moral development. The experiments of Kang Lee and others have led to differing conclusions that have shed new light on how the moral and cognitive development of young children works.

Children as young as age 2 can lie, which demonstrates:

- An increased ability to execute advanced cognitive functioning.
- An understanding of language and how to manipulate it to achieve a desired outcome.
- An understanding of basic morality.

The results of these experiments do not completely disagree with Piaget's findings and even complement and validate portions of his work. His theory of cognitive development states that children in the preoperational stage experience a variety of improvements in various cognitive abilities, including language, memory, and imagination. The abilities of language increase but in ways that Piaget did not consider, which include acquiring deception. It also requires some sort of imaginative ability to create lies on the spot and it takes a good control of executive functioning to recall segments of episodic memory to not only remember the original lie but then create other lies to cover for the previous ones.

The results also do not entirely disagree with Kohlberg's theories. The children that lied because their parents told them to displayed typical stage one reasoning that is described by Kohlberg's stages of moral development. Termed the Punishment and Obedience Orientation, children in this phase of moral development only accept what an authority says as "good" and anything that goes against this authority as "bad" because they may be punished if they go against the authority. However, not all of the children lied just because their parents, an authority figure, told them to. The findings validate some portions of his work but show that not all portions of it are applicable to the moral development of children. The findings also showed that children much younger than 10 can follow (and deviate) from Kohlberg's model of moral development.

== See also ==
- Lawrence Kohlberg's stages of moral development
- Piaget's theory of cognitive development
- Child development stages
- Ethics
- Hoax
- Social psychology
- Evolutionary psychology
- Developmental psychology
- Pathological lying
