= Sustainable cemetery =

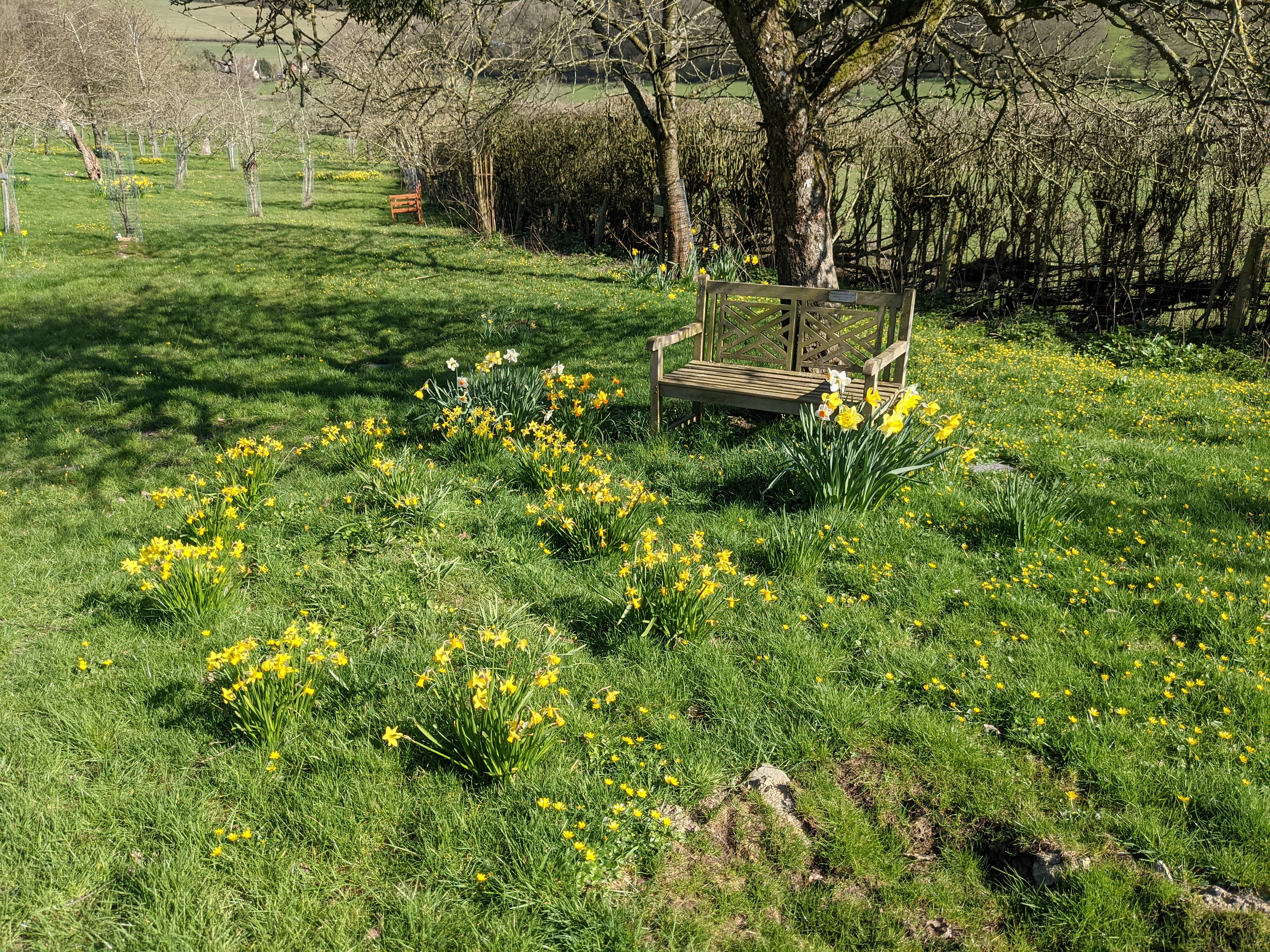
Example of a green burial ground in contrast to a typical traditional cemetery with maintained grounds and headstones.

A sustainable cemetery is a space that is designed to hold the remains of those who have died without causing unnecessary damage to the environment. Historically, most human burial methods do not cause negative effects to the planet, but embalming practices, cemetery maintenance, and the use of non-biodegradable materials popular today have proven to cause long lasting negative impacts to the environments and wildlife surrounding burial sites. Sustainable burial practices include eliminating the use of harmful chemicals and non-biodegradable materials, limiting over-consumption of natural materials, and promoting the natural decomposition of the body. Examples of sustainable burial methods can include green burials, alkaline hydrolysis, human composting, and sky burials.

== History of burial practices ==
Historically, burials have been a commonplace method for the disposal of bodies. Traditional burials did not include embalming chemicals, vaults, or coffins, and thus typically had better environmental impacts than many modern alternatives. Evidence has been found of Neanderthals burying their dead in modern day Israel, around 115,000 years ago, and this tradition would continue through modern human history.

In many civilizations, preservation of the human body has been considered vital preparation for the afterlife. The oldest example of this process dates back 7000 years to the Chinchorro culture found in modern day Chile. In order to preserve their dead, Ancient civilizations would utilize mummification processes such as embalming, wrapping the body, and sealing them in tombs. Mummification has been used across the globe, including in Egyptian, Incan, and Aztec civilizations, as well as in parts of Europe.

Exposure, or sky burials, of a body to the elements and animal consumption was a commonly used burial method in societies predating Christianity (found in places such as the Solomon Islands, Tibet, or Iran). However in other cultural contexts this method is only used to discard the bodies of criminals or prisoners.

Cremation was commonly used in Ancient Greece and Ancient Rome, but lost popularity during the 1st century due to the rise in Christianity. In 1888, Italy would become the first Christian country to legalize cremation, but burials would remain popular due to enduring attitudes which likened cremation to paganism or witchcraft and Christian beliefs regarding maintenance of the physical body for the afterlife.

Modern burial practices that utilized caskets and burial containers have been traced back to the 19th century in North America, where they were used to prevent body decay, body exposure, and soil sinkage. During the 1860s, embalming became a common practice during the American Civil War because it took a long time to transport soldiers' bodies home. The use of arsenic during this time has led to modern day elevated arsenic levels in groundwater near cemeteries that used these methods - one survey done near an Iowa City cemetery found water to be contaminated with arsenic at more than three times the federal limit.

== Environmental impacts of traditional cemeteries ==
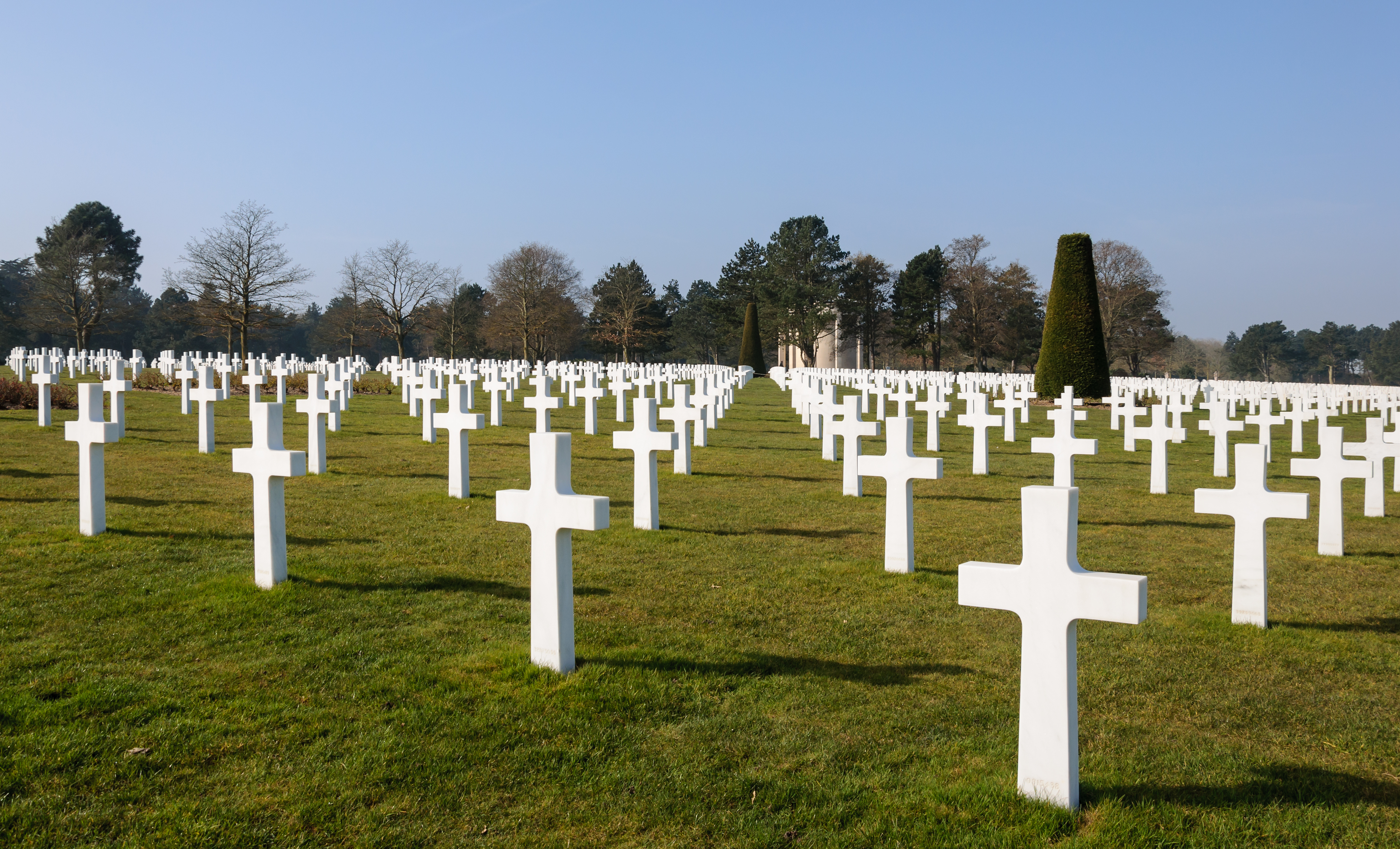
Example of a traditional cemetery in Normandy American Cemetery and Memorial in Colleville-sur-Mer, Calvados, Basse-Normandie, France.

Environmental impacts of regular cemetery practices include chemical leaching into the environment through embalming and preservation chemicals, cemetery maintenance practices, resource consumption, land use, and soil and water contamination.

Embalming: Embalming is done to preserve and slow down the body's natural decomposition process over time. However, embalming fluids contain a highly toxic carcinogen called formaldehyde which is also used in various products such as fertilizers and food preservatives. The environmental impacts of formaldehyde and other embalming chemicals are not heavily studied but their chemical stability and persistent nature creates a threat for bioaccumulation in the surrounding soils and water tables. Additionally, the U.S. buries more than 16.2 million liters of embalming fluid in the ground leading to increased percentages of arsenic and formaldehyde in the environment. Formaldehyde also poses a risk to handlers during the embalming process. Short term exposure includes eye, nose, or throat irritation, while medium exposure includes a cough, chest tightness, and heart issues, and long-term exposure can lead to fluid in the lungs, followed by death. Repeated exposure can lead to cancer.

- Cemetery maintenance: Cemetery maintenance plays a key role in the negative impacts towards the environment. Cemeteries typically utilize toxic chemicals in their day-to-day work including fertilizers, herbicides, and pesticides to keep the land maintained for visitor use and aesthetics. Human-made fertilizers have boosted the nutrients needed for plants to grow but overfertilization causes nitrogen runoff into soil and waterways, releasing nitrous oxide, a greenhouse gas that warms the planet 300 times more than carbon dioxide. Additionally, long-lasting organic pollutants are released during the breakdown of chlorinated materials like plastic indentures, body bags, coffins, and fuels such as wood containing chloride and have been found in the environment near cremation centers around the world.
- Resource consumption: Although the rise of cremation has reduced the number of materials consumed for burial, it is estimated that the U.S. alone uses 58,500 metric tons of steel, 1.5 million metric tons of concrete, 16.3 million liters of embalming fluid (3.1 million liters of formaldehyde), and hardwood equivalent to a board 73,000 km long. Additionally, a four-hectare portion of a cemetery typically contains enough wood to build 40 new homes, about 900 metric tons of steel, 18,000 metric tons of concrete, and enough embalming fluid to fill a medium-sized swimming pool.
- Land use: According to the United States Geological Survey, there are a total of 145,546 designated cemetery grounds in the U.S., but only 22,500 are considered "active." With that, cemeteries make up nearly 2 million acres of land in the U.S. The conversion of land and natural habitat suitable for existing wildlife to one meant for a single use imposes a loss of biodiversity and the degradation of ecosystems. As urban sprawl continues with a rising population, the size and function of burial grounds may disrupt the need for more land.
- Soil and water contamination: Components of cemetery waste include minerals, chemicals, and wood composites placed in the ground through coffins, vaults, and bodies. These components break down and leach into the soil and groundwater over time. Studies have found that cemeteries alter the surrounding microbiological components and increase the amount of heavy metal and toxic organic pollutants (TOCs) in the soil, water, and air. The most significant changes in soil composition occur from mineral and chemical contamination through increased concentrations of zinc, nickel, lead, and other potentially toxic metals that have been recorded near cemeteries. Additionally, modern-day caskets are made of arsenic-treated wood which contaminate the surrounding area over time, affecting wildlife and nearby water sources. Overall, traditional burial methods ignore the importance of soil biology and hydrology, potentially damaging ecosystems and polluting natural resources.

== Sustainable cemetery criteria ==
A sustainable cemetery, also known as a green cemetery or natural burial ground, is a burial site that prohibits non-organic materials common in conventional cemeteries. Non-organic burial materials include grave liners, caskets that are unable to break down, or body preservation chemicals such as formaldehyde.

The Green Burial Council was created in 2005 with a mission to teach people about sustainable death care, spreading word on the practice and offering certification programs to acquaint people with eco-burial methods. They produced certain criteria to explain what constitutes a green burial ground. Among the criteria is cutting down on the use of natural resources such as water and typical casket materials and generating minimal environmental degradation while putting the dead to rest. Other criteria include lessening the carbon output of cemeteries, the humane treatment of cemetery workers, and the protection of cemetery grounds from human activities and deterioration.

GBCs characteristics that make up sustainable cemeteries include:

- No toxic embalming
- No vaults
- Use of biodegradable containers, caskets, shrouds, and urns
- Discontinuation of herbicides, pesticides, and fertilizers
- Sustainable management practices
- Possible use of GPS units of non-native stone markers to mark grave sites
- Support of land conservation efforts

Overall, sustainable cemeteries provide many environmentally friendly alternatives compared to traditional cemeteries. The main focus of green burials is to "facilitate the natural decomposition of the body, thereby returning its nutrients to the earth." Sustainable cemeteries reduce carbon emissions by transitioning away from embalming fluids such as formaldehyde, a carcinogen that contaminates the soil and atmosphere, increasing pollution and carbon output beyond death. They use fewer natural resources, favoring biodegradable materials over traditional metal or wood caskets which demand a sizable amount of energy to produce and transport. Additionally, sustainable cemeteries often forego gravestones that are typically made of marble, limestone, or granite, and require fossil fuels to quarry and move. Instead, they use GPS marked graves so loved ones can find their buried individuals.

A large part of a sustainable cemetery's role is to conserve the natural habitat, welcoming native plants, protecting wildlife habitats, and nurturing biodiversity. A common practice is to dig shallow graves (approximately one meter deep) to increase oxygen and microbial activity, allowing the soil to break down the body faster, and giving nearby plants a nutrient fix. In the natural habitat, less upkeep is needed including mowing and watering, leading to more conservation of resources and an overall healthier ecosystem.

== Green burial methods ==
Green burials, also known as natural burials, are an eco-friendly alternative to traditional burials. The traditional burial involves embalming practices and use of caskets made with treated wood and metals, which can release harmful chemicals into the ground and prevent the natural decomposition process.

=== Green burial ===
The deceased's body is prepared without embalming fluids and covered with clothes or a shroud made from all natural fibers that are biodegradable. The body is placed in a casket made from mycelium, cardboard, woven fibers, untreated wood, unfired clay, or other "plant-derived, recycled plant-derived, natural, animal, or unfired earthen materials." The grave is dug to be shallower, around a meter deep. This promotes better decomposition, as there is more oxygen and a more active microbial ecosystem. As the body decomposes, it returns nutrients back to the soil. This method of burial can be combined with planting native plants or trees to contribute to ecosystem conservation.

=== Alkaline hydrolysis ===
Alkaline hydrolysis, also known as water cremation and "aquamation," is an eco-friendly alternative to traditional cremation. This process uses water, alkaline chemicals, heat, and sometimes pressure to speed up a body's natural decomposition after death.

The deceased is placed in a stainless-steel chamber and unlike traditional cremation (depending on local law), implants that cannot be exposed to heat do not need to be removed. The steel chamber is filled with a solution of 95% water and 5% alkali. The contents of the chamber are subjected to heat ranging from 199 °F-302 °F. Depending on the equipment, pressure and agitation are also applied. Depending on body mass and differing equipment used, this process can take anywhere from 3–16 hours. The tissues and fats are broken down to their basic chemical compounds, including salts and amino acids, dissolved into the water. This solution of water will be disposed of and treated by local wastewater treatment centers according to their laws and regulations. The solid remains are bone fragments. These fragments will be processed into a fine powder and returned to the family in an urn. The effluent is considered environmentally friendly, and useful as fertilizer. More information here.

=== Human composting ===
Human composting is a method of body preparation and disposal that utilizes microbes and oftentimes heat to facilitate the breakdown of the body into nutrient-rich, microorganism-abundant compost. There are many ways to successfully carry out this funeral practice, but one company based in Seattle, Recompose, uses their own method. They lay a received body into a vessel, surrounded by straw, alfalfa, and wood chips. This vessel is closed for around 1–2 months while the body is being decomposed. However, this method of composting poses a problem with bones and teeth. Bones and teeth cannot be composted in the same way and need special equipment to break them down. Similar to the modern cremation process, artificial body parts, pacemakers, fillings, and prosthetics must be removed beforehand.

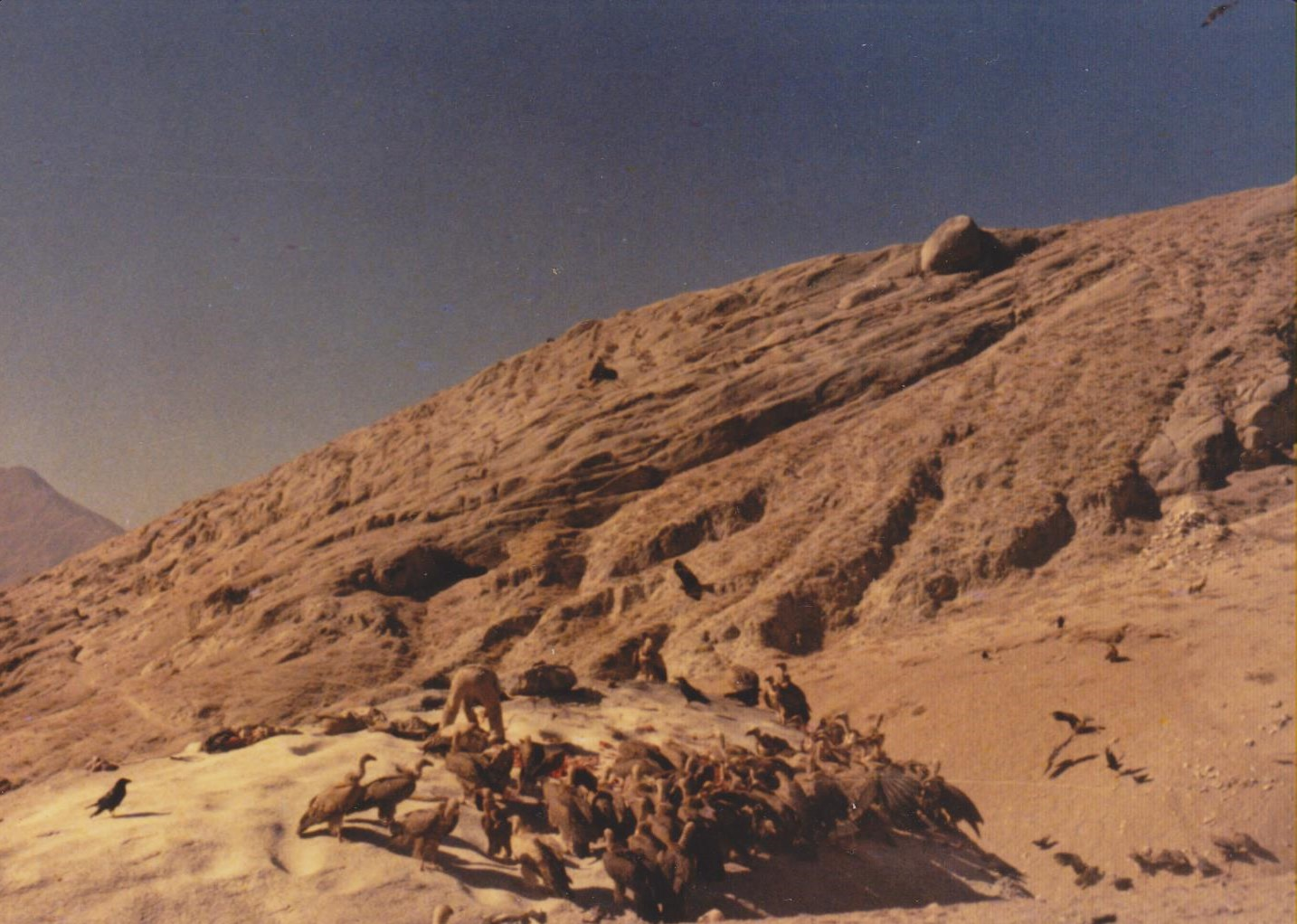
Vultures feeding on the rock used to expose bodies at a sky burial outside Lhasa, Tibet, during the first lunar month, March 1985. Photographs of the sky burial taken with permission of the participants, on condition that no photographs were taken before the vultures were called to eat the bodies of the three deceased persons. Photo scanned from a print.

=== Sky burials ===
Sky burials, or body decomposition through exposure, is a practice that has been used for years in both ethnic and religious cultures. There are variations between cultures and preference, but largely, families and/or religious officials will take the deceased's body and place it upon a hill or mountaintop. This location must be accessible to scavengers, such as vultures, carrions, eagles, bears, and foxes. These bodies will decompose faster due to exposure to the elements, as well as becoming a source of food for scavenging fauna. This burial option may be the most eco-friendly, as it does not require any equipment, chemicals, or cause pollution.

This burial practice is still widely found in South and East Asia in Tibet, Mongolia, Nepal, Bhutan, and India. Many Tibetans are adherents of Vajrayana Buddhism, in which sky burials are a tradition.
