= Knowing Neurons =

Neuroscience education website

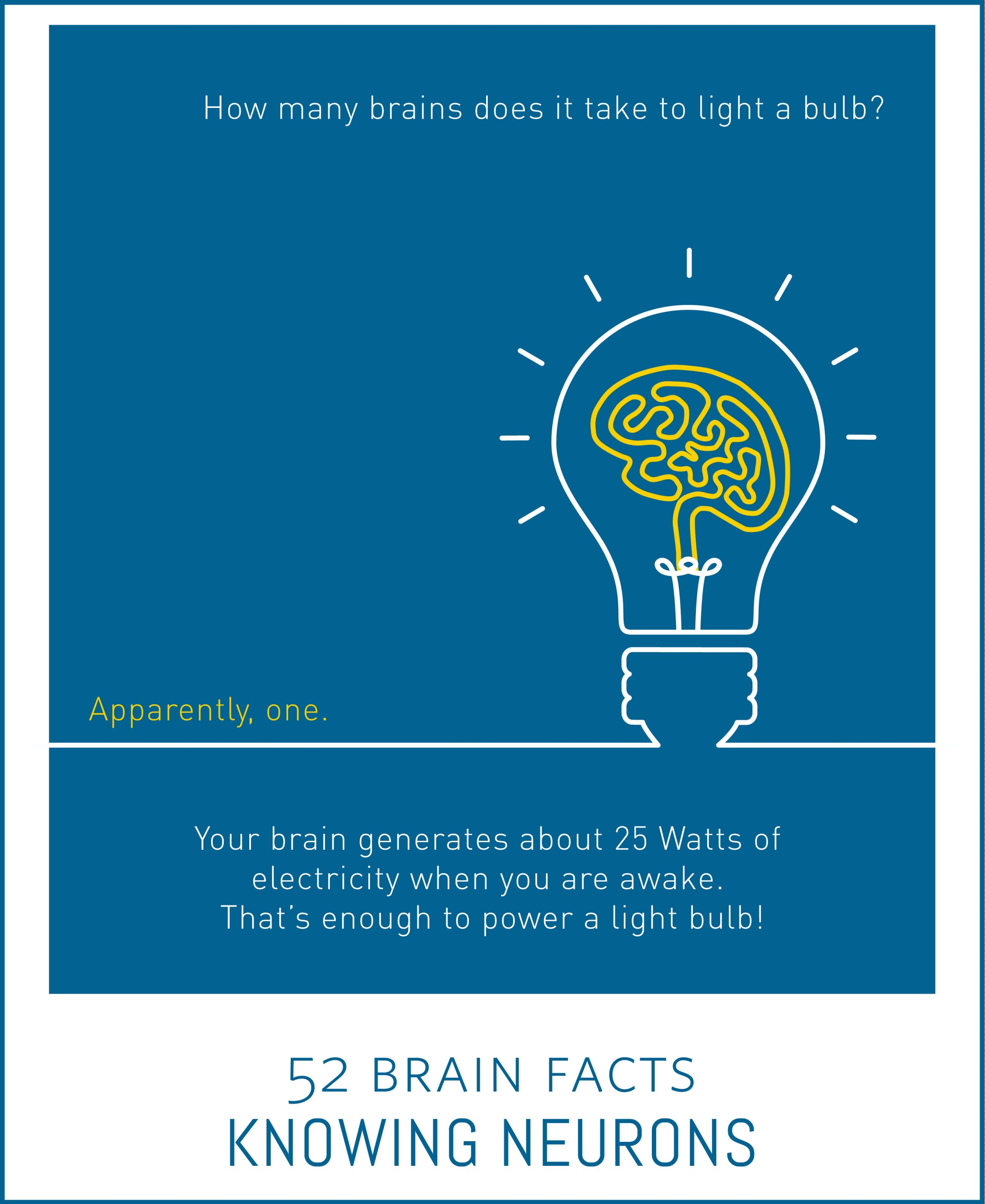
Infographic from the 52 Brain Facts series by Knowing Neurons

Knowing Neurons is a neuroscience education website created in 2012 by PhD graduate students at the University of Southern California (USC) and the University of California, Los Angeles (UCLA). The website features regular content focused on elucidating fundamental neuroscience concepts, new research, and current hypotheses. Special series featured on Knowing Neurons include the weekly 52 Brain Facts infographics than ran from 2015 to 2016 and the series Weird Animal Brains on comparative neurobiology that debuted in 2016. Most content on Knowing Neurons is in the form of articles, infographics, book reviews, and interviews with prominent neuroscientists. Knowing Neurons has also produced several YouTube videos, including interviews with people with synesthesia and an animated video This Is Your Brain on Music narrated by actor Bob Turton.

In 2016, several Knowing Neurons team members were recognized for their contributions to science education through the website with the Society for Neuroscience Next Generation Award. "Knowing Neurons" is listed as an educator resource by Brainfacts.org, a neuroscience website maintained by the Kavli Foundation, the Gatsby Charitable Foundation, and the Society for Neuroscience. Knowing Neurons is also an official partner of Aeon Magazine.

== Team ==
Knowing Neurons was founded by former editor-in-chief Dr. Kate Fehlhaber while she was a neuroscience PhD student at UCLA researching visual processing in the retina using electrophysiology. She has been featured in relation to her Knowing Neurons work on Forbes.com Women at Forbes series. Dr. Joel Frohlich, currently a postdoc at UCLA and blogger for Psychology Today, took over as editor-in-chief of Knowing Neurons in 2017, followed by Alexa Erdogan in 2019. Dr. Joo Yeun Lee, a neuroscientist who received her doctorate from USC, served as senior graphic designer until 2017 and has designed many of Knowing Neurons' infographics. Visual designer Dr. Kayleen Schreiber has shaped the website's artistic direction since 2016 and makes regular contributions with her Weird Animal Brains series of infographics.

Knowing Neurons frequently features content by guest contributors, many of whom are neuroscience PhD students or postdoctoral researchers.

== Infographics ==
Knowing Neurons is perhaps best known for their infographics created by Joo Yeun Lee and Kayleen Schreiber. These infographics have focused on a wide variety of topics in neuroscience, such as CRISPR and scientific peer review. Special series of infographics produced by Knowing Neurons include 52 Brain Facts and Weird Animal Brains. 52 Brain Facts presented a new fact about the brain each week for 52 weeks from September 2015 to September 2016. Facts are presented on the website in a 'myth or fact?' format, such as "Myth or Fact? One region of the brain sets us humans apart from other species." The proceeding infographic then serves to either debunk the myth or confirm the fact.

== Awards ==
In 2016, Knowing Neurons team members Kate Fehlhaber, Joel Frohlich, and Joo Yeun Lee received the Society for Neuroscience Next Generation Award for their contributions to public neuroscience communication, outreach, and education through Knowing Neurons.

In 2022, the Knowing Neurons team under the leadership of Arielle Hogan and Alba Peris-Yagüe received a second Society for Neuroscience Science Education and Outreach: Next Generation Award for their work on translating the site into Spanish

== Partnership with Aeon ==
Knowing Neurons has been partnered with digital magazine Aeon since 2016. Aeon features selected articles written by Knowing Neurons writers on Aeon.
