= Cognitive and Behavioral Neurology =

- Discipline: Cognitive neurology
- Language: English
- Edited by: Barry Gordon

Publication details
- Former name(s): Neuropsychiatry, Neuropsychology and Behavioral Neurology
- History: 1988–present
- Publisher: Lippincott Williams & Wilkins
- Frequency: Quarterly
- Open access: Hybrid
- Impact factor: 1.4 (2022)

Standard abbreviations
- ISO 4: Cogn. Behav. Neurol.

Indexing
- ISSN: 1543-3633 (print); 1543-3641 (web)
- LCCN: 2003212065
- OCLC no.: 1071076038
- Neuropsychiatry, Neuropsychology and Behavioral Neurology
- ISSN: 0894-878X

Links
- Journal homepage; Online access; Online archive

Cognitive and Behavioral Neurology is a quarterly peer-reviewed medical journal covering cognitive neurology. It was established in 1988 as Neuropsychiatry, Neuropsychology & Behavioral Neurology, obtaining its current title in 2003. The journal is published by Lippincott Williams & Wilkins and the editor-in-chief is Barry Gordon (Johns Hopkins Medical Institutions). It is an official journal of the Society for Behavioral and Cognitive Neurology.

== Abstracting and indexing ==
The journal is abstracted and indexed in:

- Current Contents/Clinical Medicine
- Embase
- Index Medicus/MEDLINE/PubMed
- PsycINFO
- Science Citation Index Expanded
- Scopus

According to the Journal Citation Reports, the journal has a 2021 impact factor of 1.590.
