= Vardanidzor =

Vardanidzor Վարդանիձոր
- Location within Armenia Location within Syunik Province
- Coordinates: 38°58′10″N 46°12′51″E
- Country: Armenia
- Province: Syunik
- Municipality: Meghri

Area
  - Total: 23.02 km^{2} (8.89 sq mi)

Population (2011)
  - Total: 228
  - Density: 9.90/km^{2} (25.7/sq mi)
- Time zone: UTC+4 (AMT)

Vardanidzor (Armenian: Վարդանիձոր) is a village in the Meghri Municipality of the Syunik Province in Armenia.

== Demographics ==
The village had a population of 197 in 2001, and 228 in 2011.

== Municipal administration ==
The village was the center of the Vardanidzor community, which contained the villages of Vardanidzor, Aygedzor and Tkhkut until the June 2017 administrative and territorial reforms, when the village became a part of the Meghri Municipality. The community of Vardanidzor had a population of 263 in 2001, 280 in 2009, 292 in 2010, and 306 in 2011.
