= Kakavaberd dialect =

Dialect of Armenian

Kakavaberd
- Կաքավաբերդի բարբառ
- Native to: Armenia
- Region: Vahravar, Gudemnis, Kuris, Agarak, Meghri
- Ethnicity: Armenians
- Native speakers: (few)
- Language family: Indo-European: Armenian; Eastern; Kakavaberd
- Writing system: Armenian

Language codes
- ISO 639-3: –
- Glottolog: None

The Kakavaberd dialect (Armenian: Կաքավաբերդի բարբառ) is an Armenian dialect spoken in the villages Vahravar, Gudemnis, Kuris and Agarak in Armenia. The inhabitants of the latter village now live in Meghri and it should not be confused with town Agarak.
