= Tashtun =

Tashtun Տաշտուն
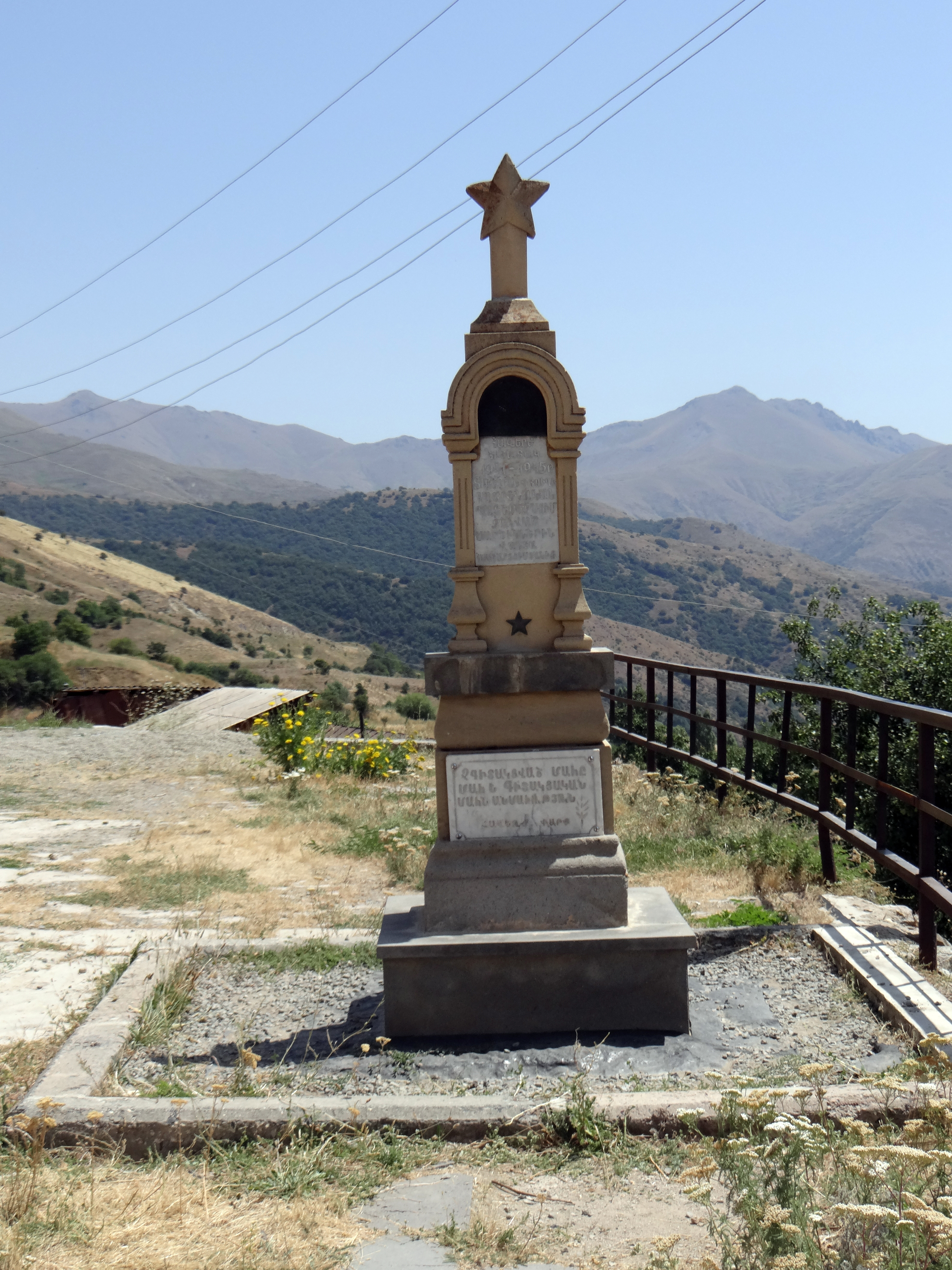
- WWII monument in Tashtun

- Location within Armenia Location within Syunik Province
- Coordinates: 39°03′53″N 46°10′19″E
- Country: Armenia
- Province: Syunik
- Municipality: Meghri

Area
  - Total: 21.60 km^{2} (8.34 sq mi)

Population (2011)
  - Total: 104
  - Density: 4.81/km^{2} (12.5/sq mi)
- Time zone: UTC+4 (AMT)

Tashtun (Armenian: Տաշտուն) is a village in the Meghri Municipality of the Syunik Province in Armenia.

== Demographics ==
The Statistical Committee of Armenia reported its population was 134 in 2010, down from 170 at the 2001 census.

== Gallery ==
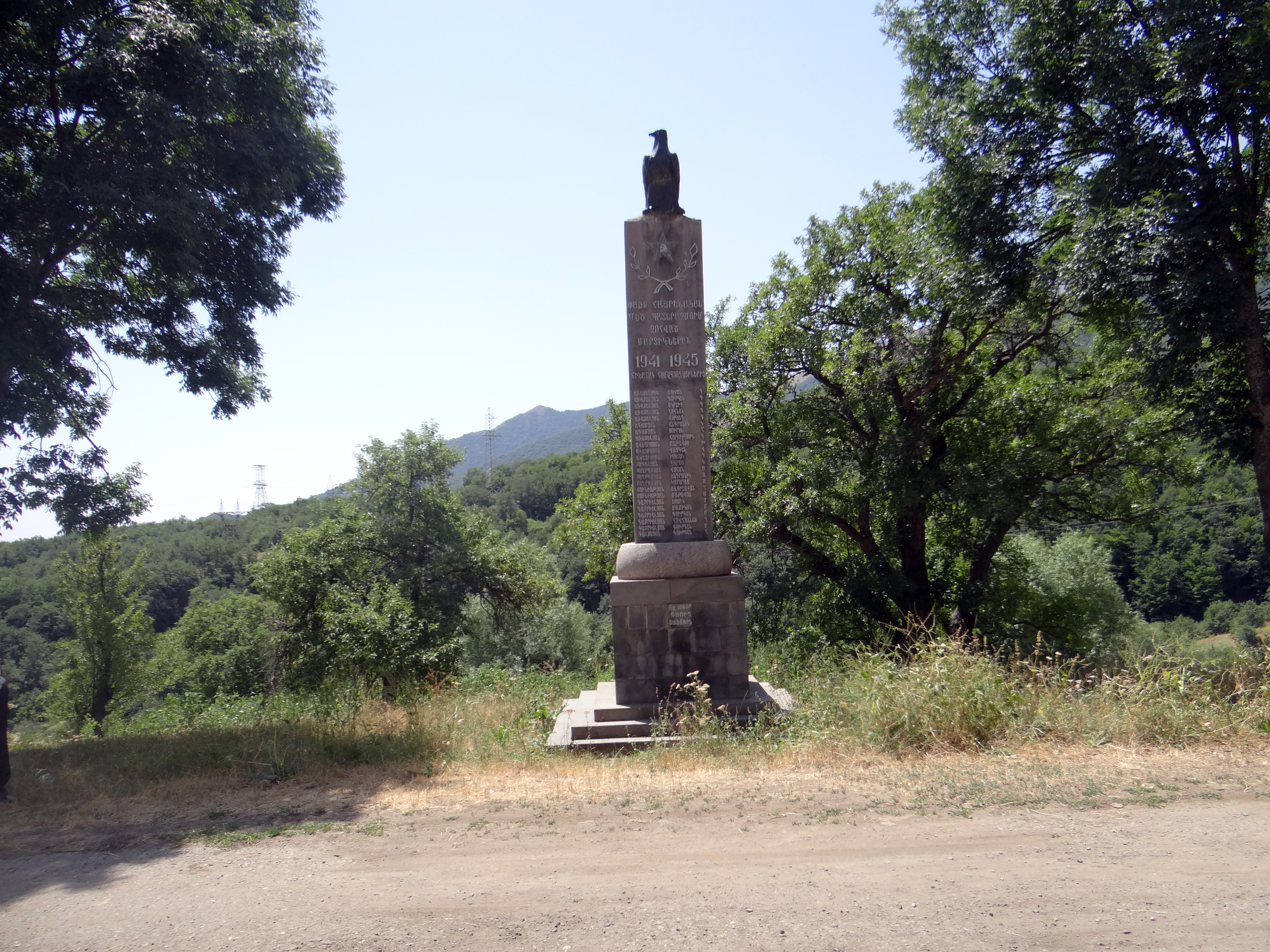
WWII monument in Tashtun

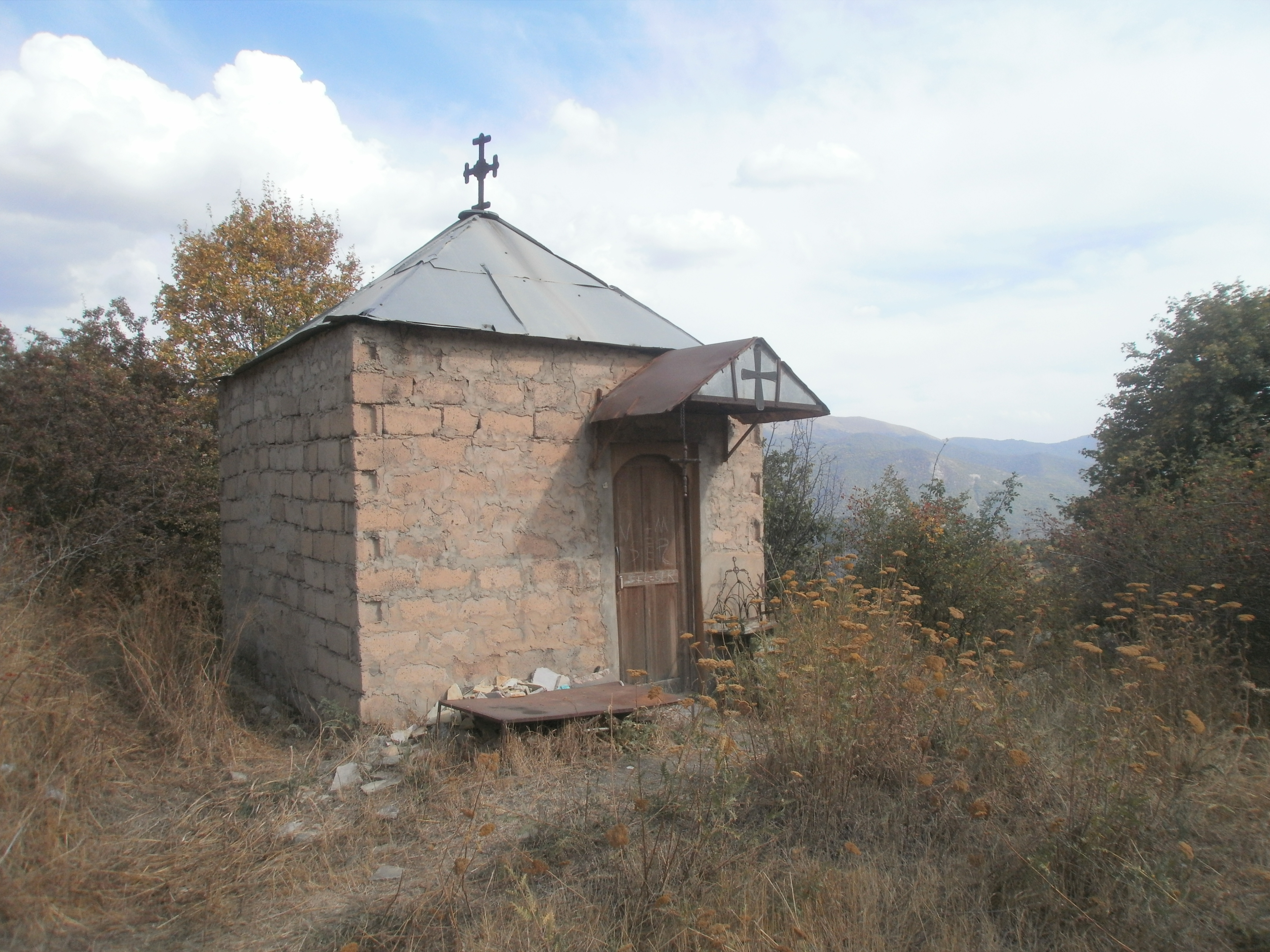
Chapel in Tashtun

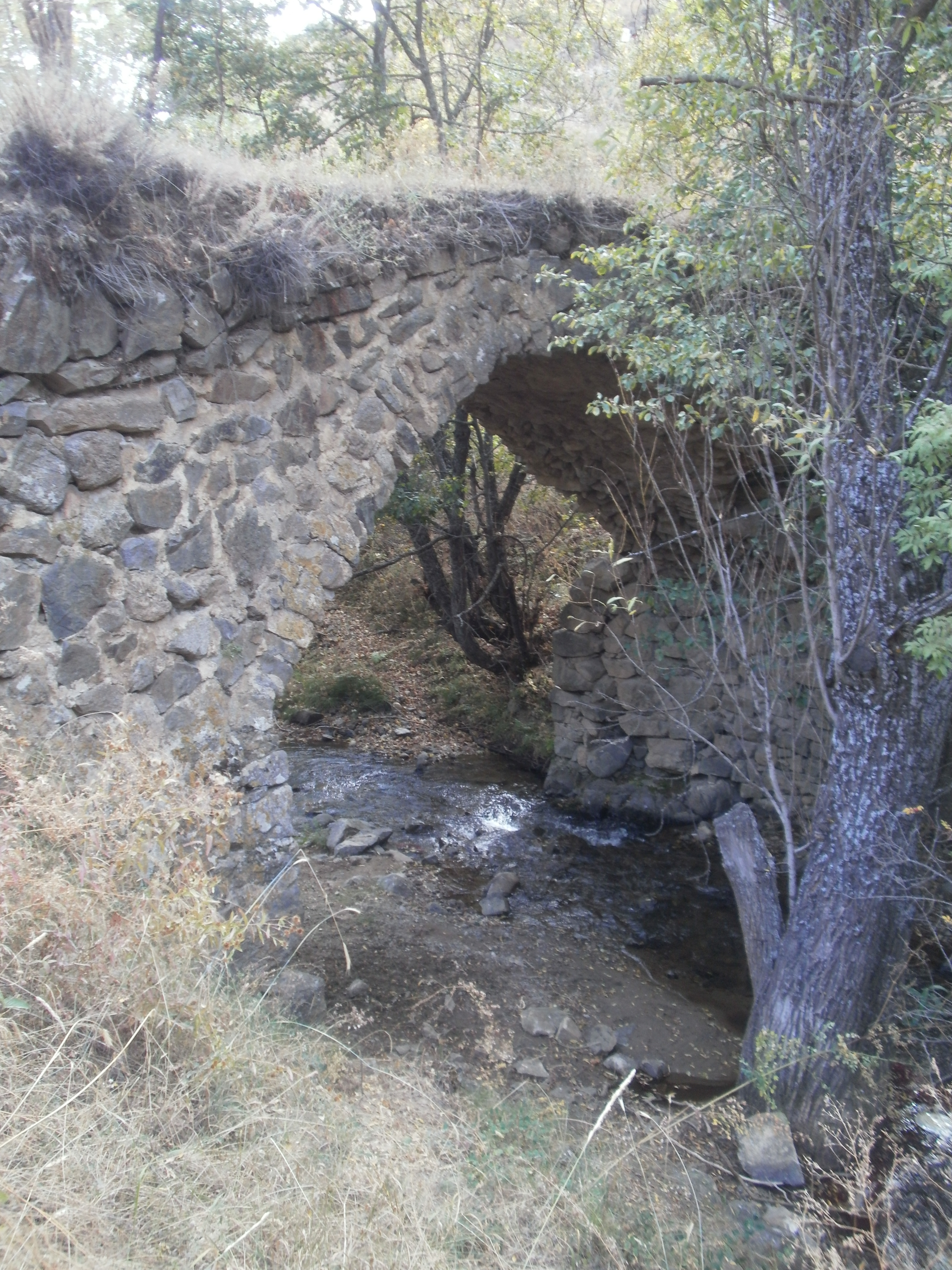
Bridge in Tashtun

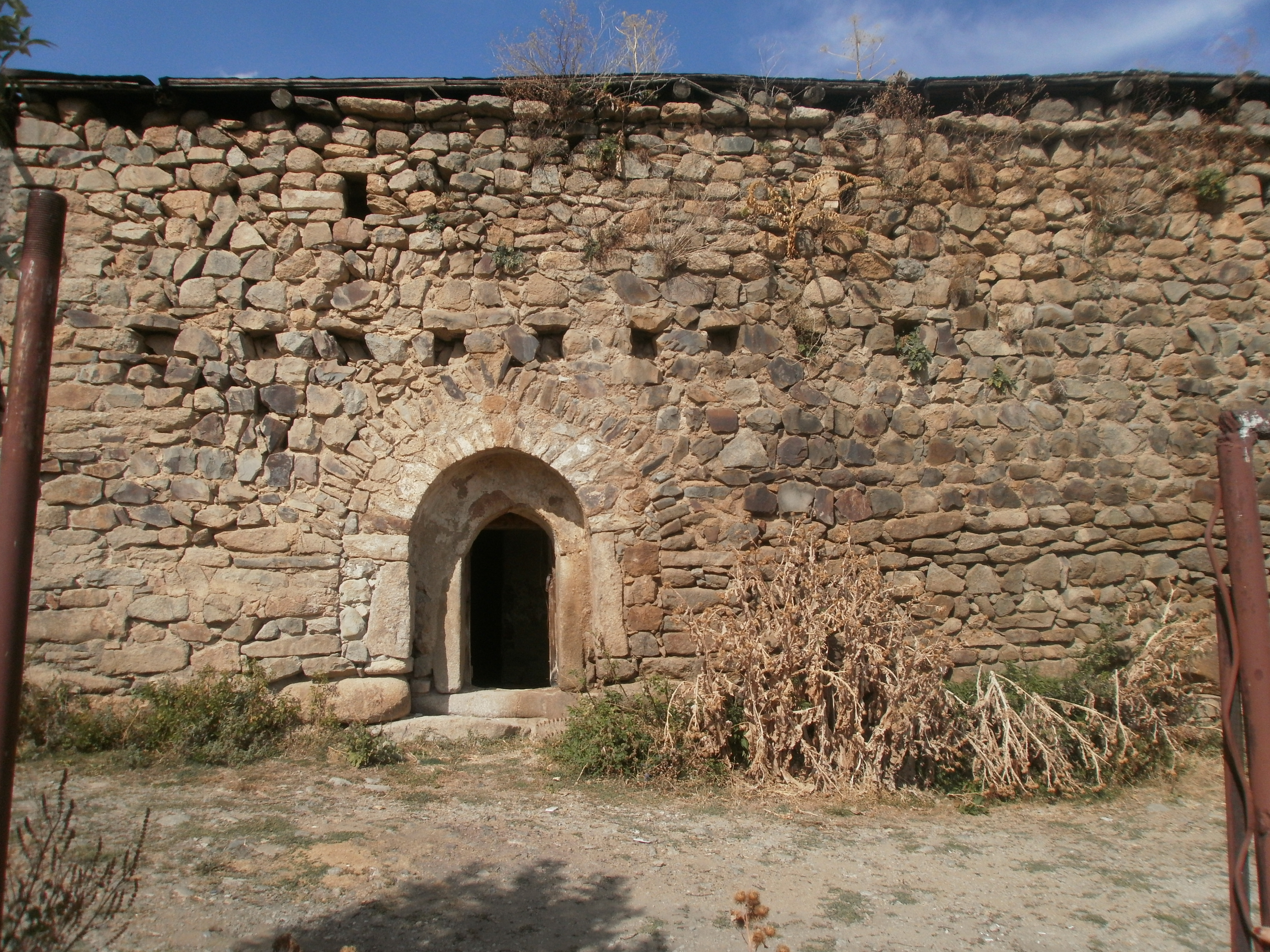
Church in Tashtun
