= Meghri Municipality =

Meghri Մեղրի
- Urban Community
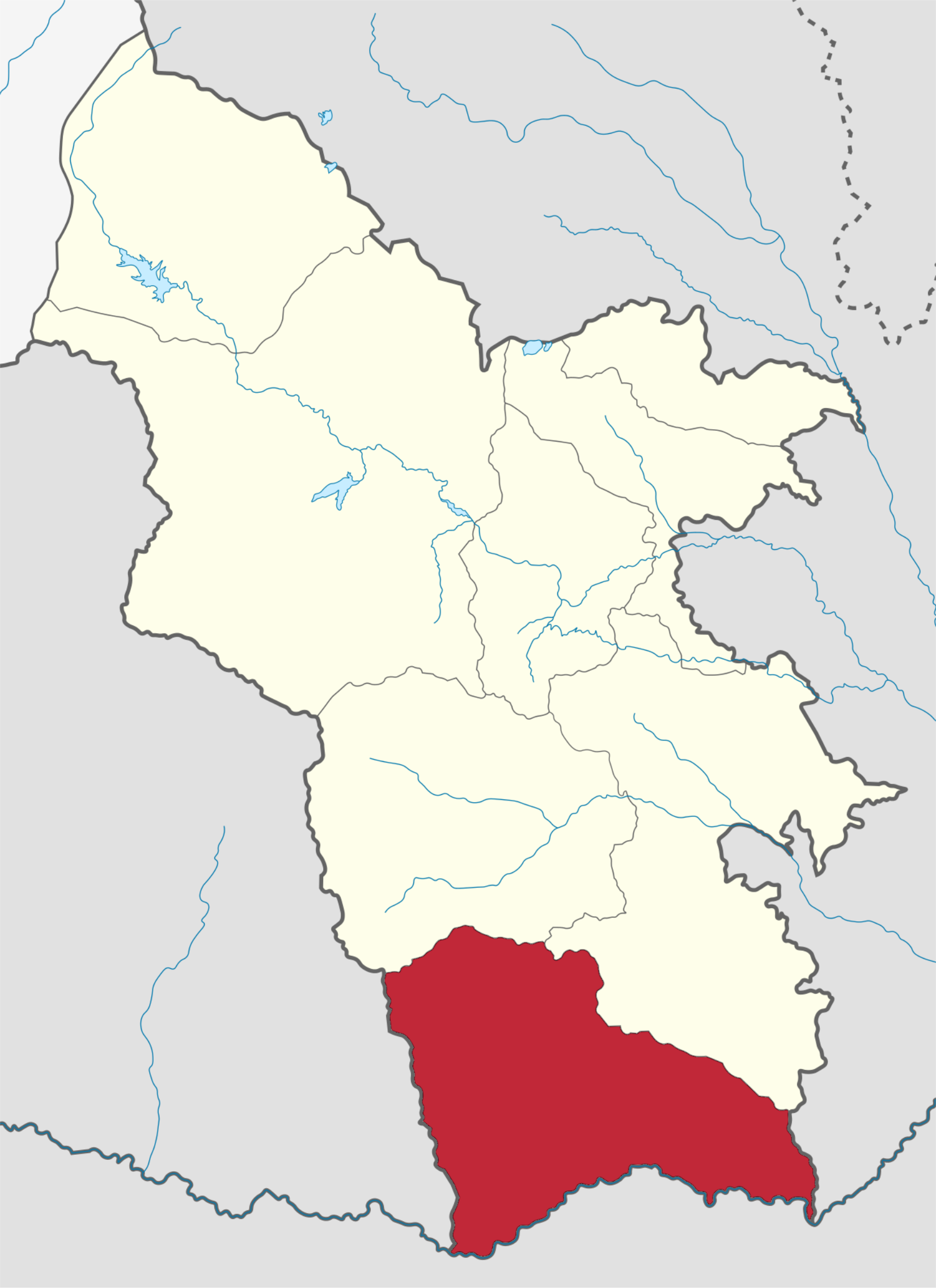
- Coordinates: 38°54′N 46°12′E
- Country: Armenia
- Province: Syunik
- Formed: 17 June 2016
- Administrative centre: Meghri

Government
  - Mayor: Khachatur Andreasyan

Population (2011 census)
  - Total: 11,377
- Time zone: AMT (UTC+04)
- Postal code: 3201–3519
- ISO 3166 code: AM-SU
- FIPS 10-4: AM08

Meghri Municipality, referred to as Meghri Community (Armenian: Մեղրի Համայնք Meghri Hamaynk), is an urban community and administrative subdivision of Syunik Province of Armenia, at the south of the country bordering Iran. Consisted of a group of settlements, its administrative centre is the town of Meghri.

== Included settlements ==
Settlement	Type	Population (2011 census)
Meghri	Town, administrative centre	4,580
Agarak	Town	4,429
Alvank	Village	352
Araksashen	Village	Unknown
Aygedzor	Village	9
Gudemnis	Village	21
Karchevan	Village	301
Kuris	Village	44
Lehvaz	Village	571
Lichk	Village	161
Nrnadzor	Village	148
Shvanidzor	Village	312
Tashtun	Village	104
Tkhkut	Village	69
Vahravar	Village	48
Vardanidzor	Village	228

== Politics ==
Meghri Municipal Assembly (Armenian: Մեղրիի համայնքապետարան, Meghri hamaynqapetaran) is the representative body in Meghri Municipality, consisting of 15 members which are elected every five years. The last election was held in October 2021. Bagrat Zakaryan of Hanrapetutyun Party was elected mayor until May 2024 followed by Khachatur Andreasyan of Liberal Party.

Party	2021	Current Municipal Assembly
**Hanrapetutyun Party**	**6**	
Civil Contract	**5**	
**Liberal Party**	**2**	
Country of Living	**2**	
Total	15	

Ruling coalition or party marked in bold.

== See also ==
- Syunik Province
