= Kuris, Armenia =

Kuris Կուրիս
- Location within Armenia Location within Syunik Province
- Coordinates: 38°55′27″N 46°10′48″E
- Country: Armenia
- Province: Syunik
- Municipality: Meghri

Area
  - Total: 14.31 km^{2} (5.53 sq mi)

Population (2011)
  - Total: 44
  - Density: 3.1/km^{2} (8.0/sq mi)
- Time zone: UTC+4 (AMT)

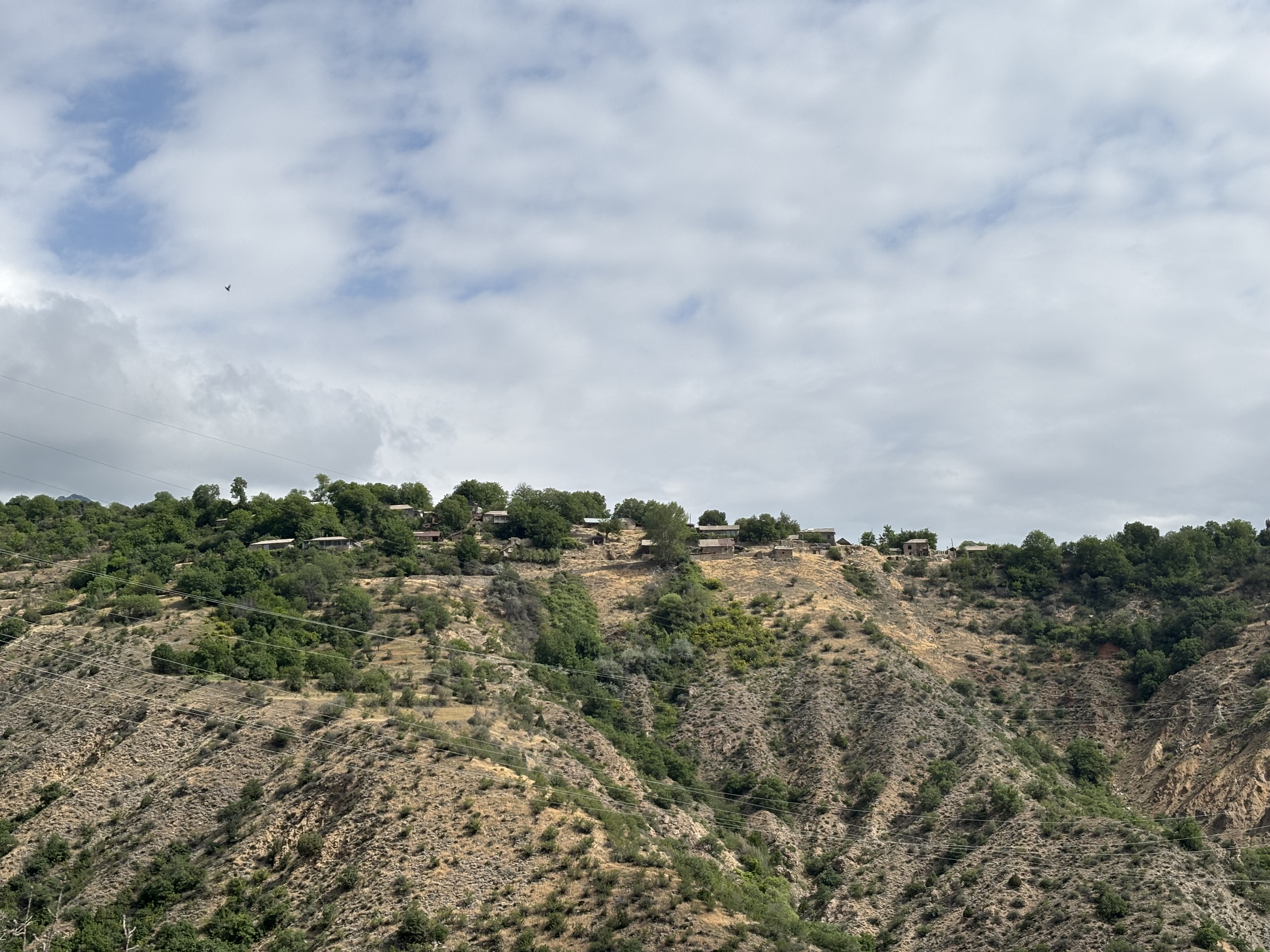
Village viewed from a neighbouring hill

Kuris (Armenian: Կուրիս) is a village in the Meghri Municipality of the Syunik Province in Armenia.

== Demographics ==
The Statistical Committee of Armenia reported its population was 61 in 2010, down from 112 at the 2001 census. The inhabitants speak the Kakavaberd dialect of Armenian.
