= Alvank =

Alvank Ալվանք
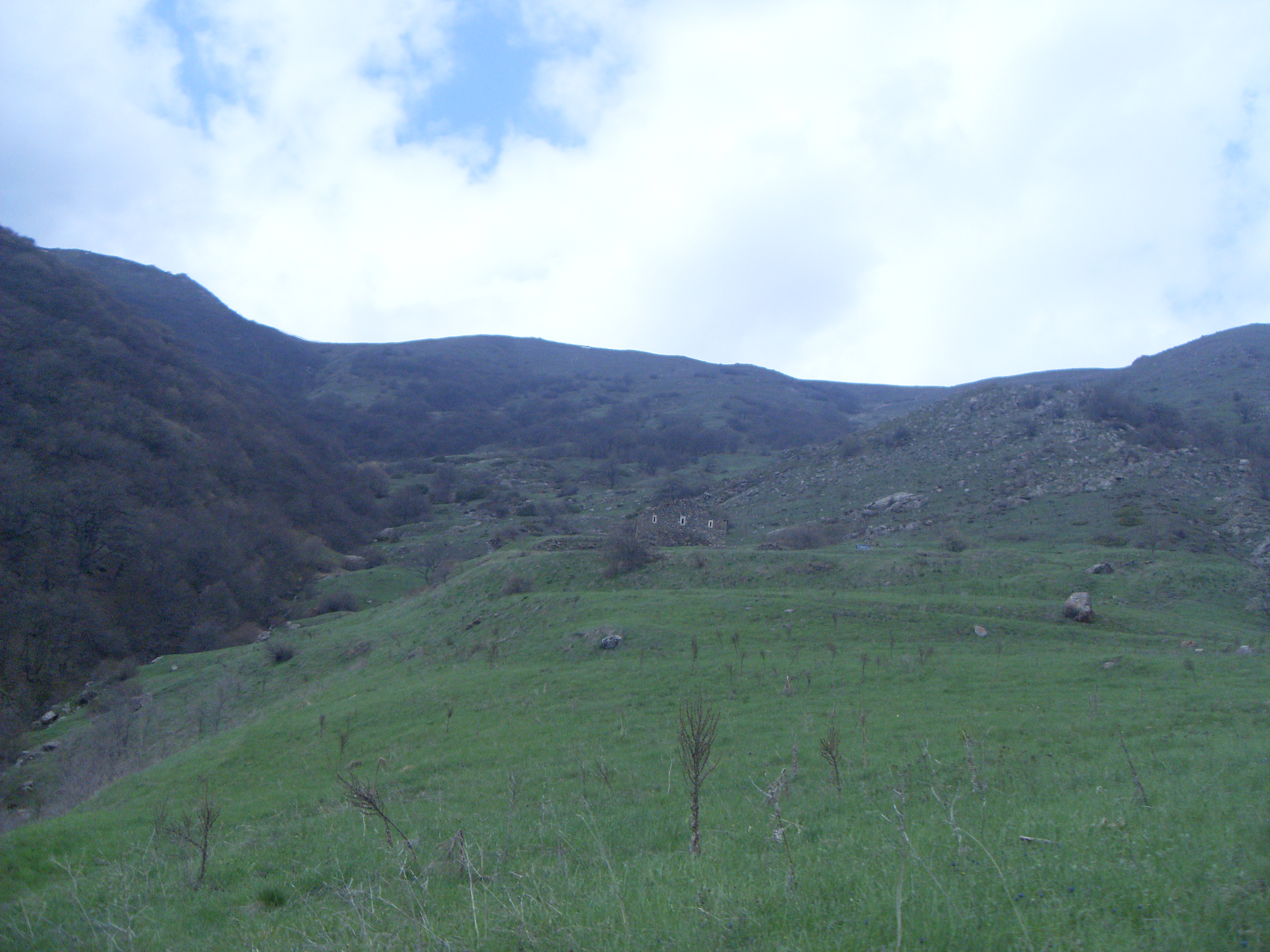

- Location within Armenia Location within Syunik Province
- Coordinates: 38°56′18″N 46°20′42″E
- Country: Armenia
- Province: Syunik
- Municipality: Meghri

Area
  - Total: 62.90 km^{2} (24.29 sq mi)

Population (2011)
  - Total: 352
  - Density: 5.60/km^{2} (14.5/sq mi)
- Time zone: UTC+4 (AMT)

Alvank (Armenian: Ալվանք); is a village in the Meghri Municipality of the Syunik Province in Armenia.

== History ==
There is a 17th/18th-century Armenian monastery in the village.

== Demographics ==
The National Statistical Service of the Republic of Armenia (ARMSTAT) reported its population as 343 in 2010, down from 382 at the 2001 census.

== Gallery ==
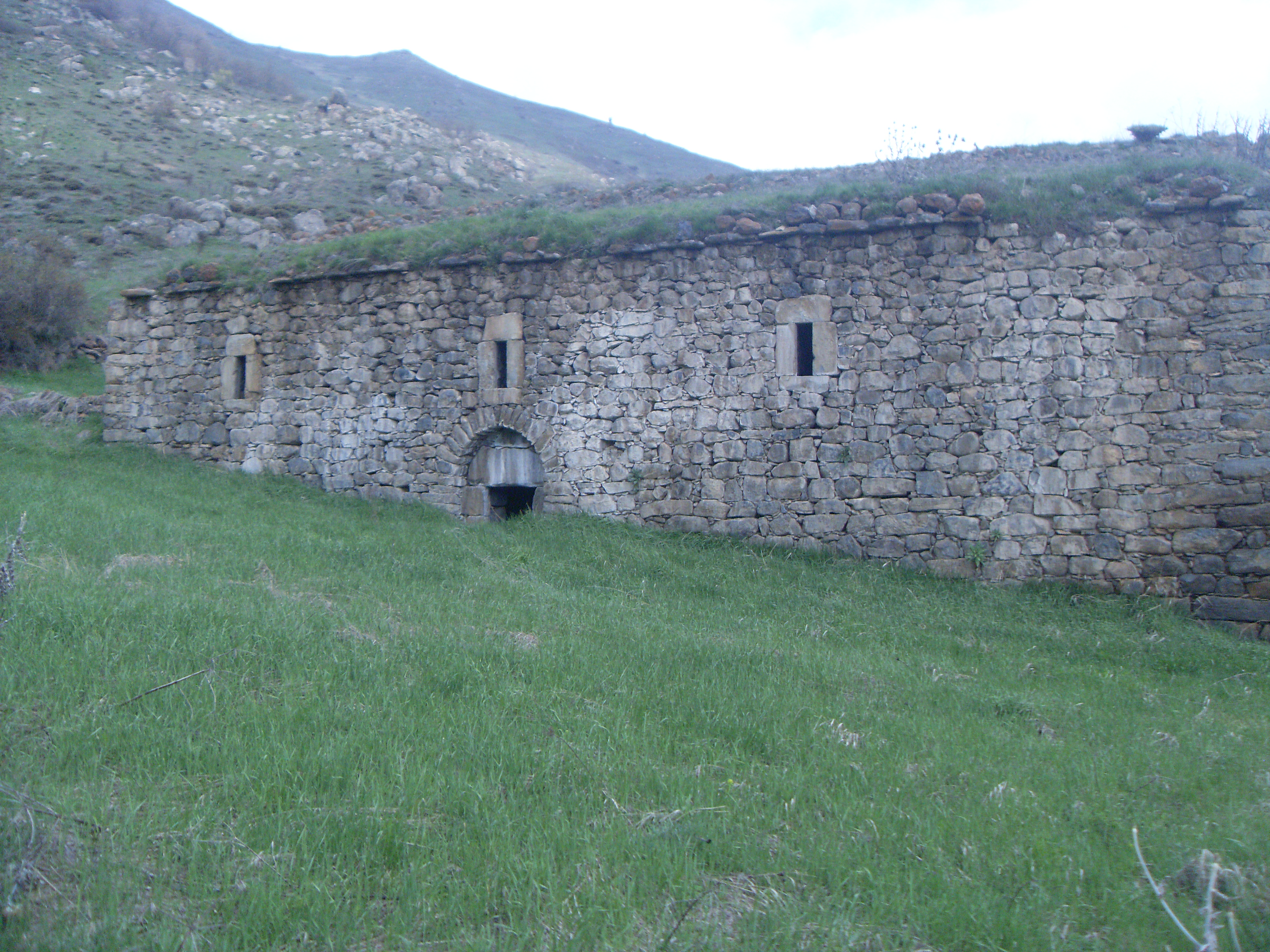
Kusanats Anapat church

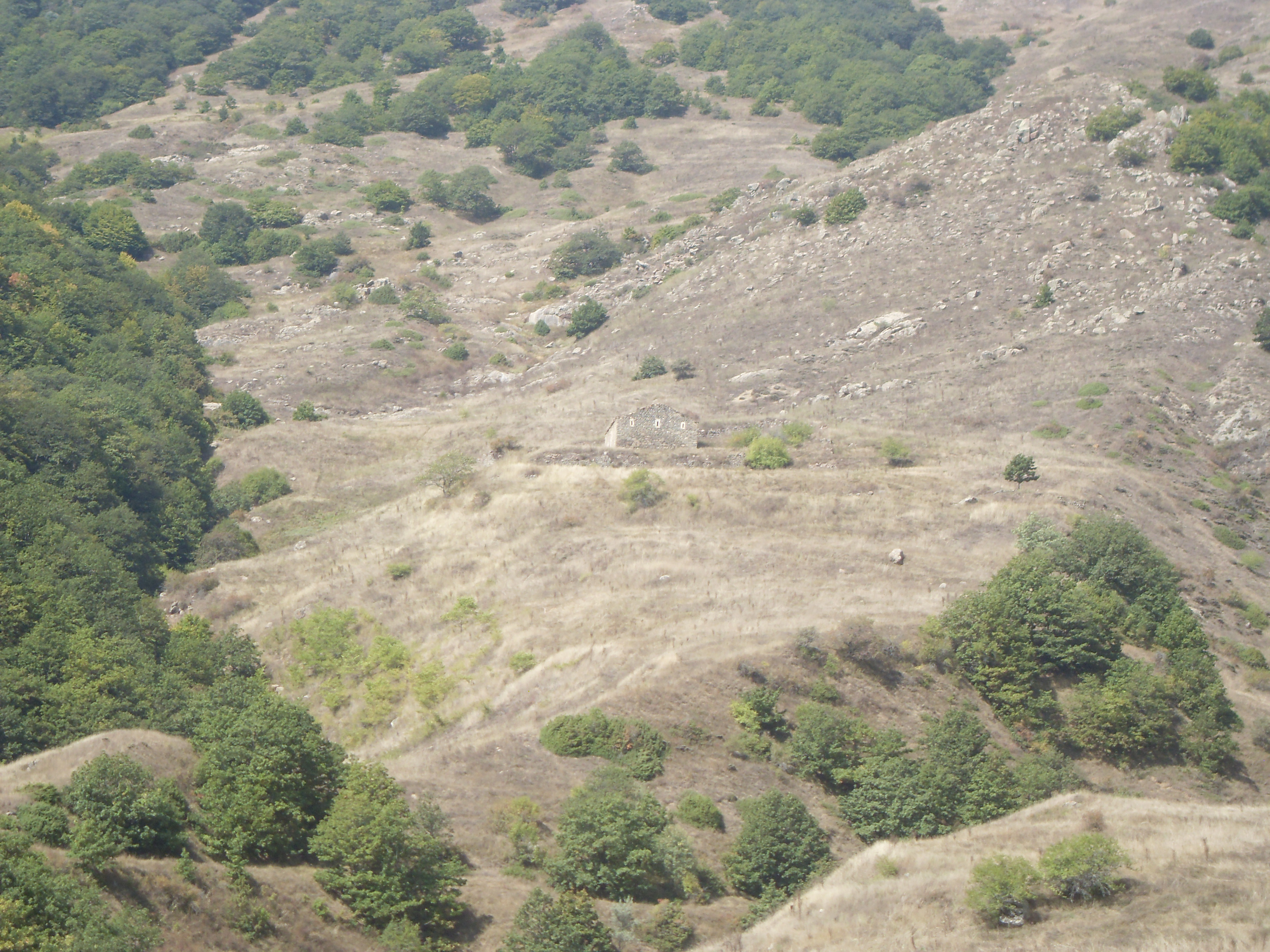
Scenery

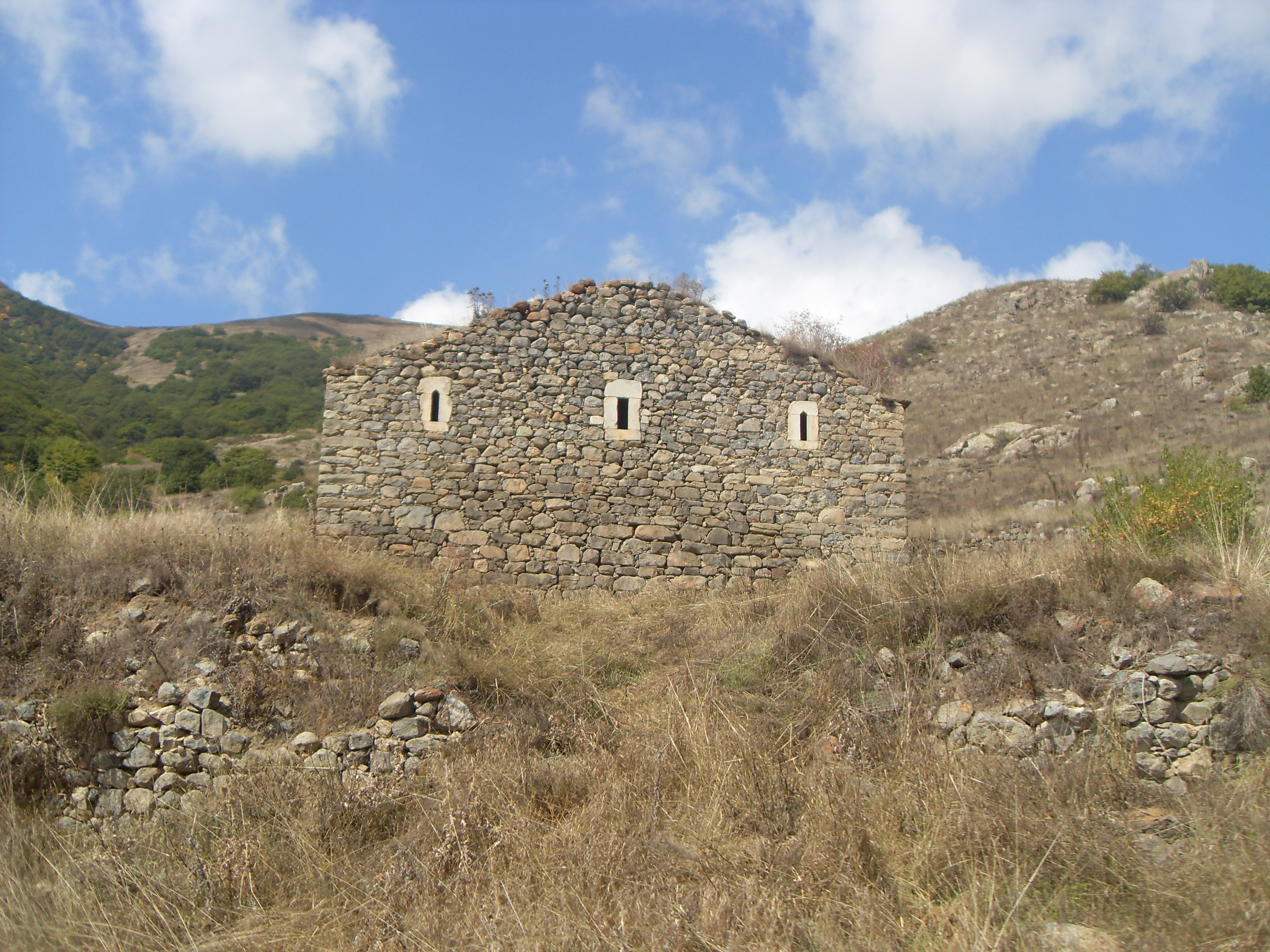
Kusanats Anapat church

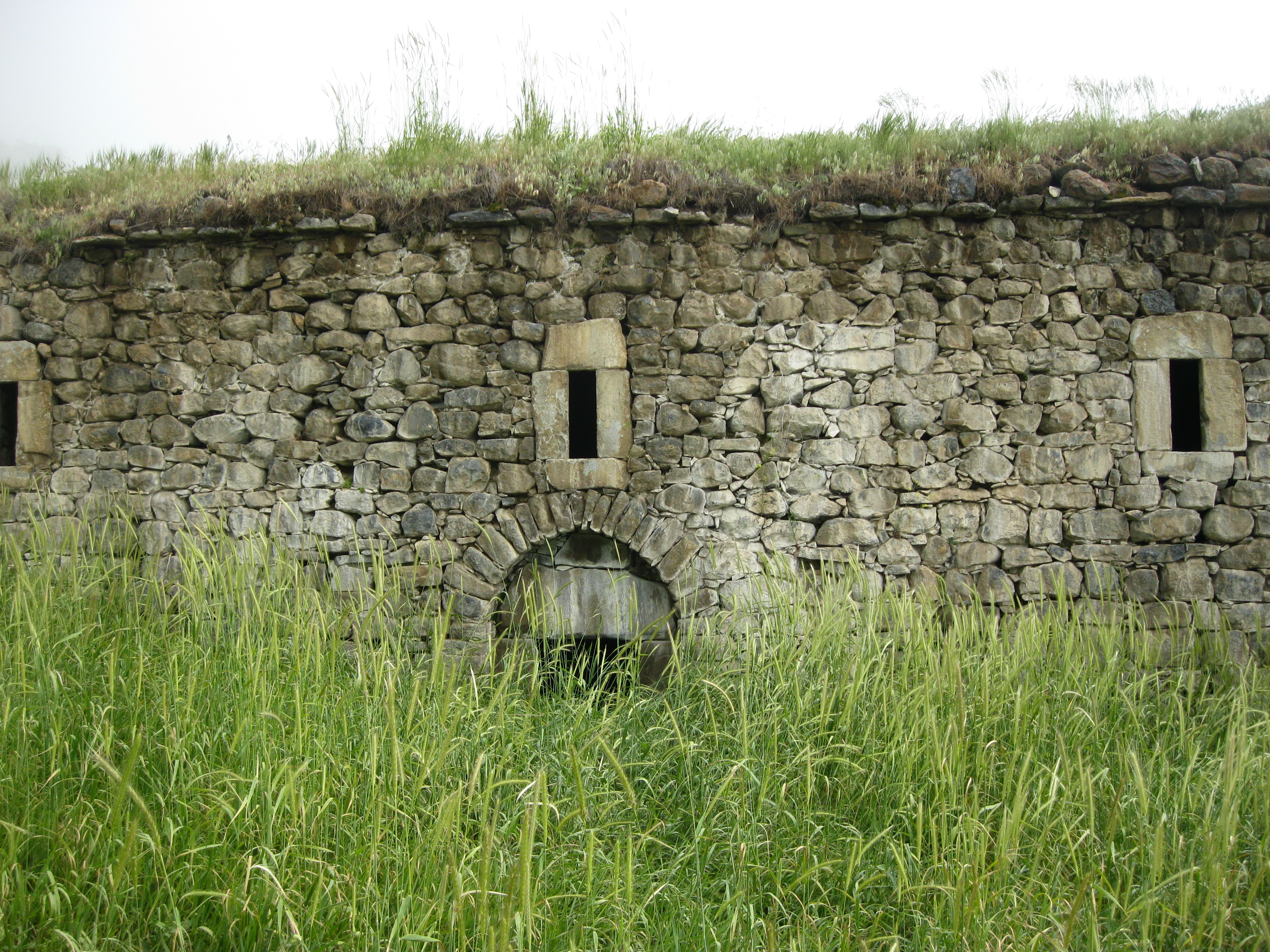
Kusanats Anapat church

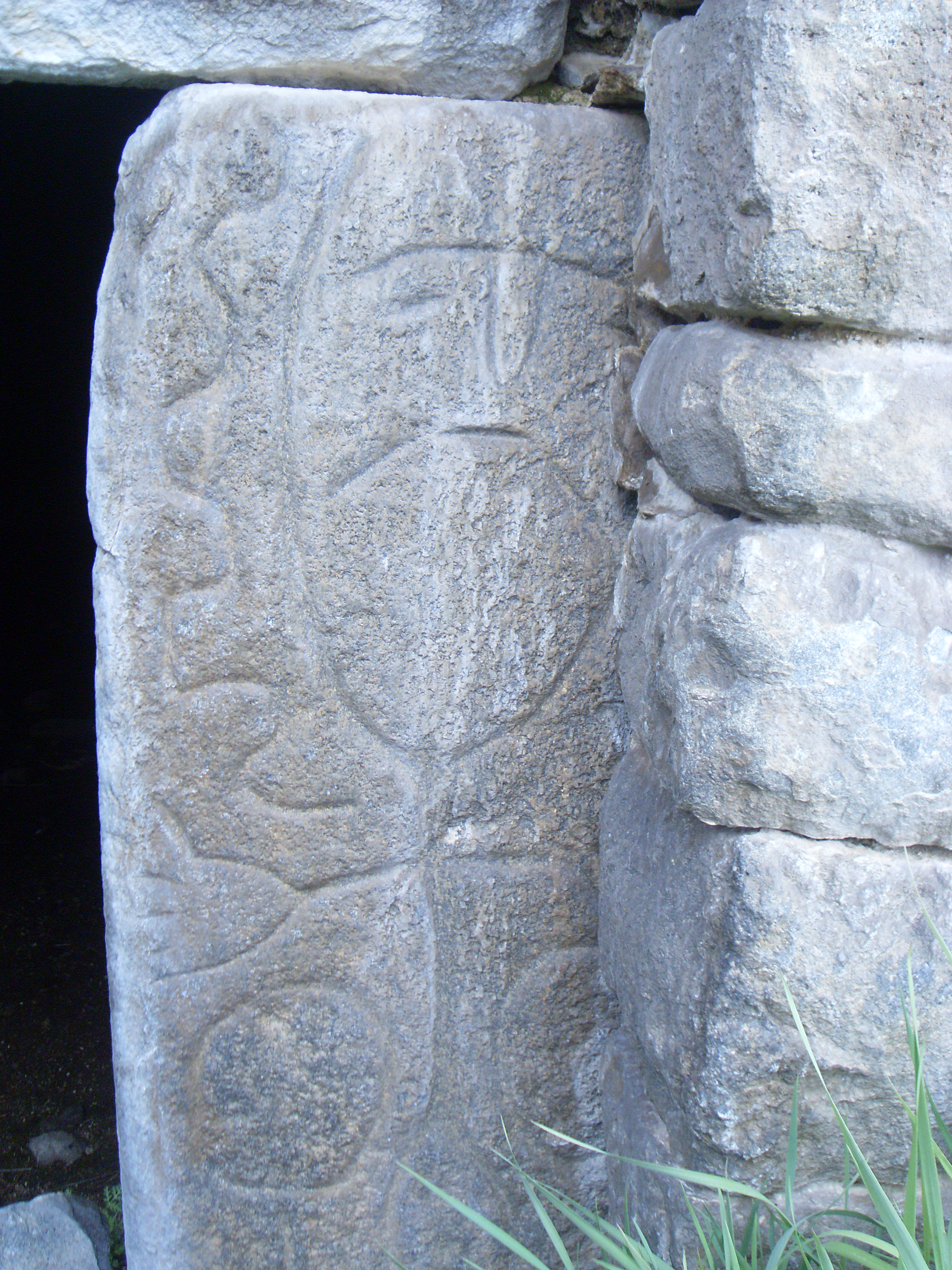
Kusanats Anapat tomb
