= Lehvaz =

Lehvaz Լեհվազ
- Location within Armenia Location within Syunik Province
- Coordinates: 38°56′41″N 46°12′37″E
- Country: Armenia
- Province: Syunik
- Municipality: Meghri

Area
  - Total: 16.87 km^{2} (6.51 sq mi)

Population (2011)
  - Total: 571
  - Density: 33.8/km^{2} (87.7/sq mi)
- Time zone: UTC+4 (AMT)

Lehvaz (Armenian: Լեհվազ) is a village in the Meghri Municipality of the Syunik Province in Armenia.

== Demographics ==
The Statistical Committee of Armenia reported its population as 605 in 2010, up from 541 at the 2001 census.
