= Vahravar =

Vahravar Վահրավար
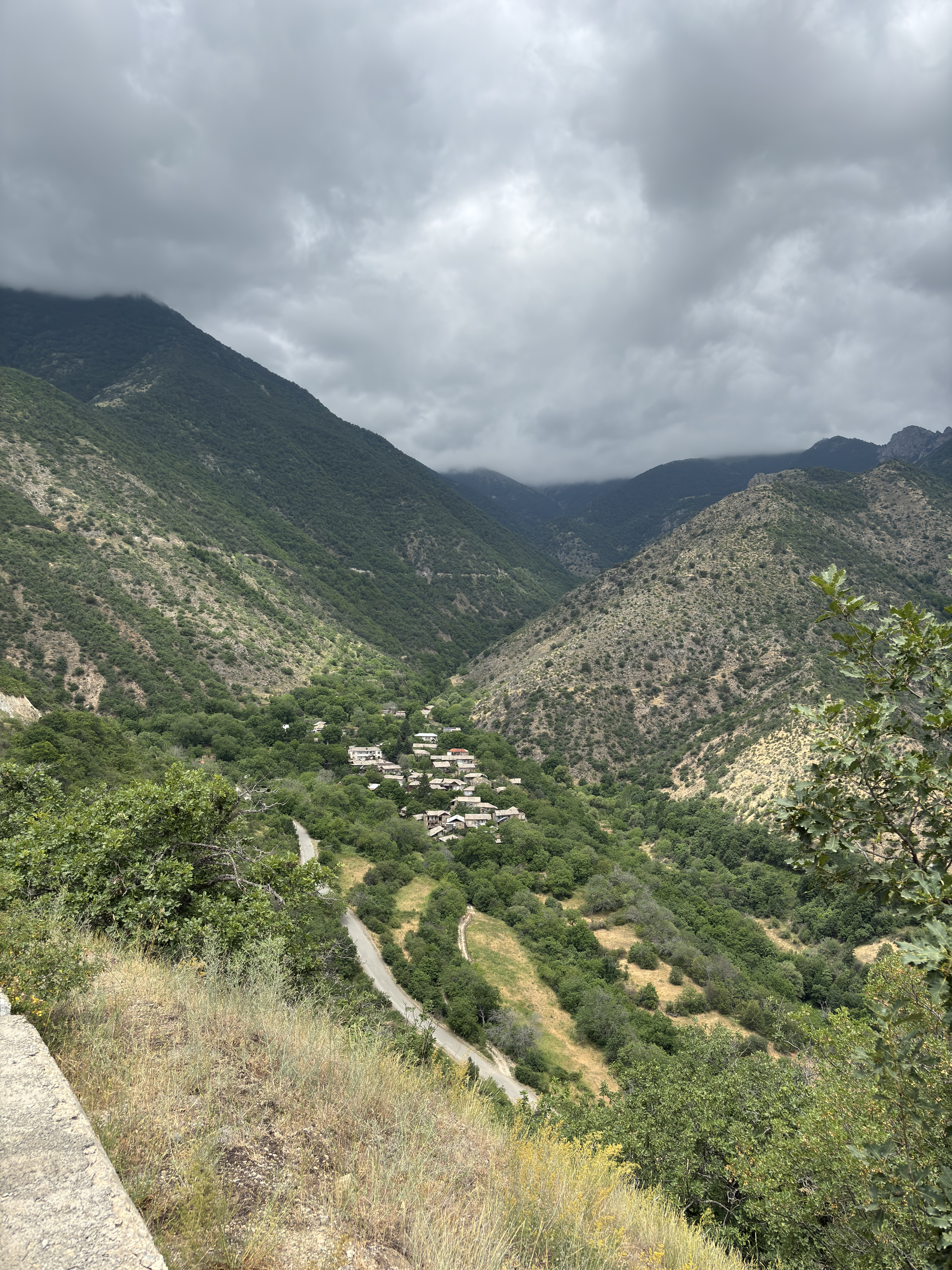

- Location within Armenia Location within Syunik Province
- Coordinates: 38°57′N 46°11′E
- Country: Armenia
- Province: Syunik
- Municipality: Meghri

Area
  - Total: 8.02 km^{2} (3.10 sq mi)

Population (2011)
  - Total: 48
  - Density: 6.0/km^{2} (16/sq mi)
- Time zone: UTC+4 (AMT)

Vahravar (Armenian: Վահրավար) is a village in the Meghri Municipality of the Syunik Province in Armenia.

== Demographics ==
The Statistical Committee of Armenia reported its population was 47 in 2010, down from 57 at the 2001 census. The inhabitants speak the Kakavaberd dialect of Armenian.

== Gallery ==
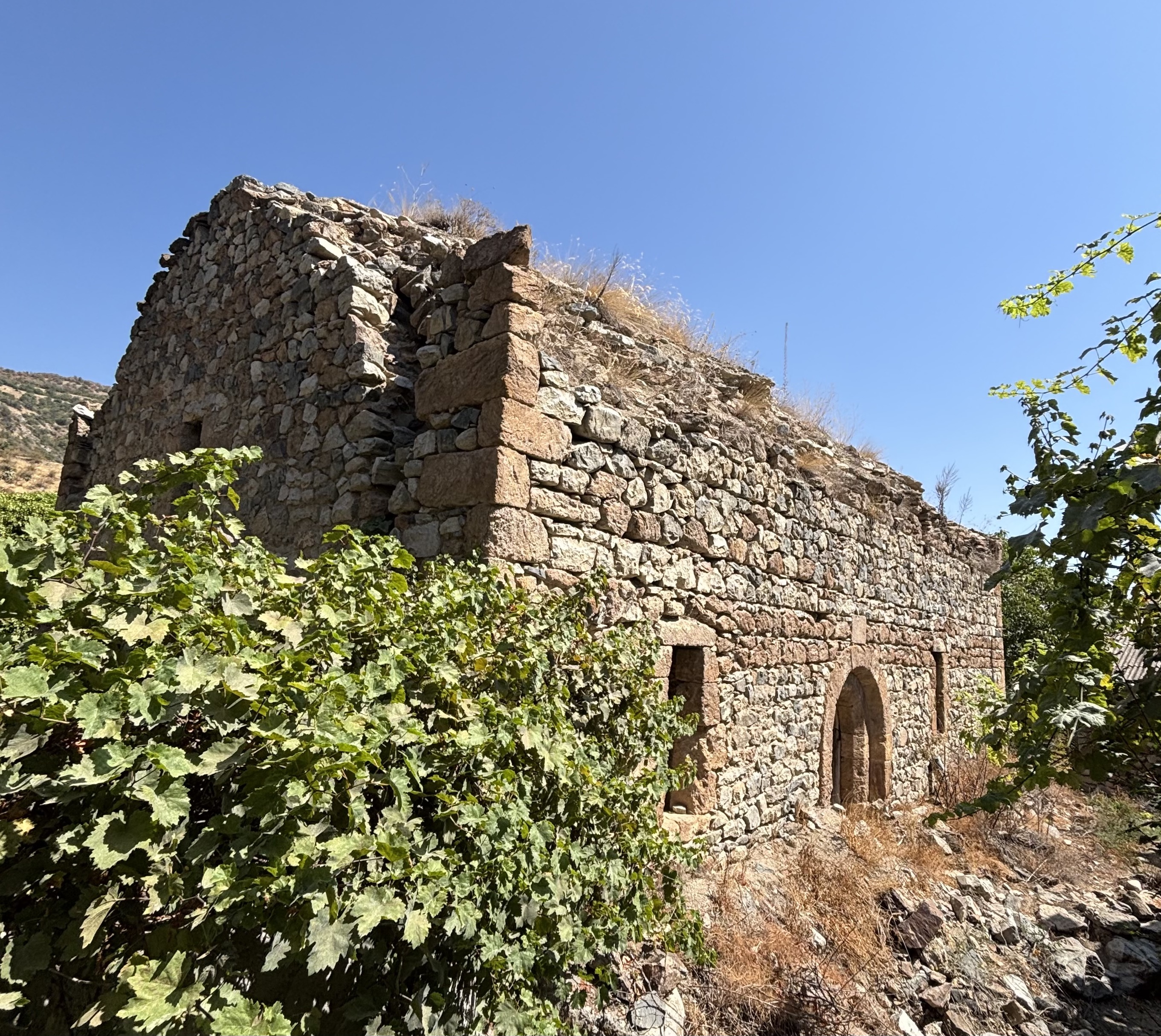
Surb Gevorg Church

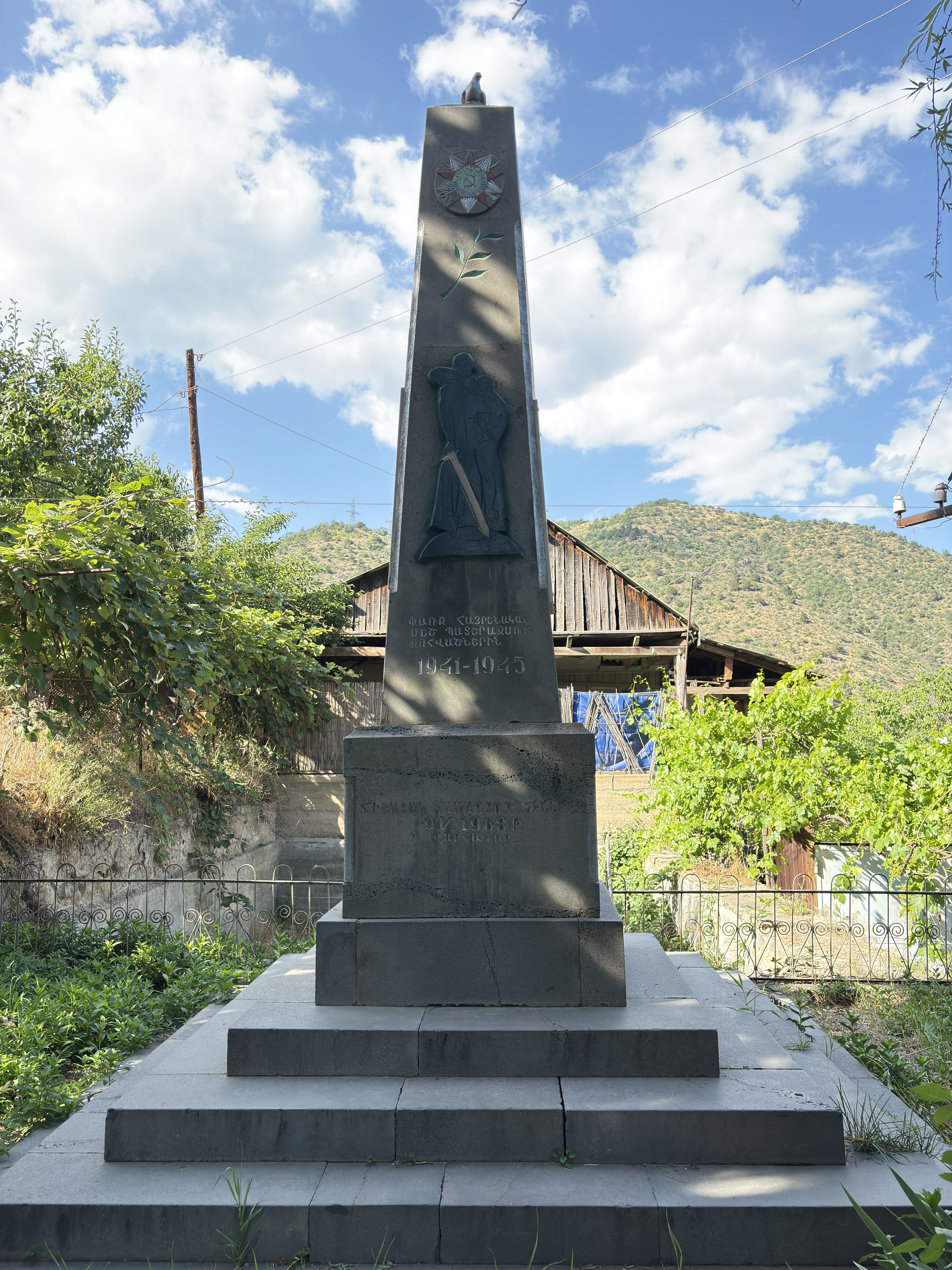
WWII monument in Vahravar

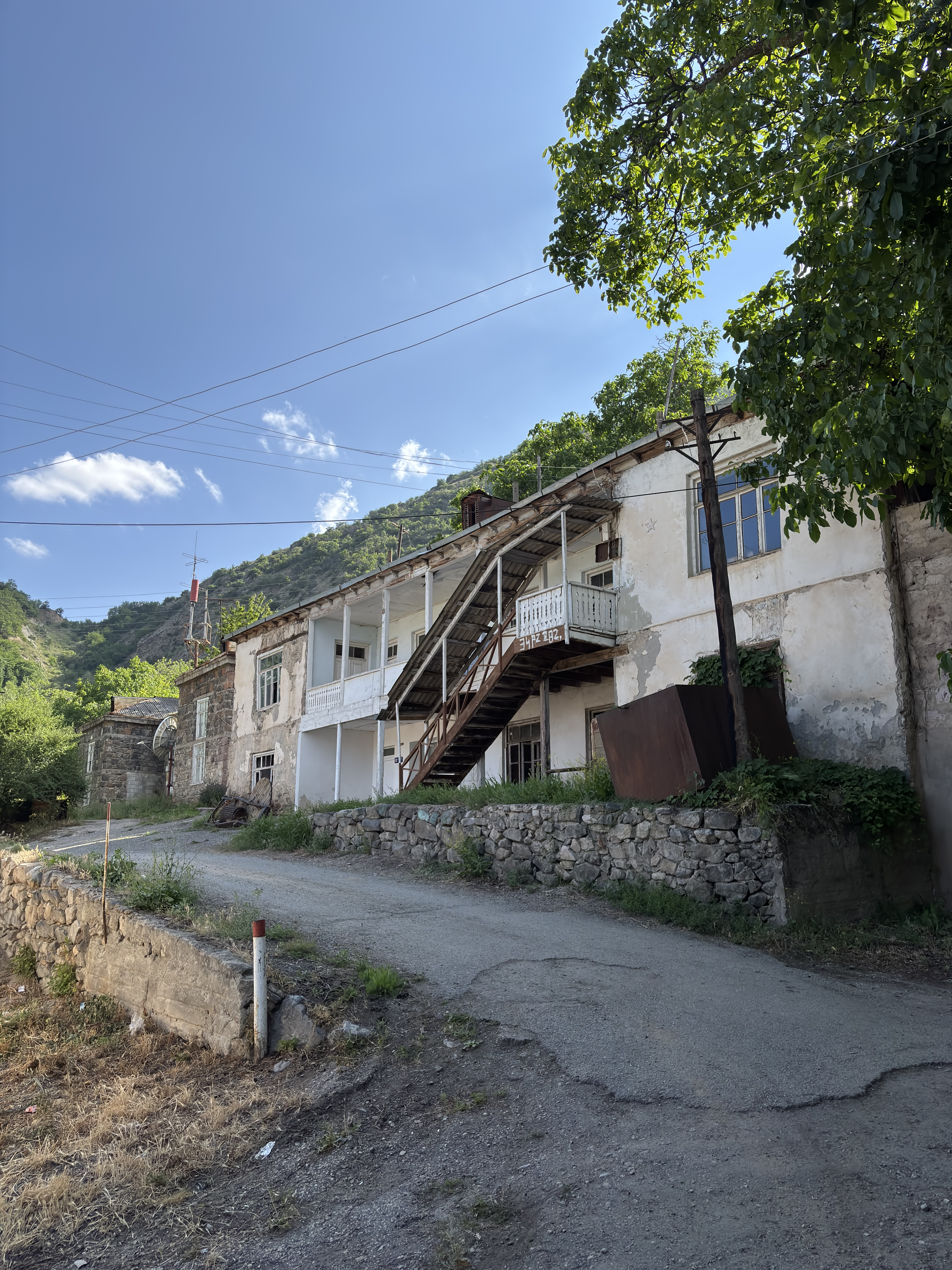

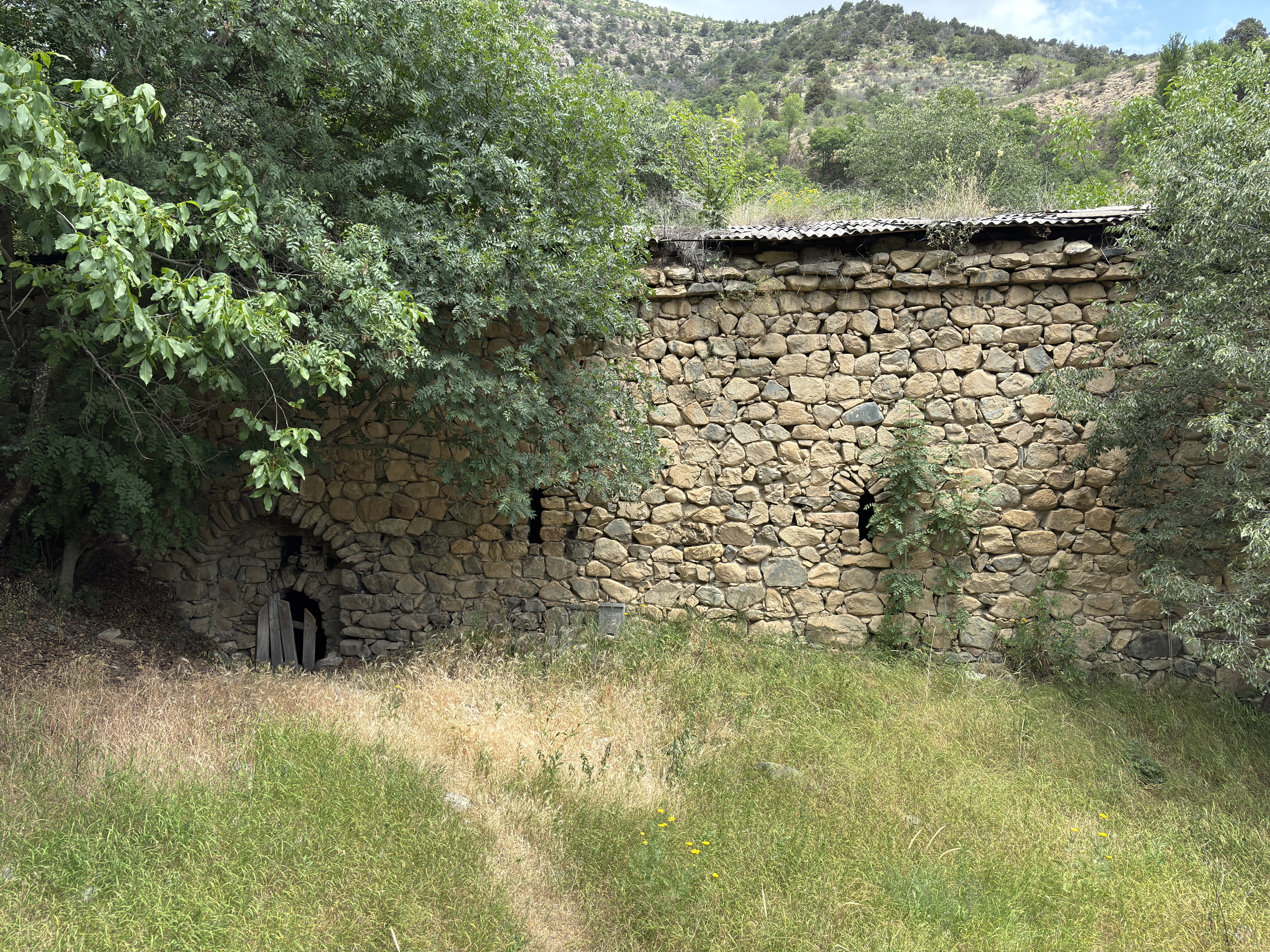
