= Gudemnis =

Gudemnis Գուդեմնիս
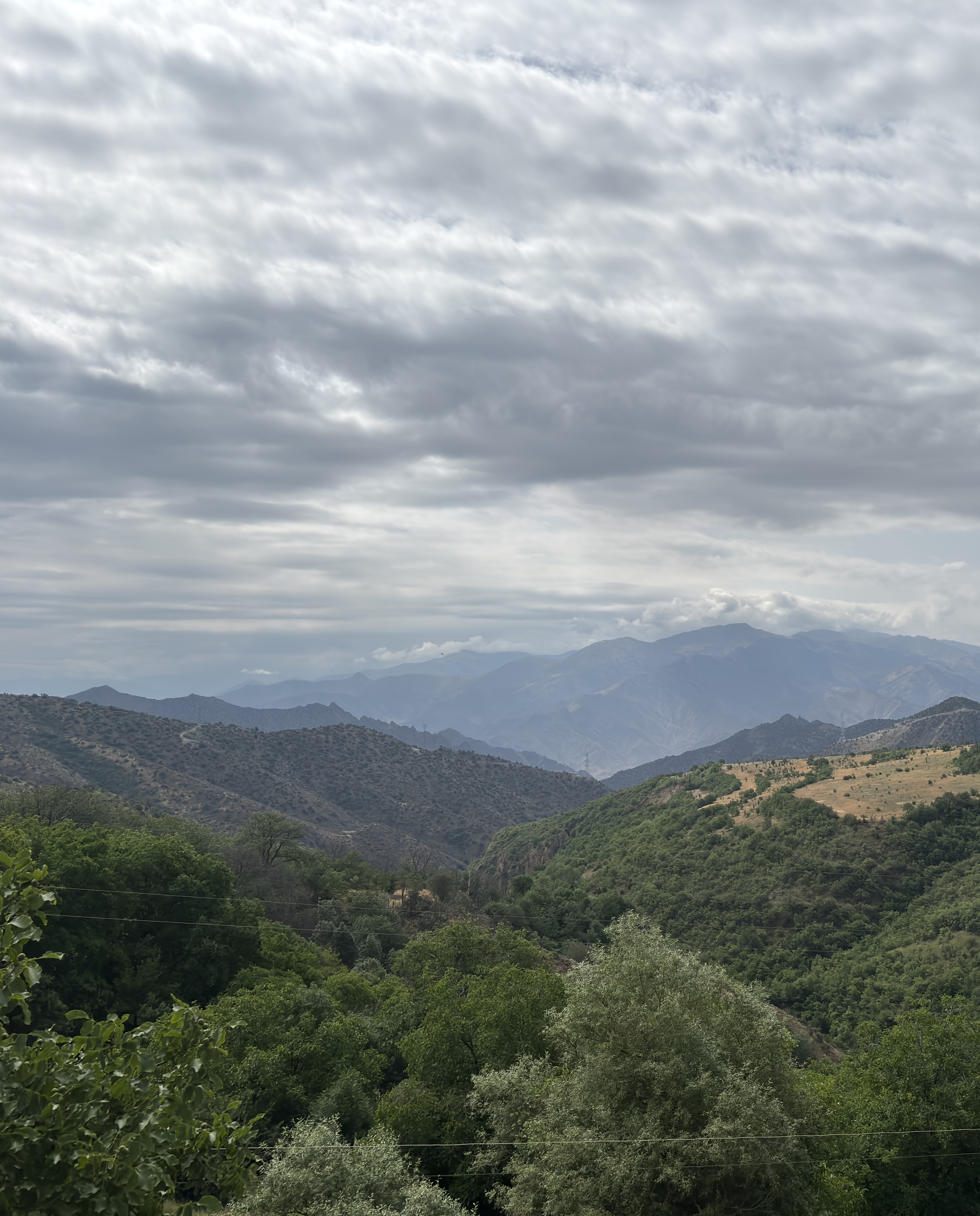

- Location within Armenia Location within Syunik Province
- Coordinates: 38°56′N 46°11′E
- Country: Armenia
- Province: Syunik
- Municipality: Meghri

Area
  - Total: 15.58 km^{2} (6.02 sq mi)

Population (2011)
  - Total: 21
  - Density: 1.3/km^{2} (3.5/sq mi)
- Time zone: UTC+4 (AMT)

Gudemnis (Armenian: Գուդեմնիս) is a village in the Meghri Municipality of the Syunik Province in Armenia.

== Geography ==
The vicinity of the village is designated as the "Gudemnis" Prime Butterfly Area by the Butterfly Conservation Armenia organization, since there are number of species of National and Global Conservation Concern. Those include: Carcharodus lavatherae, Parnassius mnemosyne, Colias aurorina, Chazara briseis, Tomares romanovi, Pseudophilotes vicrama, Phengaris arion, and others.

== Demographics ==
The Statistical Committee of Armenia reported its population as 39 in 2010, down from 66 at the 2001 census. The inhabitants speak the Kakavaberd dialect of Armenian.

== Gallery ==
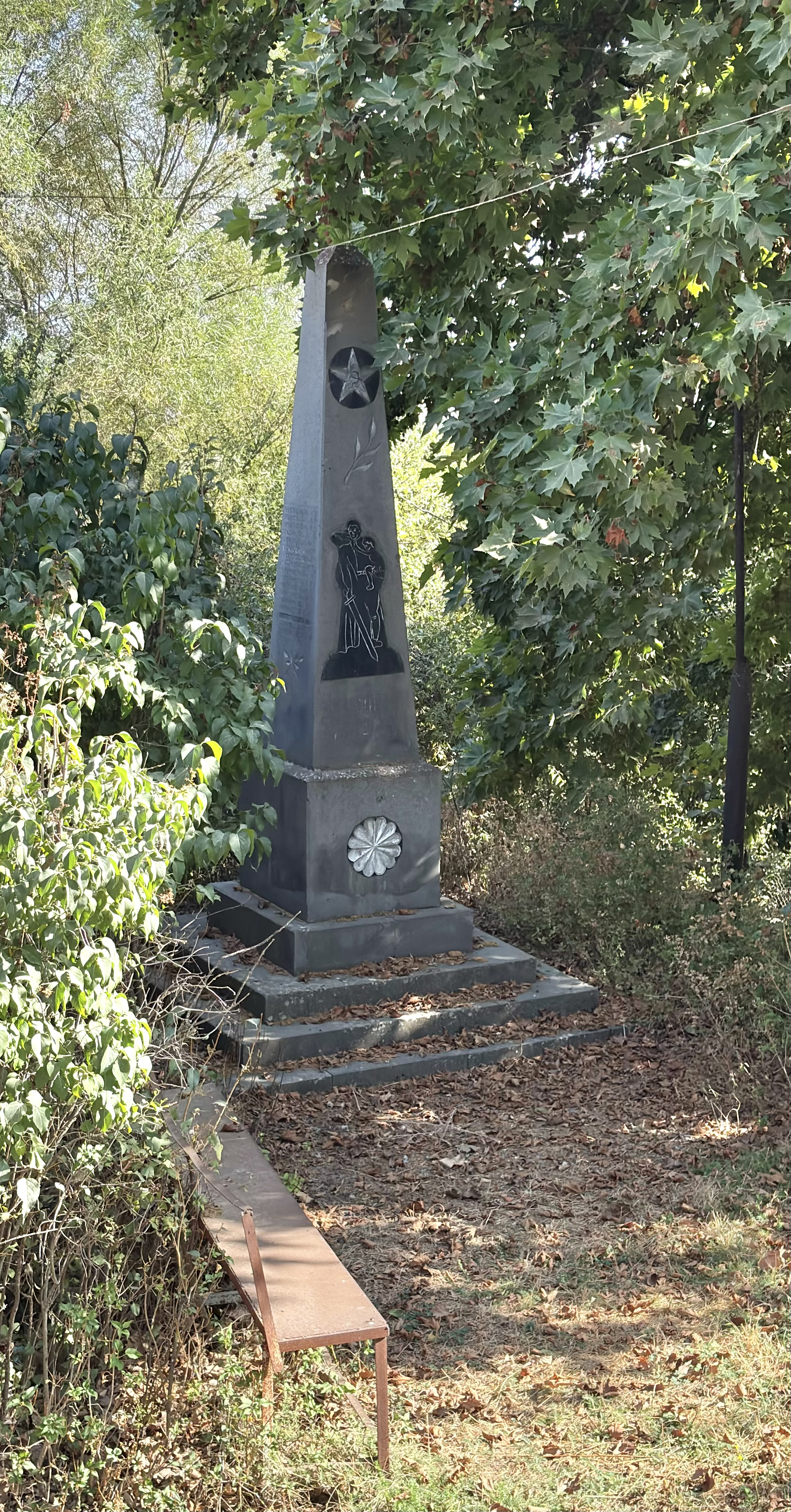
WWII monument in Gudemnis

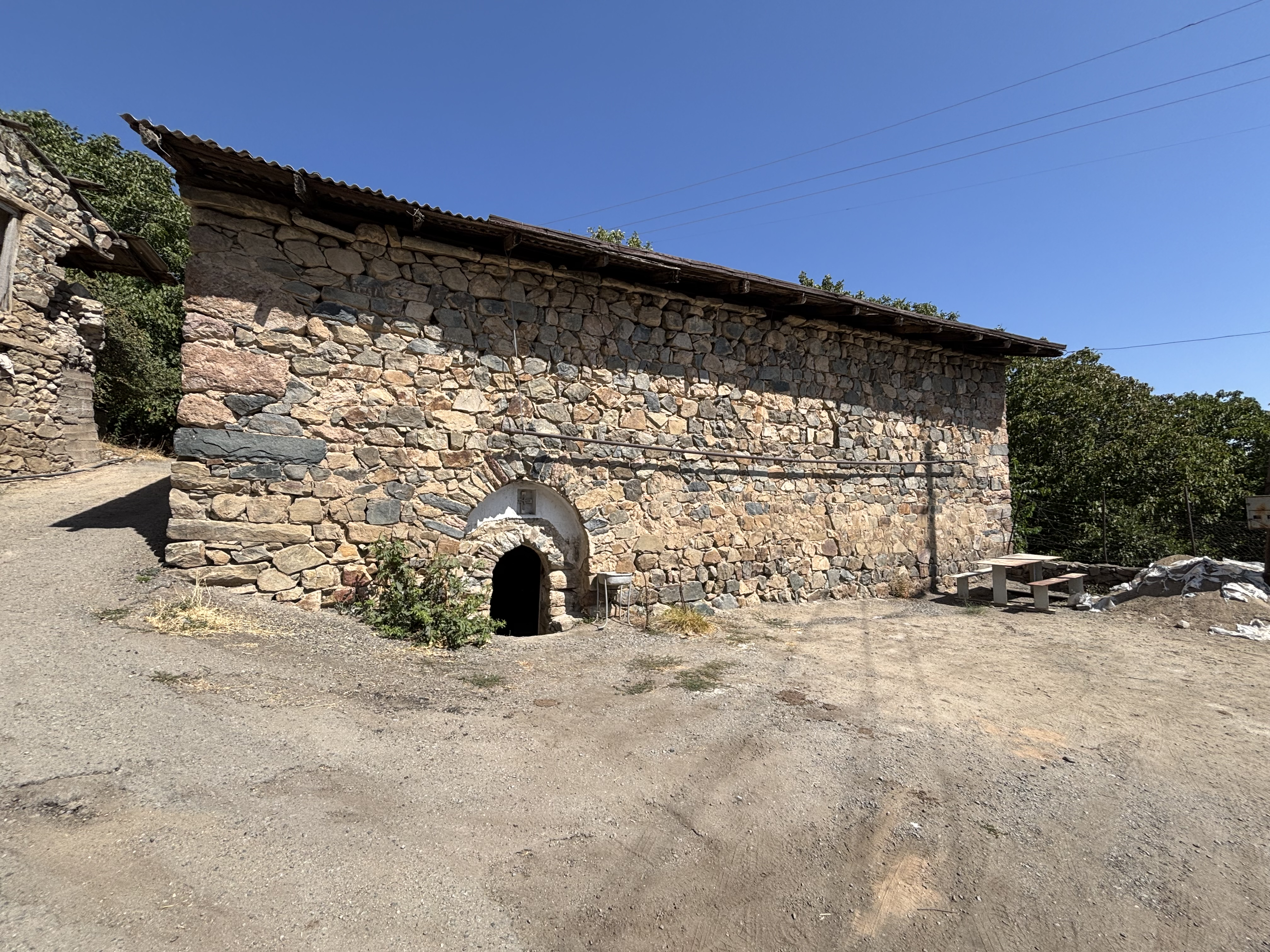
