= Aygedzor, Syunik =

Aygedzor Այգեձոր
- Location within Armenia Location within Syunik Province
- Coordinates: 38°58′43″N 46°12′26″E
- Country: Armenia
- Province: Syunik
- Municipality: Meghri

Population (2011)
  - Total: 9
- Time zone: UTC+4 (AMT)

Aygedzor (Armenian: Այգեձոր) is a village in the Meghri Municipality of the Syunik Province in Armenia.

== Demographics ==
The Statistical Committee of Armenia reported its population was 17 at the 2001 census.
