= Shvanidzor =

Shvanidzor Շվանիձոր
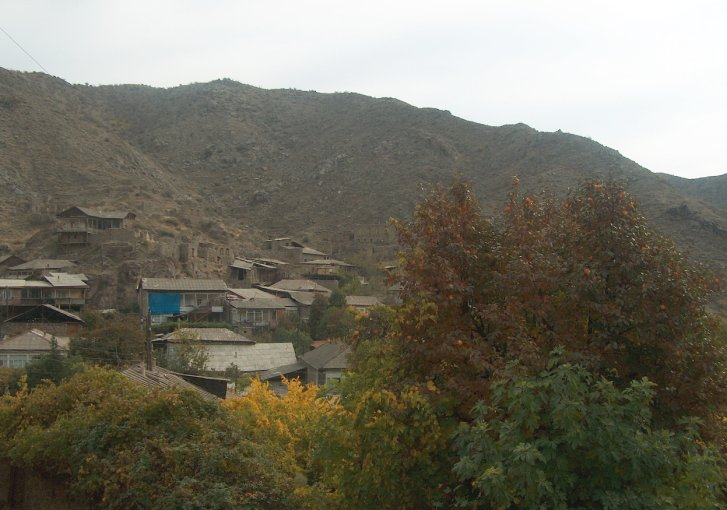

- Location within Armenia Location within Syunik Province
- Coordinates: 38°56′34″N 46°22′37″E
- Country: Armenia
- Province: Syunik
- Municipality: Meghri

Area
  - Total: 42.22 km^{2} (16.30 sq mi)

Population (2011)
  - Total: 312
  - Density: 7.39/km^{2} (19.1/sq mi)
- Time zone: UTC+4 (AMT)

Shvanidzor (Armenian: Շվանիձոր, pronounced [ˈʃvɑnidzɔɾ]) is a village in the Meghri Municipality of the Syunik Province in southeastern Armenia, near Armenia's border with Iran.

== Toponymy ==
The village was also known as Shirvanadzor (Շիրվանաձոր) and Astazor (Աստազոր).

== History ==
According to local historical sources, Shvanidzor was founded in the 13th century, and at the time counted more than 700 households, and was located in the place of the historic settlement of Areviq. The lands of the community were cultivated for more than 700 years, which resulted in the formation of agricultural landscapes. Due to the lack of irrigation and lowland fertility, the community was relocated several times. In the vicinity of the village, there are numerous remnants of 17th- and 18th-century dwellings.

The community is known for its medieval kahrezes (qanat), a system of underground water channels and intake facilities. These deep channels are located 50-60m from each other. There are 5 kahrezes in Shvanidzor. Four of them were constructed in the 12th-14th centuries, even before the village was founded. The fifth kahrez was constructed in 2005. Potable water runs through the first, the second and the fifth kahrezes. Kahrez III and IV are in a quite poor condition. In the summer, especially in July and August, the amount of water reaches its minimum, creating a critical situation in the water supply system.

== Culture ==
Shvanidzor is famous for its historical monuments. Close to the community there is an old bridge (17th century), as well as Gyumerants, St. Stepanos (17th-19th centuries), Berdikar (12th-13th century) churches and the Baba-Hadji Mausoleum (17th century). There is also an aqueduct of 16th century. This currently functioning aqueduct is the most important historical monument of such type remaining from the medieval times in Armenia.

Having a long history, Shvanidzor has preserved several specific traditions and rituals. The most celebrated holidays were Easter, Palm Sunday, Wine Blessing etc. Pilgrimage was also quite spread among the inhabitants. For many centuries Shvanidzor has been a residence of meliks, which is reflected in many legends and traditions.

The community members were traditionally engaged in hunting, fishing, animal husbandry, gardening, winery. Part of the community were skillful craftsmen, especially smiths, tailors, carpenters, masons, mat weavers etc.

== Demographics ==
The Statistical Committee of Armenia reported its population was 306 in 2010, down from 330 at the 2001 census. The population is mainly engaged in agriculture, animal husbandry and beekeeping.

== Geography and nature ==
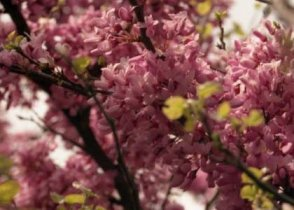
European rosebud (Judas tree)

The distance from Shvanidzor to Yerevan is 410 km (250 mi), the distance to Kapan, the regional center is 102 km (63 mi), the distance to the main highway is 17 km (11 mi) and the distance to the newly built Tsav-Shikahogh highway (which is an alternative route to Iran) is 700 m (2,300 ft).

Community lands stretch from 450 to 2,864 m (1,476 to 9,396 ft), on the southern slopes of the Meghri mountain range (the Tsav-Shvanidzor pass), whereas the settlement itself is located in the forested area at the bottom, at 630 to 760 m (2,070 to 2,490 ft) above sea level, in the Astghadzor (Astazor) gorge.

Shvanidzor is located 10 km away from Shikahogh State Preserve. Vicinity of the village have been designated as Prime Butterfly Area.

=== Flora ===
Shvanidzor is located in dry tropics. The indicators of tropics are wild pomegranate, wild fig and numerous other plants. The majority of the plants are xerophile, represented by xeromorphous shrubs. Green leafy plants are represented by araxian (Quercus araxina) and oriental oak (Q. macranthera), Georgian maple (Acer ibericum), as well as plane-tree, ash-tree, beech etc. Shvanidzor and its vicinities are the only places in the South Caucasus, where two types of European redbud (Judas tree) grow - Cercis griffithii and С. siliquastrum. Dry alpine meadows are covered with scarce shrubs and remind of desert. However, there are numerous wild herbs, including officinal, edible as well as wild relatives of cultivated plants.

=== Fauna ===
The mammals living in the area include Caucasian bear (Ursus arctos syriacus), Bezoarian goat (Capra aegagrus aegagrus), Armenian mouflon (Ovis orientalis gmelinii), Persian leopard (Panthera pardus tullianus), as well as badger, lynx, wild boar, roe deer, which are listed in the Red Book. Apart from that there are also long-eared hedgehogs and 3 types of bats that are listed as endangered. Hunting and poaching still causes harm to these species, though from mammals, it is only allowed to hunt fox and hare.

Out of 66 species of birds listed in the Red Book, 15 can be met in Shvanidzor, which are Acciper brevipes, Circaetus gallicus, Aquila rapax orientalis, Aquila chrysaetos fulva, Gypaetus barbatus aereus, Gyps fulvus, Merops superciliosus persicus, Sylvia hortensis crassirostris, Oenanthe xanthoprimna chrysopygia, Monticola saxalitis, Luscinia svecica occidentalis, Remiz pendulinus menzbieri, and Parus lugubris.

Seven types of reptiles from the 11 in the Red Book can be met in Shvanidzor: Testudo graeca, Eumeces schneiderii, Mabuya aurata, Rhynchocalamus melanocephalus, Telescopus fallax ibericus, Zamenis hohenackeri, and Montivipera raddei.

== Gallery ==
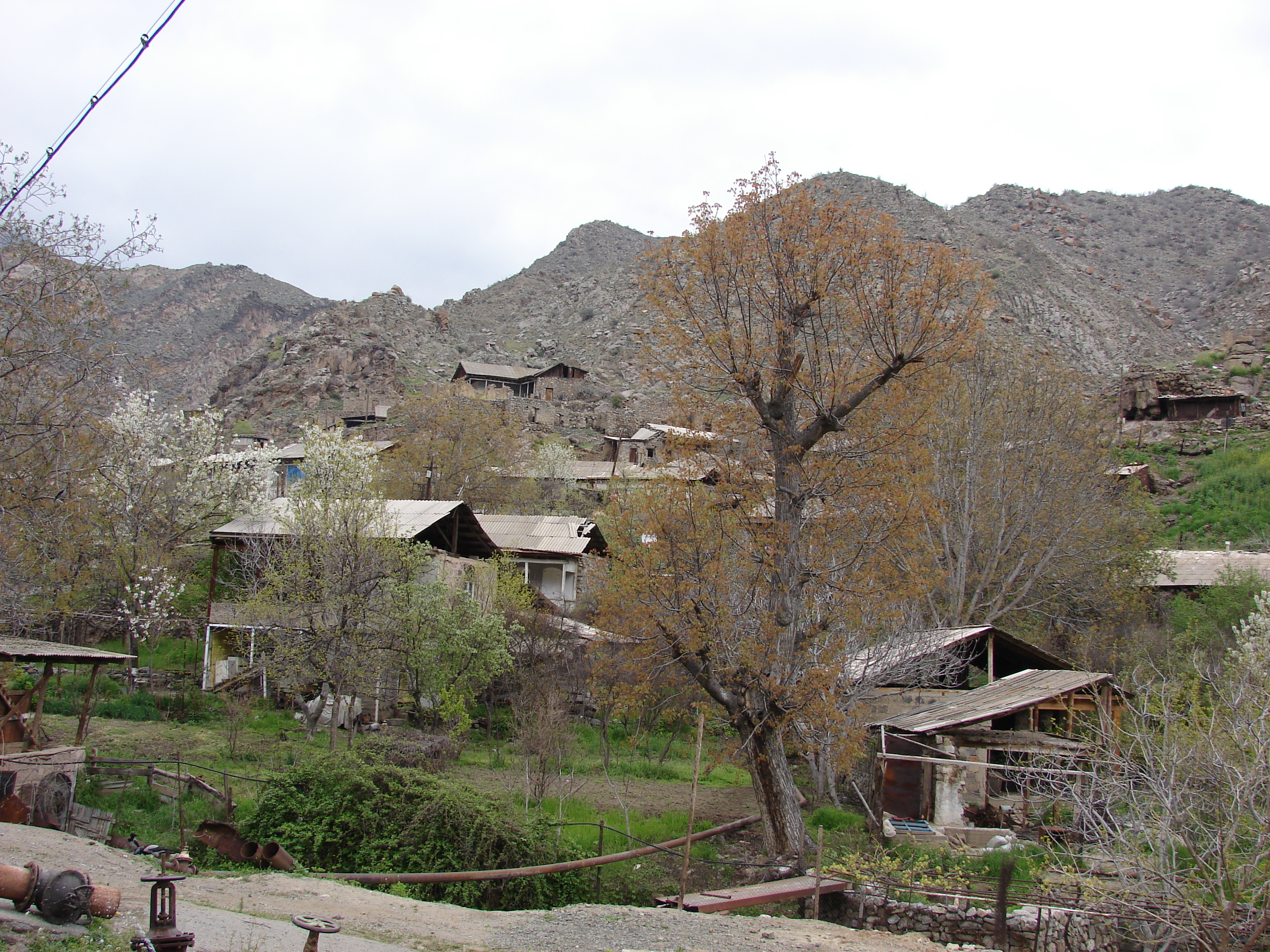
A view of the village

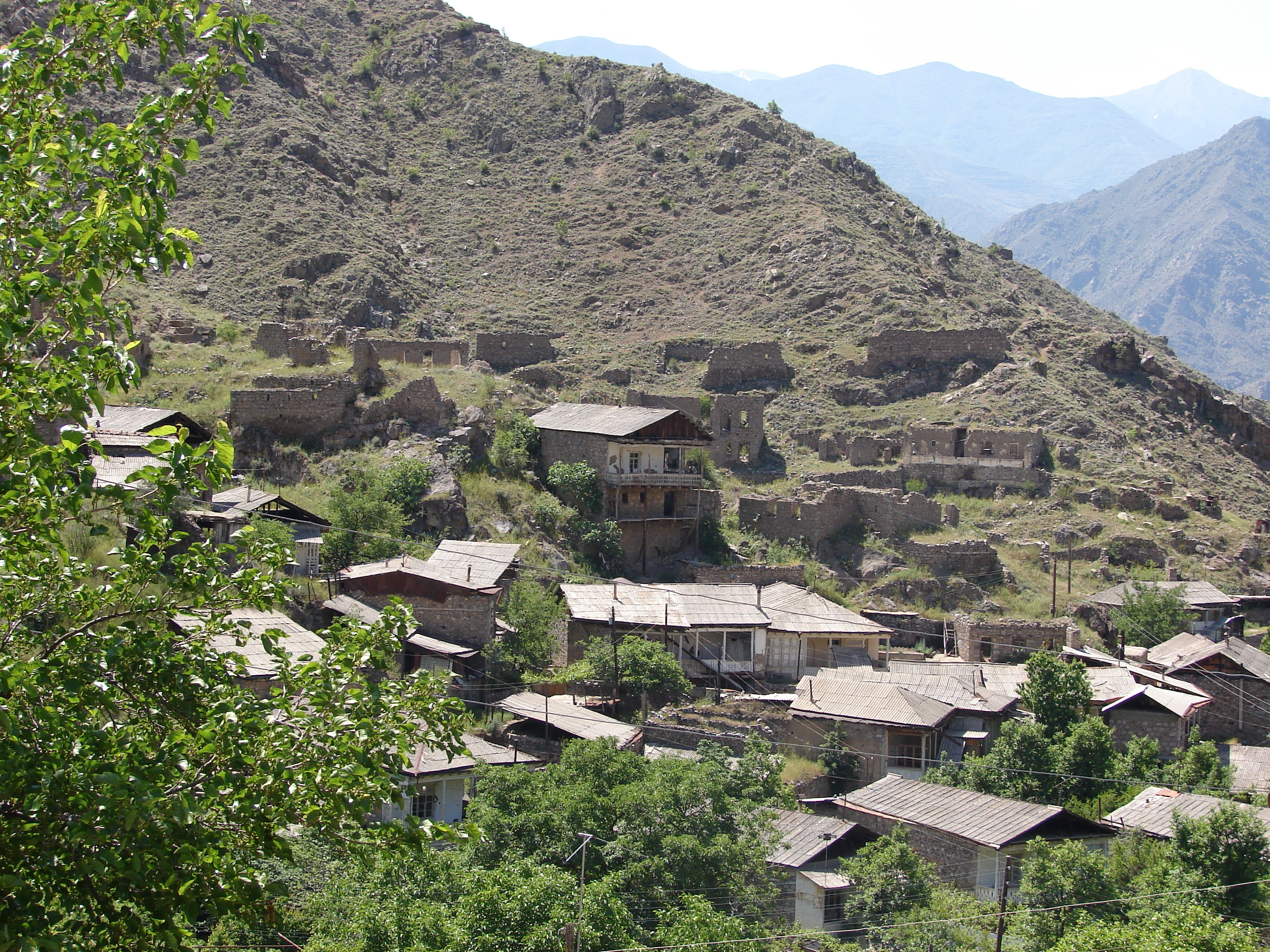
A view of the village

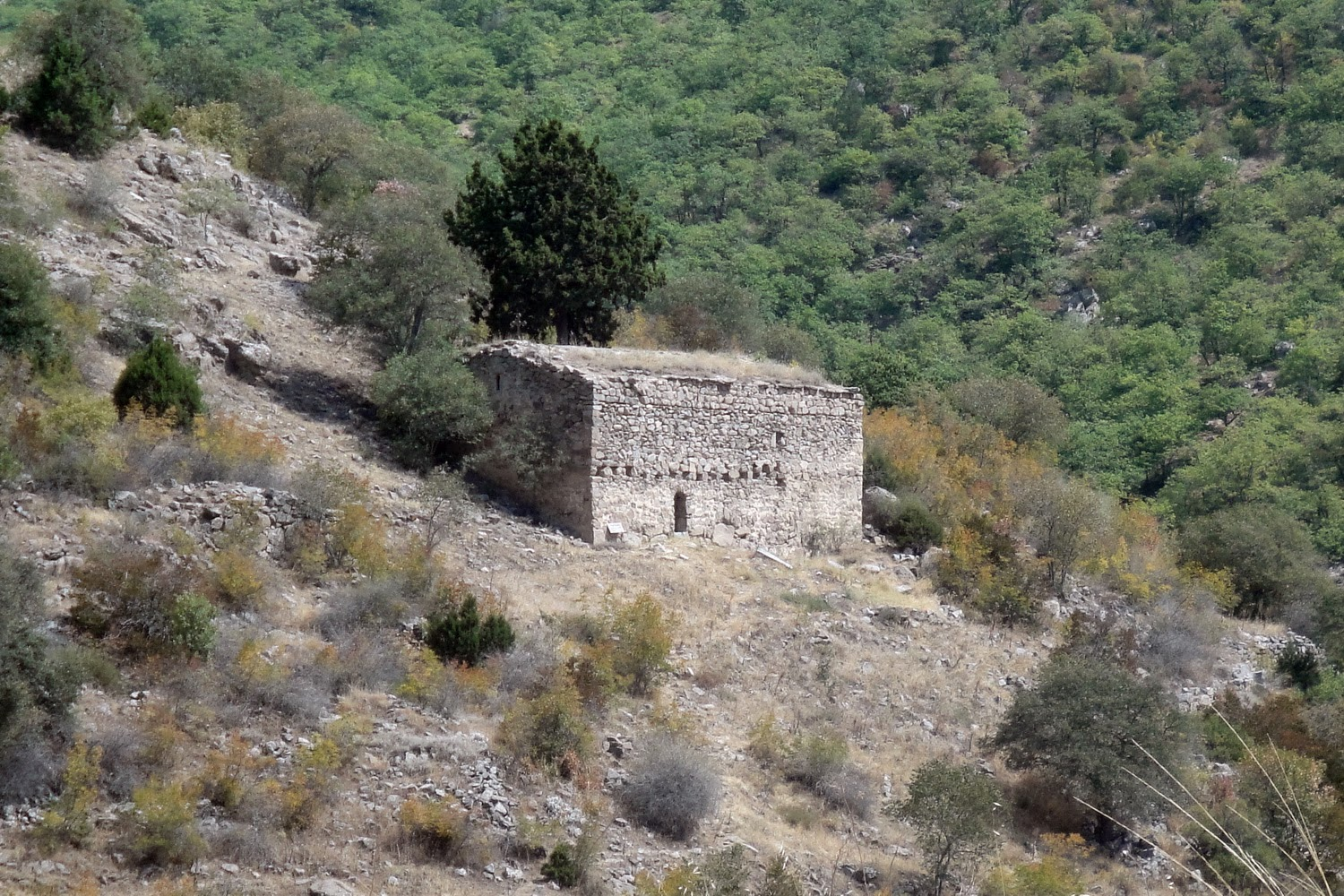
Church in Shvanidzor

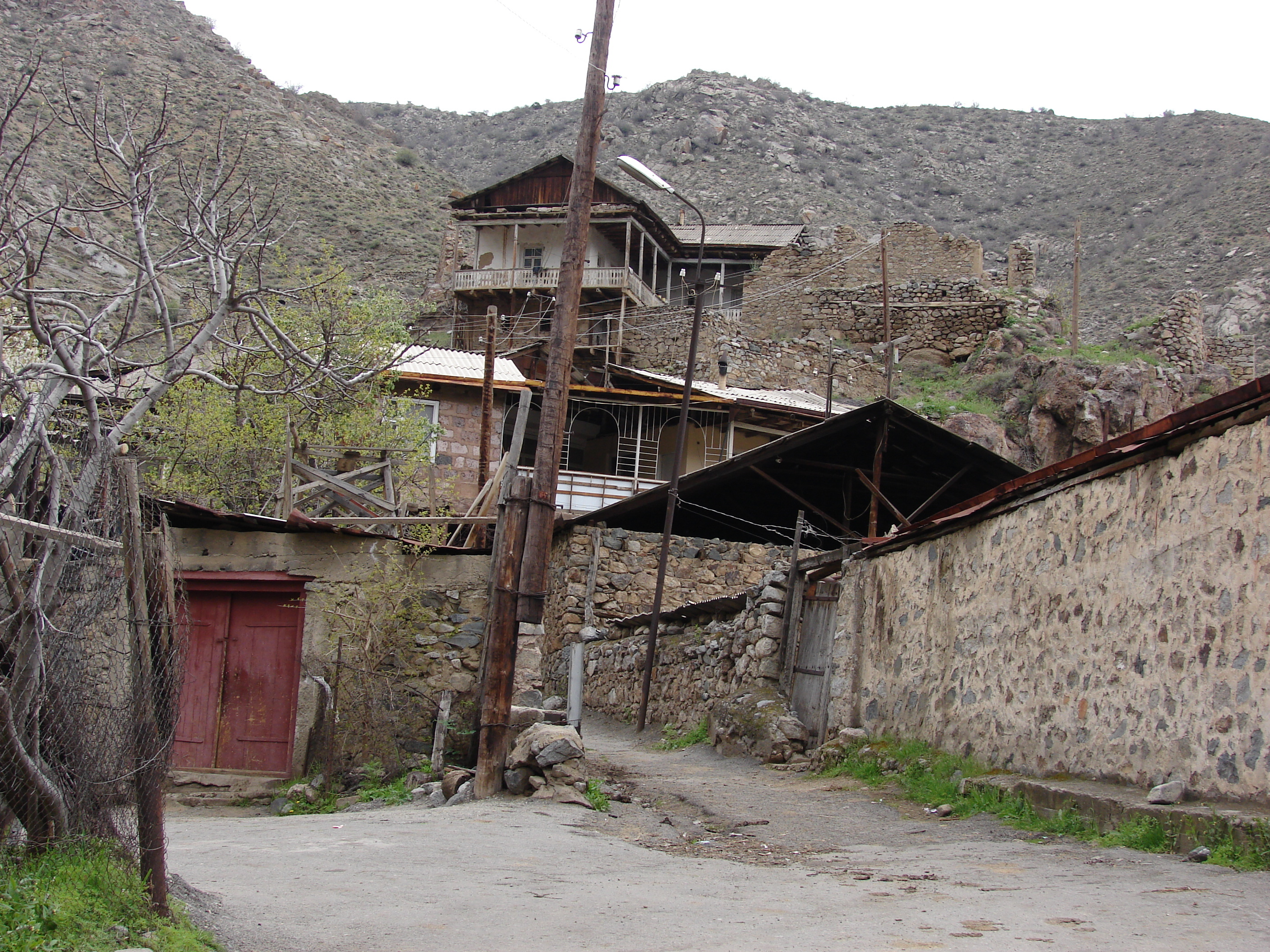
A view of the village

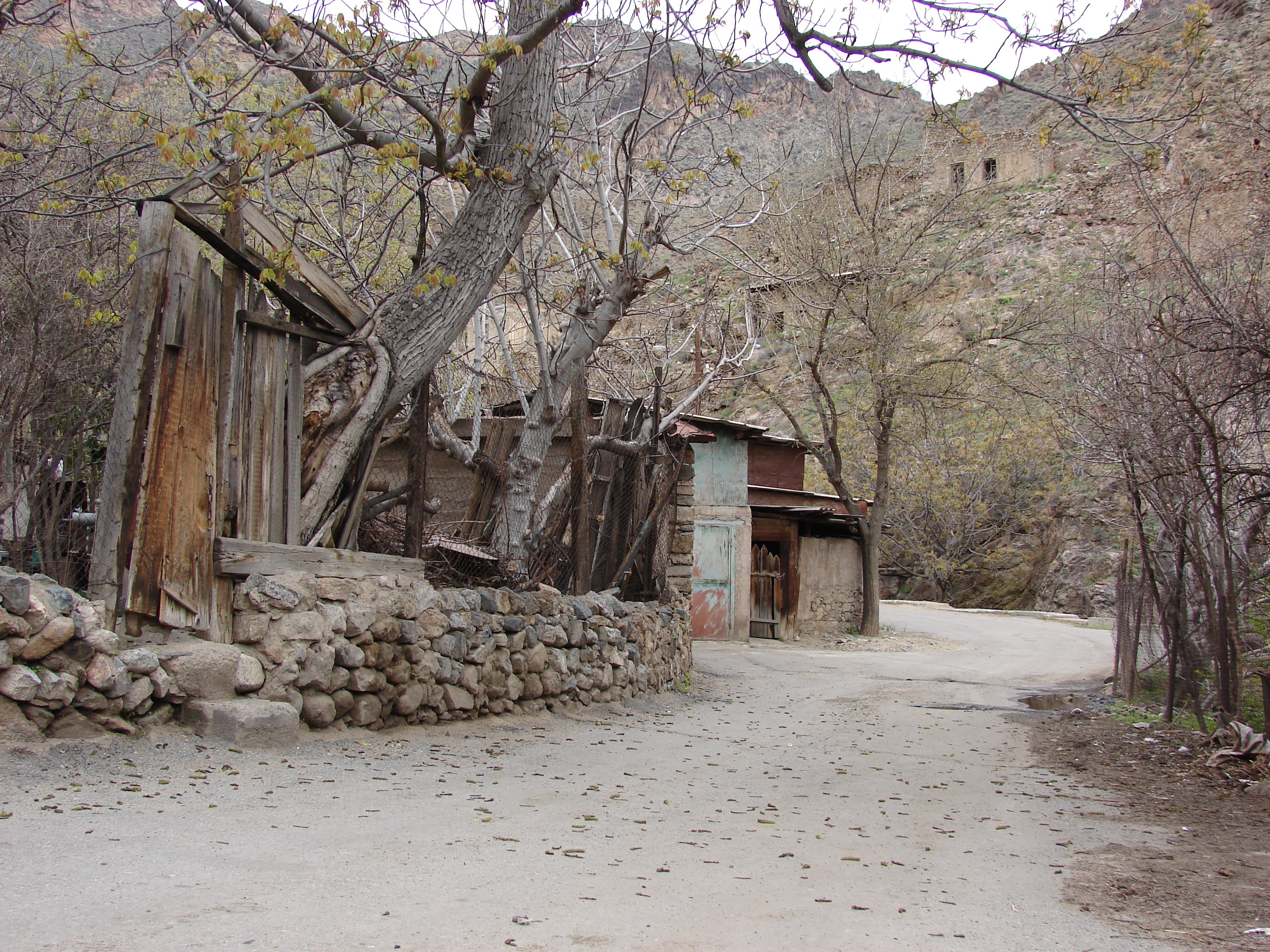
A view of the village

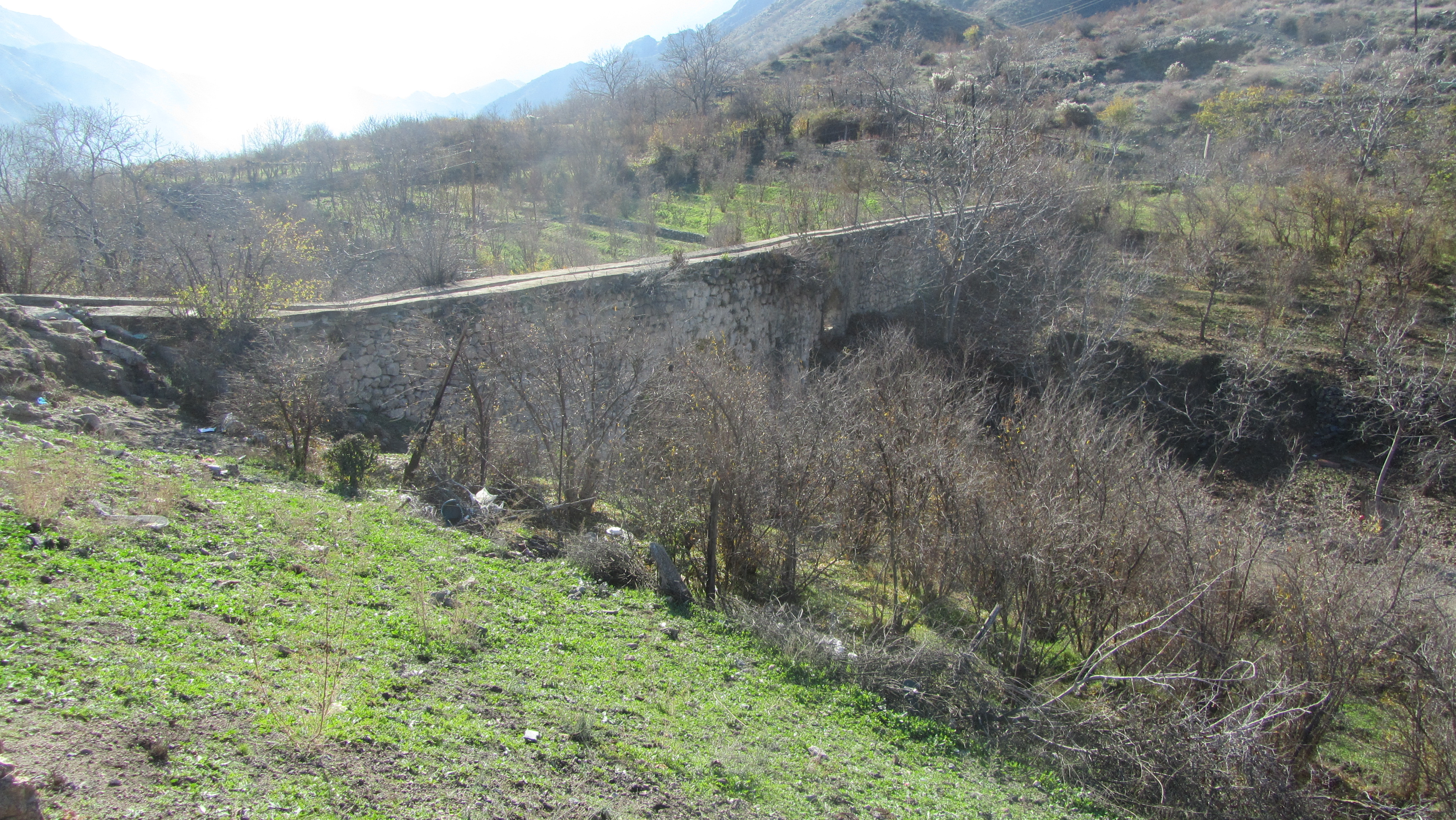
Qanat in Shvanidzor

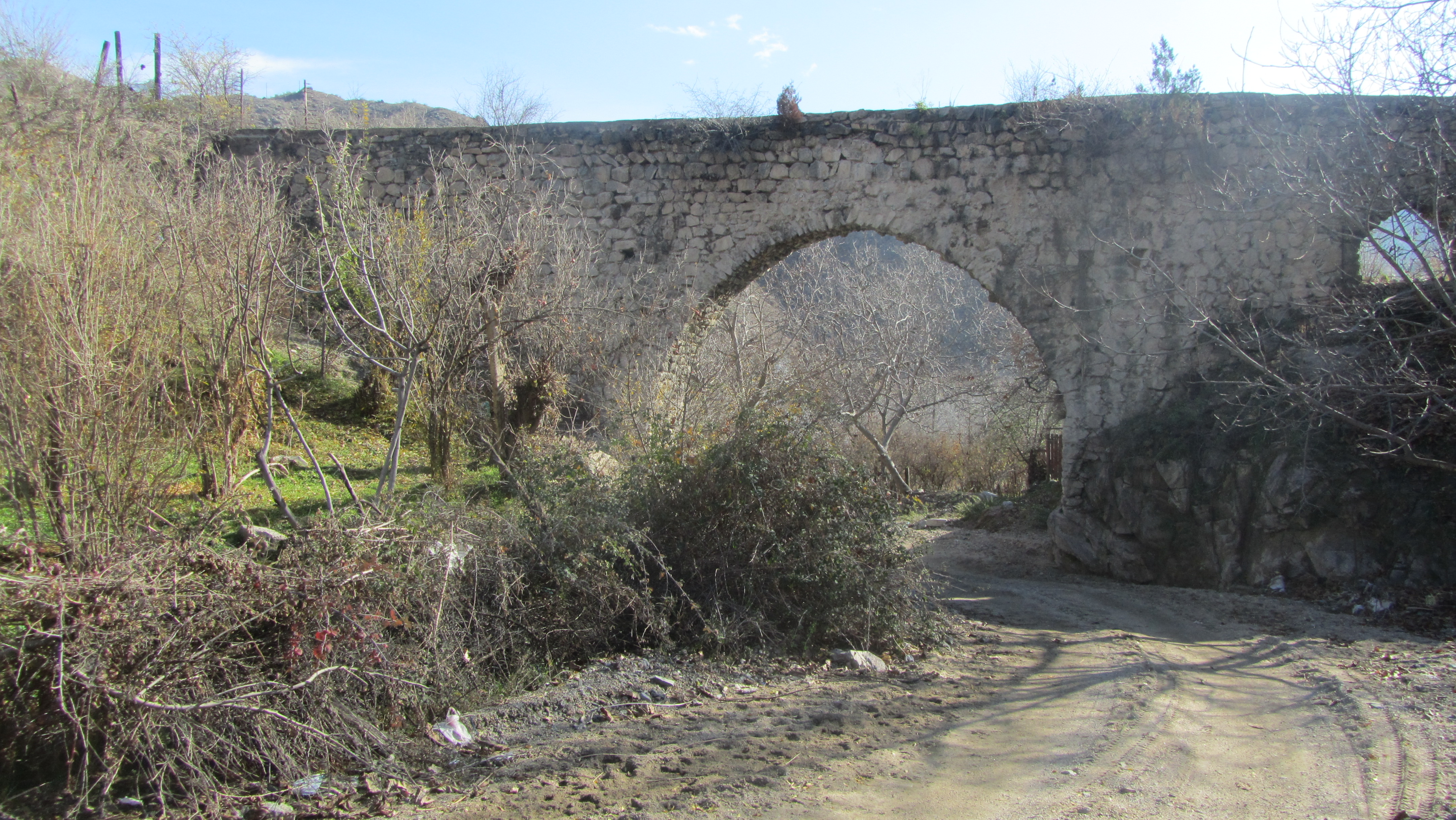
Qanat in Shvanidzor

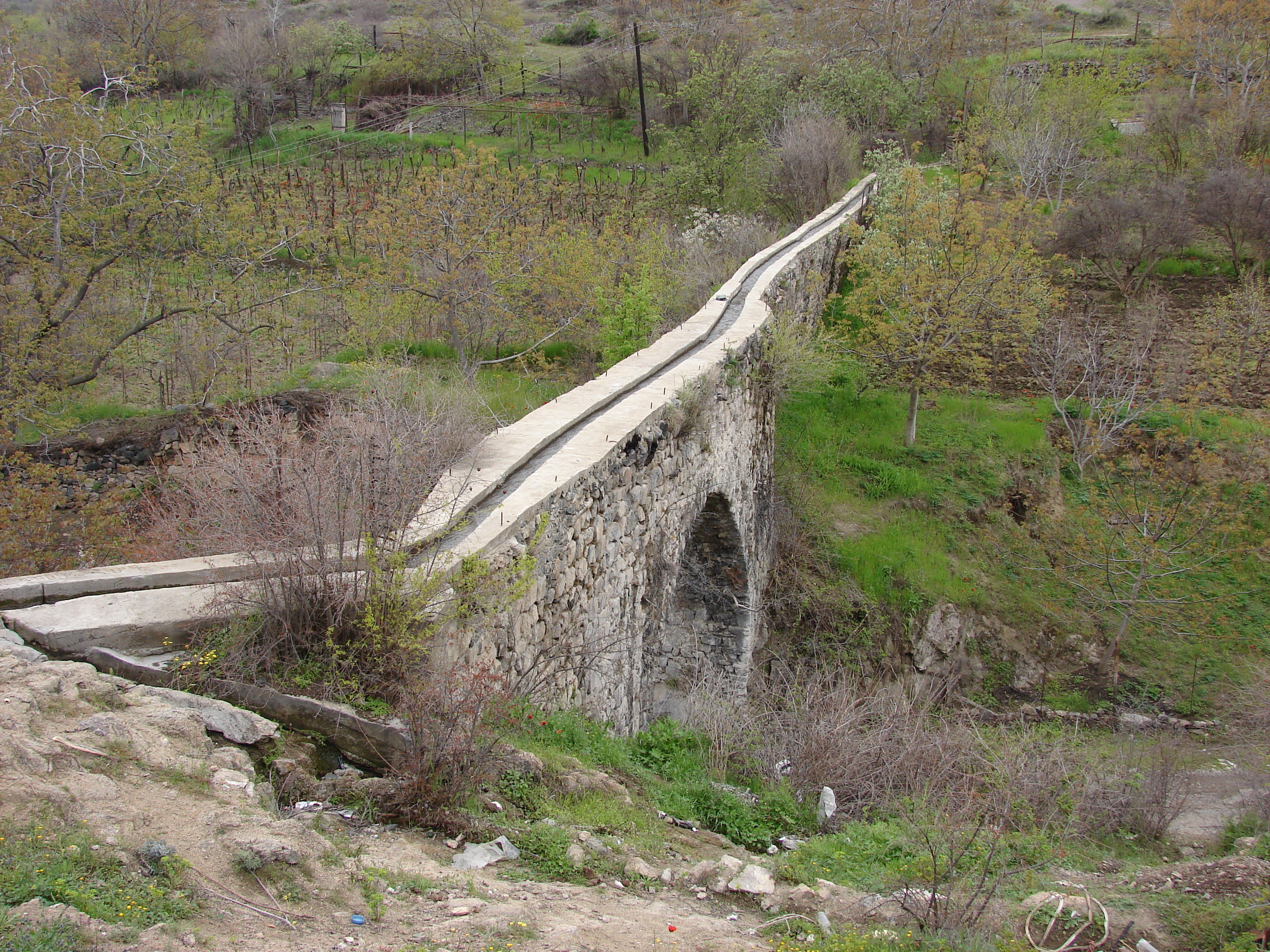
Qanat in Shvanidzor
