= Tkhkut =

Tkhkut Թխկուտ
- Location within Armenia Location within Syunik Province
- Coordinates: 38°59′01″N 46°14′00″E
- Country: Armenia
- Province: Syunik
- Municipality: Meghri

Population (2011)
  - Total: 69
- Time zone: UTC+4 (AMT)

Tkhkut (Armenian: Թխկուտ) is a village in the Meghri Municipality of the Syunik Province in Armenia.

== Demographics ==
The Statistical Committee of Armenia reported its population was 49 at the 2001 census.
