= Nrnadzor =

Nrnadzor Նռնաձոր
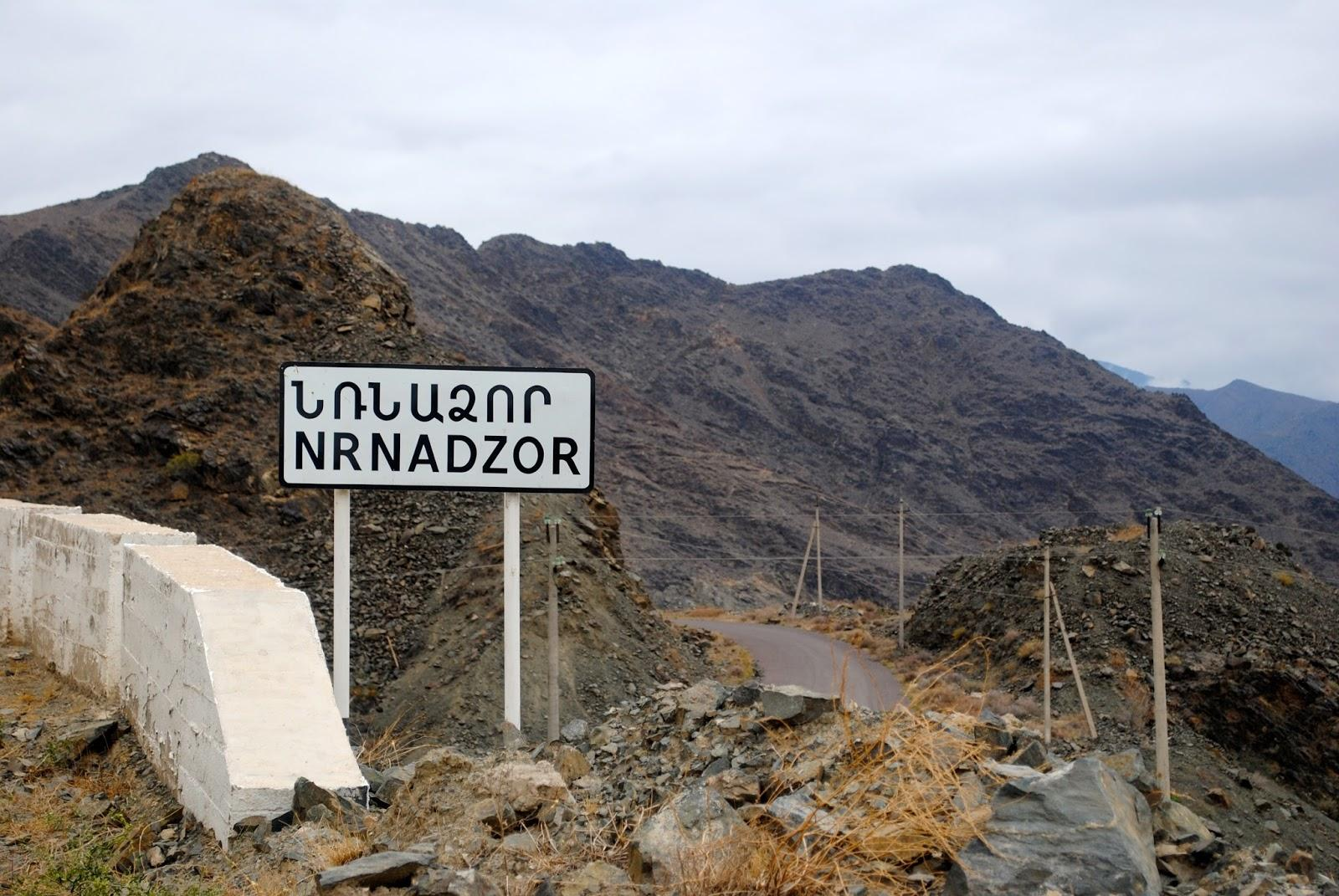

- Location within Armenia Location within Syunik Province
- Coordinates: 38°54′57″N 46°26′32″E
- Country: Armenia
- Province: Syunik
- Municipality: Meghri

Area
  - Total: 118.61 km^{2} (45.80 sq mi)

Population (2011)
  - Total: 148
  - Density: 1.25/km^{2} (3.23/sq mi)
- Time zone: UTC+4 (AMT)

Nrnadzor (Armenian: Նռնաձոր) is a village in the Meghri Municipality of the Syunik Province in Armenia, on the bank of the Aras River.

== Toponymy ==
The village of Nrnadzor (meaning "pomegranate canyon" in Armenian, also the name of a nearby tributary of the Aras) was previously called Nyuvadi (Armenian: Նյուվադի; Azerbaijani: Nüvədi).

== History ==
During the Russian Empire, the village was a part of the Zangezur uezd of the Elizavetpol Governorate. The village was transferred from the Azerbaijan SSR to the Armenian SSR in 1928. The Azerbaijani-speaking population of the village fled in the summer of 1991 in the context of the Nagorno-Karabakh conflict, after which the village was repopulated by Armenians who fled from different parts of Azerbaijan. The exact date the Azerbaijani population departed was 8 August 1991 – the local administration ensuring their peaceful departure without violence. On 4 July 2006, the village was renamed to its current name.

== Demographics ==
The population is engaged with viticulture, fruit growing, animal husbandry and beekeeping. At its height, the local school consisted of about 1,000 students.

Sevan Nişanyan describes that the population of the village was "Turkish" until 1988, "Muslim Tat" until 1991, and adds that the local population was not of Tat origin, mentioning that the population is described as "Tatar" (later known as Azerbaijani) in Russian records since 1831. Whilst Tatul Hakobyan says that the Muslims who lived in Nrnadzor were actually Tats who over time, like thousands of Tats in Soviet Azerbaijan, became Azeri. The Tats were counted and enumerated in various ways between 1831 and 1931: as Muslims, Tatars, Turko-Tatars, and a Turkish group. Russian records of 1894 describe the village's population of consisting of 1,094 Tats.

After the exodus of the local Azerbaijanis, Armenian families from Gyumri, Kapan, Goris, Armavir, and Getashen (Çaykənd, Goygol) settled in the village. As of 2020, the administrative head of the village, Aleksan Boyajyan, claims that the village consists of "42 households, 128 inhabitants", also mentioning that "Because of the past 15 years, many of the settlers left the village."

The population of the village since 1831 is as follows:

Year	Population	Note
1831	291	100% Muslims
1873	705	100% Tatars
1886	1,083	100% Tats
1897	952	100% Muslims
1904	771	
1914	1,072	
1922	662	100% Turkish-Tatars
1926	494	480 Turks, 14 others
1931	596	100% Turkish
1939	618	
1959	761	
1970	1,277	
1979	1,539	
1989	1,344	
2001	152	
2004	106	
2010	140	
2011	148	
