= Yohannes Gugarats =

Armenian military leader

Yohannes Gugarats (Armenian: Յոհաննես Գուգարաց) was an Armenian military leader in early 18th century. He was one of the companions of Davit Bek moving to Syunik from the northern Armenian region of Gugark circa 1722. According to Ghukas Sebastatsi's History of Kapan, Gugarats commanded a 6,500 strong detachment of Gugark Armenians in the (ultimately unsuccessful) siege of the Vorotnaberd castle, considered impregnable. He later rescued David Bek's treasury and liberated the Armenian hostages taken by the Turks in Shnher town. He settled in the town of Meghri.
