= Meghri =

City in Syunik, Armenia

Meghri Մեղրի
- Town
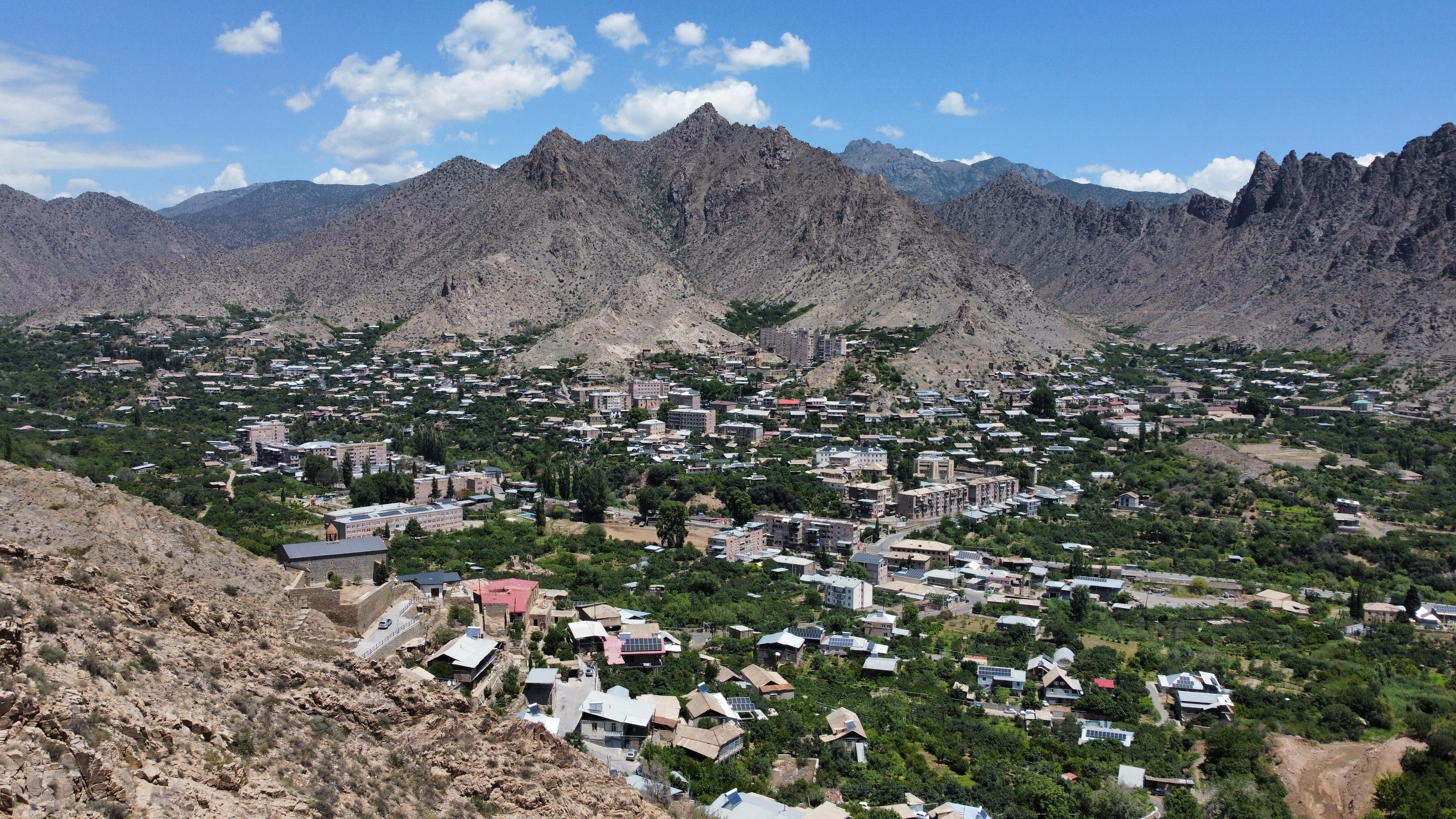
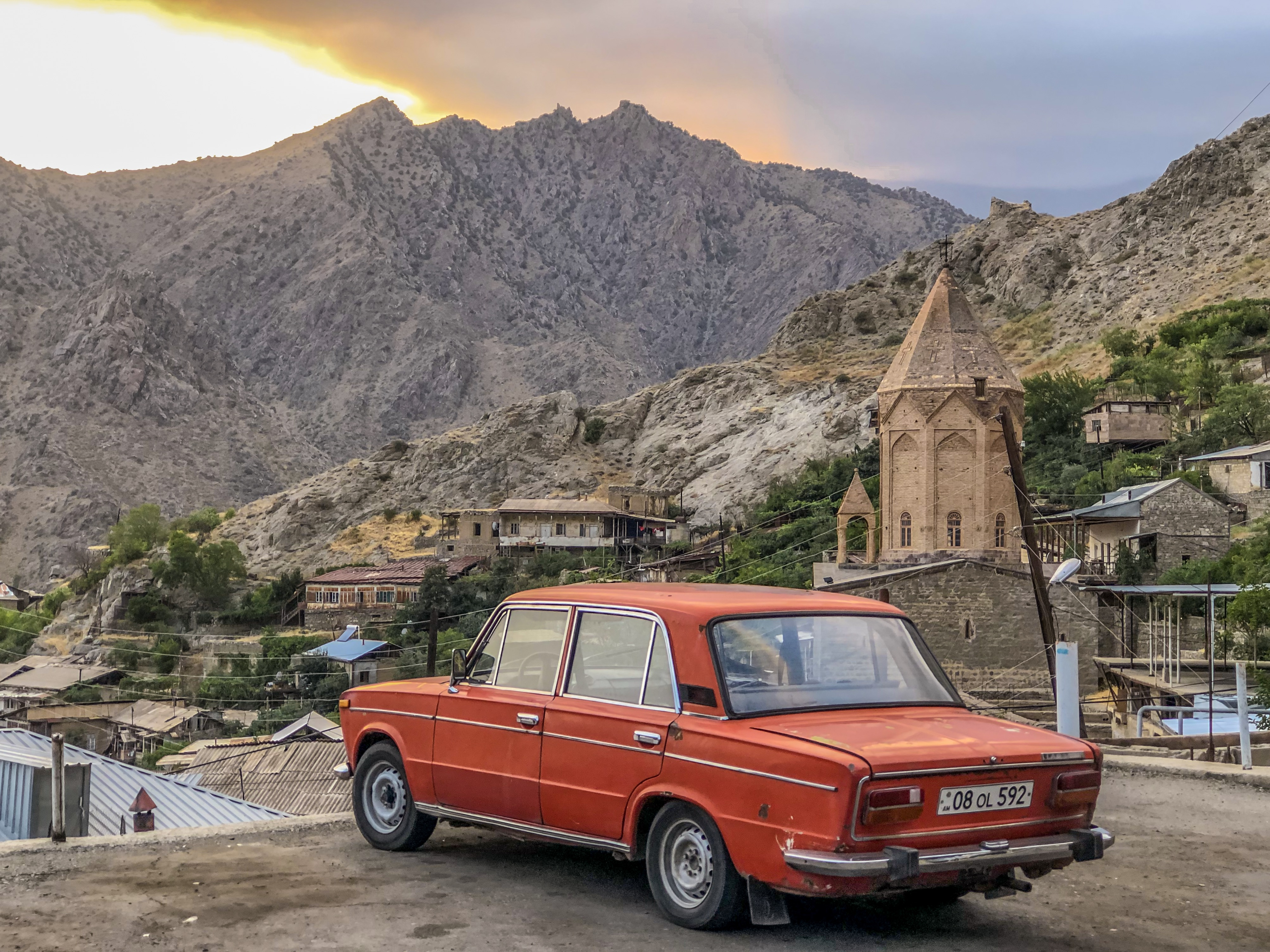
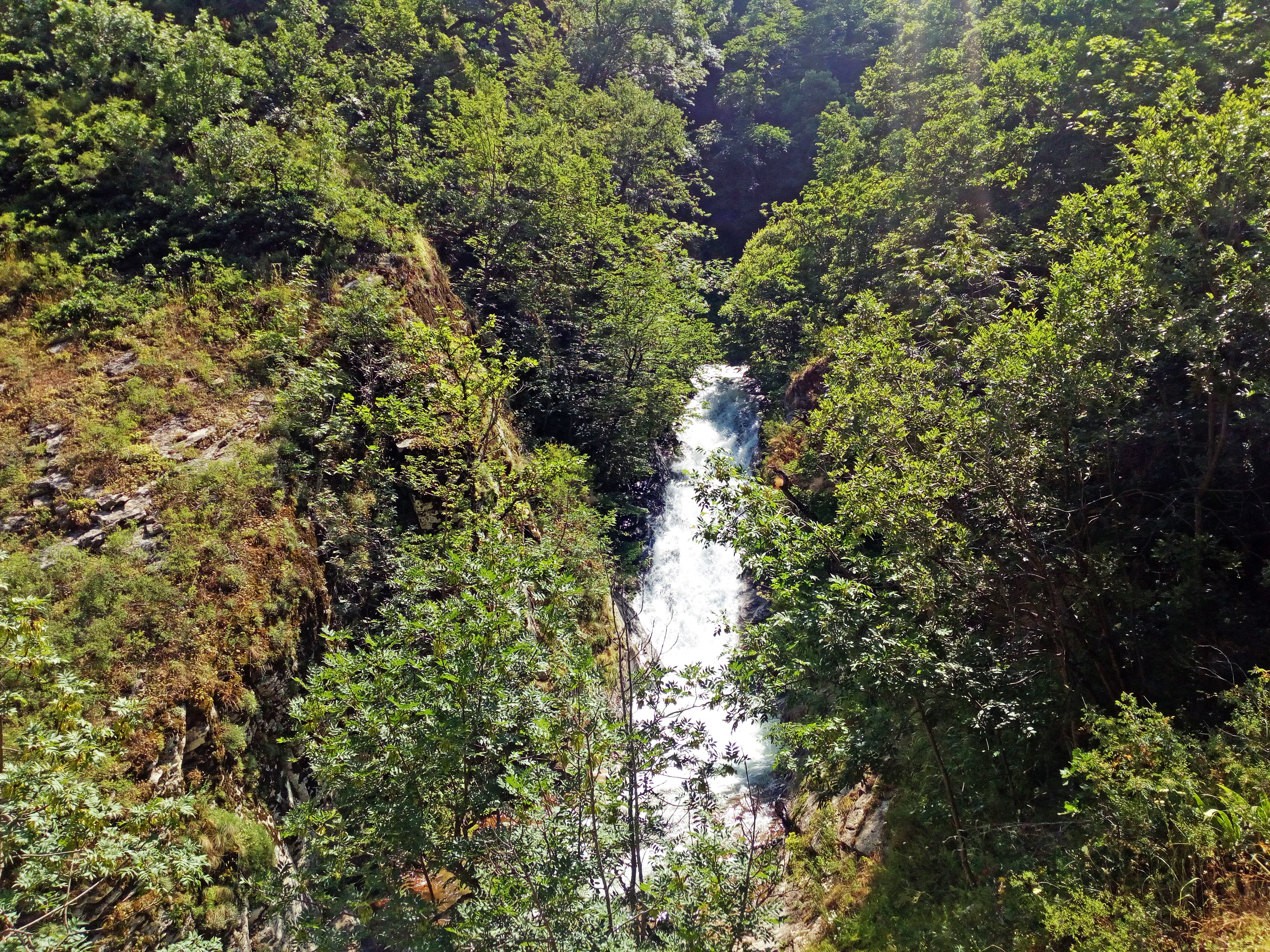
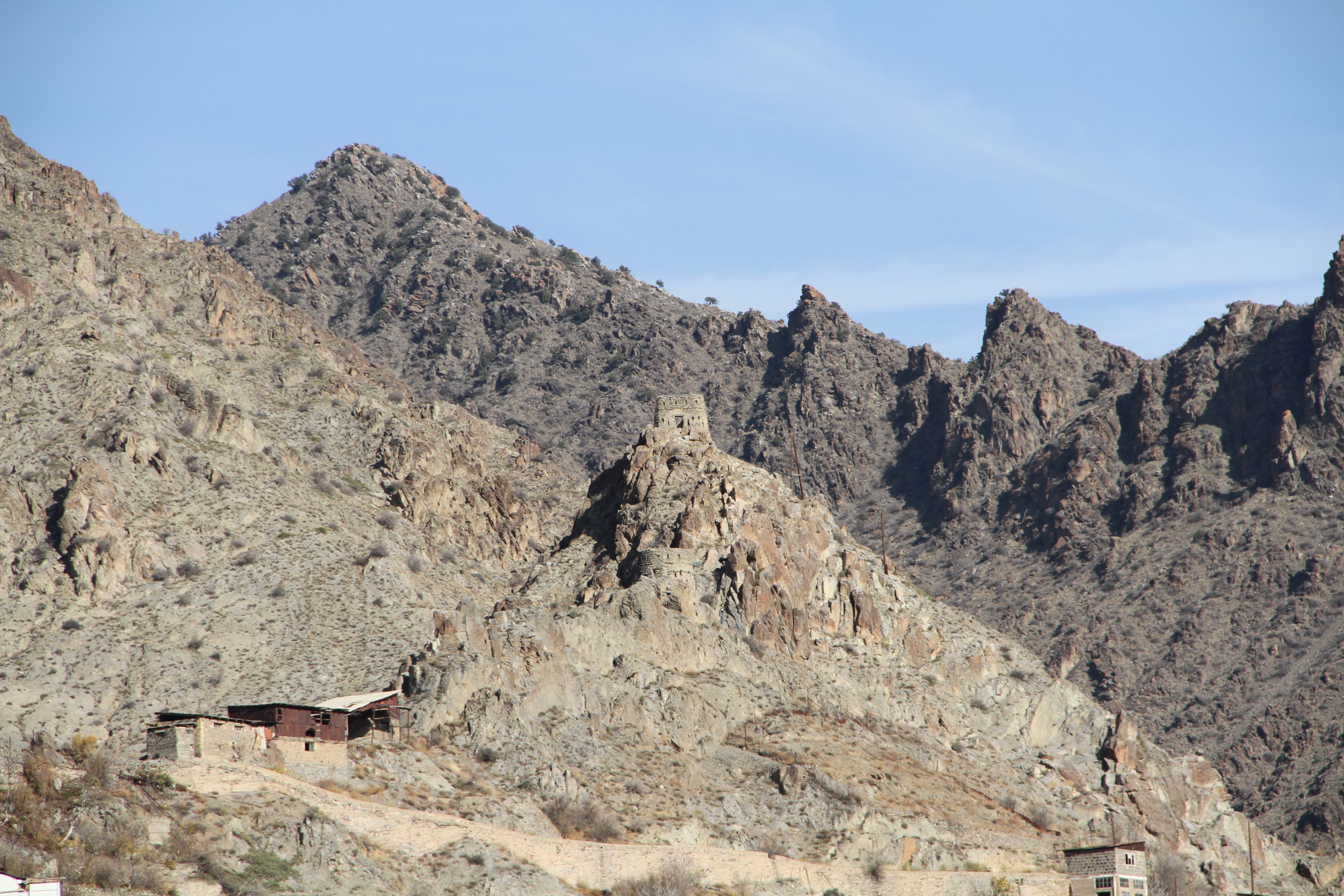
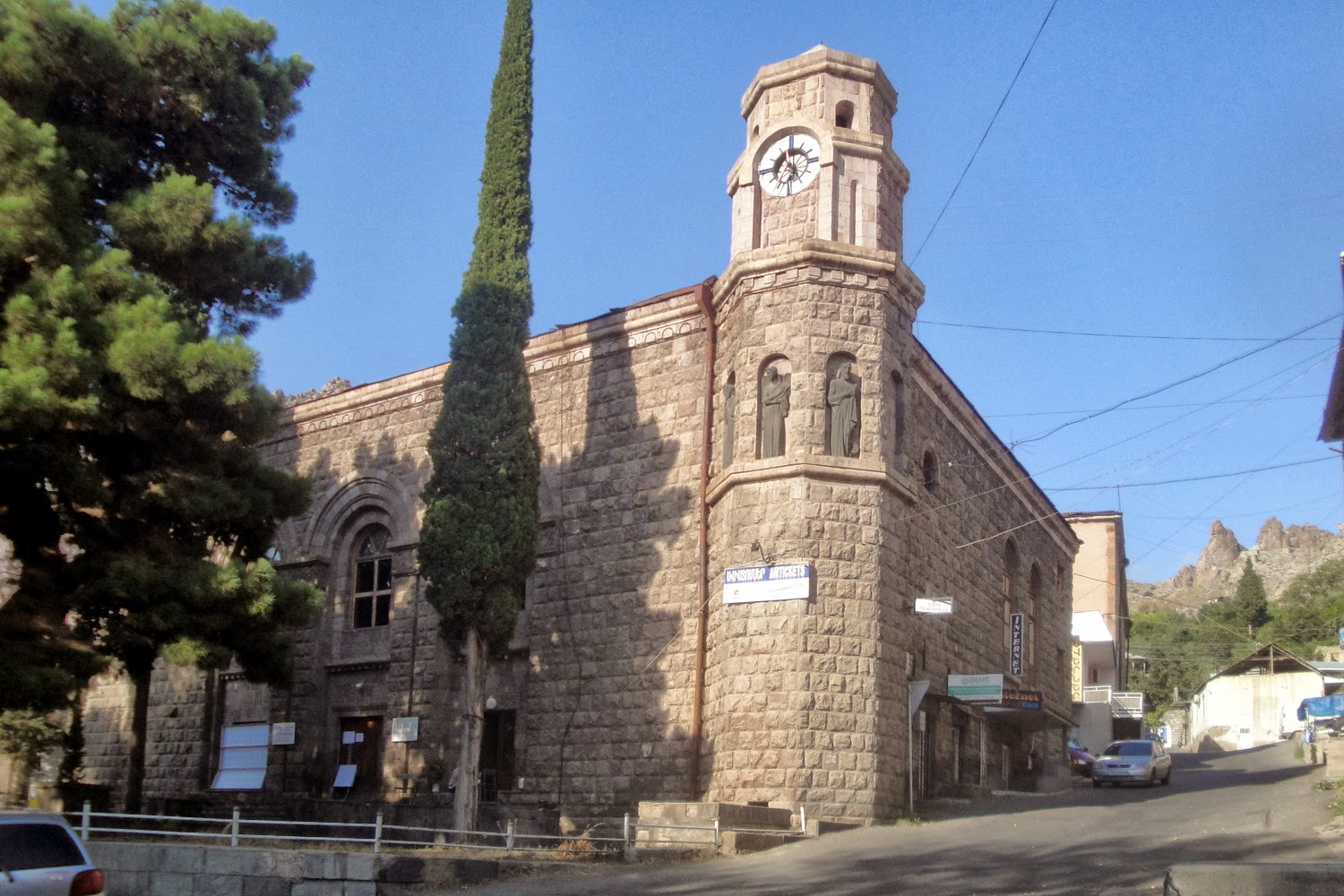
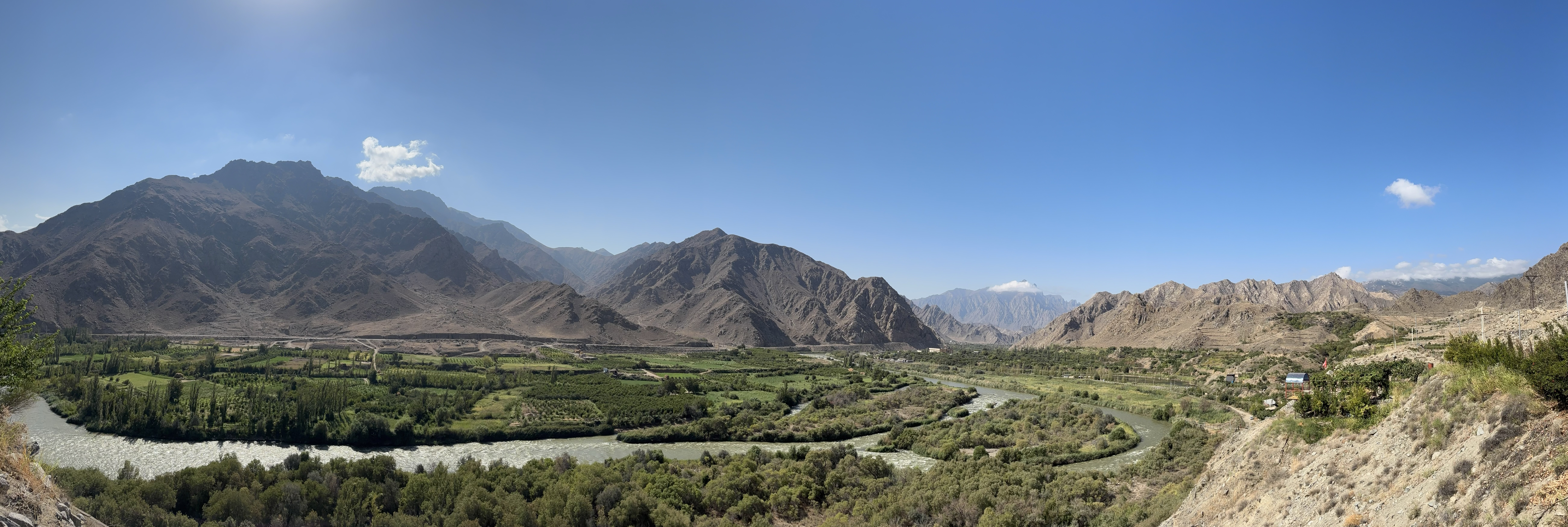
- General view of Meghri and Zangezur Mountains • Holy Mother of God Church and Old Town (Mets Tagh) • Meghri waterfall • Meghri Fortress • City center • Aras river valley in Meghri

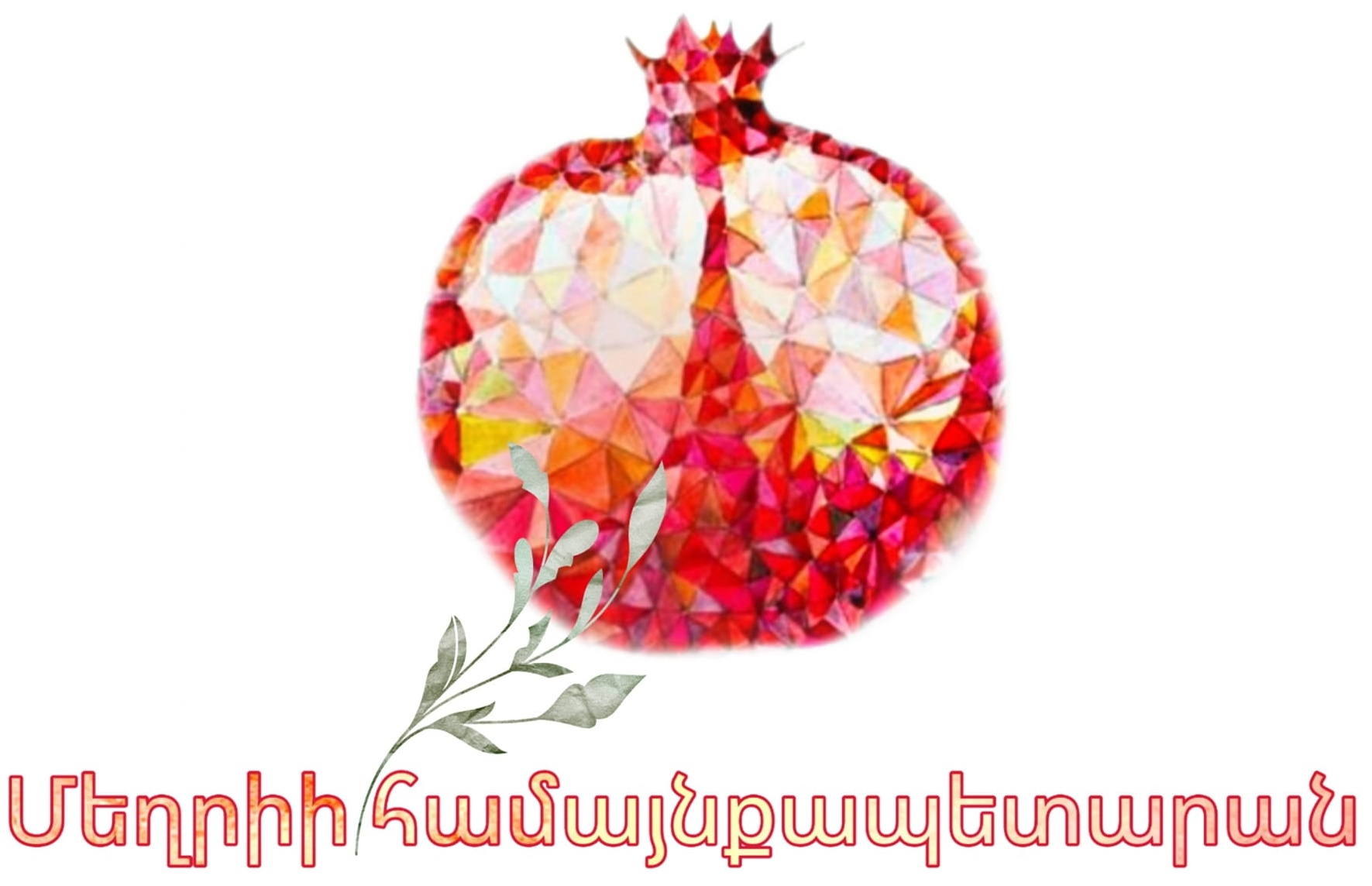
- Coat of arms

- Location within Armenia Location within Syunik Province
- Coordinates: 38°54′12″N 46°14′45″E
- Country: Armenia
- Province: Syunik
- Municipality: Meghri
- Founded as Karchavan by Smbat I Bagratuni: 906

Area
  - Total: 3 km^{2} (1.2 sq mi)
- Elevation: 610 m (2,000 ft)

Population (2022)
  - Total: 4,159
  - Density: 1,400/km^{2} (3,600/sq mi)
- Time zone: UTC+4 (AMT)
- Website: Official website

Meghri (Armenian: Մեղրի [mɛʁˈɾi]; Persian: مغری) is a town and the centre of the Meghri Municipality of the Syunik Province in southern Armenia, near the border with Iran. As of the 2011 census, the population of the town was 4,580. According to the 2020 official estimate, Meghri's population is around 4,500. As of the 2022 census, the population of the town was 4,159. Meghri is located 376 km south of the capital Yerevan and 73 km south of the provincial capital Kapan.

As a result of the community mergers in 2016, the municipality of Meghri was enlarged to include the surrounding villages of Agarak, Alvank, Aygedzor, Gudemnis, Karchevan, Kuris, Lehvaz, Lichk, Nrnadzor, Shvanidzor, Tashtun, Tkhkut, Vahravar, and Vardanidzor.

== Etymology ==
Meghri was founded as "Karchavan" in 906 by king Smbat I of Armenia, during the period of the Bagratid Kingdom of Armenia. Later, it was known as Meghri, meaning "honey town" in the Armenian language.

== History ==
=== Ancient history and Middle Ages ===
The area of present-day Meghri has been settled since the Bronze Age. Many archaeological sites are found in the vicinity of the town dating back to the 7th and 6th centuries BC, during the period of the kingdom of Urartu. Historically, it has been part of the Arevik canton of the ancient Syunik province of the Kingdom of Armenia.

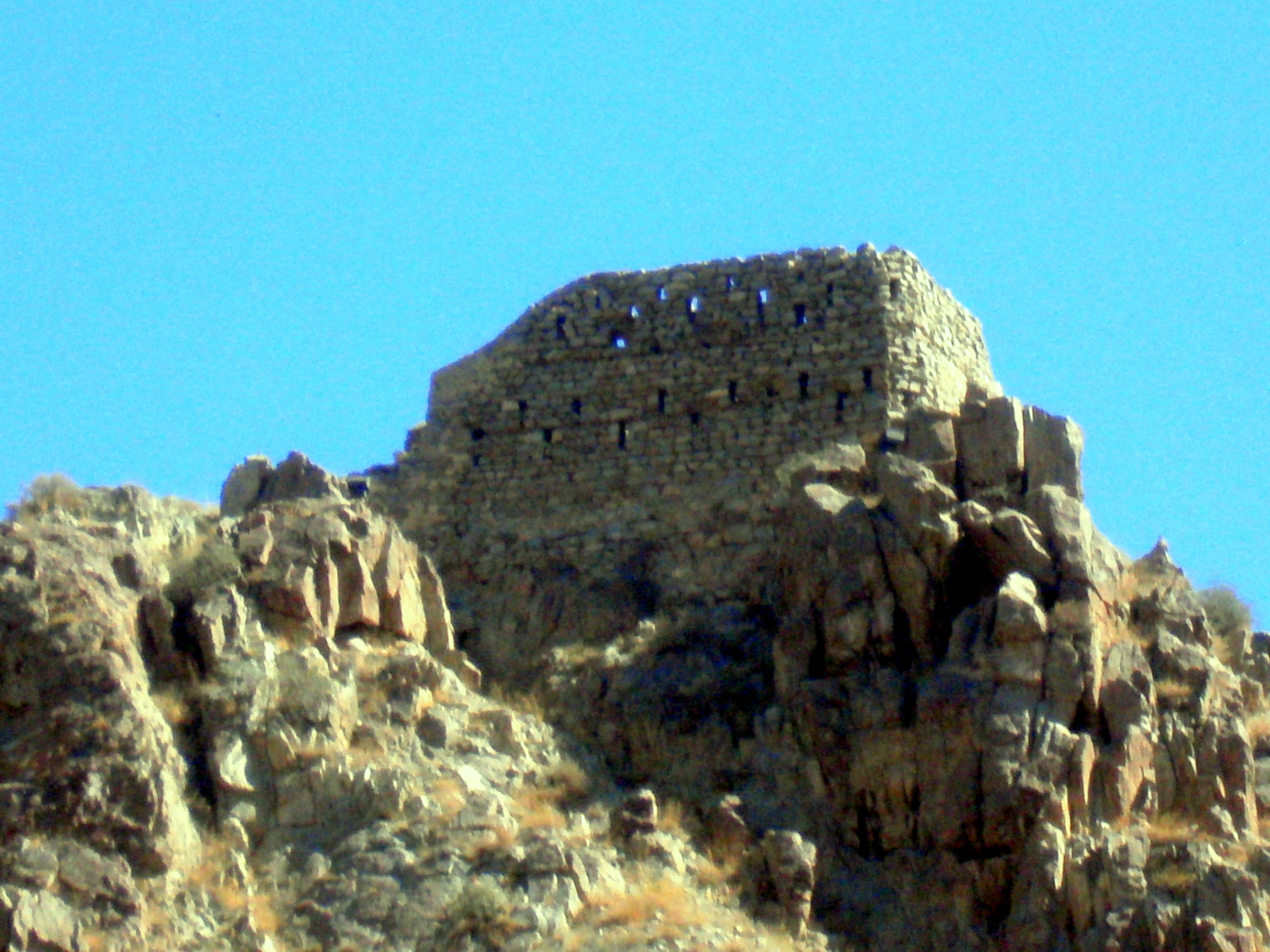
The remains of Meghri Fortress of the 11th century

With the establishment of the Tatev Monastery in the 8th century, the region of modern-day Meghri witnessed a rapid social and economic development. In 906, the settlement of Karchavan was founded by king Smbat I Bagratuni of the Bagratuni dynasty. In 987, the town (known as Meghri) was included within the newly-founded Armenian Kingdom of Syunik. In 1105, the region of Meghri was occupied by the Seljuks. The town was completely destroyed in 1126 and 1157 by the invading Seljuk forces.

Between the 12th and 15th centuries, Syunik, along with the rest of the historic territories of Armenia, had their melikdoms and had to fight Seljuk, Mongol, Aq Qoyunlu and Qara Qoyunlu invasions, respectively.

=== Iranian and Russian rule ===
At the beginning of the 16th century, Meghri became part of the Erivan Province within Safavid Iran. At the beginning of the 18th century, the region was involved in the liberation campaign of the Armenians of Syunik led by David Bek against Safavid Iran and the invading Ottoman Turks. Bek began his campaign in 1722 with the help of thousands of local Armenian patriots who liberated Syunik. He united the Armenian nobility in the region to form the Principality of Kapan, which included Meghri. Bek rebuilt the Meghri Fortress in the 18th century, making it the only Armenian fortress specifically built for firearms. In 1727, 400 of Bek’s soldiers held off a large Ottoman advance in the fortress. Local Armenian rule of the region lasted until 1747, when the region was brought back under Persian control as part of the Nakhichevan Khanate and then the Karabakh Khanate in 1750.

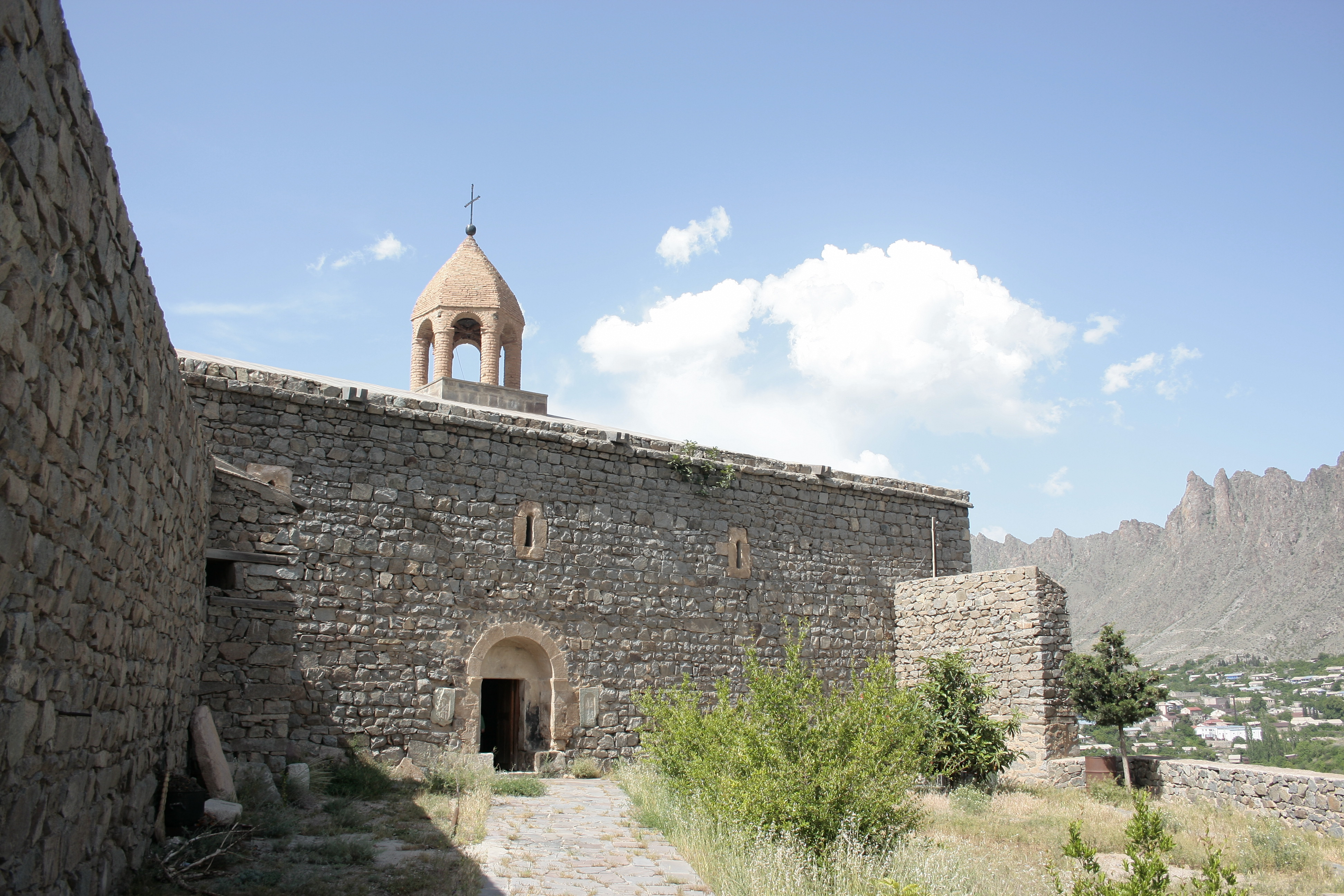
Surp Hovhannes Church of the 17th century

During the Russo-Persian war of 1804-1813, Meghri became a notable center for military operations in the region. In early 1810, Iranian crown prince Abbas Mirza sent thirty thousand troops to Nakhichevan in order to invade the Karabakh Khanate and go on to seize Georgia. Having crossed the Aras river on May 15, the Persians occupied Meghri. In response, the commander of the Karabakh detachment of Russian troops, Major General Pyotr Nebolsin, sent a detachment battalion of about 500 people under the command of Colonel Pyotr Kotlyarevsky with the task of reconquering Meghri, which, due to its strategic position, was known as the “key to Karabakh and Tabriz.” The Persian garrison in Meghri consisted of 1,500 regular Persian infantry (Sarbaz) with artillery stationed on the right, steep bank of the Meghri River. The Persians heavily fortified the villages, which was defended by two hundred sarbaz. Divided into three columns, the Russian detachment secretly approached Meghri along the valley of the Aras River and on the morning of June 17 suddenly attacked the central fortification of the Persians, broke into the village and, after a stubborn battle, captured it. The Persians lost more than 300 people, the losses of the Russian detachment amounted to 35 people. Subsequent attempts by the Persian troops to return to Meghri were unsuccessful.

In 1810, young British army officer William Monteith visited the region as part of his service with the British embassy to Persia. His 1856 memoirs paint a vivid picture of the Meghri valley which he describes as a "romantic glen" that he rates as "one of the most beautiful in Persia, or indeed in any country." He notes that "in former times [it] has evidently been densely peopled for churches, abandoned but still perfect, are thickly scattered on the slopes of the mountains, which here rise to a height on the western side of 8000 to 10,000 feet, covered with forests. The trees are of no great size, and much interspersed with apple, pear, and walnut, probably the remains of former gardens, or produced by seeds carried by the birds and wind into the once cultivated land."

He describes the settlement of Meghri itself as being divided into two sections, each about half a mile from the river Araz, and separated by "small enclosed gardens, surrounded by vines". At the time, Russians controlled the larger village on the north side; the Persians occupied Little Meghri. The Araz he describes as being here a rapid foaming torrent, fordable only in one place, about a mile and a half farther up the river.

In October 1813, during the peace negotiations between Iran and Russia that would lead to the Treaty of Golestan, the Iranian representative Mirza Abolhassan Khan Ilchi convinced the Russian representative Nikolay Rtishchev to return Meghri to Iran as an act of goodwill. In 1828, Meghri became part of the Russian Empire as a result of the Russo-Persian War of 1826–28 and the signing of the Treaty of Turkmenchay. It was included within the Karabakh province until 1868 when it became part of the newly-formed Zangezur uezd of the Elizavetpol Governorate.

In 1881, the first mixed school was opened in Meghri. In 1901, a consumers' co-operative was opened in Meghri, which was the first of its type in Armenia.

=== Modern history ===
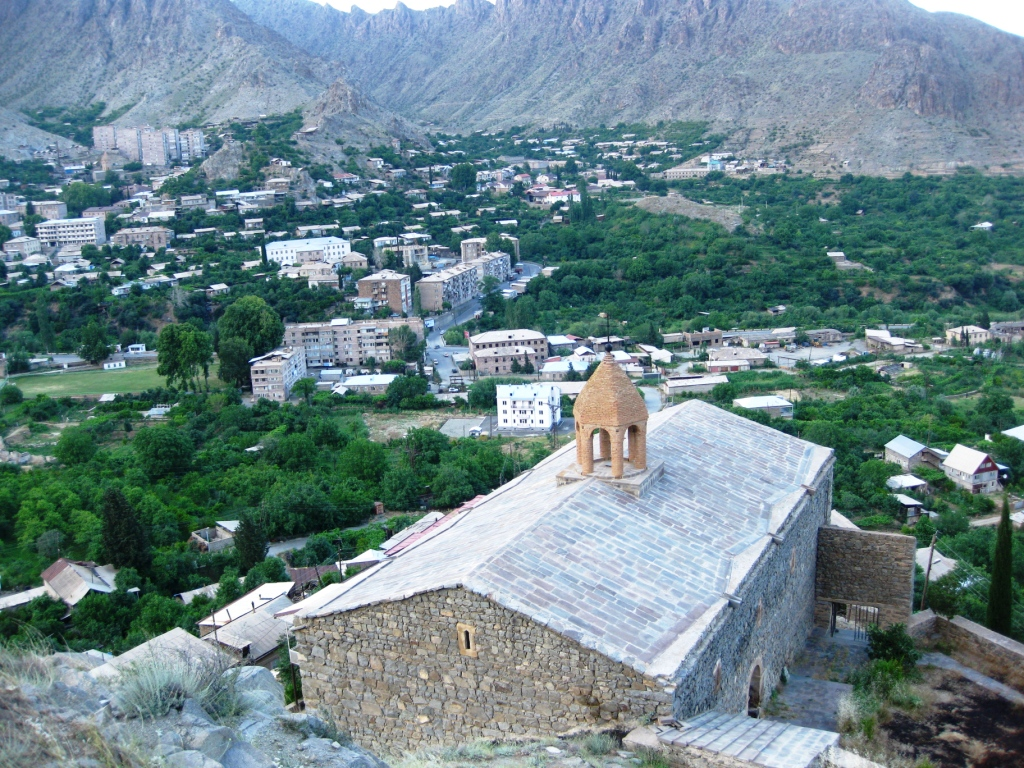
Surp Hovhannes Church overlooking Meghri

With the establishment of the Republic of Armenia in 1918, Meghri was included within the Zangezur region of the newly-founded republic. However, after the fall of the republic in December 1920, the 2nd Pan-Zangezurian congress held in Tatev on 26 April 1921, announced the independence of the self-governing regions of Daralakyaz (Vayots Dzor), Zangezur -including Meghri-, and parts of Mountainous Artsakh, under the name of the Republic of Mountainous Armenia (Lernahaystani Hanrapetutyun). However, the self-proclaimed republic had a short life, when the Red Army conducted massive military operations in the region during June–July 1921, attacking Syunik from the north and east. As a result of fierce battles, the Republic of Mountainous Armenia capitulated on 13 July 1921, following Soviet Russia's promises to keep the mountainous region of Syunik as part of Soviet Armenia.

The Soviets established the Meghri raion in September 1930, and the settlement of Meghri became the centre of the newly-formed raion. In 1959, Meghri was given the status of an urban-type settlement. In 1984, Meghri was granted with the status of a town. It was developed as a centre of food industry based on the local agricultural products of the region.

After the independence of Armenia, Meghri was included within the newly-formed Syunik Province, as per the administrative reforms of 1995.

== Geography ==
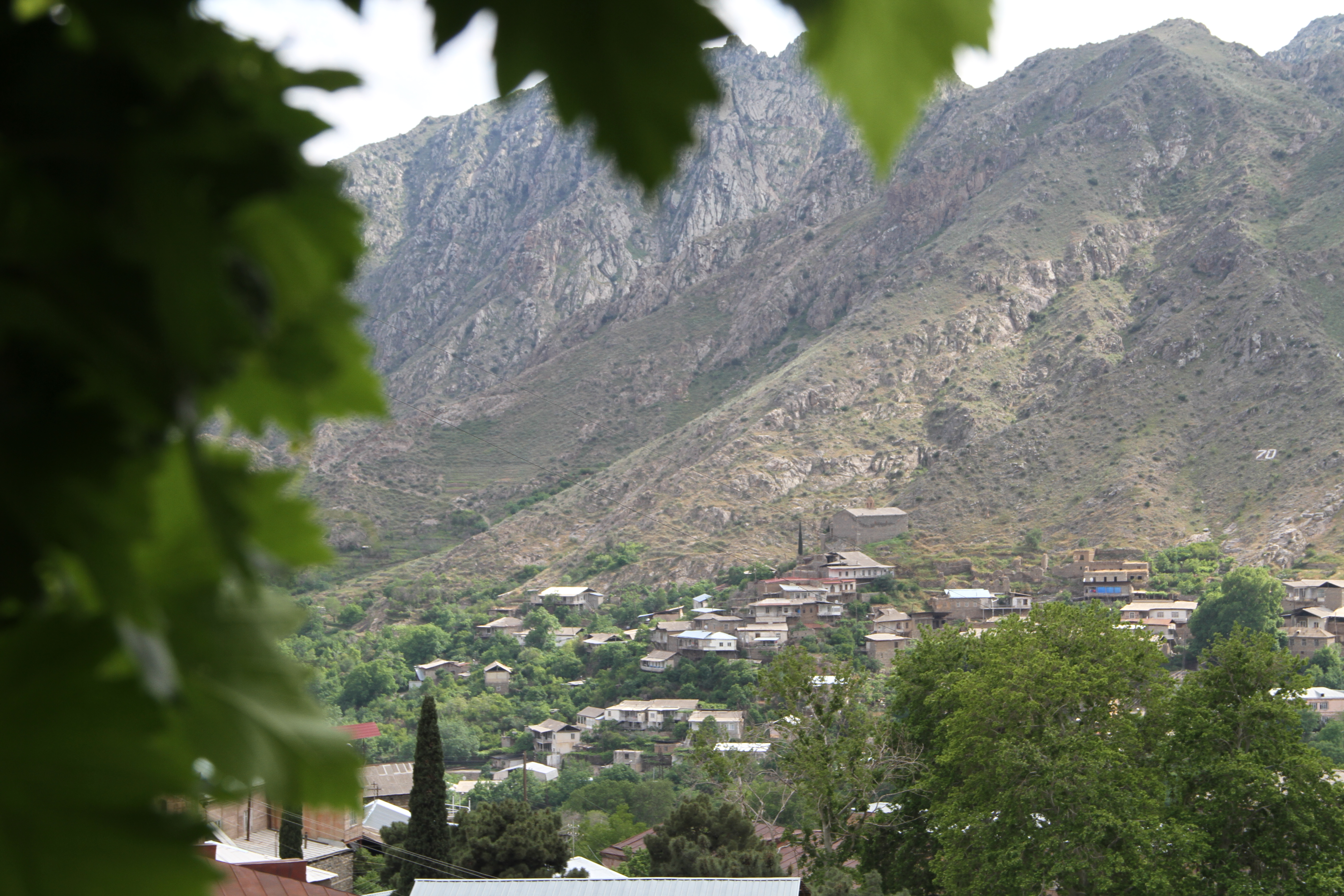
Meghri at the slopes of Meghri mountain range

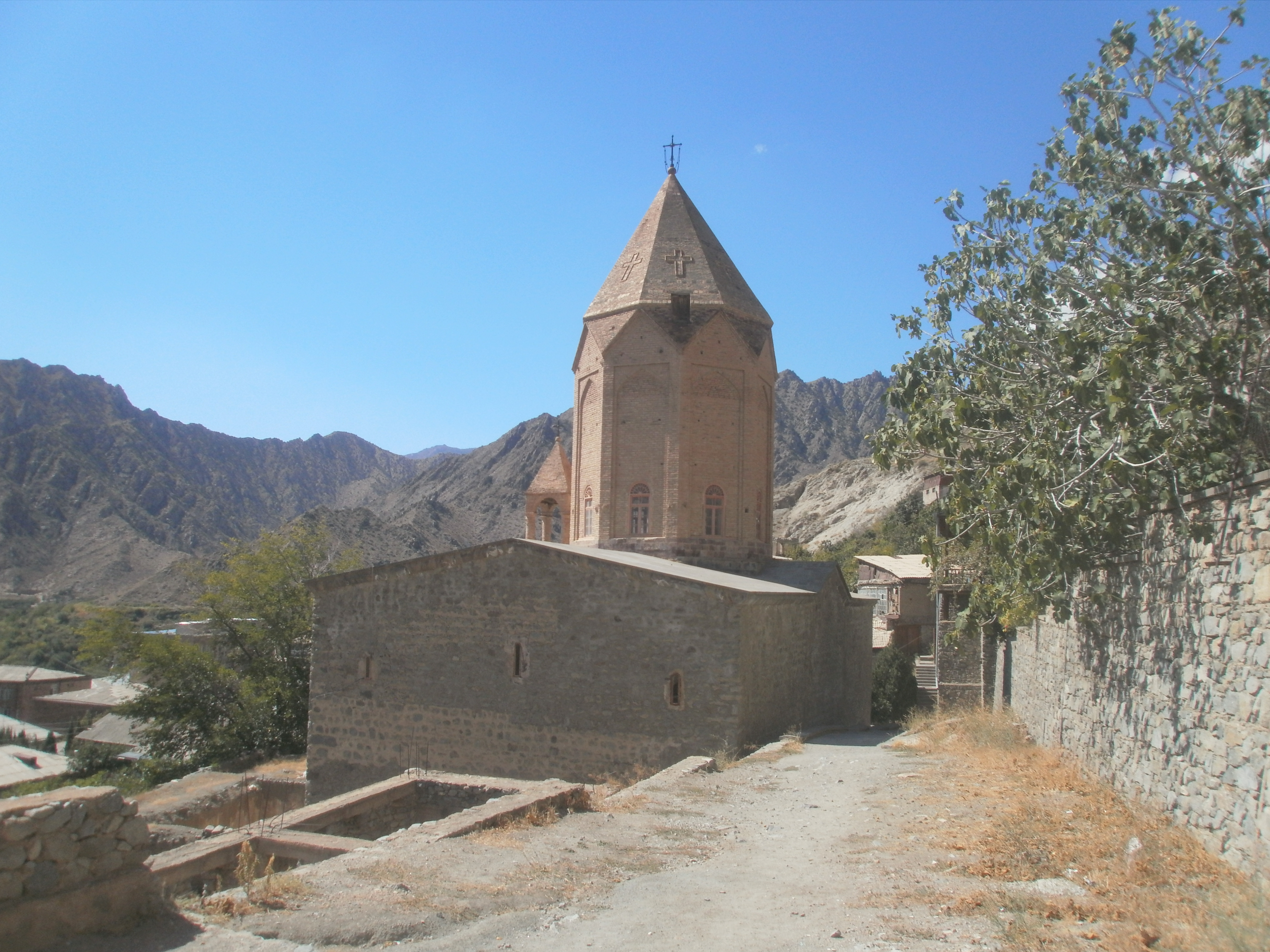
Holy Mother of God Church in Meghri, consecrated in 1673

At an average height of 610 meters above sea level, Meghri is located near the Armenia-Iran border, on the shores of Meghri River, dominated by Zangezur Mountains from the northeast, and Meghri range from the southwest.

The town is mainly divided into 2 large neighborhoods:

- Mets tagh meaning the large neighborhood, located on the left bank of Meghri river, it occupies the eastern part of Meghri. Formed during the 17th century, it occupies around 70% of the town's area.
- Poqr tagh meaning the small neighborhood, located on the right bank of Meghri river, it occupies the western part of Meghri. It was formed during the Soviet days in the 20th century.

The 2 neighborhoods are separated by the Meghri river and Adelyan Street.

The surrounding areas of the town are designated as a Prime Butterfly Area, having number of rare and endangered species of butterflies, such as Gegenes nostradamus, Papilio alexanor, Cupido argiades, Polyommatus damonides, and others.

=== Climate ===
Meghri has a continental influenced semi-arid climate (Köppen climate classification: BSk or "cold semi-arid climate"), with cool, dry winters and long, hot, dry summers. Spring is the wettest season, while summer is the driest. During winter, precipitation often falls as snow. On 1 August 2011, Meghri recorded a temperature of 43.7 °C (110.7 °F), which is the joint highest temperature to have ever been recorded in Armenia (along with the capital Yerevan).

Climate data for Meghri (1991-2020, extremes 1981-2020)
Month	Jan	Feb	Mar	Apr	May	Jun	Jul	Aug	Sep	Oct	Nov	Dec	Year
Record high °C (°F)	20.0 (68.0)	22.7 (72.9)	31.6 (88.9)	35.6 (96.1)	38.6 (101.5)	40.4 (104.7)	43.7 (110.7)	42.2 (108.0)	39.9 (103.8)	34.8 (94.6)	27.0 (80.6)	26.3 (79.3)	43.7 (110.7)
Daily mean °C (°F)	2.4 (36.3)	4.8 (40.6)	9.8 (49.6)	14.5 (58.1)	19.5 (67.1)	24.4 (75.9)	27.2 (81.0)	27.0 (80.6)	22.3 (72.1)	16.3 (61.3)	9.5 (49.1)	4.6 (40.3)	15.2 (59.3)
Record low °C (°F)	−12.1 (10.2)	−11.8 (10.8)	−10.9 (12.4)	−3.0 (26.6)	1.6 (34.9)	7.8 (46.0)	13.0 (55.4)	12.4 (54.3)	6.7 (44.1)	0.1 (32.2)	−4.8 (23.4)	−12.6 (9.3)	−12.6 (9.3)
Average precipitation mm (inches)	14.7 (0.58)	20.3 (0.80)	31.5 (1.24)	43.4 (1.71)	47.0 (1.85)	24.6 (0.97)	12.9 (0.51)	7.2 (0.28)	14.1 (0.56)	20.4 (0.80)	24.0 (0.94)	16.2 (0.64)	276.3 (10.88)
Average precipitation days (≥ 1 mm)	3.2	4.3	6.1	7.2	8	3.9	1.8	0.9	2.2	3.9	4.3	3.4	49.2
Average relative humidity (%)	66.2	62.6	60.3	63	62.5	53.9	50.4	49.5	59.5	66.1	67.6	67	60.7
Mean monthly sunshine hours	98.5	119.5	165	185.1	245.3	295.1	317.5	304.5	243.2	180.3	123.1	91.1	2,368.2

Climate data for Meghri
Month	Jan	Feb	Mar	Apr	May	Jun	Jul	Aug	Sep	Oct	Nov	Dec	Year
Mean daily maximum °C (°F)	1.5 (34.7)	3.2 (37.8)	8.1 (46.6)	13.8 (56.8)	19.9 (67.8)	24.6 (76.3)	27.0 (80.6)	26.3 (79.3)	22.4 (72.3)	16.4 (61.5)	8.7 (47.7)	4.2 (39.6)	14.7 (58.4)
Daily mean °C (°F)	−1.9 (28.6)	−0.6 (30.9)	4.0 (39.2)	8.8 (47.8)	14.2 (57.6)	18.2 (64.8)	20.9 (69.6)	20.4 (68.7)	17.0 (62.6)	11.5 (52.7)	4.8 (40.6)	0.6 (33.1)	9.8 (49.7)
Mean daily minimum °C (°F)	−5.3 (22.5)	−4.2 (24.4)	−0.1 (31.8)	3.8 (38.8)	8.4 (47.1)	11.8 (53.2)	14.7 (58.5)	14.5 (58.1)	11.5 (52.7)	6.6 (43.9)	0.8 (33.4)	−3.0 (26.6)	5.0 (40.9)
Average precipitation mm (inches)	22 (0.9)	28 (1.1)	41 (1.6)	44 (1.7)	44 (1.7)	30 (1.2)	12 (0.5)	10 (0.4)	17 (0.7)	21 (0.8)	25 (1.0)	25 (1.0)	319 (12.6)
Source: https://www.weather-atlas.com/en/armenia/meghri-climate

== Demographics ==
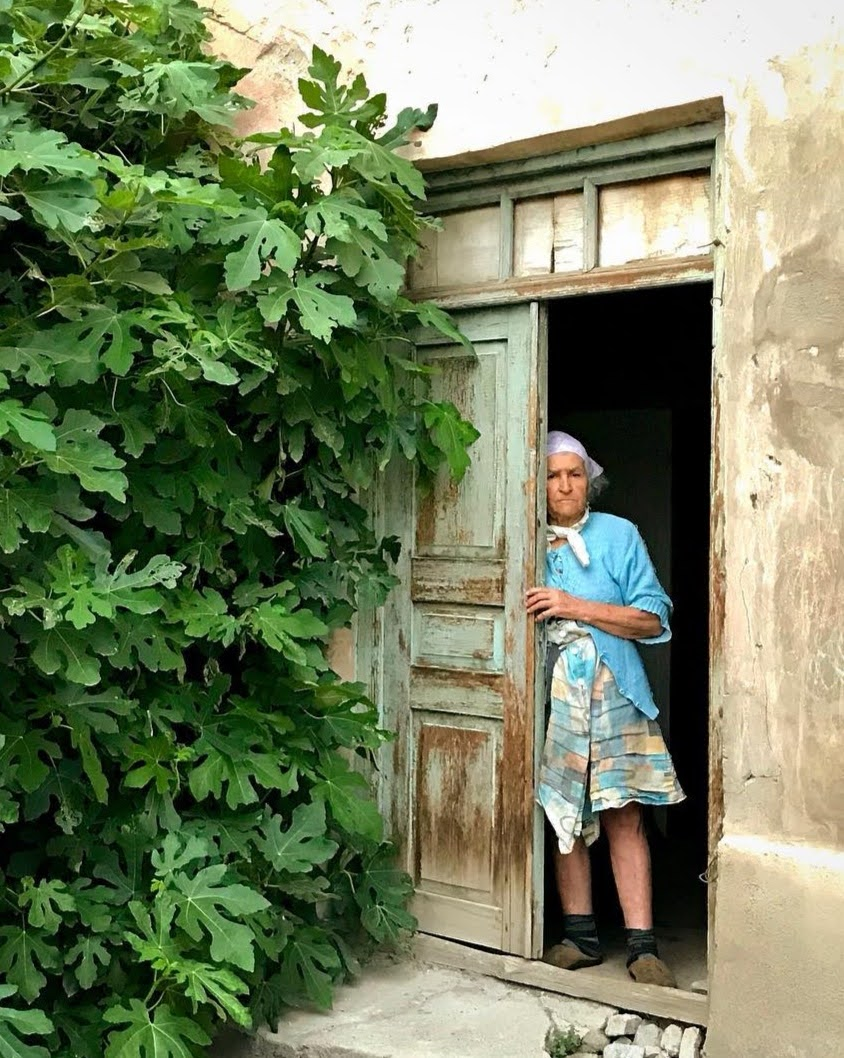
Armenian woman in Meghri

Meghri is almost entirely populated by Armenians who belong to the Armenian Apostolic Church. The Church of the Holy Mother of God of Meghri of the large neighborhood opened in 1673, is the main church of the town. It is under the jurisdiction of the Diocese of Syunik based in Goris.

The town of Meghri has experienced relative population growth since the 19th century and especially during the Soviet years when several factories were set up there. In 1831 it was only a village with 272 inhabitants, in 1897 it already had 927 people. It continued to grow in the following decades and peaked in 2011, when, according to that year's census, it had 4,580 inhabitants but due to the country's economic crisis the population declined to 3,500 in 2016.

Historical population
Year	Pop.	±% p.a.
1831	272	—
1897	927	+1.88%
1926	1,161	+0.78%
1959	3,095	+3.02%
1980	4,180	+1.44%
2001	4,805	+0.67%
2011	4,580	−0.48%
2022	4,159	−0.87%

== Culture ==
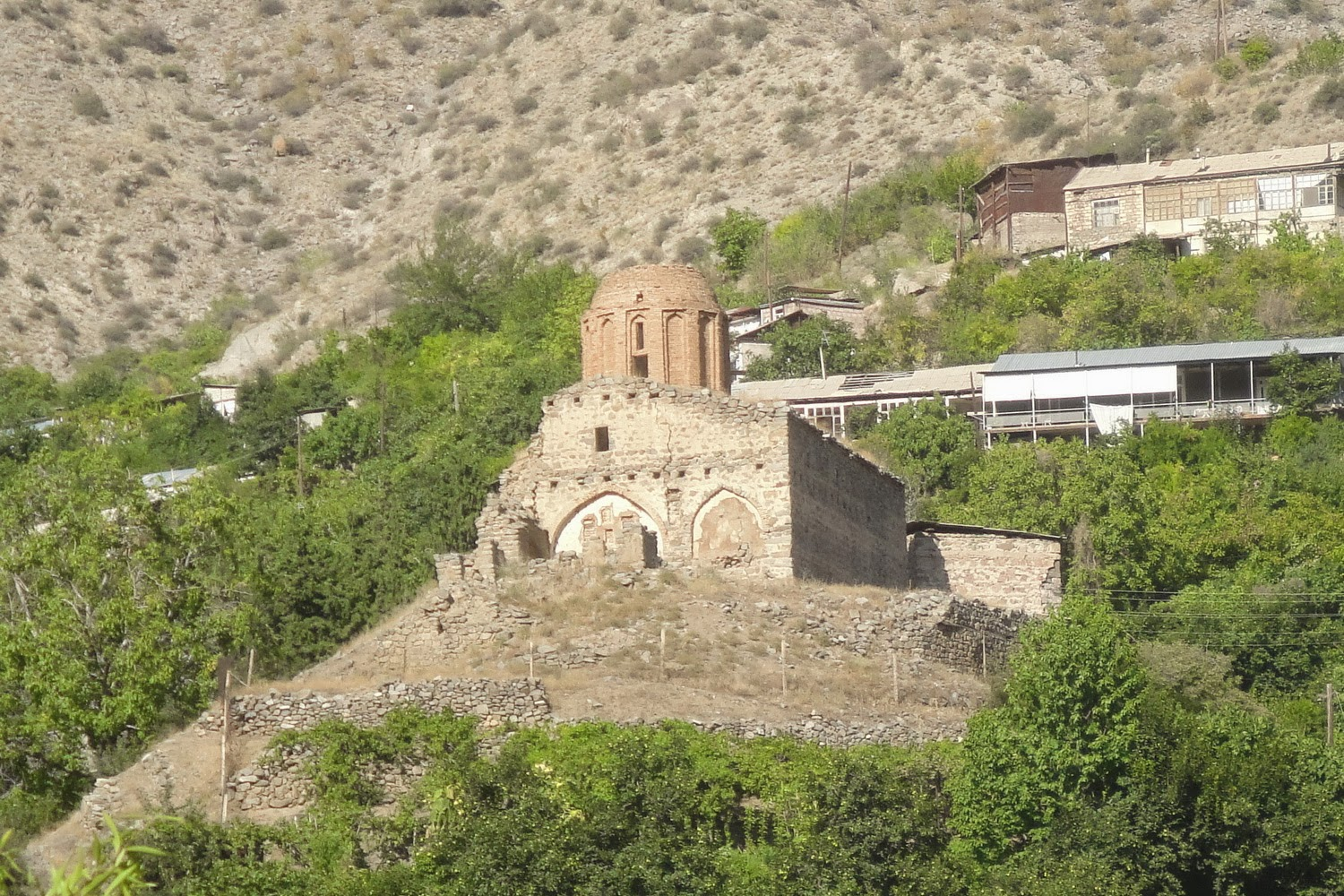
The remains of Surp Sarkis church

Meghri has a public library founded in 1882. The municipality also runs the cultural centre and the children's school of art. A branch of Yerevan fine arts teaching centre was opened in Meghri in 1985.

The remains of Meghri Fortress dating back to the 11th century are found at the eastern heights of the town. In addition to the Holy Mother of God Church of 1673, the 17th century Surp Hovhannes church located in the small neighborhood is also active and famous for its wall paintings. The abandoned church of Surp Sarkis located at the north of Meghri, is also dating back to the 17the century.

== Transportation ==
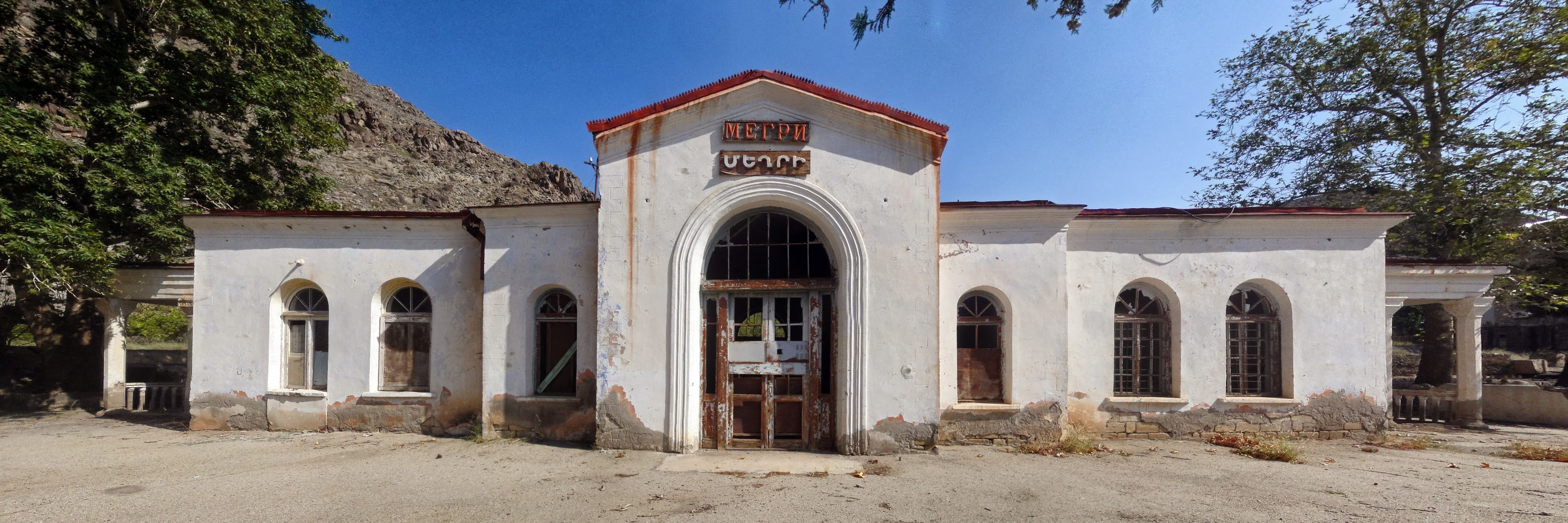
The abandoned railway station

Meghri is the main gate between Armenia and Iran through the nearby Agarak border crossing. The M-2 road that connects the capital Yerevan with Iran, passes through Meghri.

During the Soviet days, Meghri was connected with Yerevan by railway passing through the Nakhichevan Autonomous Soviet Socialist Republic. After the dissolution of Soviet Union and as a result of the military conflict between Armenia and Azerbaijan, the railroad became abandoned.

== Economy ==
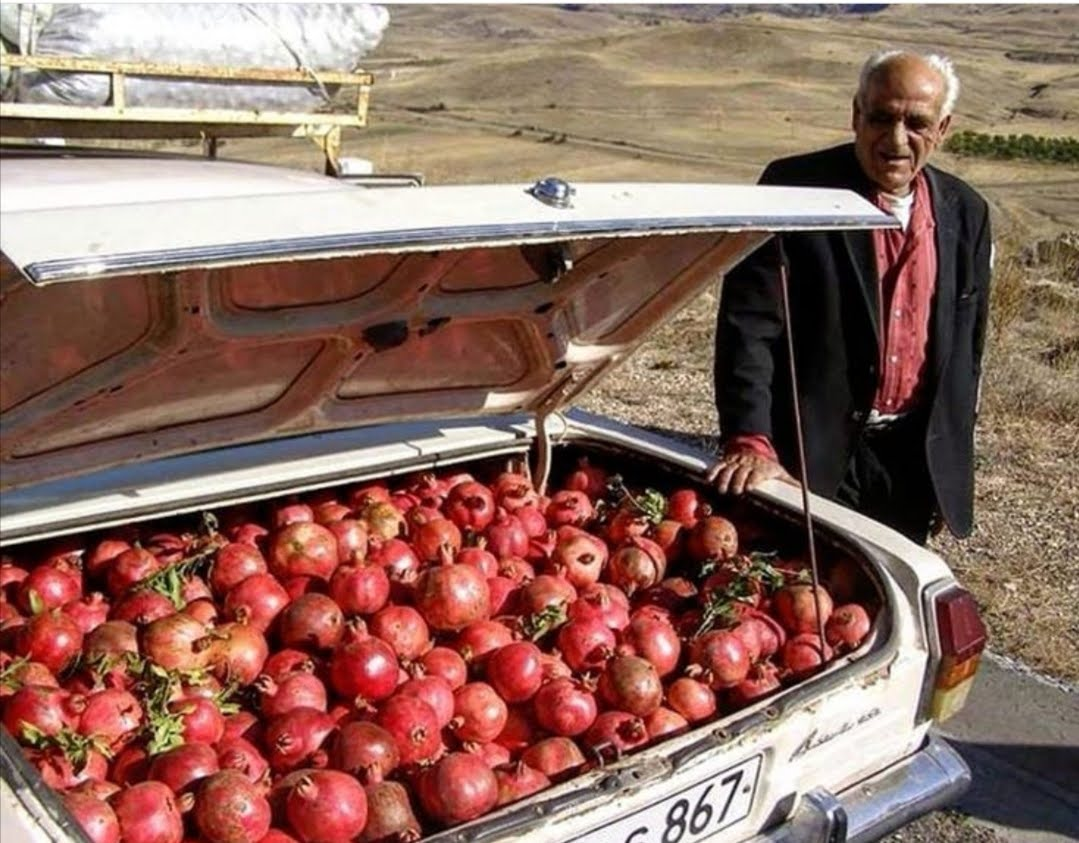
Local Meghri fruitseller

The town's economy is based on food industry, which contains a bread-baking factory, canneries and small home-based wineries. Meghri used to have a large wine factory during the Soviet years.

Agriculture is among the leading sectors in the region. Meghri is the only location in Armenia that produces pomegranate. The region is also known for its high-quality fig. Meghri has a significantly milder climate than the rest of the cities in Armenia, and produces fruits not found in other parts of the country.

The Iran-Armenia Natural Gas Pipeline passes through Meghri. In early 2007, it was reported that the governments of Armenia, Russia, and Iran are planning to build an oil refinery for gasoline export to Iran. This US$1.7 billion project would be led by Gazprom whose Armenian subsidiary is already the country's main energy supplier though in 2016 a new agreement opened up the possibility of having Meghri area's domestic gas supply (around 5000 households) to be provided by Iranian company Sanergy.

The Meghri Dam (also known as the Meghri Hydroelectric Project or Aras Watershed Dam) is a hydroelectric system planned on the Aras River near Meghri on the Armenia–Iran border. The construction was to have begun in 2012. The joint project was proposed and discussed earlier in the 1990s between Iranian and Armenian authorities.

In June 2016, the Meghri Medical Center was opened with the presence of then-president Serzh Sargsyan.

== Tourism ==
Although the region is unique for its climate and abundant honey and fruit production (pomegranate, one of the national symbols of Armenia is only cultivated in Meghri), landscapes with rocky mountain ranges, the Aras River, an equally unique cultural heritage that is partly influenced by the Persian culture, for example, the murals of the local church, recently renovated thanks to a US subsidy. The remoteness of the country’s capital and the complicated conditions of the mountain roads lengthen the drive and therefore few tourists choose it. Visitors to the area are mostly adventurers who visit Armenia with the aim of later reaching Iran and, as Meghri is located right on the border, is visited by such tourists.

According to the Meghri administration, there are a total of 11 small hotels and hostels offering 170 rooms with 171 beds, despite the annual average number of guests reaching only 6580 people.

According to the State Tourism Committee of Armenia, about 220,000 Iranians visited Armenia in 2017, which is 16% more than in 2016 (about 185,000). The trend implies that the Meghri region has significant potential of tourism development. However, it lacks the capacity to host even a third of Iranian tourists. This is why people prefer other cities or choose a direct trip to Yerevan by visiting the region.

In the city there is an inn called Arevik which has between 8 and 10 beds created to somehow welcome tourists but due to the distances between Yerevan and Meghri there is not much investment because entrepreneurs are afraid of not receiving income and lack infrastructure.

To revive the city a program was created that would arouse the interest of tourists to the region. It consists of four main components: development planning, reconstruction of the neighborhood, capacity building and advertising of Meghri as a new tourist destination. Developing planning means creating a professional base to provide hospitality services with local traditions.

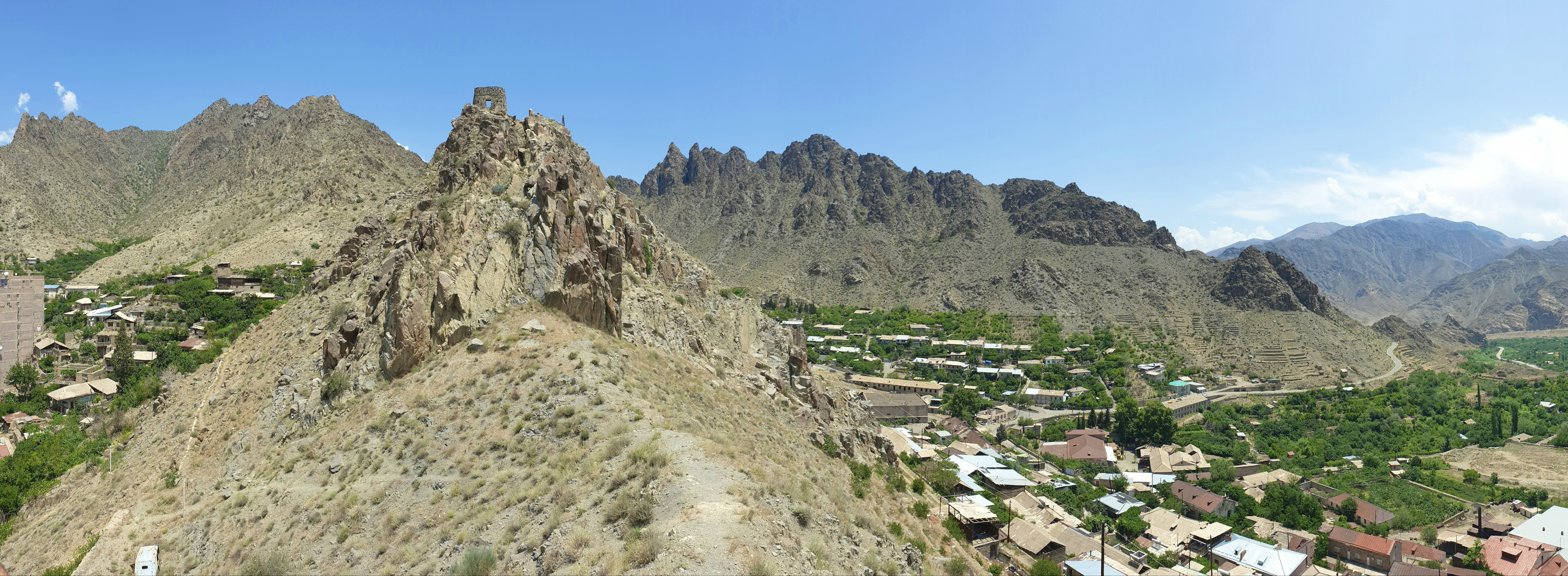
General view from Meghri Fortress

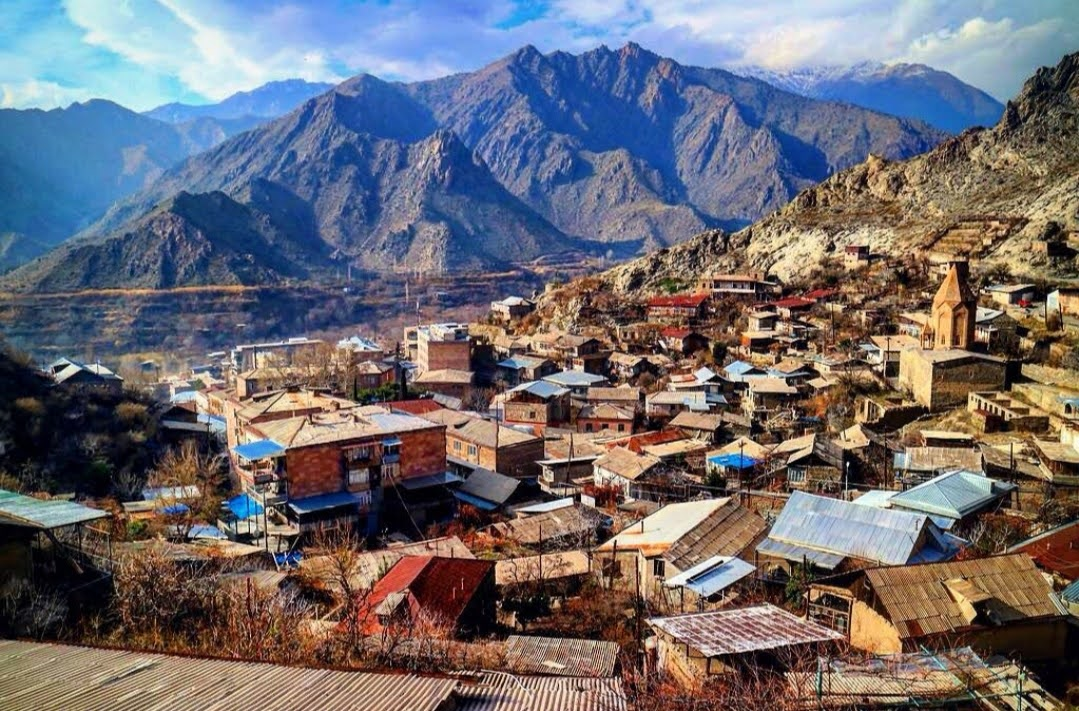
General view of Poqr Tag, the historic part of town

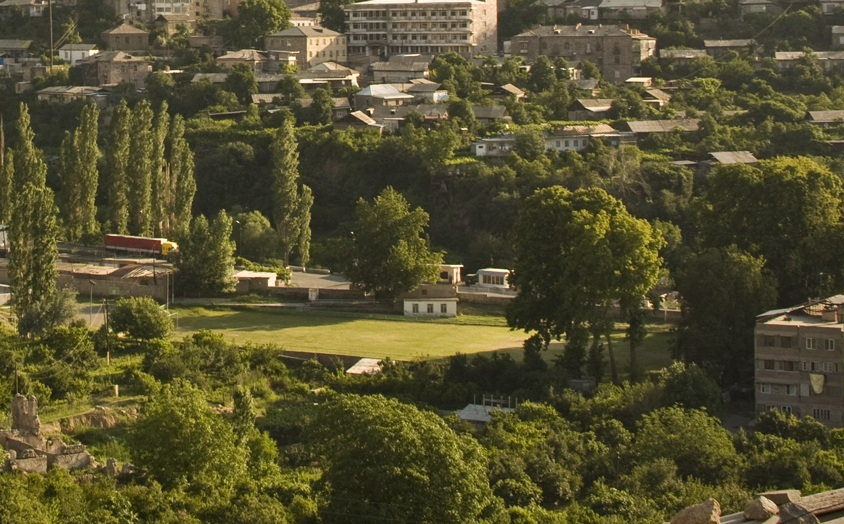
Football field in Meghri

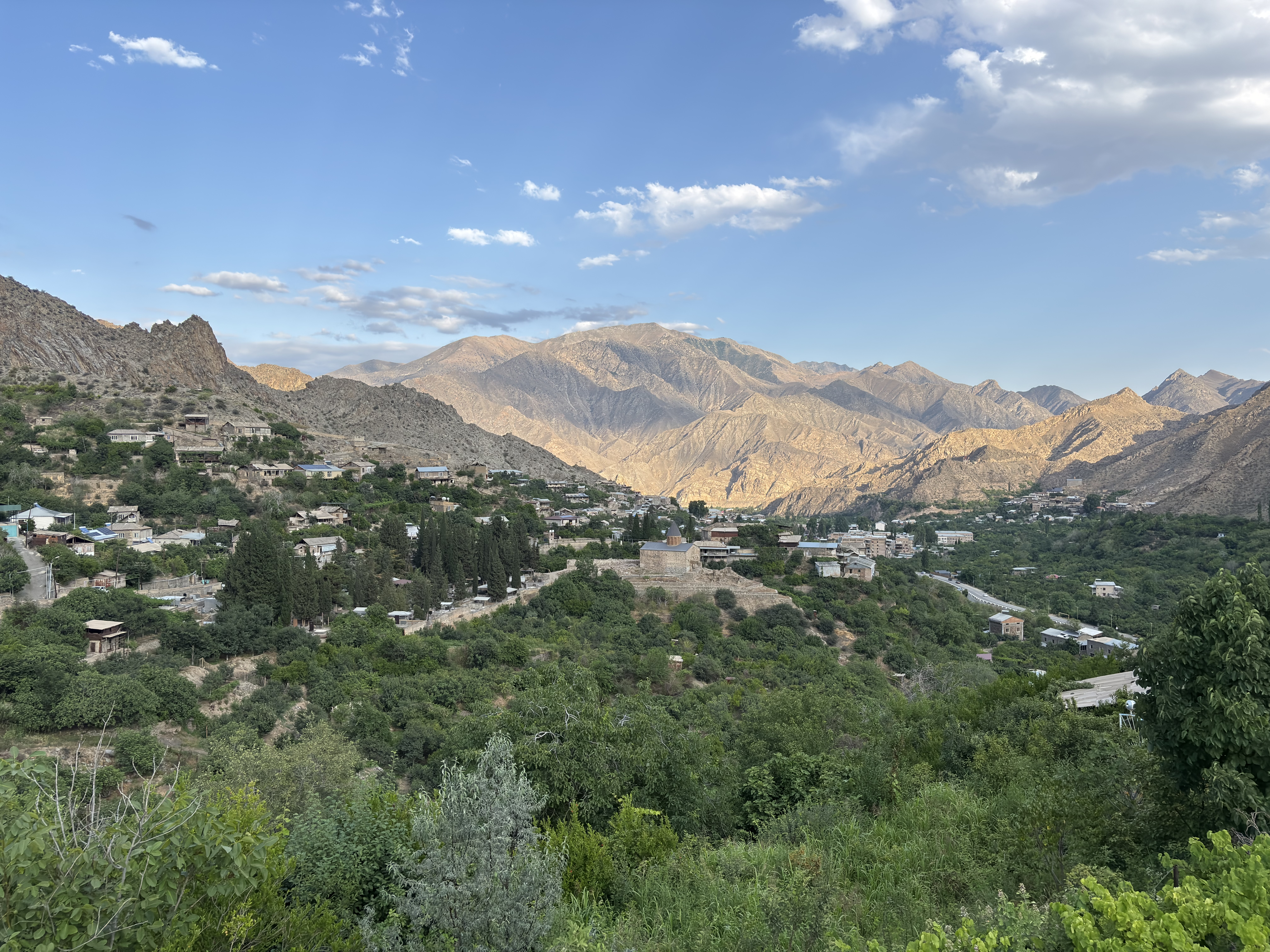
View of Meghri

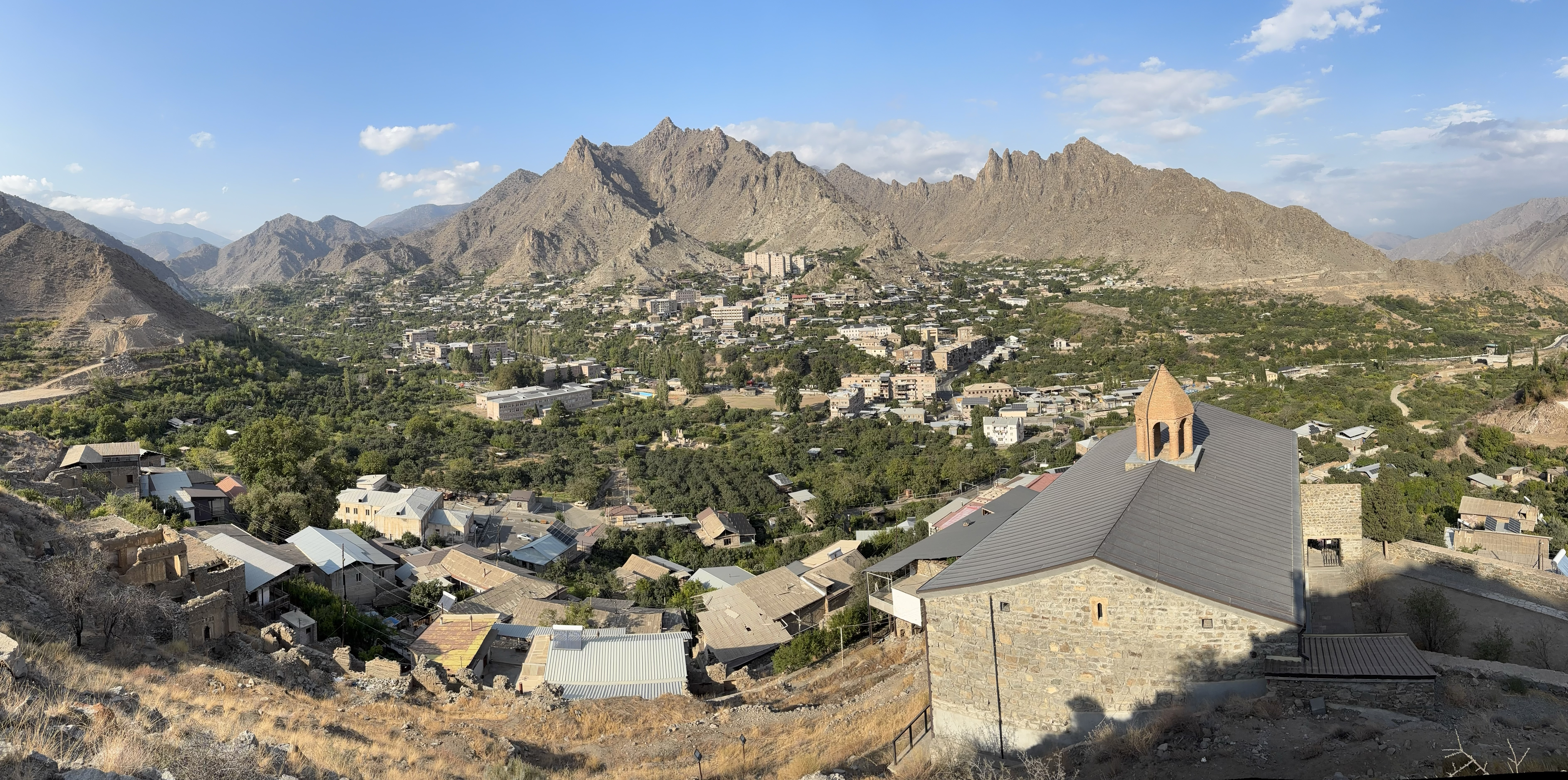
View of Meghri

== Education ==
As of 2017, Meghri is home to 2 public high schools. It also has a pre-school kindergarten ran by the municipality. In 2001, an intermediate technical college was opened in Meghri, preparing teachers, accountants and mechanists.

== Sport ==
Meghri has a sports school served by a football training field and 2 swimming pools located at the centre of the city in the small neighborhood, on the right bank of Meghri river.

== Notable people ==
- Yohannes Gugarats
- Khachatur Malumian, writer and political activist, victim of the Armenian genocide
- Paramaz (born Matteos Sarkissian), Armenian fedayee and political activist
- Tigran Martirosyan, tennis player

== Gallery ==
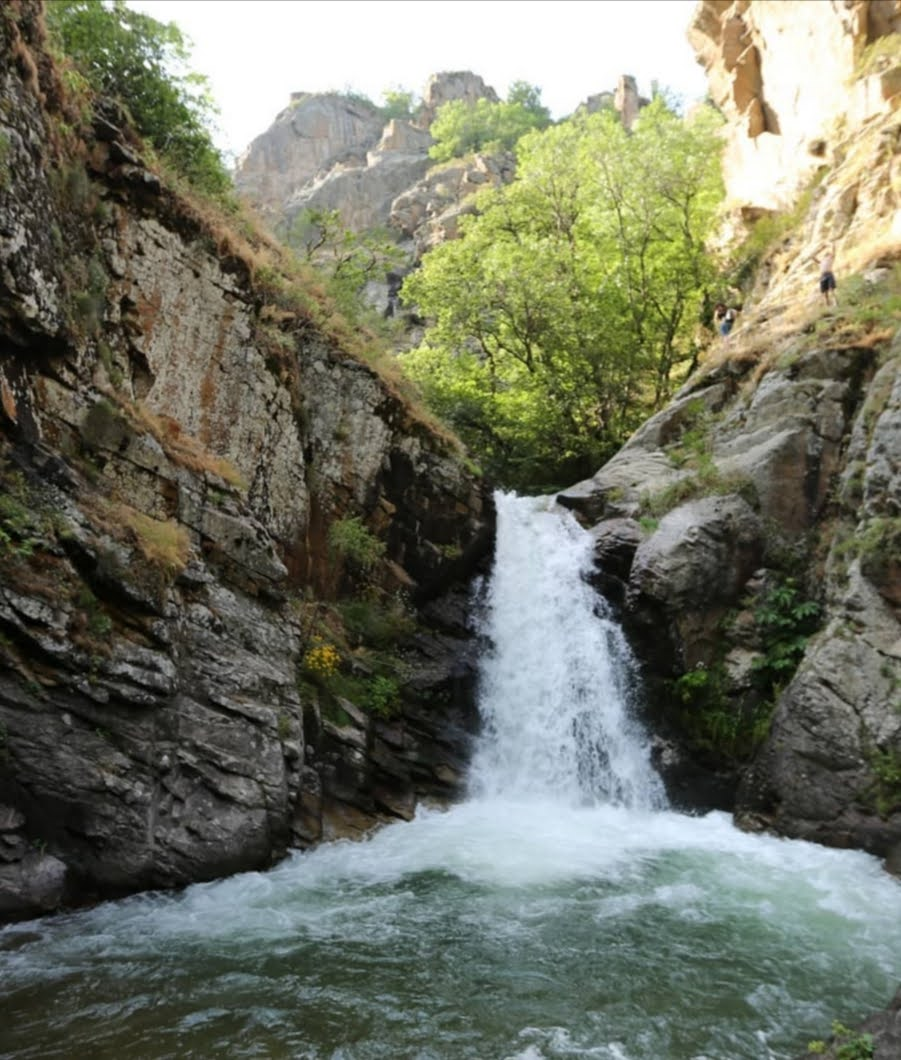
Waterfall of Meghri

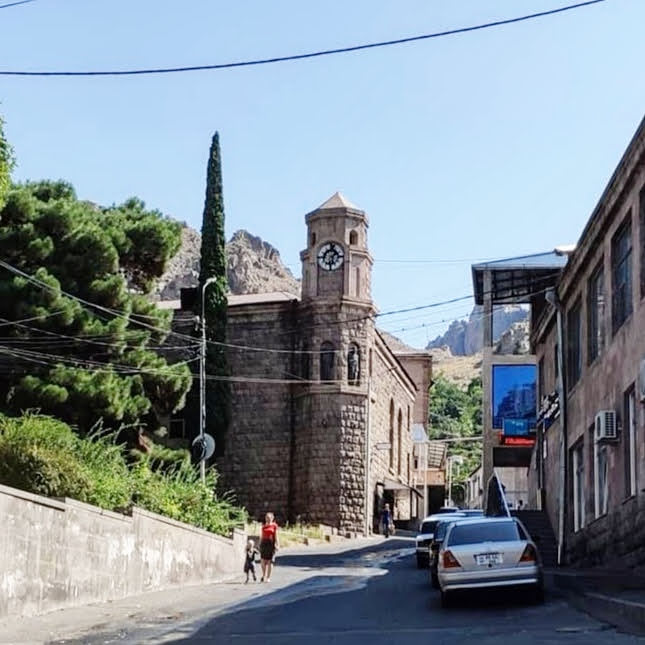
Meghri City Hall

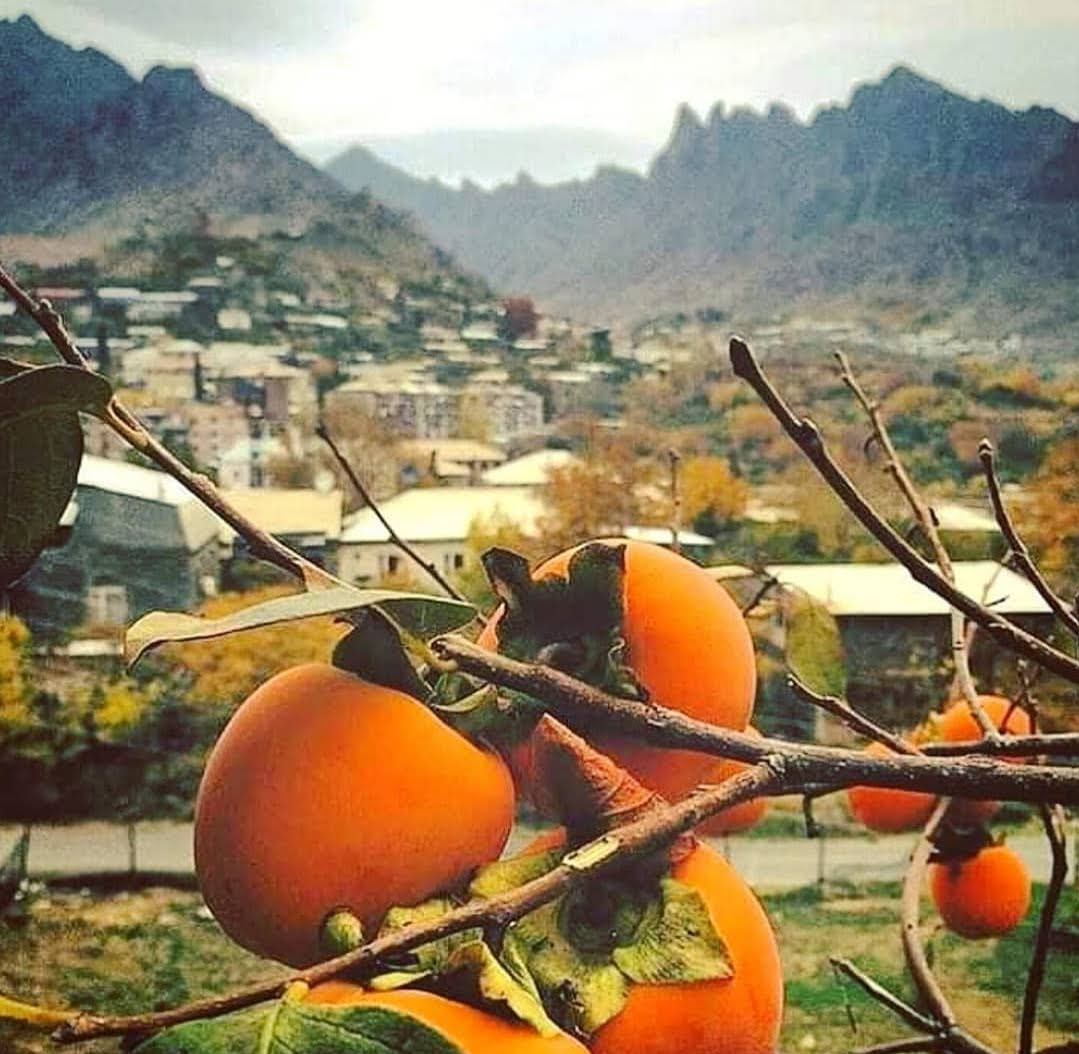
Local persimmons

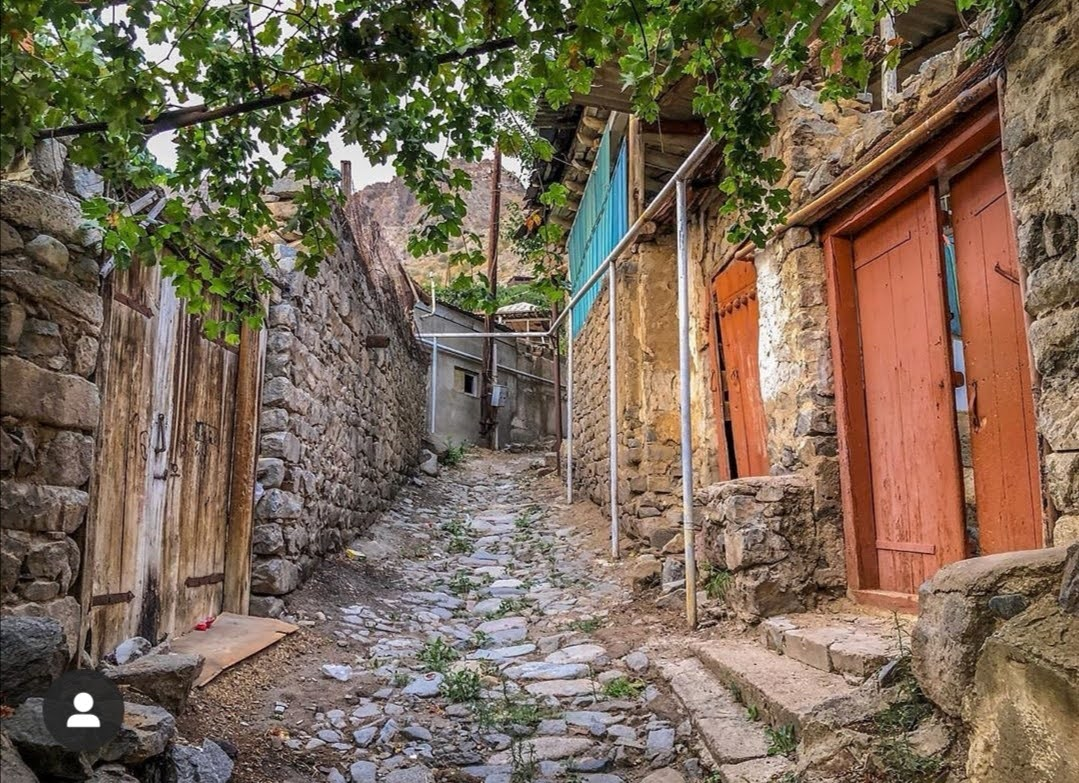
Meghri Old Town (Pokr Tag)

== See also ==
- Kingdom of Syunik
- Meghri Dam
- Poqr Tagh

== Sources ==
- Behrooz, Maziar (2023). Iran at War: Interactions with the Modern World and the Struggle with Imperial Russia. I.B. Tauris. ISBN 978-0-7556-3737-9.
- Bournoutian, George (2021). From the Kur to the Aras: A Military History of Russia's Move into the South Caucasus and the First Russo-Iranian War, 1801–1813. Brill. ISBN 978-90-04-44515-4.
