= Meghri Fortress =

Armenian fortress

Meghri Fortress Մեղրու բերդ
- Meghri, Syunik Province, Armenia
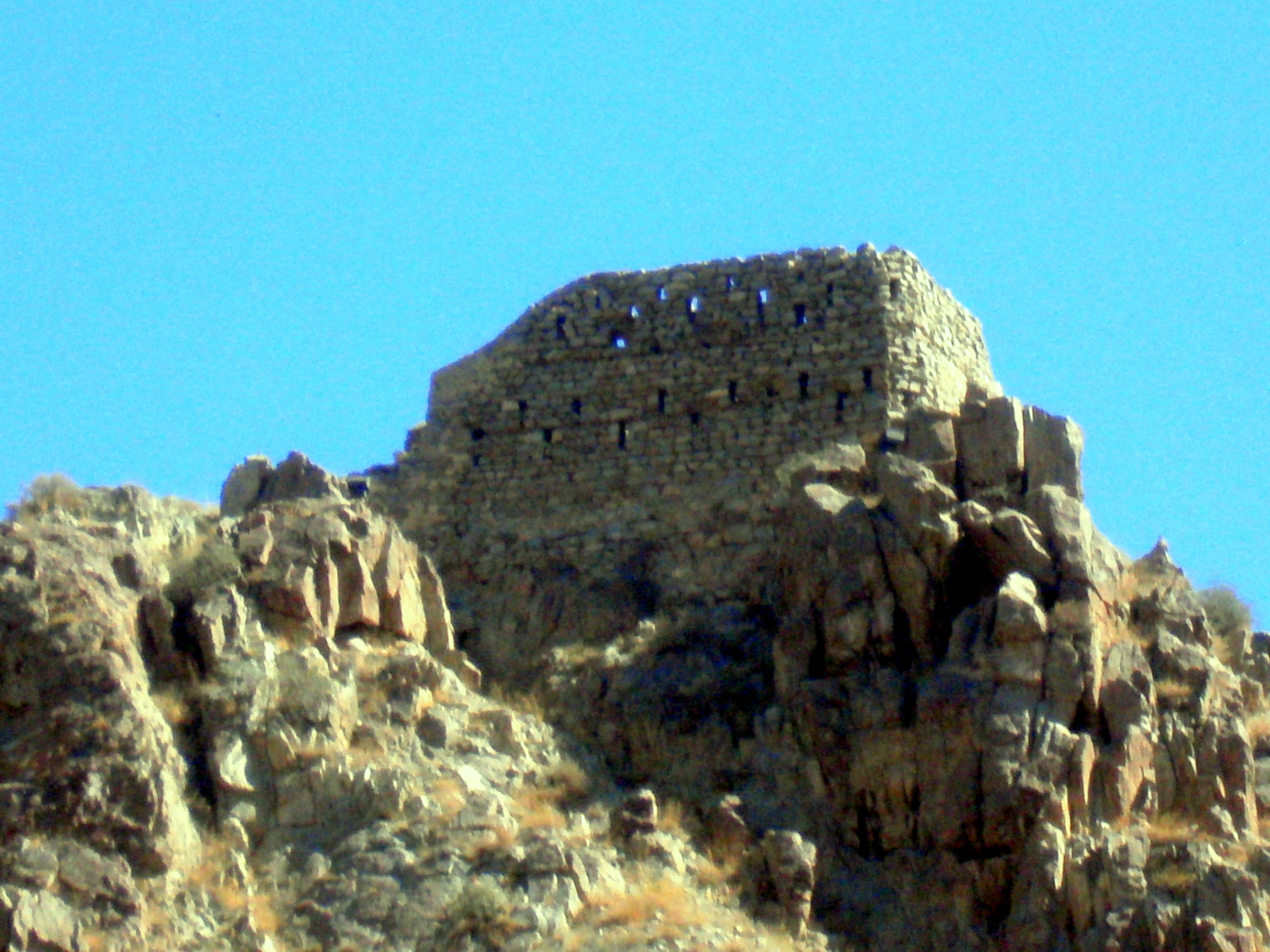
- Fortification walls of Meghri Fortress

Site information
- Type: Fortress
- Open to the public: Yes

Location
- Coordinates: 38°54′08″N 46°14′54″E

Site history
- Built: 1083 rebuilt: 18th century
- Materials: Stone
- Demolished: Partially

Meghri Fortress (Armenian: Մեղրու բերդ) is an 11th-century Armenian fortress located in the town of Meghri. It is located on a hill overlooking the old section of the town from the north.

== History ==
Meghri Fortress was probably built during the years of formation and empowerment of the Syunik Kingdom (late X-XI cc.). For the first time, the fortress was mentioned by the historian St. Orbelian (XIII century) in his work "History of the Province of Sisakan", according to which in 1083 the fortress was already built. Later, the fortress was not mentioned, but it undoubtedly played an active role during the military operations in Arevik, a province in the south of Syunik, as a result of which it was subjected to many destructions and reconstructions, so it is difficult to restore its original structure. In 1103, after the capture of the Kapan, Meghri Fortress, together with other fortresses, was preserved during the reign of King Grigor II of Syunik. In 1152, the Seljuk Turks captured Meghri Fortress. At the beginning of the XVIII century, military commander Davit Bek rebuilt the fortress to withstand the attacks of the Turkish troops.

== Design ==
Meghri Fortress differs in its construction. It had six separate towers without defensive walls. The towers were of two types: round (four towers) and rectangular (two towers). Inside the walls, along the perimeter of the towers, several rows of wooden beams were used as earthquake-resistant zones. The walls of the standing towers become narrower externally while internally they are vertical. Both the rectangular and the round towers had two floors (each floor is about two meters high). The entries of the towers are from the north. The advantage of such an orientation was that the fortress was protected from the north by natural barriers, so the enemy could attack only from the opposite side. In the XVIII century, the towers were reconstructed and taking into consideration the use of firearms, embrasures with a radial arrangement were added. Nowadays five towers are preserved.
