= Meghri (river) =

River in Armenia

Meghri Meghriget
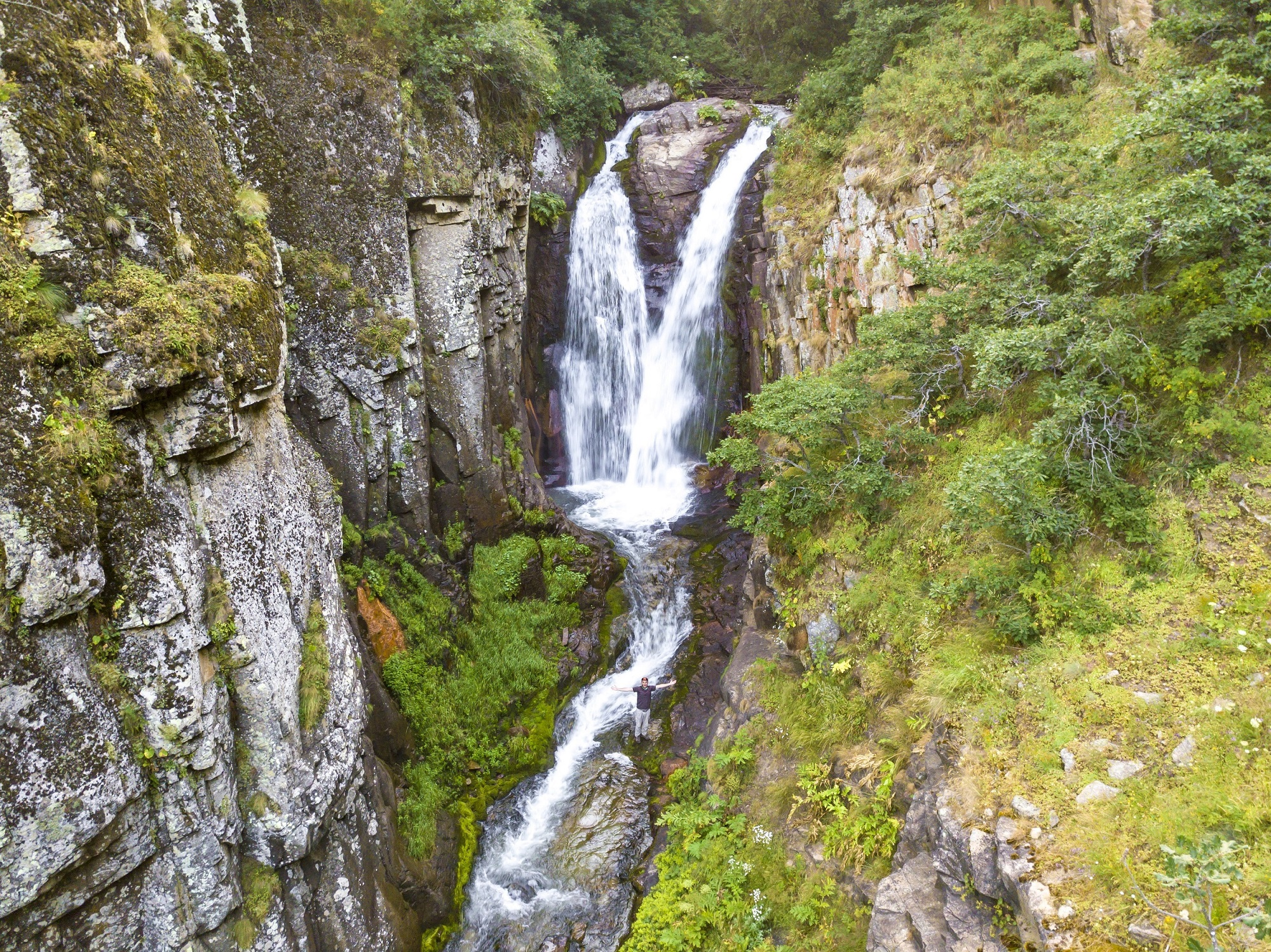
- Native name: Մեղրի

Location
- Country: Armenia
- Province: Syunik

Physical characteristics
- Source: Blue Lake
  - elevation: 3,250 m (10,660 ft)
- Mouth: Aras
  - location: Meghri
  - coordinates: 38°53′19″N 46°16′0″E
  - elevation: 380 m (1,250 ft)
- Length: 36 km (22 mi)
- Discharge
  - average: 3.53 m^{3} (125 cu ft)

The Meghri (Armenian: Մեղրի, pronounced [mɛɣˈɾi], also known as the Meghriget) is a tributary of the Aras River in the Syunik Province of southern Armenia. It descends steeply through the province, stretching 36 kilometres (22 mi) in length from its headwaters at Blue Lake to its confluence with the Aras, as a left tributary, south of the town of Meghri.

== Geography ==
The Meghri is a river in Syunik Province, Armenia. It descends sharply over its 36-kilometer course, from 3,250 metres (10,660 ft) above sea level at its headwaters at Blue Lake, to an altitude of 380 metres (1,250 ft) at its confluence with the Aras.

The river's catchment area totals 336 square kilometres (130 mi^{2}). It has an average discharge of 3.53 cubic metres (125 cu ft) per second, although this can increase dramatically during periods of flooding, up to a recorded high of 87.5 cubic metres (3,090 cu ft) in March 1956.

A portion of the upper Meghri is within Arevik National Park. The Meghri valley is the hottest and driest region in Armenia.

== Flora and fauna ==
Due to its geographical separation from the rest of Armenia, several species of plants that grow within the Meghri basin are not found elsewhere in the country. It displays strong similarities with the flora of adjacent regions within Iran.

The Eurasian otter is found in the Meghri river basin. Endangered in Armenia, otter populations have seen some recovery in the basin, where they frequently steal fish and pose a nuisance to aquaculture. However, lower water levels on account of the installation of hydroelectric stations has caused many to migrate to the Aras itself.
