= Meghri Dam =

Meghri Hydroelectric Project
- Interactive map of Meghri Hydroelectric Project
- Country: Armenia; Iran
- Location: Meghri
- Status: Proposed
- Construction began: pending

Dam and spillways
- Type of dam: Diversion dam for run-of-river pipes
- Impounds: Aras River

Power Station
- Turbines: 2x 50 MW (67,000 hp) each
- Installed capacity: 100 MW (130,000 hp) (max. planned)

The Meghri hydroelectric project (also known as the Meghri Dam or Aras Watershed Dam) is a hydroelectric project planned on the Aras River near Armenia's southern town of Meghri on the Armenia–Iran border.

The joint Iranian–Armenia project was proposed in the 1990s and was discussed between Iranian and Armenian authorities. Intergovernmental agreements between Armenia and Iran were signed in 2007 and 2008. On 14 April 2009, energy ministries of Armenia and Iran signed a memorandum on financing construction of the Meghri power station of Armenian side. The dam and power stations construction contract was signed on 16 October 2010 with Farab Sepasad Company. A ceremony on 17 November 2012, attended by Iran's Minister of Energy and the Armenian President, officially began construction.

The basic studies were carried out by Arm-Hydroenergo-Project Company and Mahab-E-Qods Consulting Engineers Company in 1999. The Meghri station was to be operated by Iran for 15 years after which it will be returned to Armenia free of charge. However, construction has been delayed. As of 2017, the Armenian government’s Deputy Minister of Energy Infrastructures and Natural Resources Hayk Harutyunyanays said "Although the agreement has long been in force, the Iranian company has not made any investments to this day, so the governments of Armenia and Iran have to look for another investor." The project is expected to cost US$400 million.

== Power stations ==
The complex was planned to comprise two 130 megawatts (170,000 hp) hydroelectric power stations — Ghare Chiler (also transcribed Gharachilar or Karachinar) on the Iranian side and Meghri on Armenia side. Due to the sufficient difference in elevation and the presence of Aras Dam on the upstream, the power stations will be run-of-river type, wherein water is taken into pipes at a high elevation, carried downslope to powerhouses at lower elevation, then discharged back to the river. Both power station were conceived to have two turbines with a capacity of 65 megawatts (87,000 hp) each. Revised study of river flows now indicates total Meghri generation capacity would be approximately 100 MW.

== See also ==
- Aras Dam
- Energy in Armenia
- List of power stations in Iran
