= Poqr Tagh =

Coordinates: 40°10′46″N 44°32′34″E

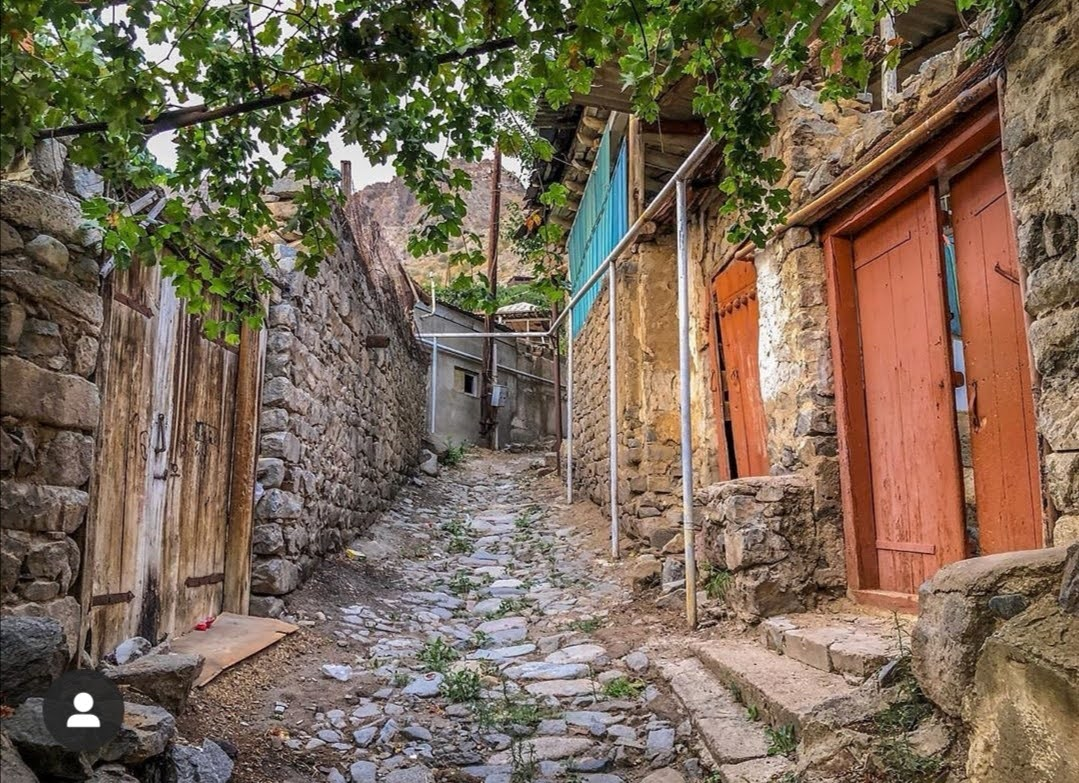
- A street in Poqr Tagh, Meghri
- Interactive map of Poqr Tagh
- Country: Armenia
- Marz (Province): Syunik Province
- City: Meghri

Area
  - Total: 5 ha (12 acres)
- Time zone: UTC+4 ( )

Poqr Tagh (Armenian: Փոքր թաղ, lit. 'little neighborhood') or Old Town, is a historical neighbourhood in the Armenian site of Meghri located on a hill in its western side and overlooking the Mets Tagh.

== Structure ==
The district is composed of narrow streets between the two and three story terraced houses, which have colored multi-paned windows. The buildings of the district are called "People's houses" due to the usage of other's roof as a terrace for another building. Due to the neglect and change of lifestyle, the majority of the houses are in ruins, while the others are threatened.

== History ==
Poqr Tagh is one of the oldest town districts in Armenia. Its architecture can be traced to the resettlement of the city due to the 1639 Treaty of Zuhab.

On December 29, 2005, Armenian Government included Poqr Tagh in the list of historical and cultural assets of Armenia, putting it under the state protection.

In 2004 there was a program by Izmirlian Foundation to revive the district, which resulted in a house dating back to 19-th century being reconstructed. Lusine Galajyan, Country director of the Izmirlian Foundation, says that the project requires a six million US dollars investment to be fully implemented. As of 7 September 2024, there is a project is going on by Armenian government to restore the old district and is planned to be completed in December 2024.

== Landmarks ==
=== Surb Hovhannes Church ===
Surb Hovhanness church, dating back to 17th century, is famous for its wall paintings and is located on the very top of Poqr Tagh. It is built out of local basalt stone with a brick dome and rectangular hall, inscribed in the list of Meghri cultural and historical heritage.

== Gallery ==
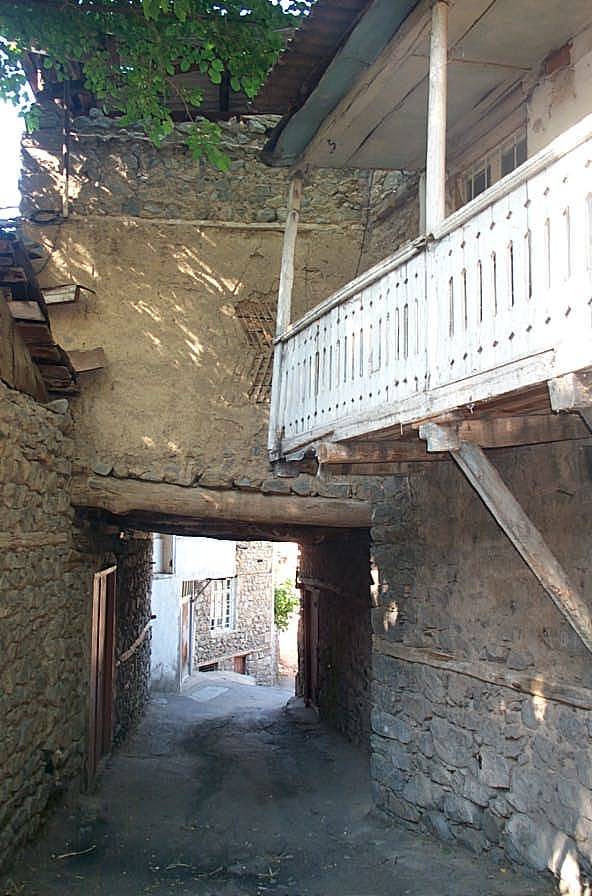
A narrow street in Poqr Tagh from Mets Tagh

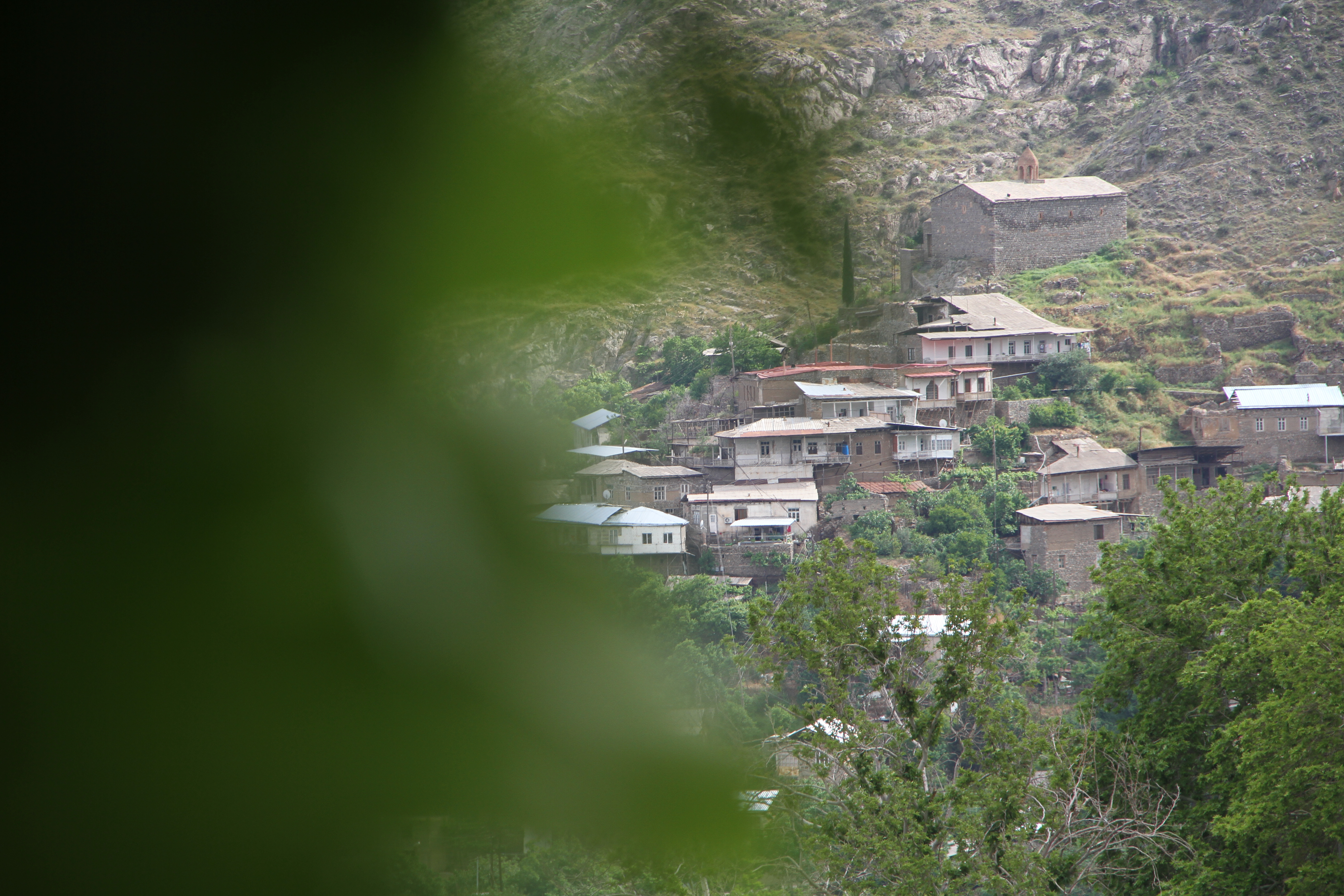
A view on Poqr Tagh

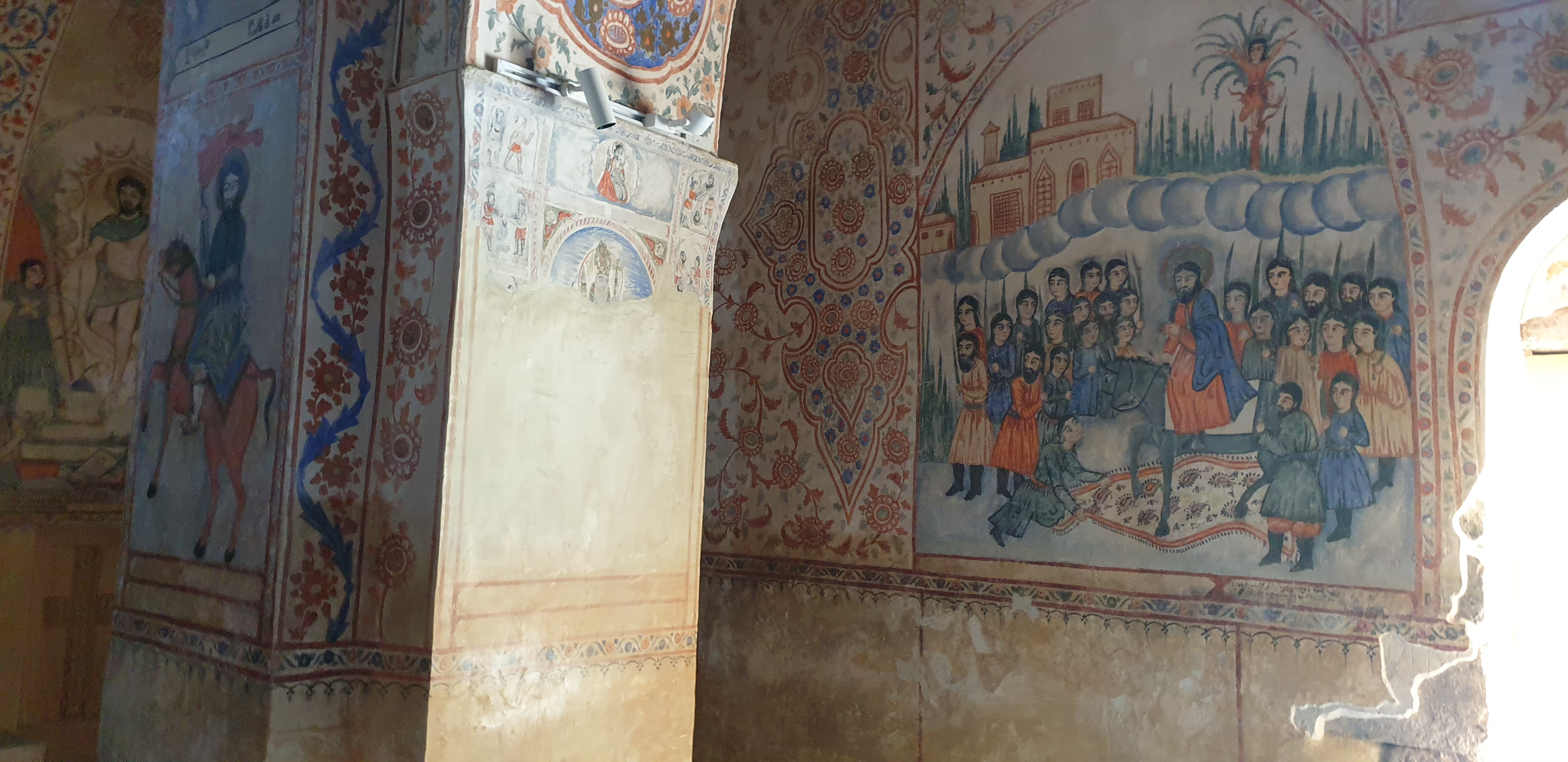
Interior of Surp Hovhannes Church

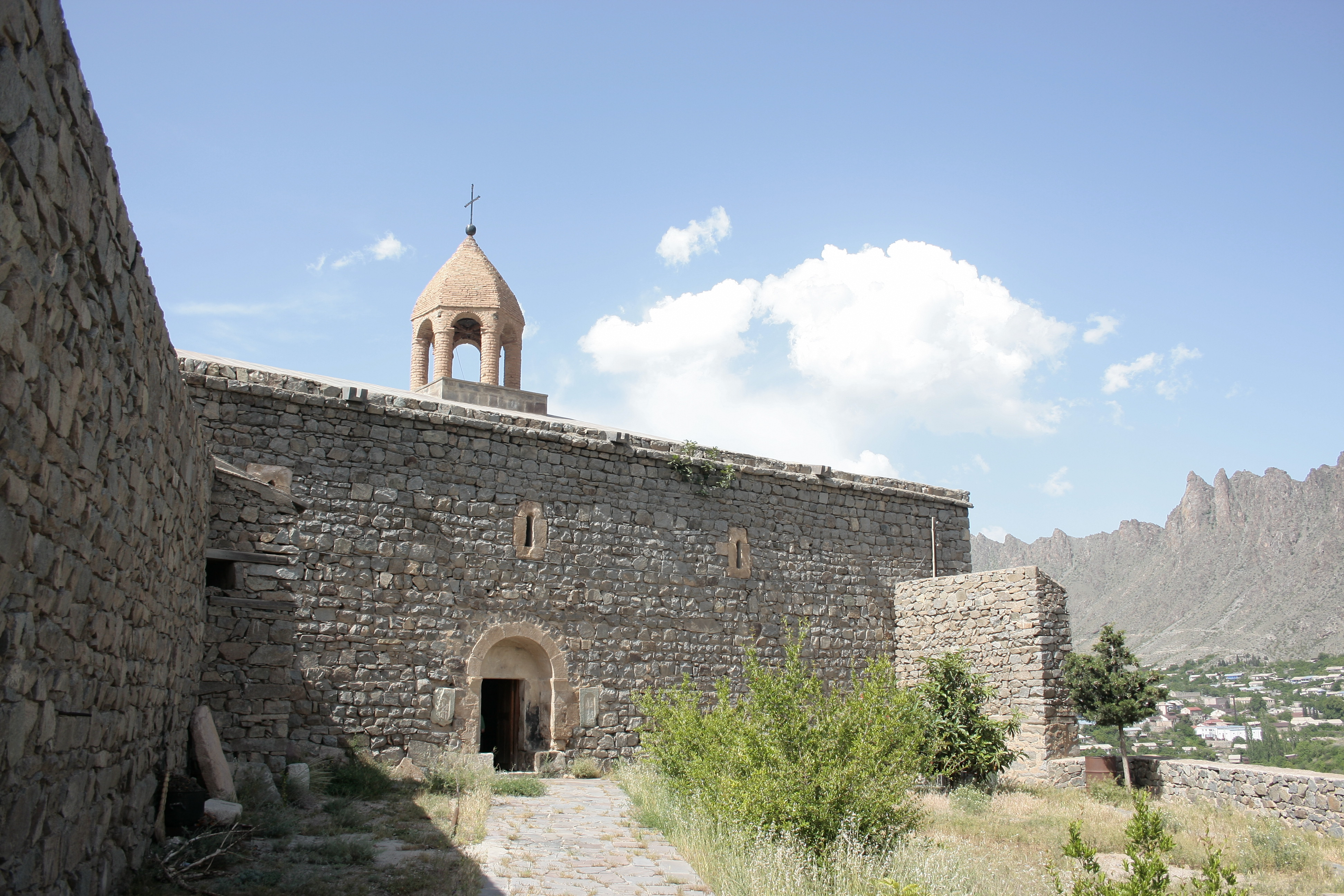
Surb Hovhannes church

== See also ==
- Kond
- Meghri
- Kumayri
- Mets Tagh
