= Kürəkçi =

Kurakchi
- Municipality
- Azerbaijani: Kürəkçi
- Location within Azerbaijan
- Coordinates: 38°53′01″N 48°07′45″E
- Country: Azerbaijan
- District: Yardimli

Population
  - Total: 1,851
- Time zone: UTC+4 (AZT)

Kürəkçi (also, Kurakchi and Kurekchi) is a village and municipality in the Yardimli District of Azerbaijan. It has a population of 1,851. The municipality consists of the villages of Kürəkçi and Gərsavan.

== Geography ==
The village is located near the river Kurakchi // Kurekchi.

== Toponym ==
The name of the village is given by the "Caucasian Calendar" of 1856 in local language letters (ﮐﻮﺮﮐﭽﯽ). In Russian pre-revolutionary literature, can be found the spellings "Kurakchi", "Kyurakchi" or two spellings: "Kurakchi (Kurekchi)".

== History ==
During the 19th and 20th centuries, Kurakchi belonged to the Russian Empire. The village belonged to Sebidaj mahal of the Shamakhi province. Later, it was part of Lankaran district of Baku province.

In the 1880s, Kurakchi and a number of other settlements (the spelling has been preserved: "Arvana", "Mamulghan", "Mila" with the village of "Urakaran", "Peshtasar" with the village of "Asadabad" and "Uzu") belonged to the Peshtasar rural community of the Zuvand site of the above-mentioned district. The above-mentioned settlements (Arvana, Asadabad, Kurakchi, Mamulghan, Mila, Peshtasar, Urakaran and Uzu) were part of the Peshtasar community at the beginning of the 20th century.

In 1930, the Vargaduz district was formed, which was later renamed Yardimli. As of 1 January 1961, Kurakchi and 8 other settlements (Chay Uzu, Dagh Uzu, Nisagala, Garagaya, Urakaran, Avur, Avun and Garsavan) belonged to Chay Uzu village council, and as of 1 January 1977, three settlements (Kurakchi, Garsavan and Avash) already belonged to the Kurakchi village council.

== Population ==
=== 19th century ===
According to the "Caucasian calendar" of 1856, the village of Kurakchi of Sebidaj mahal was inhabited by "Tatars"-Shiites (Azerbaijani-Shiites), who spoke "Tatar" (Azerbaijani) among themselves.

According to the lists of populated areas of Baku province of 1870, compiled on the basis of the data of the office description of the province of 1859 to 1864, there were 23 households and 249 residents (132 men and 117 women), who were "Tatars"-Shiites (Azerbaijani-Shiites). According to the data of 1873, published in the “Collection of Information about the Caucasus” edited by N. K. Seidlitz in 1879, the village already had 30 households and 265 residents (148 men and 117 women), also consisting of “Tatars”-Shiites (Azerbaijanis-Shiites).

From the materials extracted of the family lists of 1886, it is clear that all 294 residents (158 men and 136 women; 32 dym) were “Tatars”-Shiites (Azerbaijanis-Shiites), and in terms of class, peasants.

=== 20th century ===
According to the materials provided by the publication "Administrative Division of the ASSR", prepared in 1933 by the Department of National Economic Accounting of the Azerbaijan SSR (AzNEA), as of 1 January 1933, in Kurakchi (Kyrəkci) there were 73 households and 580 people of the indigenous population (that is, registered within this village), including 285 men and 295 women. These same materials indicate that the entire Kurakchi village council of the Vargaduz district (Arvana, Avar, Kirevich, Kurakchi and Karauldash) in terms of nationality was 100% “Turks” (Azerbaijanis).
