= Sino-Japanese vocabulary =

Japanese words of Chinese origin

Sino-Japanese vocabulary, also known as kango (Japanese: 漢語; pronounced [kaŋɡo], "Han words"), is a subset of Japanese vocabulary that originated in Chinese or was created from elements borrowed from Chinese. Most Sino-Japanese words were borrowed in the 5th–9th centuries AD, from Early Middle Chinese into Old Japanese. Some grammatical structures and sentence patterns can also be identified as Sino-Japanese.

Kango is one of three broad categories into which the Japanese vocabulary is divided. The others are native Japanese vocabulary (yamato kotoba) and borrowings from other, mainly Western languages (gairaigo). It has been estimated that about 60% of the words contained in modern Japanese dictionaries are kango, and that about 18–20% of words used in common speech are kango. (Note: As measured by the National Institute for Japanese Language in its study of language use in NHK broadcasts from April to June 1989.) The usage of such kango words increases in formal or literary contexts, and in expressions of abstract or complex ideas.

Kango, the use of Chinese-derived words in Japanese, is to be distinguished from kanbun, which is historical Literary Chinese written by Japanese in Japan. Both kango in modern Japanese and classical kanbun have Sino-xenic linguistic and phonetic elements also found in Korean and Vietnamese: that is, they are "Sino-foreign", meaning that they are not pure Chinese but have been mixed with the native languages of their respective nations. Such words invented in Japanese, often with novel meanings, are called wasei-kango. Many of them were created during the Meiji Restoration to translate non-Asian concepts and have been reborrowed into Chinese.

Kango is also to be distinguished from gairaigo of Chinese origin, namely words borrowed from modern Chinese dialects, some of which may be occasionally spelled with Chinese characters or kanji just like kango. For example, 北京 (Pekin, "Beijing") which was borrowed from a modern Chinese dialect, is not kango, whereas 北京 (Hokkyō, "Northern Capital", a name for Kyoto), which was created with Chinese elements, is kango.

== Background ==
Ancient China's political and economic influence in the region shaped the languages of Japanese, Korean, Vietnamese and other languages in East and Southeast Asia throughout history in a manner comparable to Koine Greek and Latin in the West. The Middle Chinese word for gunpowder, Chinese: 火藥 (Late Middle Chinese pronunciation: [xwa˧˥jak]), is rendered as hwayak in Korean, and as kayaku in Japanese.

At the time of initial contact, Old Japanese lacked a writing system, whereas Chinese had a long-established script and a substantial body of academic and scientific information. Classical Chinese, known as Kanbun in Japanese, became the earliest written language in Japan, serving as the medium for science, scholarship, religion, and government. The Kanbun writing system essentially required every literate Japanese to be competent in written Chinese, although it is unlikely that many Japanese people were then fluent in spoken Chinese. Chinese pronunciation was approximated in words borrowed from Chinese into Japanese.

Chinese loanwords also reshaped Japanese phonology, introducing closed syllables (CV(N), alongside CV) and length becoming a phonetic feature with the development of both long vowels and long consonants. (See Early Middle Japanese: Phonological developments for details.)

== Grammar ==
Sino-Japanese words are almost exclusively nouns, of which many are verbal nouns or adjectival nouns, meaning that they can act as verbs or adjectives. Verbal nouns can be used as verbs by appending suru (する; "do") (e.g. benkyō suru (勉強する; do studying; study)), while an adjectival noun uses -na (〜な) instead of -no (〜の) (usual for nouns) when acting attributively.

In Japanese, verbs and adjectives (that is, inflecting adjectives) are closed classes, and despite the large number of borrowings from Chinese, virtually none of these became inflecting verbs or adjectives, instead being conjugated periphrastically as above.

In addition to the basic verbal noun + suru form, verbal nouns with a single-character root often experienced sound changes, such as -suru (〜する) → -zuru (〜ずる) → -jiru (〜じる), as in kinjiru (禁じる; forbid), and some cases where the stem underwent a sound change, as in tassuru (達する; reach), from tatsu (達).

== Sino-Japanese and on'yomi ==
The term kango is usually identified with on'yomi (音読み, "sound reading"), a system of pronouncing Chinese characters in a way that at one point approximated the original Chinese. On'yomi is also known as the 'Sino-Japanese reading', and is opposed to kun'yomi (訓読み, "reading by meaning") under which Chinese characters are assigned to, and read as, native Japanese vocabulary.

There are cases where the distinction between on'yomi and kun'yomi does not correspond to etymological origin. Chinese characters created in Japan, called kokuji (国字), normally only have kun'yomi, but some kokuji do have on'yomi. One such character is 働 (as in 働く hataraku, "to work"), which was given the on'yomi dō (from the on'yomi of its phonetic component, 動) when used in compounds with other characters, e.g. in 労働 rōdō ("labor"). Similarly, the character 腺 ("gland") has the on'yomi sen (from the on'yomi of its phonetic component, 泉 sen "spring, fountain"), e.g. in 扁桃腺 hentōsen "tonsils"; it was intentionally created as a kango and does not have a kun'yomi at all. Although not originating in Chinese, both of these are regarded as 'Sino-Japanese'.

That a word is the kun'yomi of a kanji is not a guarantee that the word is native to Japanese. There are a few Japanese words that, although they appear to have originated in borrowings from Chinese, have such a long history in the Japanese language that they are regarded as native and are thus treated as kun'yomi, e.g., 馬 uma "horse" and 梅 ume. These words are not regarded as belonging to the Sino-Japanese vocabulary.

== Words made in Japan ==
While much Sino-Japanese vocabulary was borrowed from Chinese, a considerable amount was created by the Japanese themselves as they coined new words using Sino-Japanese forms. These are known as wasei-kango (和製漢語; Japanese-created kango); compare to wasei-eigo (和製英語; Japanese-created English).

Many Japanese-created kango refer to uniquely Japanese concepts. Examples include daimyō (大名), waka (和歌), haiku (俳句), geisha (芸者), chōnin (町人), matcha (抹茶), sencha (煎茶), washi (和紙), jūdō (柔道), kendō (剣道), Shintō (神道), shōgi (将棋), dōjō (道場), seppuku (切腹), and Bushidō (武士道).

Another miscellaneous group of words were coined from Japanese phrases or crossed over from kun'yomi to on'yomi. Examples include henji (返事 meaning 'reply', from native 返り事 kaerigoto 'reply'), rippuku (立腹 'become angry', based on 腹が立つ hara ga tatsu, literally 'belly/abdomen stands up'), shukka (出火 'fire starts or breaks out', based on 火が出る hi ga deru), and ninja (忍者 from 忍びの者 shinobi-no-mono meaning 'person of stealth'). In Chinese, the same combinations of characters are often meaningless or have a different meaning. Even a humble expression like gohan (ご飯 or 御飯 'cooked rice') is a pseudo-kango and not found in Chinese. One interesting example that gives itself away as a Japanese coinage is kaisatsu-guchi (改札口 literally 'check ticket gate'), meaning the ticket barrier at a railway station.

More recently, the best-known example is the prolific numbers of kango coined during the Meiji era on the model of Classical Chinese to translate modern concepts imported from the West; when coined to translate a foreign term (rather than simply a new Japanese term), they are known as yakugo (訳語; translated word, equivalent). Often they use corresponding morphemes to the original term, and thus qualify as calques. These terms include words for new technology, like 電話 denwa ('telephone'), and words for Western cultural categories which the Sinosphere had no exact analogue of on account of partitioning the semantic fields in question differently, such as 科学 kagaku ('science'), 社会 shakai ('society'), and 哲学 tetsugaku ('philosophy'). While many terms were coined afresh (such as 科学 and 哲学), many were repurposed classical Chinese compounds, whose meanings were tenuously similar to their western counterparts. Here are a few examples:

Word	Classical Chinese meaning	Modern meaning
bunka (文化)	teaching of the humanities	culture
butsuri (物理)	workings of things	physics
hakushi (博士)	imperial academician	doctor
hikan (悲観)	compassionate outlook	pessimism
hentai (変態)	transformation	metamorphosis; abnormality; lewdness
jiyū (自由)	self-determination	freedom; liberty
kakumei (革命)	dynastic change	revolution
kato (過渡)	crossing a river	transition
keizai (経済)	governance	economy
kyōwa (共和)	cooperative harmony; Gonghe Regency	non-monarchical government; republicanism
minshu (民主)	monarch	republican president; republicanism; democracy
mujun (矛盾)	(all-breaking) spear and (never-broken) shield	contradiction
shakai (社会)	earth-deity-worshipping community	society
soshiki (組織)	weaving; formation	biological tissue

Notably, the names of the military ranks used throughout the Sinosphere were neither coined anew nor repurposed from Classical Chinese, but were based on the ranks under the Ritsuryō government. Certain military agencies, such as the Konoefu (近衛府), the Hyōefu (兵衛府) and the Emonfu (衛門府), were headed by officials titled with shō (将), sa (佐) and i (尉) (see the Japanese article, 四等官), which later corresponded to "general officer", "senior officer" and "junior officer" in the Imperial Japanese Armed Forces and adopted by other militaries in China, Korea and Vietnam. See the articles for these ranks for more (Ranks of the Imperial Japanese Army, Comparative military ranks of Korea, Ranks of the People's Liberation Army Ground Force, Ranks of the People's Liberation Army Navy, Ranks of the People's Liberation Army Air Force, Republic of China Armed Forces rank insignia, Vietnamese military ranks and insignia).

Despite resistance from some contemporary Chinese intellectuals, many wasei kango were "back-borrowed" into Chinese around the turn of the 20th century. Such words from that time are thoroughly assimilated into the Chinese lexicon, but translations of foreign concepts between the two languages now occur independently of each other. These "back-borrowings" gave rise to Mandarin diànhuà (from 電話 denwa), kēxué (from 科学 kagaku), shèhuì (from 社会 shakai) and zhéxué (from 哲学 tetsugaku). Since the sources for the wasei kango included ancient Chinese texts as well as contemporary English-Chinese dictionaries, some of the compounds—including 文化 bunka ('culture', Mandarin wénhuà) and 革命 kakumei ('revolution', Mandarin gémìng)—might have been independently coined by Chinese translators, had Japanese writers not coined them first. A similar process of reborrowing occurred in the modern Greek language, which took back words like τηλεγράφημα telegrafíma ('telegram') that were coined in English from Greek roots. Many of these words have also been borrowed into Korean and Vietnamese, forming (a modern Japanese) part of their Sino-Korean and Sino-Vietnamese vocabularies.

Alongside these translated terms, the foreign word may be directly borrowed as gairaigo. The resulting synonyms have varying use, usually with one or the other being more common. For example, 野球 yakyū and ベースボール bēsubōru both translate as 'baseball', where the yakugo 野球 is more common. By contrast, 庭球 teikyū and テニス tenisu both translate as 'tennis', where the gairaigo テニス is more common. Note that neither of these is a calque – they translate literally as 'field ball' and 'garden ball'. ('Base' is 塁 rui, but 塁球 ruikyū is an uncommon term for 'softball', which itself is normally ソフトボール sofutobōru).

Finally, quite a few words appear to be Sino-Japanese but are varied in origin, written with ateji (当て字)— kanji assigned without regard for etymology. In many cases, the characters were chosen only to indicate pronunciation. For example, sewa ('care, concern') is written 世話, using the on'yomi "se" + "wa" ('household/society' + 'talk'); although this word is not Sino-Japanese but a native Japanese word believed to derive from sewashii, meaning 'busy' or 'troublesome'; the written form 世話 is simply an attempt to assign plausible-looking characters pronounced "se" and "wa". Other ateji of this type include 面倒 mendō ('face' + 'fall down' = 'bother, trouble') and 野暮 yabo ('fields' + 'livelihood' = 'uncouth'). (The first gloss after each character roughly translates the kanji; the second is the meaning of the word in Japanese.)

== Types of on'yomi ==
On'yomi were originally used in ondoku (音読 "sound reading"), the Japanese system for reading aloud texts in the Middle Chinese (MC) language. A huge number of loanwords entered the Japanese language from Middle Chinese, intermediated by these conventionalized pronunciations. There are different types of on'yomi for Sino-Japanese vocabulary, depending mainly on the time period of borrowing.

Go-on (呉音 "Wu sound") readings represent the first major wave of Chinese borrowing in the 5th and 6th centuries, coinciding with the introduction of Buddhism in Japan. Buddhist teachings along with the Chinese language were largely transmitted by scholars and monks through the Korean Peninsula, probably especially from Baekje, though it is unclear to what extent this fact influenced the Go-on pronunciations. It is often thought that Go-on pronunciations are based on Middle Chinese varieties spoken in the Wu region during the Six Dynasties period, and it seems likely that they are derived from not a single Chinese dialect, but an amalgam of dialects, and that the Chinese taught in Japan varied in pronunciation across different schools and sects, which had pronunciation norms that gradually shifted from spoken Chinese in China. Certain genres of modern vocabulary largely use Go-on readings, especially words related to Buddhism and law.

Kan-on (漢音 "Han sound") readings were introduced in the 7th through 9th centuries during the Tang dynasty, and are based on the central Chang'an pronunciation of Middle Chinese. While there was a large-scale effort to replace Go-on readings with Kan-on readings when pronouncing Chinese texts in Japan, this effort did not extend to changing the pronunciation of borrowed words that were already used in Japanese. Massive borrowing of Chinese loanwords continued during this period, and these new borrowings reflected the new Kan-on readings. Today, Kan-on readings are the most commonly encountered type of on'yomi.

Kan'yō-on (慣用音 "customary sound") readings are not considered to follow the regular patterns for adapting either Go-on or Kan-on readings, but are commonly encountered in existing Sino-Japanese words. In some cases, the Kan'yō-on reading is in fact a regular development of the original Go or Kan on'yomi in a particular environment. For example, 拉 (MC lop) has the Kan'yō-on reading /raQ/ (or /ra/) in all Sino-Japanese words, which is the regular development of earlier /rap(u)/ before a voiceless obstruent. A common irregularity for Kan'yō-on is an unexpected voicing value for an initial obstruent. For example, 斬 (MC tʂɛm^{X}) is read in all Sino-Japanese words as /zaN/ rather than the expected Kan-on reading /saN/.

Tō-on/Sō-on (唐音 "Tang sound" or 宋音 "Song sound") readings were introduced mostly from the 12th century onward, during and after the Song dynasty. "Tang" was in this context used to mean "Chinese" (i.e. "real Chinese pronunciation"), with no intended connection to the earlier Tang Dynasty. Due to their more recent borrowing, Tō-on readings are sometimes more recognizably similar to Modern Chinese pronunciations. There are far fewer Sino-Japanese loanwords with Tō-on readings compared to Go-on and Kan-on readings. Dictionaries do not attempt to provide a Tō-on reading for each kanji as many do for Go-on and Kan-on readings.

Go-on and Kan-on readings have a special status when compared with other on'yomi types. Arising initially out of the need to be able to read any Chinese text aloud using ondoku, there is a long-standing practice of providing a Go and Kan reading for every kanji, even those which have never actually been used in borrowed Sino-Japanese vocabulary. The readings which are not actually encountered in Sino-Japanese loanwords were largely codified in the Edo period through the philological study of Chinese rime tables. These readings are given in many dictionaries, though for the less common kanji there is sometimes disagreement between sources.

== Correspondences between Middle Chinese and on'yomi ==
All characters used to write Middle Chinese represented a single syllable in the spoken language, made up of an "initial" (a single onset consonant), and a rime (the remainder of the syllable). Originally, the on'yomi for kanji attempted to closely match the Middle Chinese pronunciation for each character, while guided by the possible sounds and structures of Japanese as spoken at the time. In fact a number of new word shapes entered the language to accommodate the large influx of Chinese borrowings. Subsequently, many sound changes took place in Japanese, affecting both borrowed and native vocabulary. As such, on'yomi now often bear little resemblance to their original Middle Chinese source, and are even less similar to the pronunciation of the same characters in modern Chinese languages, which have undergone many changes from Middle Chinese. For example, 兄 (MC xjwæŋ) had the Go-on pronunciation [kwjaũ] when it was first borrowed, which subsequently developed to [kjaũ], then [kjau], then [kjɔː], and finally modern Japanese /kyō/ [kjoː].

=== Onsets (initials) ===
The Early Middle Chinese (EMC) initials have the following regular correspondences in Go and Kan on'yomi.

EMC	Go	Kan	EMC	Go	Kan	EMC	Go	Kan	EMC	Go	Kan
p^{(h)}	p>h		t^{(h)}, ʈ^{(h)}	t		ts^{(h)}, tʂ^{(h)}, tɕ^{(h)}	s		k^{(h)}	k	
b	b	p>h	d, ɖ	d	t	dz, dʐ, dʑ	z	s	g	g	k
m	m	b, m (Note: before an MC coda /ŋ/)	n, ɳ	n	d, n	ɲ	n	z	ŋ	g	
						s, ʂ, ɕ	s		x	k	
						z, ʑ	z	s	ɣ	g, Ø	k, Ø
			l	r		y (Note: Baxter represents this MC initial with <y> to distinguish it from the palatal glide <j> which appears at the beginning of many rimes. Karlgren distinguishes them as <j> and <i̯>.)	y, Ø		ʔ	Ø	

Aspiration was contrastive in Middle Chinese, but voiceless obstruents were adapted to Go and Kan pronunciations in the same way regardless of aspiration. However, many Kan'yō on'yomi exist with voiced obstruents corresponding to Middle Chinese unaspirated (and sometimes aspirated) voiceless obstruents. For example, 軍 (MC kjun) 'army' has the prescribed Go/Kan reading kun, but Kan'yō gun is the only reading actually used in Japanese. There are multiple reasons for the changes from the earlier Go to the later Kan pronunciations. These borrowings were drawn both from different times and different regions of China, and furthermore the Go pronunciations were likely intermediated through Korean Buddhist monks. However, there is little to support the claim that Go-on pronunciations were at the time of their introduction "less accurate" than their later Kan-on counterparts. The discrepancies between the two on'yomi categories are largely due to changes that took place between Early and Late Middle Chinese. The Early Middle Chinese (EMC) voiced obstruents became breathy voiced in Late Middle Chinese, e.g. [b > bʱ]. EMC [ɲ] became [ʝ̃], later becoming [ʐ] in Northern Chinese dialects. In the Japanese of both time periods, the voiced obstruents were prenasalized as [^{m}b, ^{n}d, ^{n}dz, ^{ŋ}g], helping to explain why they correspond to Middle Chinese nasals in Kan on'yomi. The Japanese consonant [p] developed first to [f] or [ɸ], and more recently to /h/ (with allophones [h, ɸ, ç]). Older [p] remains modern Japanese /p/ after the special moras /N/ and /Q/, and as such all /h/-initial on'yomi have regular variants with /p/ in this environment, for example Kan-on 筆 /hitu/ 'brush' vs. 鉛筆 /eN.pitu/ 'pencil'.

=== Rimes (medials and finals) ===
Middle Chinese rimes or "finals" contained a vowel, optional glides before the vowel (sometimes called "medials"), and an optional coda consonant /j, w, m, n, ŋ, p, t, k/— schematically (j)(w)V(C). The precise phonetic realization of the MC vowels is debated, and the set of vowels possible before different coda consonants varies considerably. When borrowed into Japanese, the more complicated MC vowel system was adapted to fit the Japanese five vowel system with /i, e, a, o, u/. MC rimes could begin with a glide /w/, /j/, or both /jw/. The earliest Japanese on'yomi allow the following sequences containing glides:

Historical kana (Note: The hiragana seen here did not develop until later from man'yōgana.) (codified c. 13th century) with glides /y, w/
や, よ, ゆ	ya, yo, yu
きや, きよ, きゆ (etc.)	Cya, Cyo, Cyu (C = any consonant)
わ, ゑ, ゐ, を	wa, we, wi, wo
くわ, ぐわ, くゑ, ぐゑ	kwa, gwa, kwe, gwe (Note: /kwe, gwe/ were originally indicated in the historical spelling, but are not used in the version that became standard.)
Additional "ancient" kana (used even earlier)
𛀁	ye (Note: Ancient spellings with /ye/ are not given in most dictionaries, and the tables below will not attempt to distinguish between on'yomi originally pronounced with /ye/ vs. /e/.)
ゐや, くゐや, ぐゐや	wya, kwya, gwya (Note: There is at least one example of ancient /kwyo/: 洫 くゐよく /kwyoku/.)
つゐ, づゐ, すゐ, ずゐ, るゐ, くゐ, ぐゐ, ゆゐ	twi, dwi, swi, zwi, rwi, kwi, gwi, ywi (Note: The Dai Kan-Wa Jiten treats the kana for /twi, dwi, swi, zwi, rwi, ywi/ as historical spellings, but all other sources treat them only as ancient.)

All of the /Cy/ and /Cw(y)/ sequences were newly introduced by borrowing from Chinese, though some would later arise in native vocabulary. By the advent of the "historical kana" spellings (13th century, lasting until 1946), the "ancient" kana sequences with /CwyV/ had long before lost their /w/, those with /Cwi/ had become /Cui, ki, gi/, and /ye/ merged with /e/. Later, /w/ was lost everywhere except in the sequence /wa/ with no preceding consonant. The presence of these glides in on'yomi is in some cases not easily predictable, for example 約 (MC ʔjak) has the Go reading yaku, while 央 (MC ʔjaŋ) has the jōyō Go reading ō, with yō listed as an alternate (but unused) Go reading.

The tables below show the regular correspondences between MC rimes and Japanese on'yomi (Go and Kan readings). The rimes are given in the transcription systems of Bernhard Karlgren, Li Rong, and William Baxter (see Middle Chinese finals for more transcription systems). Examples are given using the MC reconstructions from Karlgren's Grammata Serica Recensa (GSR), with the rimes transcribed using Baxter's system (see Character List for Karlgren's GSR). Japanese on'yomi are given in a phonemic transcription (see Japanese phonology).

Different MC rimes were restricted to following only certain MC initial consonants. Furthermore, the identity of the initial consonant sometimes results in a different regular outcome for the Japanese on'yomi. For the purposes of determining the Japanese on'yomi, the following sets of consonants can be distinguished:

	Japanese consonants	Middle Chinese consonants
P	p>h, b, m	p^{(h)}, b, m
T	t, d	t^{(h)}, d, ʈ^{(h)}, ɖ
S	s, z	ts^{(h)}, dz, tʂ^{(h)}, dʐ, tɕ^{(h)}, dʑ, s, z, ɕ, ʑ, ʂ, (j)
K	k, g	k^{(h)}, g, ŋ, x, ɣ
Ø	Ø (no consonant)	ʔ, (j), sometimes ɣ

Developments after the Japanese consonants /r/ (from MC /l/) and /n/ (from MC /n, ɳ, ɲ/) are noted where relevant. Like all palatal onsets, the MC onset /j/ (<y> in Baxter's transcription) appears only with MC rimes beginning in /j/, and generally patterns in on'yomi with MC /ʔ/ before the same rimes, but sometimes there is a distinction, where /j/ patterns with S. Where one of these five categories (P, T, S, K, Ø) appears in parentheses in the tables below, it refers to the adaptation of the MC rime after these different sets of consonants. Five columns in each table mark whether the given MC rime is found after each of these onset categories. A bullet (•) indicates that Go and Kan on'yomi exist corresponding to the given MC rime after the given onsets. When (~) appears, it indicates that an MC character exists which is expected to provide a relevant Japanese on'yomi, but it either has no identified reading, has on'yomi which are not clearly distinguished as Go vs. Kan, or has multiple MC pronunciations which make it impossible to determine which MC rime the on'yomi correspond to.

While the correspondences between MC rimes and Japanese on'yomi are rather consistent, there exists considerably more irregularity than is represented in these tables. Exceptional pronunciations are often found even for officially recognized Go and Kan readings. Furthermore, many kanji have Kan'yō-on readings, which by definition do not follow the regular correspondences, but appear in established Sino-Japanese words. The illusion of regularity is bolstered by the fact that lexicographers generally provide Go and Kan readings for characters based on their expected outcome, even when these readings are not actually employed in any Japanese word. Out of necessity, many of the examples shown below are of this type. Readings in the jōyō kanji list are highlighted in blue.

==== Vowel-final rimes ====
These MC rimes have no consonant after the vowel.

MC rime transcription			Occurs after					Japanese On readings		Examples
Karlgr.	Li	Baxter	P	T	S	K	Ø	Go	Kan	Middle Chinese, Go-on, Kan-on
ɑ	ɑ	a	•	•	•	•	•	a		波 pa, ha, ha; 多 ta, ta, ta; 左 tsa^{(H)}, sa, sa; 歌 ka, ka, ka; 荷 ɣa, ga, ka; 阿 ʔa, a, a
a	a	æ	•	•	•	•	•	e ya (T, S)	a	馬 mæ^{X}, me, ba; 把 pæ^{X}, he, ha; 麻 mæ, me, ba; 家, 加 kæ, ke, ka; 下, 夏 ɣæ^{X/H}, ge, ka; 亞/亜 ʔæ^{H}, e, a 咤 ʈæ^{H}, tya, ta; 砂, 沙 ʂæ, sya, sa; 詐 tʂæ^{H}, sya, sa
uɑ	uɑ	wa		•	•	•	~	a wa>a (K) wa (Ø)		惰 dwa^{X/H}, da, ta; 朵 twa^{X}, ta, ta; 坐 dzwa^{X}, za, sa 科 khwa, kwa>ka, kwa>ka; 戈 kwa, kwa>ka, kwa>ka; 臥 ŋwa^{H}, gwa>ga, gwa>ga 和 ɣwa, wa, kwa>ka
wa	ua	wæ			•	•	•	e we>e (K, Ø)	a wa>a (K) wa (Ø)	髽 tʂwæ, se, sa 化 xwæ, ke, kwa>ka; 瓦 ŋwæ^{X}, gwe>ge, gwa>ga 窪 ʔwæ, e, wa
i̯ɑ	iɑ	ja				•		ya		伽 gja, gya, kya
i̯a	ia	jæ			•		•	ya		蛇 ʑjæ, zya, sya; 且 tshjæ^{X}, sya, sya; 邪 zjæ, zya, sya; 卸 sjæ^{H}, sya, sya; 嗟 tsjæ, sa, sya; 也 jæ^{X}, ya/e, ya; 野, 耶, 埜 jæ, ya, ya
i̯wɑ	iuɑ	jwa								(no example in GSR)
uo	o	u	•	•	•	•	•	u	o wo>o (Ø)	步/歩 bu^{H}, bu, ho; 模 mu, mo, bo; 布 pu^{H}, hu, ho; 都 tu, tu, to; 圖/図 du, du>zu, to; 素 su^{H}, su, so; 租 tsu, su, so; 孤 ku, ku, ko 烏, 污 ʔu, u, wo>o
i̯wo	iɔ	jo		•	•	•	•	yo o (K, Ø)	yo	女 ɳjo^{X}, nyo, dyo>zyo; 豬/猪 ʈjo, tyo, tyo; 如 ɲjo^{(H)}, nyo, zyo; 緒 zjo^{X}, zyo, syo 去 khjo^{H}, ko, kyo; 拠 kjo^{H}, ko, kyo; 御 ŋjo^{H}, go, gyo; 居 kjo, ko, kyo; 語 ŋjo, go, gyo; 於 ʔjo^{(H)}, o, yo
i̯u	io	ju	•	•	•	•	•	u	u yu (S)	武 mju^{X}, mu, bu; 無 mju, mu, bu; 膚 pju, hu, hu; 屢/屡 lju^{H}, ru, ru; 俁 ŋju^{X}, gu, gu; 芋 ɣju^{H}, u, u 須 sju, su, syu; 娵 tsju, su, syu; 聚 dzju^{H}, zu, syu; 雛 dʐju, zyu, su

==== Rimes ending in a palatal glide ====
These MC rimes are analyzed as having a palatal glide after the vowel, though not all of the rimes end in a phonetic [j] in all MC transcription systems. These mostly end up as Japanese ai, e, ē, i, or ui.

MC rime transcription			Occurs after					Japanese On readings		Examples
Karlgr.	Li	Baxter	P	T	S	K	Ø	Go	Kan	Middle Chinese, Go-on, Kan-on, (Kan'yō)
ɑ̌i	ɒi	oj		•	•	•	•	ai		代, 逮 doj^{H}, dai, tai; 臺/台 doj, dai, tai; 災 tsoj, sai, sai; 塞 soj^{H}, sai, sai; 改 koj^{X}, kai, kai; 愛 ʔoj, ai, ai
ɑi	ɑi	aj	•	•	•	•	~	ai		貝 pai^{H}, hai, hai; 賴 lai^{H}, rai, rai; 大 daj^{H}, dai, tai; 太 thai^{H}, tai, tai; 蔡 tshaj^{H}, sai, sai; 害 ɣaj, gai, kai
ə̆i	ɛi	ɛj	•		•	•	•	e	ai	拜/拝 pɛj^{H}, he, hai; 豺 dʐɛj, ze, sai; 界, 芥 kɛj^{H}, ke, kai; 薤 ɣɛj^{H}, ge, kai; 噫 ʔɛj^{H}, e, ai
ai	ɛ	ɛ	•		•	•	•	e	ai	罷 bɛ^{X}, be, hai; 買 mɛ^{X}, me, bai; 灑 ʂɛ^{X}, se, sai; 解 ɣɛ^{H/X}, ge, kai; 隘 ʔɛ^{H}, e, ai
ai	ai	æj	•	~		~	~	e	ai	勱 mæj^{H}, me, bai; 敗 pæj^{H}/bæj^{H}, he/be, hai
uɑ̌i	uɒi	woj	•	•	•	•	•	ai we>e (K, Ø)	ai wai>ai (K) wai (Ø)	孛 bwoj^{H}, bai, hai; 梅 mwoj, mai/me, bai; 餒 nwoj^{X}, nai, dai; 對/対 twoj^{H}, tai, tai; 敦 twoj, tai, tai, (tui); 倅 tshwoj^{H}, sai, sai 憒 kwoj^{H}, kwe>ke, kwai>kai; 傀 khwoj^{X}, kwe>ke, kwai>kai; 塊 khwoj/khwɛj, ke, kai 隈 ʔwoj, we>e, wai
wɑi	uɑi	waj		•	•	•	~	ai we>e (K, Ø)	ai wai>ai (K) wai (Ø)	脫/脱 thwaj, tai, tai; 最 tswaj^{H}, sai, sai 會/会 ɣwaj^{H}/kwaj^{H}, we>e/kwe>ke, kwai>kai; 外 ŋwai^{H}, gwe>ge, gwai>gai 薈 ʔwai^{H}, kai, kai, (wai); 繪/絵 ɣwaj^{H}, we>e, kwai>kai
wə̆i	uɛi	wɛj				•	•	ai we>e (K, Ø)	ai wai>ai (K) wai (Ø)	怪 kwɛj^{H}, kwe>ke, kwai>kai; 蒯 khwɛj^{H}, ke, kai; 乖 kwɛj, ke, kwai>kai 崴 ʔwɛj, we>e, wai; 壞/壊 ɣwɛj^{H}, we>e, kwai>kai; 淮 ɣwɛj, we>e, kwai>kai, (wai)
wai	uɛ	wɛ				•	•	ai we>e (K, Ø)	ai wai>ai (K) wai (Ø)	卦 kwɛ^{H}, ke, kai; 掛 kwɛ^{H}, kwe>ke, kwai>kai 蛙 ʔwɛ, we>e, wai
wai	uai	wæj			~	•	~	ai we>e (K, Ø)	ai wai>ai (K) wai (Ø)	話 ɣwæj^{H}, e, kai, (wa); 夬 kwæj^{H}, ke, kai; 快 khwæj^{H}, kwe>ke, kwai>kai
i̯ɛi	iɛi	jej		•	•	•	•	ai, (e) ei>ē, (e) (Ø)	ei>ē	厲 ljej^{H}, rai, rai/rē; 例 ljej^{H}, re, rē; 傺 ʈhjej^{H}, tai, tē; 世 ɕjej^{H}, se, sē; 際 tsjej^{H}, sai, sē; 晢 tɕjej^{H}, sai, sē; 憩 khjej^{H}, kai, kē 曳 jej^{H}, yei>ē, yei>ē; 裔 jej^{H}, ē, ē; 洩 jej^{H}, e, ē
i̯ɛi	jɛi	jiej	•			~		e, (ai)	ei>ē	蔽 pjiej^{H}, he, hē; 敝, 幣 bjiej^{H}, be, hē; 袂 mjiej^{H}, mai, bē
iei	ei	ej	•	•	•	•	•	ai e (K)	ei>ē	嬖 pej^{H}, hai, hē; 米 mej^{X}, mai, bē; 體/体 thej^{X}, tai, tē; 禮/礼 lej^{X}, rai, rē; 髢 dej^{H}, dai, tē; 西 sej, sai, sē; 壻 sej^{H}, sai, sē 枅 kej, ke, kē; 契 khej^{H}, ke, kē 翳 ʔej^{(H)}, ai, ē
i̯æi	iɐi	joj	•			•		o, (ai) e (K)	ai	廢/廃 pjoj^{H}, ho, hai; 吠 bjoj^{H}, bai/o, hai; 肺 phjoj^{H}, ho, hai 乂, 刈 ŋjoj^{H}, ge, gai
i̯wɛi	iuɛi	jwej		•	•	•	•	ai, e, ei>ē we>e (K, Ø)	ei>ē wei>ē (K, Ø)	錣 ʈjwej^{H}, tai, tē; 蚋 ɲjwej^{H}, ne/nē, zē; 脆 tshjwej^{H}, sai, sē, (zē); 毳 tshjwej^{H}/tʂhjwej^{H}, sai, sē; 彗 zjwej^{H}, zē, sē; 說/説 ɕjwej^{H}, se, sē, (zē); 贅 tɕjwej^{H}, se, sē, (zē) 蹶 kjwej^{H}, kwe>ke, kwei>kē; 銳/鋭 yjwej^{H}, ē, ē; 衛 ɣjwej^{H}, we>e, wei>ē
i̯wɛi	juɛi	jwiej								(no example in GSR)
i̯wæi	iuɐi	jwoj				•	•	we>e	wai>ai (K) wai (Ø)	喙 xjwoj, kwe>ke, kwai>kai 穢 ʔjwoj, e, wai
iwei	uei	wej				•		we>e	wei>ē	睽 khwej, ke, kē; 圭 kwej, kwe>ke, kwei>kē; 畦 ɣwej, we>e, kwei>kē; 惠/恵, 慧 ɣwej^{H}, we>e, kwei>kē
iě	ie	je	•	•	•	•	•	i		靡 mje^{X}, mi, bi; 池 ɖje, di>zi, ti; 紫 tsje^{X}, si, si; 施 ɕje, se, si; 奇 gje/kje, gi/ki, ki; 倚 ʔje^{H}, i, i
iě	je	jie	•			•	•	i		弭 mjie^{X}, mi, bi; 吡 phjie^{X}, bi, hi; 企 khjie^{H}, ki, ki; 縊 ʔjie^{H}, i, i
i	i	ij	•	•	•	•	•	i		泌 pij^{H}, hi, hi; 地 dij^{H}, di>zi, ti; 次 tshij^{H}, si, si; 自 dzij^{H}, zi, si; 肆 sij^{H}, si, si; 机 kij^{X}, ki, ki; 懿 ʔij^{H}, i, i
i	ji	jij	•		•	•	•	i		鼻 bjij^{H}, bi, hi; 寐 mjij^{H}, mi, bi; 二 ɲjij^{H}, ni, zi; 矢 ɕjij^{X}, si, si; 示 ʑjij^{H}, zi, si; 棄 khjij^{H}, ki, ki; 夷 jij, i, i; 伊 ʔjij, i, i
i	iǝ	i		•	•	•	•	i		置 ʈi^{H}, ti, ti; 治 ɖi^{(H)}/ɖij^{H}, di>zi, ti; 子 tsi^{X}, si, si; 史 ʂi^{X}, si, si; 己 ki^{X}, ko, ki; 熙 xi, ki, ki; 疑 ŋi, gi, gi; 醫/医 ʔi, i, i
ěi	iǝi	jɨj	•			•	•	i e (K, Ø)	i	費 phjɨj^{H}, hi, hi; 未 mjɨj^{H}, mi, bi 祈 gjɨj, gi/ge, ki; 氣/気 khjɨj^{H}, ke, ki; 毅 ŋjɨj^{H}, ge, gi; 衣 ʔjɨj^{(H)}, e, i
wiě	iue	jwe		•	•	•	•	wi>ui (T, S) wi>i		錘 ɖjwe, dwi>zui, twi>tui; 諈 ʈjwe^{H}, tui, tui; 羸 ljwe, rui, rui; 隨/随 zjwe, zui, sui 危 ŋjwe, gwi>gi, gwi>gi, (ki); 詭 kjwe^{X}, kwi>ki, kwi>ki; 為 ɣjwe, wi>i, wi>i
wiě	jue	jwie				•	•	wi>ui (T, S) wi>i		頍 khjwie, ki, ki; 規 kjwie, ki, ki; 恚 ʔjwie^{H}, i, i
wi	ui	wij		•	•	•	•	wi>ui (T, S) wi>i		類 lwjij^{H}, rui, rui; 榱 ʂwij, sui, sui 愧 kwij^{H}, kwi>ki, kwi>ki; 鮪 ɣwij^{X}, wi>i, wi>i
wi	jui	jwij			~	•	~	wi>ui (T, S) wi>i		緌 ɲjwij, ni, zui; 水 ɕjwij^{X}, swi>sui, swi>sui; 遺 yjwij, yui, wi>i 季 kjwij^{H}, ki, ki; 悸 gjwij^{H}, gi, ki
wěi	iuǝi	jwɨj				•	•	we>e wi>i (after MC ɣ)	wi>i	揮 xjwɨj, ke, ki; 魏 ŋjwɨj^{H}, gwe>ge, gwi>gi; 畏 ʔjwɨj^{H}, we>e, wi>i 謂 ɣjwɨj^{H}, wi>i, wi>i; 蝟 ɣjwɨj^{H}, wi>i, wi>i; 胃 ɣjwɨj^{H}, wi>i, wi>i

==== Rimes ending in a labial glide ====
The MC rimes ending in a labial glide were for the most part borrowed as diphthongs in Japanese. These later monophthongized as long vowels, such that these MC rimes mostly correspond to modern Japanese ō, yō, ū, or yū.

MC rime transcription			Occurs after					Japanese On readings		Examples
Karlgr.	Li	Baxter	P	T	S	K	Ø	Go	Kan	Middle Chinese, Go-on, Kan-on, (Kan'yō)
ɑu	ɑu	aw	•	•	•	•	•	au>ō		保 paw^{X}, hō, hō (ho); 島 taw^{X}, tau>tō, tau>tō; 灶 tsaw^{H}, sau>sō, sau>sō; 尻 khaw, kau>kō, kau>kō; 奧/奥 ʔaw^{H}, au>ō, au>ō
au	au	æw	•	•	•	•	•	eu>yō	au>ō	茅 mæw, meu>myō, bau>bō; 包 pæw, peu>hyō, pau>hō; 櫂 ɖæw^{H}, deu>zyō, tau>tō; 爪 tʂæw^{X}, seu>syō, sau>sō; 窖 kæw^{H}, kyō, kō; 巧 khæw^{H/X}, kyō, kau>kō; 坳 ʔæw, eu>yō, au>ō
i̯ɛu	iɛu	jew	•	•	•	•	•	eu>yō		表 pjew^{X}, peu>hyō, peu>hyō; 超 ʈhjew, teu>tyō, teu>tyō; 焦 tsjew, seu>syō, seu>syō; 僑 gjew, geu>gyō, keu>kyō; 妖 ʔjew, eu>yō, eu>yō; 曜 yjewH, yeu>eu>yō, yeu>eu>yō
i̯ɛu	jɛu	jiew	•			•	•	eu>yō		妙 mjiew^{H}, meu>myō, beu>byō; 翹 gjiew, geu>gyō, keu>kyō; 要 ʔjiew^{(H)}, yeu>eu>yō, yeu>eu>yō
ieu	eu	ew		•	•	•	•	eu>yō		料 lew^{H}, reu>ryō, reu>ryō; 嘯 sew^{H}, seu>syō, seu>syō; 梟 kew, keu>kyō, keu>kyō; 杳 ʔew^{X}, eu>yō, eu>yō
ə̆u	u	uw	•	•	•	•	•	u	ou>ō	剖 phuw^{X}, hu, hō, (bō); 豆 duw^{H}, du>zu, tō; 頭 duw, du>zu, tō; 走 tsuw^{X}, su, sō; 口 khuw^{X}, ku, kō; 狗 kuw^{X}, ku, kō; 侯 ɣuw, gu, kō; 區/区 ʔuw, u, ō
iə̆u	iu	juw	•	•	•	•	•	u iu>yū (T) yu (S)	ū (P) iu>yū	負 bjuw^{X}, bu, hū, (hu); 不 pjuw^{(X)}, hu, hū; 謀 mjuw, mu, bō 肘 ʈjuw^{X}, tyū, tyū; 宙 ɖjuw^{H}, diu>zyū, tiu>tyū; 晝/昼 ʈjuw^{H}, tiu>tyū, tiu>tyū; 柔 ɲjuw, niu>nyū, ziu>zyū 秀 sjuw^{H}, syu, syū; 囚 zjuw, zyu, siu>syū; 修 sjuw, syu, siu>syū 九, 久 kjuw^{X}, ku, kiu>kyū; 右, 有 ɣjuw^{X}, u, iu>yū; 又 ɣjuw^{H}, u, iu>yū; 憂 ʔjuw, u, iu>yū 由 juw, yu, iu>yū, (yui); 攸, 油 juw, yu, iu>yū; 悠 juw, iu>yū, iu>yū
i̯ĕu	iĕu	jiw	•			•	•	iu>yū		繆 mjiw, miu>myū, biu>byū; 彪 pjiw, piu>hyū, piu>hyū; 糾 kjiw^{X}, kiu>kyū, kiu>kyū; 幼 ʔjiw^{H}, iu>yū, iu>yū, (eu>yō)

==== Rimes with coda m ====
MC coda /m/ was originally written in Japanese with the man'yōgana 无, which came to stand for the nasal special mora /N/. The manyō'gana 无 developed into the hiragana ん used to represent /N/. It is possible that 无 originally represented two distinct sounds, moraic /m/ and moraic /n/ (from MC coda /n/, see below), but they may have been pronounced identically in Sino-Japanese vocabulary from the start. Regardless, 无 would not have stood for /mu/ in these words (the Go-on reading), just as the precursors of hiragana つ represented /t/ and not /tu/ when adapting the MC coda /t/ (see below). Native /mu/ from this time (man'yōgana 牟 or 武, among others) remains /mu/, developing to /N/ only under very specific circumstances, while the borrowed moraic /m/ always develops to /N/.

MC rime transcription			Occurs after					Japanese On readings		Examples
Karlgr.	Li	Baxter	P	T	S	K	Ø	Go	Kan	Middle Chinese, Go-on, Kan-on, (Kan'yō)
ɑm	ɑm	am		•	•	•	~	an		籃 lam, ran, ran; 三 sam^{(H)}, san, san; 慙/慚 dzam, zan, san; 甘 kam, kan, kan
ɑ̌m	ɒm	om		•	•	•	•	on	an	貪 thom, ton, tan, (don); 男, 南 nom, nan, dan; 慘/惨 tshom^{X}, son, san; 坎 khom^{X}, kon, kan; 含 ɣom, gon, kan, (gan); 暗 ʔom^{H}, on, an
i̯wæm	iuɐm	jom	•			~		on	an	凡 bjom, bon, han; 泛 phjom^{H}, hon, han
ə̆m	ɐm	ɛm		~	•	•	~	en	an	湛 ɖɛm^{X}, den, tan; 斬 tʂɛm^{X}, sen, san, (zan); 咸 ɣem, gen, kan
am	am	æm			•	•		en	an	芟 ʂæm, sen, san; 監 kæm^{(H)}, ken, kan; 銜 ɣæm, gen, kan
i̯ɛm	iɛm	jem	•	•	•	•	•	en		貶 pjem^{X}, hen, hen; 霑 ʈjem, ten, ten; 占 tɕjem^{(H)}, sen, sen; 僉/㑒 tshjem, sen, sen; 鹽/塩 jem^{H}, yen>en, yen>en; 拑 gjem, gen, ken; 奄 ʔjem^{X}, en, en
i̯ɛm	jɛm	jiem					•	en		猒 ʔjiem^{(H)}, en, en, (on); 厭 ʔjiem^{X/H}, en, en, (on)
iem	em	em		•	~	•		en		點/点 tem^{X}, ten, ten; 兼 kem^{(H)}, ken, ken
i̯æm	iɐm	jæm	~			•	~	on	en	嚴/厳 ŋjæm, gon, gen; 劍/剣 kjæm^{H}, kon, ken; 欠 khjæm^{H}, kon, ken
i̯ǝm	iǝm	im	•	•	•	•	•	in on (K, Ø)	in	稟 pim^{X}, hin, hin; 鱏 zim, zin, sin; 林 lim, rin, rin 今, 金 kim, kon, kin; 芩 gim, gon, kin; 音 ʔim, on, in
i̯ǝm	jǝm	jim			•		~	in	in	審 ɕjim^{X}, sin, sin; 鱏, 淫 yjim, in, in; 壬 ɲjim, nin, jin 淫 jim, in, in; 愔 ʔjim, in/an/on (unclassified On readings)

==== Rimes with coda n ====
MC coda /n/ was adapted in Japanese as the nasal special mora /N/.

MC rime transcription			Occurs after					Japanese On readings		Examples
Karlgr.	Li	Baxter	P	T	S	K	Ø	Go	Kan	Middle Chinese, Go-on, Kan-on, (Kan'yō)
ɑn	ɑn	an	•	•	•	•	•	an		半 pan^{H}, han, han; 伴 ban^{X/H}, ban, han; 單/単 tan, tan, tan; 旦 tan^{H}, tan/dan, tan; 散 san^{X/H}, san, san; 干 kan, kan, kan; 安 ʔan, an, an
an	an	æn	•		•	•	•	en	an	蠻/蛮 mæn, men, ban; 板 pæn^{X}, hen, han; 汕 ʂæn^{H}, sen, san; 姦 kæn, ken, kan; 妟 ʔæn^{H}, en, an
ə̆n	ɛn	ɛn	•	•	•	•	•	en	an	辦 bɛn^{H}, ben, han; 綻 ɖɛn, den, tan; 山 ʂɛn, sen, san; 間 kɛn, ken, kan; 柬 kɛn^{X}, ken, kan; 殷 ʔɛn, en, an
i̯ɛn	iɛn	jen	•	•	•	•	~	en		變/変 pjen^{H}, hen, hen; 展 ʈjen^{X}, ten, ten; 然 ɲjen, nen, zen; 線 sjen^{H}, sen, sen; 虔 gjen, gen, ken; 延 jen^{(H)}, yen>en, yen>en
i̯ɛn	jɛn	jien	•			•		en		便 bjien, ben, hen; 鞭 pjien, hen, hen; 面 mjien^{H}, men, ben; 遣 khjien^{X/H}, ken, ken
ien	en	en	•	•	•	•	•	en		片 phen^{H}, hen, hen; 殿 den^{H}/ten^{H}, den, ten; 欄 len^{H}, ren, ren; 霰 sen^{H}, sen, sen; 見 ken^{H}, ken, ken; 燕 ʔen^{(H)}, en, en
uɑn	uɑn	wan		•	•	•	•	an wan>an (K) wan (Ø)		短 twan^{X}, tan, tan; 亂/乱 lwan^{H}, ran, ran, (ron); 算 swan^{X}, san, san 官 kwan, kwan>kan, kwan>kan; 丸 ɣwan, gwan>gan, kwan>kan 碗 ʔwan^{X}, wan, wan
wan	uan	wæn			•	•	~	en wen>en (K)	an wan>an (K)	篡 tʂhwæn^{H}, sen, san; 孿 ʂwæn^{H}, sen, san 丱 kwæn^{H}, kwen>ken, kwan>kan; 患 ɣwæn^{H}, gen, kwan>kan
wə̆n	uɛn	wɛn				•		en wen>en (K)	an wan>an (K)	鰥 kwɛn^{(H)}, kwen>ken, kwan>kan; 幻 ɣwɛn^{H}, gwen>gen, kwan>kan
i̯æn	iɐn	jon	•			•	•	on	an en (K, Ø)	袢 bjon, bon, han; 萬/万 mjon^{H}, mon, ban (man) 言 ŋjon, gon, gen; 軒 xjon, kon, ken; 建 kjon^{H}, kon, ken; 鰋 ʔjon^{X}, on, en
i̯wɛn	iuɛn	jwen		•	•	•	•	en wen>en (K, Ø)		轉/転 ʈjwen^{H}, ten, ten; 宣 sjwen, sen, sen; 全 dzjwen, zen, sen; 軟 ɲjwen^{X}, nen, zen, (nan) 權/権 gjwen, gon, ken; 拳 gjwen, gwen>gen, kwen>ken; 巻 kjwen^{X}, ken, ken, (kwan>kan); 鉛, 沿,鳶 jwen, en, en
i̯wɛn	juɛn	jwien				•	•	en wen>en (K, Ø)		絹 kjwien^{H}, ken, ken; 悁 ʔjwien, en, en
iwen	uen	wen				•	•	en wen>en (K, Ø)		犬 khwen^{H}, kwen>ken, kwen>ken; 玄 ɣwen, gwen>gen, ken; 淵 ʔwen, wen>en, wen>en
ǝn	ǝn	on				•	•	on		根 kon, kon, kon; 痕 ɣon, gon, kon; 恩 ʔon, on, on
wǝn	uǝn	won	•	•	•	•	•	on won>on (Ø)		奔 pwon, hon, hon; 屯 dwon, don, ton; 寸 tshwon^{H}, sun, son; 存 dzwon, zon, son; 尊 tswon, son, son; 昆 kwon, kon, kon; 困 khwon^{H}, kon, kon 溫/温 ʔwon, won>on, won>on
i̯wæn	iuɐn	jwon				•	•	on won>on (Ø)	wen>en	券 khjwon^{X}, kon, kwen>ken; 元 ŋjwon, gon, gwen>gen 垣 ɣjwon, won>on, wen>en; 怨 ʔjwon^{(H)}, won>on, wen>en; 宛 ʔjwon^{X}, won>on, wen>en
i̯ɛn	iɛn	in	•	•	•	•	~	in on (K)	in	貧 bin, bin, hin; 鎮 ʈin^{(H)}, tin, tin; 粦 lin^{H}, rin, rin; 進 tsin^{H}, sin, sin 巾 kin, kon, kin; 誾 ŋin, gon, gin
i̯ēn	iēn	in	•	•	•	•	~	in on (K)	in	(same as above in Baxter's transcription)
i̯ēn	jēn	jin	•		•	•	•	in		賓 pjin^{(H)}, hin, hin; 人 ɲjin, nin, zin; 神 ʑjin, zin, sin; 臣 dʑjin, zin, sin; 引 jin^{X/H}, in, in; 緊 kjin^{X}, kin, kin; 因 ʔjin, in, in
i̯wēn	iuēn	win		•	•	•	•	in (after /r/) yun (T, S) on (K) win>in (Ø)	in (after /r/) yun (T, S) win>in (K, Ø)	倫, 輪, 淪, 綸, 侖 lwin, rin, rin 椿 ʈhwin, tyun, tyun; 旬 zwin, zyun, syun; 隼 swin^{X}, syun, syun 窘 gwin^{X}, gon, kwin>kin; 囷 khwin, kon, kin; 麕 kwin, kon, kwin>kin 殞 ɣwin^{X}, win>in, win>in; 頵 ʔwin/khwin, in/gin, in/kin
i̯uēn	iuēn	win		•	•	•	•	in (after /r/) yun (T, S) on (K) win>in (Ø)	in (after /r/) yun (T, S) win>in (K, Ø)	(same as above in Baxter's transcription)
i̯uēn	juēn	jwin			•	•	~	yun (S) win>in (K, Ø)		順 ʑjwin, zyun, syun; 準 ɕjwin^{X}, syun, syun (zyun); 潤 ɲjwin^{H}, nin, zyun 均 kjwin, kin, kin; 尹 jwin^{X}, win>in (unclassified On)
i̯ǝn	iǝn	jɨn				•	•	on	in	斤 kjɨn, kon, kin; 近 gjɨn^{X/H}, gon, kin; 隱/隠, ʔjɨn^{X}, on, in
i̯uǝn	iuǝn	jun	•			•	•	un, (on)	un	分 bjun^{H}, bun, fun; 墳, 憤 bjun^{X}, bun, hun; 文, 聞 mjun, mon, bun; 軍 kjun, kun, kun, (gun); 君 kjun, kun, kun; 慍 ʔjun^{H}, un, un (won>on)

==== Rimes with coda ŋ ====
MC coda /ŋ/ was borrowed as a single Japanese phoneme which was realized as two nasalized offglides: [ĩ] after /e/, and [ũ] after /u, o, a/. The nasality of these glides was generally not represented in writing, but in some cases was indicated with the same diacritic mark that would become the dakuten used to mark prenasalized obstruents. These glides then denasalized, and the resulting diphthongs later monophthongized as long vowels. As such, almost all characters with the MC coda /ŋ/ end in ō, yō, ē, ū, or yū in modern Japanese on'yomi.

MC rime transcription			Occurs after					Japanese On readings		Examples
Karlgr.	Li	Baxter	P	T	S	K	Ø	Go	Kan	Middle Chinese, Go-on, Kan-on, (Kan'yō)
ɑŋ	ɑŋ	aŋ	•	•	•	•	•	aũ>ō		謗 paŋ^{H}, hō, hō; 唐 daŋ, daũ>dō, taũ>tō; 倉 tshaŋ, saũ>sō, saũ>sō; 岡 kaŋ, kaũ>kō, kaũ>kō; 鴦 ʔaŋ, ō, ō
æŋ	ɐŋ	æŋ	•	•	•	•		yaũ>yō	aũ>ō	盲 mæŋ, myaũ>myō, maũ>mō; 烹 phæŋ, pyaũ>hyō, paũ>hō; 瞠 ʈhæŋ, tyō, tō; 笙 ʂæŋ, syō, sō 行 ɣæŋ^{(H)}, gyaũ>gyō, kaũ>kō; 坑, 更, 庚 khæŋ, kyaũ>kyō, kaũ>kō; 享 xæŋ, kaũ>kō, kyaũ>kyō
ɛŋ	ɛŋ	ɛŋ	•	•	•	•	•	yaũ>yō	aũ>ō	萌, 氓 mɛŋ, myaũ>myō, maũ>mō; 伻 pɛŋ, pyaũ>hyō, paũ>hō; 丁 ʈɛŋ, tyaũ>tyō, taũ>tō; 爭/争 tʂɛŋ, syaũ>syō, saũ>sō 莖/茎 ɣɛŋ, gyō, kō, (kē); 鶯/鴬, 鸚 ʔɛŋ, yaũ>yō, aũ>ō
ɔŋ	ɔŋ	æwŋ	•	•	•	•		oũ>ō	aũ>ō	邦 pæwŋ, poũ>hō, paũ>hō; 憧 ɖæwŋ^{H}, dō, taũ>tō; 雙/双 ʂæwŋ, soũ>sō, saũ>sō; 降 kæwŋ^{H}, koũ>kō, kaũ>kō; 江 kæwŋ, koũ>kō, kaũ>kō
ǝŋ	ǝŋ	oŋ	•	•	•	•		oũ>ō		朋 boŋ, boũ>bō, poũ>hō; 等 toŋ^{X}, toũ>tō, toũ>tō; 登 toŋ, toũ>tō, toũ>tō; 憎 tsoŋ, soũ>sō, soũ>sō, (zō); 僧 soŋ, soũ>sō, soũ>sō; 肯 khoŋ^{X}, koũ>kō, koũ>kō
wǝŋ	uǝŋ	woŋ				•		oũ>ō		肱 kwoŋ, kō, kō; 弘 ɣwoŋ, gu, kō
wɑŋ	uɑŋ	waŋ				•	•	waũ>ō		光 kwaŋ, kwaũ>kō, kwaũ>kō; 皇, 黃/黄 ɣwaŋ, waũ>ō, kwaũ>kō; 汪 ʔwaŋ, ō, ō
wæŋ	uɐŋ	wæŋ				•		waũ>ō		侊 kwæŋ, kō, kō; 橫/横, 蝗 ɣwæŋ^{(H)}, waũ>ō, kwaũ>kō
wɛŋ	uɛŋ	wɛŋ				•		waũ>ō		宏 ɣwɛŋ, waũ>ō, kwaũ>kō
i̯aŋ	iaŋ	jaŋ	•	•	•	•	•	aũ>ō (P, K, some S) yaũ>yō (T, S, Ø)	aũ>ō (P, some S) yaũ>yō	亡 mjaŋ, maũ>mō, baũ>bō; 妄, 望 mjaŋ^{H}, maũ>mō, baũ>bō; 訪 phjaŋ^{H}, paũ>hō, paũ>hō 丈 ɖjaŋ^{X}, dyaũ>zyō, tyaũ>tyō; 張 ʈjaŋ, tyō, tyō; 上 dʑjaŋ^{H/X}, zyaũ>zyō, syaũ>syō; 尚 dʑjaŋ^{(H)}, zyaũ>zyō, syaũ>syō; 商 ɕjaŋ, syaũ>syō, syaũ>syō 裝/装 tʂjaŋ^{(H)}, syaũ>syō, saũ>sō; 霜 ʂjaŋ, syaũ>syō, saũ>sō 良 ljaŋ, raũ>rō, ryaũ>ryō; 象 zjaŋ^{X}, zaũ>zō, syaũ>syō; 相 sjaŋ^{(H)}, saũ>sō, syaũ>syō; 仰 ŋjaŋ^{X}, gaũ>gō, gyaũ>gyō, (kō); 強 gjaŋ, gaũ>gō, kyaũ>kyō 央 ʔjaŋ, ō/yō, yō; 怏 ʔjaŋ^{X/H}, yō (unclassified On); 陽, 揚, 瘍, 楊 yjaŋ, yaũ>yō, yaũ>yō
i̯waŋ	iuaŋ	jwaŋ				•	•	waũ>ō	wyaũ>yō (K) waũ>ō (Ø)	況 xjwaŋ^{H}, kwaũ>kō, kwyaũ>kyō; 狂 gjwaŋ^{(H)}, gō, kyō 王 ɣjwaŋ^{(H)}, waũ>ō, waũ>ō; 枉 ʔjwaŋ, ō, ō
i̯ǝŋ	iǝŋ	iŋ	•	•	•	•	•	yoũ>yō oũ>ō (Ø, some K)	yoũ>yō	冰/氷 piŋ, pyoũ>hyō, pyoũ>hyō; 懲 ɖiŋ, dyoũ>zyō, tyoũ>tyō; 陵 liŋ, ryoũ>ryō, ryoũ>ryō; 升 ɕiŋ, syoũ>syō, syoũ>syō; 蠅/蝿 jiŋ, yō, yō 興 xiŋ, kō, kyō; 矜 kiŋ, kyō, kyō; 鷹 ʔiŋ, ō, yō
i̯æŋ	iɐŋ	jæŋ	•		•	•	•	yaũ>yō	eĩ>ē	平 bjæŋ, byaũ>byō, peĩ>hē; 兵 pjæŋ, pyaũ>hyō, peĩ>hē; 命 mjæŋ^{H}, myaũ>myō, meĩ>mē; 丙 pjæŋ^{X}, pyaũ>hyō, peĩ>hē; 明 mjæŋ, myaũ>myō, meĩ>mē 生 ʂjæŋ/ʂæŋ, syaũ>syō, seĩ>sē; 京 kjæŋ, kyaũ>kyō, keĩ>kē; 競 gjæŋ^{H}, gyaũ>gyō, keĩ>kē, (kyaũ>kyō); 迎 ŋjæŋ^{(H)}, gyō, gē; 卿 khjæŋ, kyō, kē; 英 ʔjæŋ, yō, ē
i̯ɛŋ	iɛŋ	jeŋ		•	•		•	yaũ>yō	eĩ>ē	貞 ʈjeŋ, tyō, tē; 令 ljeŋ^{(H)}, ryaũ>ryō, reĩ>rē; 正 tɕjeŋ^{H}, syaũ>syō, seĩ>sē; 姓, 性 sjeŋ^{H}, syaũ>syō, seĩ>sē; 省 sjeŋ^{X}, syaũ>syō, seĩ>sē; 盈 jeŋ, yō, ē
i̯ɛŋ	jɛŋ	jieŋ	•			•	•	yaũ>yō	eĩ>ē	并 pjieŋ, pyaũ>hyō, pei>hē; 名 mjieŋ, myaũ>myō, meĩ>mē; 勁/𠡍 kjieŋ^{H}, kyō, kē; 嬰 ʔjieŋ, yō, ē
ieŋ	eŋ	eŋ	•	•	•	•		yaũ>yō	eĩ>ē	冥 meŋ, myaũ>myō, meĩ>mē; 丁 teŋ, tyaũ>tyō, teĩ>tē; 定 deŋ^{H}, dyaũ>zyō, teĩ>tē; 靈/霊 leŋ, ryaũ>ryō, reĩ>rē; 寧 neŋ, nyaũ>nyō, neĩ>nē 經/経 keŋ^{(H)}, kyaũ>kyō, keĩ>kē; 形 ɣeŋ, gyaũ>gyō, keĩ>kē
i̯wæŋ	iuɐŋ	jwæŋ				•	•	wyaũ>yō	weĩ>ē	兄 xjwæŋ, kwyaũ>kyaũ>kyō, kweĩ>keĩ>kē; 永 ɣjwæŋ, wyaũ>yaũ>yō, weĩ>eĩ>ē
i̯wɛŋ	iuɛŋ	jweŋ					•	wyaũ>yō	weĩ>ē	營/営 yjweŋ, yō, ē
i̯wɛŋ	juɛŋ	jwieŋ				•	•	wyaũ>yō	weĩ>ē	頃, 傾 khjwieŋ, kyō, kē; 煢 gjwieŋ, gyō, kē; 縈 ʔjwieŋ, yō, ē
iweŋ	ueŋ	weŋ				•	~	wyaũ>yō	weĩ>ē	冋 kweŋ, kyō, kē; 泂 ɣweŋ^{X}, gyō, kē
i̯wǝŋ	iuǝŋ	wiŋ								(no example in GSR)
uŋ	uŋ	uwŋ	•	•	•	•	•	u uũ>ū (T)	oũ>ō	蒙 muwŋ, mu, bō, (mō); 弄 luwŋ^{H}, ru, rō; 送 suwŋ^{H}, su, sō; 戇 xuwŋ^{H}, ku, kō; 工, 公 kuwŋ, ku, koũ>kō; 洪 ɣuwŋ, gu, kō; 甕/瓮 ʔuwŋ^{H}, u, ō 東 tuwŋ, tū, tō; 通 thuwŋ, tuũ>tū, toũ>tō; 同 duwŋ, duũ>zū, toũ>tō (dou>dō)
uoŋ	oŋ	owŋ		•	•			o oũ>ō (T)	oũ>ō	冬 towŋ, toũ>tō, toũ>tō; 統 thowŋ^{H}, tō, tō; 農 nowŋ, no/nō, dō 宗 tsowŋ, so, soũ>sō; 宋 sowŋ, so, sō
iuŋ	iuŋ	juwŋ	•	•	•	•	•	u, uũ>ū yuũ>yū (T) yu (some Ø)	(y)oũ>(y)ō (P) yuũ>yū	風 pjuwŋ^{(H)}, hu/hū, hō; 馮 bjuwŋ, bu/bū/byō, hō/hyō, (hū) 中 ʈjuwŋ, tyuũ>tyū, tyuũ>tyū; 虫 ɖjuwŋ, dyuũ>zyū, tyuũ>tyū 嵩 sjuwŋ, sū, syū; 弓 kjuwŋ, ku/kū, kyuũ>kyū; 宮 kjuwŋ, ku, kyuũ>kyū; 熊 ɣjuwŋ, u, yū; 雄 ɣjuwŋ, u/yu, yū; 融 juwŋ, yu, yū
i̯woŋ	ioŋ	jowŋ	•	•	•	•	•	u, uũ>ū yuũ>yū (T) yo (some Ø)	oũ>ō (P) yoũ>yō	封 pjowŋ^{(H)}, hū, hō; 烽 phjowŋ, hu/hū, hō 重 ɖjowŋ^{(X)}, dyuũ>zyū, tyoũ>tyō; 龍/竜 ljowŋ, ryuũ>ryū, ryoũ>ryō 誦 zjowŋ^{H}, zu, syoũ>syō; 恐 khjowŋ^{X}, ku, kyoũ>kyō; 廾 kjowŋ^{X}, ku, kyoũ>kyō; 凶 xjowŋ, ku/kū, kyō; 勇, 踊, 蛹 jowŋ^{X}, yu/yuũ>yū, yoũ>yō; 用 jowŋ^{H}, yū, yō 雍 ʔjowŋ, yo, yō

==== Rimes with coda p ====
MC coda /p/ was borrowed as Japanese /pu/ (likely pronounced as [βu] after a vowel at the time of borrowing). Note that these original readings are identical to the readings for MC /m/-final rimes, but with ふ in place of ん. The phoneme /p/ eventually lenited to /h/ word-initially, but was lost between vowels (except Vpa > Vwa). The result was that all /pu/-final readings developed /Vu/ sequences, which later monophthongized. This same change is seen in native vocabulary, as in OJ ke_{1}pu > ModJ kyō 'today'. As a result of this development, all characters with the MC coda /p/ have Go and Kan readings ending in ō, yō or yū in modern Japanese.

Originally, borrowed coda /p/ functioned just like coda /t, k/ (see below) in that the "epenthetic" vowel /u/ did not appear before a voiceless obstruent /h~p, t, s, k/ in the same word, resulting in readings with the obstruent special mora /Q/ in place of /pu/. This phenomenon can still be seen in a number of Japanese words, for example 十 /zipu/ > /zyū/ 'ten' vs. 十歳 /ziQ.sai/ [dʑissai] 'ten years old' (now usually /zyuQ.sai/ [dʑɯssai]). For 拉 (MC lop), the expected Kan reading /rapu > rō/ is not found in Sino-Japanese vocabulary, but only /raQ/ as in 拉致 /raQ.ti/ [ɾattɕi] 'abduction' (shortened in most words to /ra/). However, for many characters, the vowel-final readings have been extended to all environments. In some cases, the reading with /Q/ led to the analogical creation of a /tu/-final reading. Notably, for 立 (MC lip) the Kan'yō-on reading /ritu/ (from regular /riQ/) is overwhelmingly common in Sino-Japanese vocabulary.

MC rime transcription			Occurs after					Japanese On readings		Examples
Karlgr.	Li	Baxter	P	T	S	K	Ø	Go	Kan	Middle Chinese, Go-on, Kan-on, (Kan'yō)
ɑp	ɑp	ap		•		•		apu>ō		臘 lap, rapu>rō, rapu>rō; 蹋 dap, dō, tō; 盍 ɣap, gapu>gō, kapu>kō; 榼 khap, kō, kō
ɑ̌p	ɒp	op		•	•	•	~	opu>ō	apu>ō	答 top, topu>tō, tapu>tō; 拉 lop, rō, rō, (ratu/ra); 内 nop, nopu>nō, dapu>dō; 雜/雑 dzop, zopu>zō, sapu>sō, (zapu>zō, zatu); 合 ɣop, gopu>gō, kapu>kō, (ka'/ga')
i̯wæp	iuɐp	jop	•					opu>ō	apu>ō	乏 bjop, bopu>bō, papu>hō; 法 pjop, popu>hō, papu>hō, (ha'/ho')
ə̆p	ɐp	ɛp			•	•		epu>yō	apu>ō	插/挿 tʂhɛp, sepu>syō, sapu>sō; 夾 kɛp, kepu>kyō, kapu>kō
ap	ap	æp			~	•	•	epu>yō	apu>ō	翣 ʂæp, syō, sō (unclassified On); 甲 kæp, kepu>kyō, kapu>kō, (kan); 押 ʔæp, epu>yō, apu>ō
i̯ɛp	iɛp	jep		•	•	~	•	epu>yō		巤/鼡 ljep, repu>ryō, repu>ryō; 聶 ɳjep, nepu>nyō, depu>zyō; 妾 tshjep, sepu>syō, sepu>syō; 葉 yjep, epu>yō, epu>yō
i̯ɛp	jɛp	jiep					•	epu>yō		厭 ʔjiep, epu>yō, epu>yō
iep	ep	ep		•	•	•		epu>yō		帖 thep, tepu>tyō, tepu>tyō; 浹 tsep, sepu>syō, sepu>syō; 莢 kep, kepu>kyō, kepu>kyō
i̯æp	iɐp	jæp				•		opu>ō	epu>yō	業 ŋjæp, gopu>gō, gepu>gyō; 脅 xjæp, kō, kyō
i̯ǝp	iǝp	ip		•	•	•	•	ipu>yū opu>ō (K, Ø)	ipu>yū	蟄 ɖip, dipu>zyū, tipu>tyū; 習 zip, zipu>zyū, sipu>syū; 立 lip, ripu>ryū, ripu>ryū, (ritu) 給 kip, kopu>kō, kipu>kyū; 邑 ʔip, opu>ō, ipu>yū / apu>ō
i̯ǝp	jǝp	jip			•		•	ipu>yū	ipu>yū	拾, 十 dʑjip, zipu>zyū, sipu>syū, (zi'); 執 tɕjip, sipu>syū, sipu>syū, (situ); 入 ɲjip, nipu>nyū, zipu>zyū, (ni'); 揖 ʔjip, ipu>yū, ipu>yū

==== Rimes with coda t ====
The MC coda /t/ was borrowed as Japanese /t/. Characters ending in this consonant were at first consistently pronounced with no epenthetic vowel, with the kana つ serving double duty to represent /t/ and /tu/. Note that these readings are identical to the readings for MC /n/-final rimes, but with つ/ち in place of ん. Later, an epenthetic vowel /u/ or /i/ was inserted after the consonant in most environments. Kan-on readings use /tu/ exclusively, while the earlier Go'on readings use both /ti/ and /tu/ unpredictably. For example, MC 跋 bat is adapted as Go /batu/, while the homophonous MC 犮 bat is listed in dictionaries as Go /bati/ (though it is not actually used in existing Japanese words). Often Go readings with /ti/ and /tu/ are listed for the same character, though in practice those with /tu/ are much more common. For example, 滅 has the Go readings /meti/ and /metu/, but only /metu/ is recognized as the jōyō reading, and this is the only Go reading found in existing Japanese words. In fact only nine characters have jōyō readings with /(C)Vti/, though these include the common characters 一 /iti/ 'one', 七 /siti/ 'seven', 八 /hati/ 'eight', and 日 /niti/ 'day'. Before a voiceless obstruent /h~p, t, s, k/ in the same word, the epenthetic vowel does not appear, and the /t/ functions as the obstruent special mora /Q/, forming a geminate with the following obstruent. For example, 日 /niti/ 'day' appears as /niQ/ in the word 日記 /niQ.ki/ [nikki] 'diary'.

MC rime transcription			Occurs after					Japanese On readings		Examples
Karlgr.	Li	Baxter	P	T	S	K	Ø	Go	Kan	Middle Chinese, Go-on, Kan-on, (Kan'yō)
ɑt	ɑt	at	•	•	~	•	•	ati/atu	atu	末 mat, matu, batu; 沫 mat, mati/matu, batu; 跋 bat, batu, hatu; 犮 bat, bati, hatu; 怛 tat, tati, tatu; 割 kat, kati, katu; 閼 ʔat, ati, atu
at	at	æt		•	•	•		eti/etu, (ati)	atu	哳 ʈæt, teti, tatu; 剎/刹 tʂhæt, seti, satu, (setu); 轄 ɣæt, geti, katu
ə̆t	ɛt	ɛt	•		•	•	•	eti/etu, (ati)	atu	八 pɛt, hati, hatu; 札 tʂɛt, setu, satu; 察 tʂhɛt, seti, satu; 劼 khɛt, keti, katu; 軋 ʔɛt, eti, atu
i̯ɛt	iɛt	jet	•	•	•	•		eti/etu	etu	別 bjet, beti, hetu, (betu); 撤 ʈhjet, teti, tetu; 列 ljet, reti, retu; 泄 sjet, seti, setu; 讞 ŋjet, geti, getu; 孑 kjet, keti, ketu
i̯ɛt	jɛt	jiet	•					eti/etu	etu	滅 mjiet, meti/metu, betu; 鱉 pjiet, heti, hetu
iet	et	et	•	•	•	•	•	eti/etu	etu	蔑 met, meti, betu; 姪 det, deti, tetu; 楔 set, seti, setu; 潔 ket, keti, ketu; 臬 ŋet, geti, getu; 噎 ʔet, eti, etu
uɑt	uɑt	wat		•	•	•	•	ati/atu wati>ati (K) wati (Ø)	atu watu>atu (K) watu (Ø)	奪 dwat, datu, tatu; 撮 tshwat, sati, satu 括, 檜 kwat, kwati>kati, kwatu>katu; 越 ɣwat, gwati>gati, kwatu>katu 斡 ʔwat, wati, watu
wat	uat	wæt		•	•	•	~	eti weti>eti (K, Ø)	atu watu>atu (K) watu (Ø)	錣 ʈwæt, teti, tatu; 刷 ʂwæt, seti, satu 刮 kwæt, keti, katu; 滑 ɣwæt, geti, katu 婠 ʔwæt, watu (unclassified On)
wə̆t	uɛt	wɛt			~	•	~	eti weti>eti (K, Ø)	atu watu>atu (K) watu (Ø)	滑 ɣwɛt, geti, katu; 猾 ɣwɛt, gweti>geti, kwatu>katu; 茁 tʂwɛt, seti/satu (unclassified On)
i̯æt	iɐt	jot	•			•	•	oti/otu	atu etu (K, Ø)	發/発 pjot, hoti/hotu, hatu; 伐 bjot, boti, hatu (batu); 韈 mjot, moti, batu, (betu) 歇 xjot, koti, ketu; 謁 ʔjot, oti, etu
i̯wɛt	iuɛt	jwet		•	•		~	eti/etu weti>eti (K)	etu wetu>etu (K, Ø)	綴 ʈjwet, teti, tetu; 埒 ljwet, reti, retu; 絶 dzjwet, zeti/zetu, setu 噦 ʔjwot/ʔjwet, woti>oti, wetu>etu; 悅/悦, 閱/閲 jwet, eti, etu
i̯wɛt	juɛt	jwiet				•		eti/etu weti>eti (K)	etu wetu>etu (K, Ø)	烕 xjwiet, keti, ketu; 缺/欠 khwet/khjwiet, kweti>keti, kwetu>ketu
iwet	uet	wet				•	~	eti/etu weti>eti (K)	etu wetu>etu (K, Ø)	決 kwet/xwet, kweti>keti, kwetu>ketu; 穴 ɣwet, gweti>getu, kwetu>ketu
ǝt	ǝt	ot				•		oti/otu	otu	齕 ɣot, goti, kotu (only example in GSR)
wǝt	uǝt	wot	•	•	•	•		oti/otu	otu	没 mwot, motu, botu; 突 dwot, doti, totu; 訥 nwot, noti, dotu; 卒 tshwot, soti, sotu; 骨 kwot, koti, kotu
i̯wæt	iuɐt	jwot				•	•	oti, (watu>atu) woti>oti (Ø)	wetu>etu	月 ŋjwot, goti/gwatu>gatu, gwetu>getu; 曰 ɣjwot, woti>oti, wetu>etu
i̯ɛt	iɛt	it	•	•	•	•	•	iti oti/otu (K, Ø)	itu	弼 bit, biti, hitu; 秩 ɖit, diti>ziti, titu; 慄 lit, riti, ritu; 七 tshit, siti, situ; 佾 jit, iti, itu 佶 git, goti, kitu; 乙 ʔit, oti/otu, itu
i̯ēt	iēt	it	•	•	•	•	•	iti oti/otu (K, Ø)	itu	(same as above in Baxter's transcription)
i̯ēt	jēt	jit	•		•	•	•	iti/itu	itu	必 pjit, hiti, hitu; 蜜 mjit, miti/mitu, bitu; 失 ɕjit, siti, situ; 質 tɕjit, siti, situ; 日 ɲjit, niti, zitu; 吉 kjit, kiti, kitu; 一 ʔjit, iti, itu; 逸 jit, iti, itu
i̯wēt	iuēt	wit		•	•	~		iti (after /r/) yuti/yutu (T, S) witi>iti (K, Ø)	itu (after /r/) yutu (T, S) witu>itu (K, Ø)	律, 率 lwit, riti, ritu 恤 swit, syuti, syutu; 黜 ʈhwit, tyuti, tyutu
i̯uēt	iuēt	wit		•	•	~		iti (after /r/) yuti/yutu (T, S) witi>iti (K, Ø)	itu (after /r/) yutu (T, S) witu>itu (K, Ø)	(same as above in Baxter's transcription)
i̯uēt	juēt	jwit			•	•	•	iti (after /r/) yuti/yutu (T, S) witi>iti (K, Ø)	itu (after /r/) yutu (T, S) witu>itu (K, Ø)	出 tɕhjwit, syuti, syutu; 述 ʑjwit, zyuti/zyutu, syutu 橘 kjwit, kiti, kitu; 遹, 鷸 jwit, iti, itu
i̯ǝt	iǝt	jɨt				•		oti	itu	乞 khjɨt, koti, kitu, (kotu); 汔 xjɨt, koti, kitu
i̯uǝt	iuǝt	jut	•			•	•	oti/otu (P) uti	utu	綍, 弗, 巿 pjut, hoti, hutu; 物 mjut, moti/motu, butu 屈 khjut, kuti, kutu; 鬱 ʔjut, uti, utu

==== Rimes with coda k ====
MC coda /k/ was borrowed as Japanese /k/ with a following epenthetic /i/ (after /e/) or /u/ (after /a, o, u/). After /i/, the epenthetic vowel (/iki/ vs. /iku/) depends on the original Middle Chinese vowel. The readings for MC /k/-final rimes are very similar to the original readings for MC /ŋ/-final rimes with く/き in place of nasalized う/い, but in this case there are some differences. Just like with coda /t/, the epenthetic vowel is absent before a voiceless obstruent /h~p, t, s, k/ in the same word, and the /k/ functions as the obstruent special mora /Q/. For example, 学 /gaku/ 'study' appears as /gaQ/ in the word 学校 /gaQ.kō/ [gakkō] 'school'.

MC rime transcription			Occurs after					Japanese On readings		Examples
Karlgr.	Li	Baxter	P	T	S	K	Ø	Go	Kan	Middle Chinese, Go-on, Kan-on, (Kan'yō)
ɑk	ɑk	ak	•	•	•	•	•	aku		博 pak, haku, haku; 幕 mak, maku, baku; 洛 lak, raku, raku; 索 sak, saku, saku; 作 tsak, saku, saku; 各 kak, kaku, kaku; 惡/悪 ʔak, aku, aku
æk	ɐk	æk	•	•	~	•	•	yaku	aku	百 pæk, hyaku, haku; 白 bæk, byaku, haku; 霸/覇 phæk, hyaku, haku; 乇 ʈæk, tyaku, taku; 笮 tʂæk, syaku, saku; 客 khæk, kyaku, kaku; 啞/唖 ʔæk, yaku, aku
ɛk	ɛk	ɛk	•	~	•	•	•	yaku	aku	脈 mɛk, myaku, baku; 册/冊 tʂhɛk, syaku, saku, (satu); 鬲 kɛk, kyaku, kaku; 扼 ʔɛk, yaku, aku
ɔk	ɔk	æwk	•	•	•	•	•	aku		藐 mæwk, maku, baku; 擢 ɖæwk, daku, taku, (teki); 卓 ʈæwk, taku, taku; 朔 ʂæwk, saku, saku; 角 kæwk, kaku, kaku; 學/学 ɣæwk, gaku, kaku; 握 ʔæwk, aku, aku
ǝk	ǝk	ok	•	•	•	•		oku		北 pok, hoku, hoku; 墨 mok, moku, boku; 得 tok, toku, toku; 塞 sok, soku, soku; 則 tsok, soku, soku; 克 khok, koku, koku
wǝk	uǝk	wok				•	~	oku waku (Ø)?		國/国 kwok, koku, koku 惑, 或 ɣwok, waku, koku
wɑk	uɑk	wak				•	•	waku>aku (K) waku (Ø)		郭 kwak, kwaku>kaku, kwaku>kaku; 穫 ɣwak, waku, kaku 雘 ʔwak, waku, waku, (kwaku>kaku)
wæk	uɐk	wæk				~	~	waku>aku?		砉 xwæk/xwek, kaku, kyaku; 虢 kwæk, kyaku/kaku (unclassified On)
wɛk	uɛk	wɛk				•	~	waku>aku, (oku?) waku (Ø)	waku>aku, (wyaku>yaku?)	膕 kwɛk, koku, kwaku>kaku; 馘 kwɛk, kwaku>kaku, kwyaku>kyaku 獲, 畫/画 ɣwɛk, waku, kwaku>kaku
i̯ak	iak	jak	•	•	•	•	•	aku yaku (T, Ø)	aku (P) yaku	縛 bjak, baku, haku 著 ɖjak, dyaku>zyaku, tyaku; 若 ɲjak, nyaku, zyaku 掠 ljak, raku, ryaku; 鵲 tshjak, saku, syaku; 却 khjak, kaku, kyaku 約 ʔjak, yaku, yaku; 躍, 龠 jak, yaku, yaku
i̯wak	iuak	jwak				•	~	waku>aku	wyaku>yaku waku (Ø)	矍 kjwak, kwaku>kaku, kwyaku>kyaku; 彠 ʔjwak/ʔjwæk, waku (unclassified On)
i̯ǝk	iǝk	ik	•	•	•	•	•	iki yoku (after /n/)? oku (K, Ø, some S)	yoku	楅 pik, hiki, hyoku; 直 ɖik, diki>ziki, tyoku; 力 lik, riki, ryoku; 卽/即 tsik, soku, syoku; 色 ʂik, siki, syoku; 織 tɕik, siki, syoku; 式 ɕik, siki, syoku; 翼 jik, iki, yoku 匿 ɳik, nyoku, dyoku>zyoku 極 gik, goku, kyoku; 亟 khik, koku, kyoku; 棘 kik, koku, kyoku; 抑 ʔik, oku, yoku
i̯æk	iɐk	jæk	•	~		•		yaku	eki	碧 pjæk, hyaku, heki; 辵 ʈhjæk, tyaku (unclassified On); 逆 ŋjæk, gyaku, geki; 郤 khjæk, kyaku, keki
i̯ɛk	iɛk	jek		•	•		•	yaku	eki	擿 ɖjek, zyaku, teki; 夕 zjek, zyaku, seki; 昔 sjek, syaku, seki; 赤 tshjek/tɕhjek, syaku, seki; 驛/駅, 譯/訳 jek, yaku, eki
i̯ɛk	jɛk	jiek	•				•	yaku	eki	璧 pjiek, hyaku, heki; 益 ʔjiek, yaku, eki
iek	ek	ek	•	•	•	•		yaku	eki	冪 mek, myaku, beki; 嫡 tek, tyaku, teki; 錫 sek, syaku, seki; 鷁 ŋek, gyaku, geki
i̯wæk	iuɐk	jwæk						wyaku>yaku	weki>eki	(no example in GSR)
i̯wɛk	iuɛk	jwek					•	wyaku>yaku	weki>eki	役 yjwek, yaku, eki
i̯wɛk	juɛk	jwiek						wyaku>yaku	weki>eki	(no example in GSR)
iwek	uek	wek				•		wyaku>yaku	weki>eki	鶪/鵙 kwek, kyaku, kweki>keki; 闃 khwek, kyaku, keki
i̯wǝk	iuǝk	wik				•	•	oku wiki>iki (Ø)	(wyoku)>yoku	洫 xwik, koku, kwyoku>kyoku 域 ɣwik, wiki>iki, yoku
uk	uk	uwk	•	•	•	•	•	oku woku>oku (Ø)		木, 鶩 muwk, moku, boku; 卜 puwk, hoku, hoku; 讀/読, 瀆/涜 duwk, doku, toku; 禿 thuwk, toku, toku; 鹿 luwk, roku, roku; 速 suwk, soku, soku; 谷 kuwk, koku, koku 屋 ʔuwk, woku>oku, woku>oku
uok	ok	owk	~	•	~	•	•	oku woku>oku (Ø)		僕 bowk/buwk, boku, hoku; 毒 dowk, doku, toku; 告 kowk, koku, koku; 沃 ʔowk, oku, yoku
iuk	iuk	juwk	•	•	•	•	•	uku, oku iku (T) wiku>iku (K, Ø)	uku, oku (P) iku yuku (S) wiku>iku (K, Ø)	目, 牧 mjuwk, moku, boku; 福 pjuwk, huku, huku; 服 bjuwk, buku, huku 竹 ʈjuwk, tiku, tiku; 忸 ɳjuwk, niku, diku>ziku; 肉 ɲjuwk, niku, ziku; 六, 陸 ljuwk, roku, riku 宿, 鱐 sjuwk, suku, syuku; 縮, 謖, 肅/粛 ʂjuwk, suku, syuku; 蹴 tshjuwk, suku, syuku 菊 kjuwk, kiku, kiku; 囿 ɣjuwk, wiku>iku, wiku>iku; 郁 ʔjuwk, wiku>iku, wiku>iku; 育 juwk, iku, iku
i̯wok	iok	jowk		•	•	•	•	oku	yoku	綠/緑 ljowk, roku, ryoku; 趣 tshjowk, soku, syoku; 旭 xjowk, koku, kyoku; 玉, 獄 ŋjowk, goku, gyoku; 欲, 浴, 慾 jowk, yoku, yoku

== Shapes of borrowed Sino-Japanese roots ==
All MC roots were a single syllable, and due to the restrictions on possible MC syllable shapes, a limited set of readings (on'yomi) are possible for borrowed Sino-Japanese roots. Furthermore, due in large part to the many distinct MC sounds which were merged when borrowed into Japanese, some readings are extremely common across different kanji, while others are very rare. The below table gives the number of kanji with each possible jōyō on'yomi (not distinguishing between Go, Kan, Tō, and Kan'yō, and not including readings considered restricted or rare). A zero represents a reading which is attested in Sino-Japanese vocabulary, but uses a non-jōyō reading. Readings which are listed in dictionaries but which are merely hypothesized and do not appear in attested Japanese words are not considered.

Number of jōyō kanji with each possible jōyō on'yomi (Go, Kan, Tō, Kan'yō)
on'yomi example word	#	on'yomi example word	#	on'yomi example word	#	on'yomi example word	#	on'yomi example word	#	on'yomi example word	#	on'yomi example word	#	on'yomi example word	#
i 医 i	25	e 恵 e	3	a 唖 a	1	o 汚職 o.syoku	2	u 有 u	5	ya 冶 ya	3	yo 預金 yo.kin	5	yu 柚 yu	7
hi 比 hi	21			ha 派 -ha	5	ho 歩 -ho	6	hu 麩 hu	22						
ti 地 ti	12			ta 他 ta	4	to 都 to	12	tu 都合 tu.gō	1	tya 茶屋 tya.ya	1	tyo 著 tyo	2		
si 詩 si	50	se 世界 se.kai	2	sa 差 sa	11	so 祖 so	13	su 素 su	3	sya 舎 sya	13	syo 書 syo	9	syu 主 syu	13
ki 気 ki	39	ke 卦 ke	3	ka 火 ka	32	ko 戸 ko	21	ku 口 ku	7			kyo 居 kyo	9		
bi 美 bi	6			ba 罵声 ba.sē	3	bo 墓 bo	7	bu 武 bu	8						
				da 打開 da.kai	7	do 土 do	5								
zi 字 zi	20	ze 是 ze	1	za 座 -za	2			zu 図 zu	2	zya 蛇 zya	2	zyo 女 zyo	7	zyu 綬 zyu	7
gi 義 gi	11	ge 下 ge	3	ga 画 ga	8	go 語 go	12	gu 具 gu	3			gyo 御 gyo	3		
mi 味 mi	3			ma 魔法 ma.hō	4	mo 茂林 mo.rin	2	mu 無 mu	6						
ni 二 ni	3			na 那辺 na.hen	2							nyo 女人 nyo.nin	2		
ri 理 ri	9			ra 裸裎 ra.tē	3	ro 炉 ro	5	ru 流 ru	1			ryo 旅 ryo	4		
				wa 話 -wa	2										
ē 栄 ē	10	ō 王 ō	15			ai 愛 ai	4			yō 用 yō	22	yū 勇 yū	17	yui 遺 yui	1
hē 平 hē	13	hō 方 hō	24	hū 風 hū	2	hai 肺 hai	10			hyō 票 hyō	8				
tē 体 tē	24	tō 灯 tō	38	tū 通 tū	2	tai 態 tai	22	tui 追加 tui.ka	4	tyō 丁 tyō	27	tyū 中 tyū	14		
sē 聖 sē	33	sō 草 sō	38	sū 数 sū	3	sai 犀 sai	24	sui 水 sui	12	syō 小 syō	57	syū 週 syū	25		
kē 計 kē	31	kō 幸 kō	64	kū 空 kū	1	kai 回 kai	24			kyō 京 kyō	28	kyū 九 kyū	22		
bē 米国 bē.koku	1	bō 坊 bō	23			bai 貝 bai	8			byō 秒 byō	6	byū 謬説 byū.setu	0		
dē 泥土 dē.do	1	dō 堂 dō	11			dai 代 dai	5								
zē 税 zē	1	zō 象 zō	9			zai 材 zai	5	zui 髄 zui	2	zyō 城 zyō	21	zyū 十 zyū	12		
gē 芸 gē	3	gō 業 gō	9	gū 偶 gū	4	gai 害 gai	11			gyō 行 gyō	6	gyū 牛 gyū	1		
mē 名 mē	8	mō 毛 mō	7			mai 枚 -mai	6			myō 妙 myō	5				
nē 寧日 nē.zitu	1	nō 農 nō	6			nai 内 nai	1			nyō 尿 nyō	1	nyū 入力 nyū.ryoku	3		
rē 令 rē	12	rō 蝋 rō	10			rai 雷 rai	4	rui 類 rui	4	ryō 両 ryō	16	ryū 竜 ryū	7		
						wai 歪度 wai.do	1								
in 引 in	13	en 円 en	17	an 暗 an	3	on 音 on	5	un 運 un	2						
hin 品 hin	5	hen 変 hen	7	han 半 han	24	hon 本 hon	3	hun 分 hun	8						
tin 珍 tin	6	ten 天 ten	9	tan 短 tan	14	ton 遁辞 ton.zi	3								
sin 新 sin	29	sen 戦 sen	30	san 三 san	12	son 損 son	6	sun 寸 sun	1					syun 旬 syun	3
kin 金 kin	16	ken 剣 ken	32	kan 漢 kan	46	kon 魂 kon	13	kun 訓 kun	4						
bin 敏 bin	4	ben 弁 ben	3	ban 晩 ban	8	bon 盆 bon	2	bun 文 bun	3						
		den 伝 den	4	dan 男 dan	9	don 鈍 don	3								
zin 仁 zin	11	zen 全 zen	8	zan 残 zan	4	zon 存意 zon.i	1	zun 寸胴 zun.dō	0					zyun 順 zyun	11
gin 銀 gin	2	gen 言 gen	12	gan 丸 gan	10	gon 勤求 gon.gu	1	gun 軍 gun	3						
min 眠 min	2	men 面 men	4	man 万 man	4	mon 門 mon	5								
nin 人 nin	5	nen 年 nen	6	nan 南 nan	4										
rin 林 -rin	7	ren 連 ren	5	ran 乱 ran	6	ron 論 ron	1								
				wan 湾 wan	2										
itu 逸 itu	1	etu 悦 etu	4	atu 圧力 atu.ryoku	1	otu 乙 otu	utu 鬱 utu	1							
hitu 筆 hitu	4	hetu 丿乀 hetu.hotu	0	hatu 発 hatu	2	hotu 発願 hotu.gan	1	hutu 仏人 hutu.zin	2						
titu 帙 -titu	2	tetu 鉄 tetu	5	tatu 達人 tatu.zin	1	totu 凸 totu	2								
situ 室 situ	9	setu 節 setu	11	satu 札 satu	9	sotu 卒 sotu	2							syutu 出 syutu	1
kitu 橘 kitu	3	ketu 決 ketu	7	katu 活 katu	9	kotu 骨 kotu	2	kutu 窟院 kutu.in	3						
		betu 別 betu	2	batu 罰 batu	5	botu 没 botu	2	butu 仏 butu	2						
		detu 捏造 detu.zō (rare reading)	0	datu 脱 datu-	2										
zitu 実 zitu	2	zetu 舌炎 zetu.en	2	zatu 雑 zatu	1			zutu 術無し zutu.na.si (rare reading)	0					zyutu 述 zyutu	2
		getu 月 getu	1	gatu 歹偏 gatu.hen	1	gotu 兀然 gotu.zen (rare)	0								
mitu 密 mitu	2	metu 滅亡 metu.bō	1	matu 末 matu	2	motu 没薬 motu.yaku	1								
		netu 熱 netu	1	natu 捺印 natu.in	0										
ritu 律 ritu	4	retu 列 retu	4	ratu 辣腕 ratu.wan	1										
iti 一 iti	2	eti 越後 eti.go	0												
				hati 八 hati	2										
				(tati) 達 -tati (possibly native)	0										
siti 七 siti	2	seti 刹那 seti.na	0			soti 帥 soti	0								
kiti 吉 kiti	1	keti 血縁 keti.en	0	kati 褐 kati	0										
		beti 別 beti	0	bati 罰 bati	1										
				(dati) 達 -dati (possibly native)	0										
ziti 実 ziti (rare reading)	0							zuti 術無し zuti.na.si (rare reading)	0						
				gati 月 gati	0										
miti 蜜 miti (rare reading)	0					moti 勿論 moti.ron	0								
niti 日 niti	1	neti 熱 neti (rare reading)	0												
riti 律 riti	0			rati 埒 rati	0										
iku 育児 iku.zi	1			aku 悪 aku	2	oku 屋 oku	4			yaku 益 yaku	6	yoku 欲 yoku	6		
				haku 白 haku	9	hoku 北西 hoku.sē	1	huku 服 huku	9	hyaku 百 hyaku	1				
tiku 竹簡 tiku.kan	5			taku 宅 taku	7	toku 徳 toku	7			tyaku 着 tyaku	2	tyoku 直 tyoku	3		
		seku 齷齪 aku.seku	0	saku 作 saku	10	soku 束 soku	11			syaku 勺 syaku	5	syoku 食 syoku	10	syuku 宿 syuku	6
kiku 菊 kiku	1			kaku 角 kaku	18	koku 国 koku	8			kyaku 客 kyaku	3	kyoku 局 kyoku	3		
				baku 獏 baku	5	boku 僕 boku	7	buku 服 buku (archaic)	0	byaku 白毫 byaku.gō	1				
				daku 濁点 daku.ten	2	doku 毒 doku	3								
ziku 軸 ziku	1			zaku 石榴 zaku.ro	0	zoku 族 zoku	5			zyaku 弱 zyaku	3	zyoku 辱 zyoku	1	zyuku 塾 zyuku	2
				gaku 学 gaku	5	goku 極 goku	2			gyaku 逆 gyaku	2	gyoku 玉 gyoku	1		
				maku 幕	2	moku 木 moku	3			myaku 脈 myaku	1				
niku 肉 niku	1									nyaku 蒟蒻 kon.nyaku	0				
riku 陸 riku	1			raku 陸 raku	4	roku 六 roku	3			ryaku 略 ryaku	1	ryoku 力役 ryoku.eki	2		
				waku 惑 waku	1										
iki 域 iki	1	eki 役 eki	6												
hiki 疋 -hiki	0	heki 癖 heki	3												
		teki 敵 teki	6												
siki 式 siki	4	seki 席 seki	16												
		keki 砉然 keki.zen	0												
		beki 冪 beki	0												
		deki 溺愛 deki.ai	1												
ziki 直 ziki	1														
		geki 劇 geki	4												
riki 力 riki	1	reki 鬲 reki	2												

Due to the fact that most MC syllables had a coda, most Japanese on'yomi are bimoraic, containing either two syllables, a long vowel, or the moraic nasal /N/. These last two structures are extremely common in Sino-Japanese roots, but long vowels are rare in native Japanese vocabulary. For these and other reasons, the phonological patterns of Sino-Japanese words and native Japanese words are markedly different, and it is very often possible to correctly guess the etymological origin of a word based solely on its shape.

== Phonetic correspondences between Modern Chinese and on'yomi ==
=== Comparison with Mandarin ===
At first glance, the on'yomi of many Sino-Japanese words do not resemble the Modern Standard Chinese pronunciations at all. Firstly, the borrowings occurred in three main waves, with the resulting sounds identified as Go-on (呉音), Kan-on (漢音), and Tō-on (唐音); these were at different periods over several centuries, from different stages in Historical Chinese phonology, and thus source pronunciations differ substantially depending on time and place. Beyond this, there are two main reasons for the divergence between Modern Standard Chinese and Modern Standard Japanese pronunciations of cognate terms:

1. Most Sino-Japanese words were borrowed in the 5th–9th centuries AD, from Early Middle Chinese into Old Japanese. Both languages have changed significantly since then, and in different ways. This has resulted in the respective pronunciations becoming more and more divergent over time.
2. Middle Chinese had a much more complex syllable structure than Old Japanese, as well as many more vowel and consonant differences. Many sounds and sound combinations had to be approximated in the borrowing process, sometimes with significant differences (e.g. final /ŋ/ was represented as /u/ or /i/).

Nonetheless, the correspondences between the two are fairly regular. As a result, Sino-Japanese can be viewed as a (transformed) "snapshot" of an archaic period of the Chinese language, and as a result is very important for comparative linguists as it provides a large amount of evidence for the reconstruction of Middle Chinese.

The following is a rough guide to equivalencies between modern Chinese words and modern Sino-Japanese on'yomi readings.

Unless otherwise noted, in the list below, sounds shown in quotation marks or italics indicate the usage of non-IPA romanization such as Hanyu pinyin for Mandarin Chinese and Hepburn romanization for Japanese. Symbols shown within slashes or square brackets, like /ɡ/ or [dʒ], are IPA transcriptions.

1. A major sound-shift has occurred in Mandarin since the time of modern contact with the West. Namely, the sounds written in Pinyin as "g" [k] or "k" [kʰ], when immediately preceding an "i", "y" or "ü" sound, became "j" ([tɕ], similar to English "j") or "q" ([tɕʰ], similar to English "ch"). This change is called palatalization. As a result, Peking (北京) changed to Běijīng, and Chungking (重慶) to Chóngqìng. This shift did not occur in Sino-Japanese. Thus, Mandarin qì (氣, 'breath, air, spirit') corresponds to Japanese ki. In some other varieties of Chinese, it is still pronounced as 'ki'. For example, 氣 in Southern Min is khì (Pe̍h-ōe-jī romanization). This is similar to the way the Latin ⟨C⟩, once always pronounced like an English ⟨K⟩, became closer to an English ⟨CH⟩ in Italian words where the ⟨C⟩ is followed by an ⟨E⟩ or ⟨I⟩, changing centum /kentum/ into cento /tʃento/.
2. Old Japanese did not have an "-ng" or [ŋ] syllable ending, which is very common in Chinese. This sound was borrowed as either /i/ or /u/. The combinations /au/ and /eu/ later became "ō" and "yō", respectively, in Japanese. Thus, the Mandarin reading of "Tokyo" (東京; Eastern (東) Capital (京)) is Dōngjīng; this corresponds to Japanese Tōkyō, with sound history for 京 being supposed approximately *kiæŋ -> kyau -> kyō (for comparison: Southern Min 京 (colloquial) is kiaⁿ with a nasal diphthong). Another example is 京城, former name for Seoul, which is Keijō in Japanese and Gyeongseong in Korean (which did and does have syllables ending in [ŋ]). 京 is read "kei" (*kiæŋ -> kyei -> kei) in this case.
3. As in the case of 京, the same character sometimes has multiple readings, e.g. "kyō" (Go-on) vs. "kei" (Kan-on) vs. "kin" (Tō-on). These stem from multiple phases of borrowing, which occurred at different times and from different source dialects and were carried out by different groups of people possibly speaking different dialects of Japanese. This means that the same word may have had different Chinese pronunciations, and even if not, the borrowers may have chosen different strategies to handle unfamiliar sounds. For example, the character 京 seems to have had an approximate pronunciation of /kjæŋ/ at the time of both the Go-on (5th–6th century AD) and Kan-on (7th–9th century AD) borrowings; however, the unfamiliar vowel /æ/ was represented by /a/ in the former case and /e/ in the latter. (This may also indicate different source pronunciations of the vowel.) In addition, the unfamiliar final /ŋ/ was represented by /u/ in the former case but /i/ in the latter, agreeing in frontness vs. backness with the main vowel. By the time of the Tō-on borrowing (post-10th century), the pronunciation in Chinese had changed to /kiŋ/, thus the pronunciation "kin" was decided as the closest approximation.
4. The vowels of Chinese sometimes correspond to Sino-Japanese in an apparently haphazard fashion. However, Mandarin "ao" often corresponds to Japanese "ō" (usually derived from earlier Sino-Japanese [au]), and Chinese empty rime [ɨ] (represented in pinyin with a "i") often corresponds to [i] (a different sound, also represented with a "i" in Hepburn) in Japanese.
5. The distinction between voiced and unvoiced consonants ([d] vs. [t] or [b] vs. [p]) has been lost in modern Mandarin and many other varieties of Chinese. The key exception is in Wu dialects (呉語, e.g. Shanghainese). The Shanghainese voiced consonants match the Japanese go-on (呉音) readings nearly perfectly in terms of voicing. For example, 葡萄 (grape) is pronounced "budo" in Shanghainese and "budō" (< "budau") in Japanese (preserving the voiced consonants [b] and [d]), but "pútáo" in Mandarin. Incidentally, the rising tone of the Mandarin syllables may reflect the earlier voiced quality of the initial consonants.
6. In modern Mandarin, all syllables end either in a vowel or in one of a small number of consonant sounds: "n", "ng", or occasionally "r". However, Middle Chinese, like several modern Chinese dialects (e.g. Yue, Hakka, Min), allowed several other final consonants including [p], [t], [k], and [m], and these are preserved in Sino-Japanese (except for -m, which is replaced by -n, as in 三, san, "three"). However, because Japanese phonology does not allow these consonants to appear at the end of a syllable either, they are usually followed in Sino-Japanese by an additional "i" or "u" vowel, resulting in a second syllable (-tsu or -chi if from -t, -ku or -ki if from -k, and -pu if from -p, although -pu became -fu and then simply -u). As a result, a one-syllable word in Chinese can become two syllables in Sino-Japanese. For example, Mandarin tiě (铁, 'iron') corresponds to Japanese tetsu (鉄). This is still pronounced with a final [t] in Cantonese: /tʰiːt˧/ (Vietnamese thiết). Another example is Mandarin guó (國, 'land'), from Early Middle Chinese /kwək/, corresponding to Japanese koku.
7. The consonant "f" in Mandarin corresponds to both "h" and "b" in Japanese. Early Middle Chinese had no /f/, but instead had /pj/ or /bj/ (in other reconstructions, /pɥ/ or /bɥ/). Japanese still reflects this ("h" was /p/ in Old Japanese). For example, Mandarin Fó (佛 'Buddha') corresponds to Japanese butsu (仏); both reflect Early Middle Chinese /bjut/ from a still older form /but/. In modern Southern Min Chinese, this character may be pronounced either [put] or [hut] (colloquial and literary respectively).
8. In addition, as in the previous example, Old Japanese /p/ became modern "h". When a Middle Chinese word ended in /p/, this produced further complications in Japanese. For example, Middle Chinese /dʑip/ 'ten' (Standard Mandarin "shí", Cantonese /sɐp/) was borrowed as Old Japanese /zipu/. In time this went through a series of changes: /zipu/ > /zihu/ > /ziu/ > /zjuː/ > "jū". Note that in some compounds, the word was directly borrowed as /zip-/ > "jip-"; hence "jippun" 'ten minutes' (or "juppun", influenced by "jū"), rather than "*jūfun".
9. More complex is the archaic dento-labial nasal sound: The character 武 ('strife, martial arts') was pronounced "mvu" in Late Middle Chinese. The sound is approximated in the Japanese pronunciations "bu" and "mu". However, that sound no longer exists in most modern Chinese dialects, except Southern Min "bú", and the character 武 is pronounced "wǔ" in Mandarin, /mou˩˧/ in Cantonese, "vu" in Hakka, Shanghainese, and Vietnamese.
10. The modern Mandarin initial "r" usually corresponds to "ny" or "ni" in Japanese. At the time of borrowing, characters such as 人 ('person') and 日 ('day'), which have an initial "r" sound in modern Mandarin, began with a palatal nasal consonant [ɲ] closely approximating French and Italian gn and Spanish ñ. (This distinction is still preserved in some Chinese varieties, such as Hakka and Shanghainese, as well as Vietnamese.) Thus Mandarin Rìběn (日本, Japan) corresponds to Japanese Nippon. This is also why the character 人, pronounced /ɲin/ in Middle Chinese, is pronounced "nin" in some contexts, as in ningen (人間), and "jin" in others, such as gaijin (外人)— approximating its more modern pronunciation. In Wu dialects, including Shanghainese, 人 ('person') and 二 ('two') are still pronounced "nin" and "ni", respectively. In Southern Min (especially Zhangzhou accent), 人 is "jîn" (literary pronunciation) which is practically identical to Japanese On'yomi.
11. In Middle Chinese, 五 ('five') and similar characters were pronounced with a velar nasal consonant, "ng" ([ŋ]), as its initial. This is no longer true in modern Mandarin, but it remains the case in other Chinese dialects such as Cantonese (/ŋ̩˩˧/) and Shanghainese. Japanese approximates the Middle Chinese */ng/ with "g" or "go"; thus 五 becomes "go". In Southern Min, it is pronounced /gɔ/ (colloquial) or /ŋɔ/ (literary) while in the Fuzhou dialect it is pronounced "ngu". In addition, some Japanese dialects have [ŋ] for medial g.
12. The Mandarin "hu" sound (as in "huá" or "huī") does not exist in Japanese and is usually omitted, whereas the Mandarin "l" sound becomes "r" in Japanese. Thus, Mandarin Huángbò (黄檗) corresponds to Japanese Ōbaku, and Rúlái (如来) and lamian (拉麵) to Nyorai and ramen respectively.
13. Mandarin "h", usually from Middle Chinese [x] or [ɣ] will often correspond to "k" or "g" in Japanese, as Old Japanese lacked velar fricatives: Modern Japanese [h] is derived from Old Japanese [ɸ], which descended in most cases from a Proto-Japonic */p/; however, this lack of velar fricatives in Old Japanese helps preserve the voiced-voiceless contrast between Middle Chinese [x] and [ɣ] that Mandarin, Cantonese, Korean and Vietnamese has lost. Mandarin "z" will often correspond to Japanese "j"; these are also changes in Chinese. Thus, Mandarin hànzì (漢字) corresponds to Japanese kanji, hànwén (漢文, Chinese written language) to kanbun, and zuìhòu (最後 'last') to saigo.

=== Chart of correspondences ===
Note:

- MC: Middle Chinese
- Pinyin: Modern Standard Chinese (Mandarin) in its official spelling. Multiple outcomes for MC initials (e.g. MC /ɡ/ > Pinyin g, j, k, q) are primarily due to two reasons:
  - MC voiced stops/affricates become Mandarin aspirated stops/affricates (p, t, k, etc.) when the syllable had the MC first tone (Mandarin first/second tones), unaspirated stops/affricates (b, d, g, etc.) otherwise.
  - Early Mandarin velar obstruents (g, k, h) and alveolar sibilants (z, c, s) become palatal obstruents (j, q, x) when a front vowel or glide followed.
- Go: Go-on (呉音), from the Northern and Southern dynasties China or Baekje Korea during the 5th and 6th centuries. Go means Wu.
- Kan: Kan-on (漢音), from the Tang dynasty during the 7th to 9th century.
- Tō-on (唐音): Zen Buddhist borrowings from the Song dynasty (10th to 13th century) and after.

Initials:

Place		Phonation
Place		Voiceless		Voiced
Place		Unaspirated	Aspirated	Obstruent	Sonorant
Labial (bilabial · labiodental)	MC	幫・非 [p] · [f]	滂・敷 [pʰ] · [fʰ]	並・奉 [b̥] · [v̥]	明・微 [m] · [ṽ]
Labial (bilabial · labiodental)	Pinyin	b · f	p · f	b, p · f	m · w
Labial (bilabial · labiodental)	Wu	p · f	ph · f	b · v	m · v
Labial (bilabial · labiodental)	Go	[p] → [ɸ] → [h]		[b]	[m]
Labial (bilabial · labiodental)	Kan	[p] → [ɸ] → [h]			[b] ([m] when the Tang source had coda [ŋ])
Coronal stop (alveolar · retroflex)	MC	端・知 [t] · [ʈ]	透・徹 [tʰ] · [ʈʰ]	定・澄 [d̥] · [ɖ̥]	泥・娘 [n] · [ɳ]
Coronal stop (alveolar · retroflex)	Pinyin	d · zh	t · ch	d, t · zh, ch	n · n
Coronal stop (alveolar · retroflex)	Wu	t · c	th · ch	d · j	n, ny · n, ny
Coronal stop (alveolar · retroflex)	Go	[t]		[d]	[n]
Coronal stop (alveolar · retroflex)	Kan	[t]			[d, z] ([n] when the Tang source had coda [ŋ])
Lateral	MC				来 [l]
Lateral	Pinyin				l
Lateral	Wu				l
Lateral	Go				[ɽ]
Lateral	Kan				[ɽ]
Coronal sibilant (alveolar · palatal, retroflex) (affricate / fricative)	MC	精・照 [ts] · [tɕ, tʂ]	清・穿 [tsʰ] · [tɕʰ, tʂʰ]	従・牀 [d̥z̥] · [d̥ʑ̊, d̥ʐ̊]
Coronal sibilant (alveolar · palatal, retroflex) (affricate / fricative)	MC	心・審 [s] · [ɕ, ʂ]		邪・禅 [z̥] · [ʑ̊, ʐ̊]
Coronal sibilant (alveolar · palatal, retroflex) (affricate / fricative)	Pinyin	z, j · zh	c, q · ch	z, j, c, q · zh, ch
Coronal sibilant (alveolar · palatal, retroflex) (affricate / fricative)	Pinyin	s, x · sh		s, x · sh
Coronal sibilant (alveolar · palatal, retroflex) (affricate / fricative)	Wu	ts · c	tsh · ch	dz · dzh
Coronal sibilant (alveolar · palatal, retroflex) (affricate / fricative)	Wu	s · sh		z · zh
Coronal sibilant (alveolar · palatal, retroflex) (affricate / fricative)	Go	[s]		[z]
Coronal sibilant (alveolar · palatal, retroflex) (affricate / fricative)	Kan	[s]
Palatal nasal	MC				日 [ɲ]
Palatal nasal	Pinyin				r
Palatal nasal	Wu				ny
Palatal nasal	Go				[n]
Palatal nasal	Kan				[z]
Velar stop	MC	見 [k]	渓 [kʰ]	群 [ɡ̊]	疑 [ŋ]
Velar stop	Pinyin	g, j	k, q	g, j, k, q	w, y, ∅
Velar stop	Wu	k	kh	g	ng, n
Velar stop	Go	[k]		[ɡ]
Velar stop	Kan	[k]			[ɡ]
Glottal	MC	影 [ʔ]			喩 (null)
Glottal	Pinyin	(null), y, w			y, w
Glottal	Wu	∅			∅, gh
Glottal	Go	(null) or [j] or [w]			[j] or [w]
Glottal	Kan	(null) or [j] or [w]			[j] or [w]
Velar fricative	MC	暁 [x]		匣 [ɣ̊]
Velar fricative	Pinyin	h, x		h, x
Velar fricative	Wu	h		gh
Velar fricative	Go	[k]		[ɡ] or [w]
Velar fricative	Kan	[k]		[k]

Finals:

MC	Pinyin	Wu	Go	Kan	Tō-on	in some compounds
/m/	n	n, ∅	/ɴ/
/n/	n	n, ∅	/ɴ/
/ŋ/	ng	n	[ũ~ĩ] > /u, i/		/ɴ/	?? same as not in compound ??
/p/	(null)	ʔ	/pu/ > /ɸu/ > /u/			/Q/
/t/	(null)	ʔ	/ti/ [tɕi], /tu/ [tsu]	/tu/ [tsu]	??	/Q/
/k/	(null)	ʔ	after front vowel, /ki/; after back vowel, /ku/		??	/Q/

=== Examples ===
Notes:

- Middle Chinese, Mandarin Pinyin, Go-on, Kan-on: See above.
- Middle Chinese reconstruction is according to William H. Baxter. His phonetic notation is used, along with IPA when different. Syllables are tone 1 unless otherwise indicated. See An Etymological Dictionary of Common Chinese Characters for more info.

Character	Meaning	Middle Chinese	Wu	Mandarin Pinyin	Cantonese (Yue)	Go-on	Kan-on
一	one	ʔjit	ih	yī	jat^{1}	ichi < *iti	itsu < *itu
二	two	nyijH /ɲij³/	nyi	èr < */ʐr/ < */ʐi/	ji^{2}	ni	ji < *zi
三	three	sam	sae	sān	saam^{1}	san	san
四	four	sijH /sij³/	sy	sì	sei^{3}	shi < *si	shi < *si
五	five	nguX /ŋu²/	ng	wǔ	ng^{5}	go	go
六	six	ljuwk	loh	liù	luk^{6}	roku	riku
七	seven	tshit /tsʰit/	tshih	qī	cat^{1}	shichi < *siti	shitsu < *situ
八	eight	pɛt	pah	bā	baat^{3}	hachi < *pati	hatsu < *patu
九	nine	kjuwX /kjuw²/	kieu	jiǔ	gau^{2}	ku	kyū < *kiu
十	ten	dzyip /dʑip/	dzheh	shí	sap^{6}	jū < *zipu	shū < *sipu
北	north	pok	poh	běi	bak^{1}	hoku < *poku	hoku < *poku
西	west	sej	si	xī	sai^{1}	sai	sei
東	east	tuwng /tuwŋ/	ton	dōng	dung^{1}	tsu < *tu	tō < *tou
京	capital	kjæng /kjæŋ/	kin	jīng	ging^{1}	kyō < *kyau	kei
人	person	nyin /ɲin/	nyin	rén	jan^{4}	nin	jin < *zin
日	sun	nyit /ɲit/	nyih	rì	jat^{6}	nichi < *niti; ni	?? jitsu < *zitu
本	base, origin	pwonX /pwon²/	pen	běn	bun^{2}	?? hon < *pon	?? hon < *pon
上	up	dzyangX /dʑaŋ²/, dzyangH /dʑaŋ³/	dzhaon	shàng	soeng^{6}	jō < *zyau	shō < *syau
下	down	hæX /ɦæ²,ɣæ²/, hæH /ɦæ³,ɣæ³/	gho	xià	haa^{5}	ge	ka

== See also ==
- Sino-Xenic pronunciations
- List of Chinese–Japanese false friends
- Baxter's transcription for Middle Chinese
- Wasei-kango
- Wasei-eigo
- Sino-Korean vocabulary
- Sino-Vietnamese vocabulary
- Classical compounds in European languages
- Scientific terminology § Classical and non-vernacular terms and expressions
- International scientific vocabulary § Words with different meanings
