= Taihu Lake Plain (region) =

Region in Eastern China

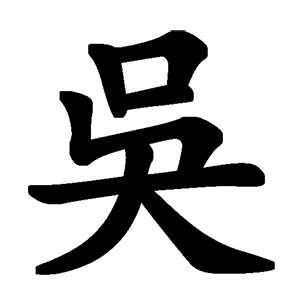
- “Wu” in regular script
- Chinese: 吳
- Literal meaning: Ideogrammic compound (會意): 口 (“mouth”) + 夨 (“man with tilted head”) – to speak loudly.
Transcriptions
Standard Mandarin
- Wade–Giles: wuu^{2}
Wu
- Suzhounese: Ńg
Hakka
- Romanization: ǹg

Wu (traditional Chinese: 吳; simplified Chinese: 吴; pinyin: Wú) refers to a region in China centered on Lake Tai in Jiangnan (the region south of the Yangtze River). The Wu region was historically part of the ancient Yang Province in southeastern China. The name "Wu" came from the names of several historical kingdoms based in that area.

== History ==
The first Wu state was established in the late Western Zhou dynasty. Once considered to be a vassal state of the Western Zhou dynasty, the Wu state emerged as a major power among the various states in China at the end of the Spring and Autumn period. The Wu state was a major power despite pressure from neighboring states. Wu was annexed by the Yue state in 473 BC. Yue itself was partitioned by Chu and Qi in 333 BC.

The Qin dynasty created the Kuaiji Commandery to consolidate control over the land of Wu captured from the state of Chu in 222 BC.

In the Han dynasty, the Wu region was initially a titular Tongxing kingdom ruled by the Prince of Wu. In 129AD, emperor Shun of Han established the Wu Commandery (Wudu, 吴郡), which was a commandery under the larger Yang Province (Yangzhou). Towards the end of the Han dynasty, most of Yangzhou was ruled by the warlord Sun Quan. Sun Quan's capital was initially in Wu County (around present-day Suzhou). Sun Quan the became the emperor of Eastern Wu. During the Three Kingdoms period, Eastern Wu emerged as the most influential one among the historical Wu kingdoms.

Wu remained a kingship title during the Eastern Jin dynasty. In 326, prince Sima Yue was enfeoffed as the King of Wu. In the Sui, Wu Commandery was abolished, and Wu Prefecture was renamed Suzhou. During Sui and Tang dynasties, the names changed several times between Wu and Su and eventually named Su Prefecture (present-day Suzhou) in the year 758.

There was two Wu Prefectures during the Southern and Northern Dynasties period. The Wu Prefecture of the Northern Dynasties was renamed Yang Prefecture (present-day Yangzhou) in the year 589, and around the same time Yang Prefecture was renamed Jiang Prefecture (present-day Nanjing).

In 907, the Yang dynasty re-established a state of Wu during the Five Dynasties and Ten Kingdoms period in modern-day Yangzhou which existed until 937. In modern-day Zhejiang, the Qian dynasty also established the state of Wuyue (907–978).

In 1363, during the late Yuan dynasty, Zhang Shicheng declared himself the King of Wu (吴王). In 1364, the founder of the Ming dynasty, Zhu Yuanzhang, also proclaimed himself the King of Wu.

== Notable cities ==
=== Meili ===
The state of Wu was founded by Taibo and Zhongyong, the first and second son of King Tai of Zhou. Meili (梅里) was the capital city. The vicinity is now known as Wuxi.

=== Suzhou ===
Suzhou was the capital of the Wu state during the Warring States period. Suzhou was also called Wuzhou.

The Wu language and its dialects are spoken in Wu region. The city of Suzhou is located in the core area of Wu region, and the dialect spoken in Suzhou is usually regarded as the most typical Wu language dialect.

=== Nanjing ===
The capital of the Eastern Wu state during the Three Kingdoms period was Nanjing, whose names include Jinling, Jianye and Jiankang.

In the Eastern Jin dynasty, Nanjing became the capital of China, for the first time the capital of the Chinese empire moved to southern China. The previous Chungyuan Standard Pronunciation (中原雅音) evolved into the Jinling Standard Pronunciation (金陵雅音) of standard Chinese. Go-on (吳音), which is one of the sources of Japanese pronunciation for Chinese characters (the others being kan-on, tō-on and kan'yō-on), was Jinling Standard Pronunciation, the standard Chinese of time that spread to Japan during Southern dynasties. The Go- component in the name Go-on is cognate to the Chinese word Wu (Wu is the pronunciation for the glyph 吳 in Mandarin. However, in today's Wu language 吳 is usually pronounced as Ho, Oh, Ng, or Nguu).

== See also ==
- Jiangnan
- Wu culture
- Wu languages
- Wu peoples
