= Oku =

Oku or OKU may refer to:

- Oku, Cameroon, subdivision in the Northwest Region of Cameroon
  - Lake Oku, a crater lake on the Bamenda Plateau in the Northwest Region of Cameroon
  - Mount Oku, the largest volcano in the Oku Massif, in the Cameroon Volcanic Line
- Oku language, a Grassfields Bantu language of Cameroon
- Oku people (Sierra Leone), an ethnic group of Yoruba descent in Sierra Leone.
- Ökü, a village in Azerbaijan
- Oku District, Okayama, a former district located in Okayama Prefecture, Japan
  - Oku, Okayama, a former town in the district, merged with other towns to create the city of Setouchi
- Oku (surname), a common Japanese surname
- Princess Ōku (661–702), a Japanese princess during the Asuka period in Japanese history
- OKU, IATA Airport Code for Mokuti Lodge Airport in Namibia
- Ogan Komering Ulu Regency, a province in South Sumatra, Indonesia
- Osaka Kyoiku University, a national university in Japan
- University of Oklahoma, abbreviated OU and, less commonly, OKU

== See also ==
- Oku Station (disambiguation), several train stations in Japan
