= Arvana =

- Municipality
- Location within Azerbaijan
- Coordinates: 38°49′42″N 48°07′13″E
- Country: Azerbaijan
- Rayon: Yardymli

Population
  - Total: 520
- Time zone: UTC+4 (AZT)

Arvana is a village and municipality in the Yardymli Rayon of Azerbaijan. It has a population of 520.

== Geography ==
The settlement is located near the Arvana River.

== Toponym ==
The "Caucasian Calendar" of 1856 gives the name of the village in the local language letters (ﺍﺮﻮﺍﻧه). In Russian pre-revolutionary literature, can be found the spelling "Arvane" or two spellings: "Arvan (Arvana)".

During the 19th and 20th centuries, Arvana belonged to the Russian Empire. The village belonged to the Sebidaj mahal of the Shamakhi province. Later, it was part of the Lankaran district of Baku province.

Along with other settlements (spelling preserved: "Kurakchi", "Mamulghan", "Mila" with the village of "Urakaran", "Peshtasar" with the village of "Asadabad" and "Uzu"), Arvana in the 1880s belonged to the Peshtasar rural community of Zuvand site of the above-mentioned district.

The mentioned settlements (Arvana, Abasabad, Kurakchi, Mamulghan, Mila, Peshtasar, Urakaran and Uzu) were part of the Peshtasar community at the beginning of the 20th century.

In 1930, the Vargaduz district was formed, which was later renamed Yardimli.

== Population ==
=== 19th century ===
According to the "Caucasian calendar" of 1856, Arvana of Sebidaj mahal was inhabited by "Tatars"-Shiites (Azerbaijani-Shiites), who spoke "Tatar" (Azerbaijani) among themselves.

According to the lists of populated areas of Baku province of 1870, compiled on the basis of information from the office description of the province from 1859 to 1864, there were 11 households and 87 residents (44 men and 43 women), who were "Tatars"-Shiites (Azerbaijani- Shiites). According to the information of 1873, published in the “Collection of Information about the Caucasus” edited by N.K.Seidlitz in 1879, the village already had 14 households and 91 residents (54 men and 37 women), consisting of “Tatars”-Shiites (Azerbaijani-Shiites).

From the materials extracted from the family lists for 1886, it is clear that all 116 residents of Arvana (56 men and 60 women; 12 dym) were “Tatars”, that is, Azerbaijanis (13 dym are indicated) and Shiites by religion, and peasants in terms of class.

=== 20th century ===
In the next "Caucasian calendar" of 1910 we read that in Arvan of the Zuvand district of the Lankaran district in 1908 there were 109 residents, mostly "Tatars" (Azerbaijanis). The same calendar also provides information about the village of "Arveran" (spelling preserved) of the same district, which in 1905 had 115 residents, also mostly "Tatars" (Azerbaijanis).

According to the publication “Administrative Division of the ASSR”, prepared in 1933 by the Department of National Economic Accounting of the Azerbaijan SSR (AzNEA), as of 1 January 1933, in Arvana were 50 households and 290 indigenous people (that is, registered in this village), including 148 men and 142 women. These same materials indicate that the entire Kurakchi village council of the Vargaduz district (Arvana, Avur, Kirevich, Kurakchi and Karauldash) in national terms was 100% “Turks” (Azerbaijanis).
