= Oku (surname) =

Oku (奥) is a common Japanese surname. Despite the apparent overlap with the modern go-on reading of oku that is derived from Middle Chinese, this term is actually rooted in Old Japanese, appearing in the Man'yōshū collection of poetry dating to roughly 759 CE. Cognate with 沖 (oki, "the open sea, offshore"), originally in reference to “somewhere far removed, possibly out of sight”. While oki came to mean “far removed in the wide open → far off shore”, oku instead came to mean “far removed inside → inside, interior”.

Notable people with this surname include:

- Daisuke Oku (奧 大介, 1976–2014), a Japanese football player who played for Japan national team.
- Hanako Oku (奥 華子, born 1978), a pop singer famous in her native Japan for her piano ballads
- Hiroya Oku (奥 浩哉, born 1967), a manga artist who is the creator of Gantz, Zero One and HEN
- Katsuhiko Oku (奥 克彦 1958–2003), a Japanese diplomat who played rugby for Oxford and Waseda University.
- Keiichi Oku (奥 慶一, born 1955), a Japanese keyboardist, composer, and arranger.
- Manami Oku (奥 真奈美, born 1995), a Japanese singer known for her work in the Japanese idol group AKB48.
- Shutaro Oku (奥秀太郎, born 1975), a Japanese film director and visual planner.
- Oku Yasukata (奥 保鞏, 1847 – 1930), Japanese field-marshal, commander of the Second Army of the Japan during the Russo-Japanese War

== See also ==
- Okechukwu Oku, also known as "The Oracle", a Nigerian movie producer, director, cinematographer and occasional musician.
- Princess Ōku (Japanese 大来皇女 or 大伯皇女) (661–702), a Japanese princess during the Asuka period in Japanese history.
- Oku (disambiguation)
