= Fındıqlıqışlaq =

Coordinates: 38°50′N 48°10′E

Fındıqlıqışlaq is a village in the municipality of Peştəsər in the Yardymli Rayon of Azerbaijan.
