= Gərsavan =

- Location within Azerbaijan
- Coordinates: 38°52′N 48°09′E
- Country: Azerbaijan
- Rayon: Yardymli
- Municipality: Kürəkçi
- Time zone: UTC+4 (AZT)
  - Summer (DST): UTC+5 (AZT)

Gərsavan (also, Gyarsavan) is a village in the Yardymli Rayon of Azerbaijan. The village forms part of the municipality of Kürəkçi.
