= Ökü =

- Location within Azerbaijan
- Coordinates: 38°54′10″N 48°11′23″E
- Country: Azerbaijan
- Rayon: Yardymli
- Municipality: Mamulğan
- Time zone: UTC+4 (AZT)

Ökü is a village in the Yardymli Rayon of Azerbaijan. The village forms part of the municipality of Mamulğan.

== Geography ==
The village is located near the Vilesh River.

== History ==
The village was part of the Russian Empire. It belonged to the Sebidaj mahal of Shamakhi province, which existed between 1846-1859, until it was renamed - the Baku province.

Oku was part of the Lankaran district of Baku province. In the 1880s, Oku, as well as "Auri", "Govran", "Yukhari Jarambal" with its village, "Pirembel (Khalfalar)" with its village and "Shilavanga" with its villages belonged to the Shilavanga rural community. Oku was part of this community at the beginning of the 20th century.

== Population ==
=== 19th century ===
According to the "Caucasian Calendar" of 1856, "Oku" of the Sebidaj mahal was inhabited by "Tatars"-Shiites (Azerbaijanis-Shiites), who spoke "Tatar" (Azerbaijani) among themselves.

According to the lists of populated areas of Baku province of 1870, compiled on the basis of information from the office description of the province between 1859-1864, there were 14 households and 152 residents (78 men and 74 women), who were "Tatars"-Shiites (Azerbaijanis-Shiites). According to 1873 data, published in the “Collection of Information about the Caucasus” edited by N. K. Seidlitz in 1879, the village already had 21 households and 195 residents (103 men and 92 women), also consisting of “Tatars”-Shiites (Azerbaijani-Shiites).

From the information available from the family lists of 1886, it is clear that all 217 residents of Oku (128 men and 89 women; 27 dym) were “Tatars” (Azerbaijanis) and Shiites by religion.

=== 20th century ===
According to the next "Caucasian Calendar" of 1910, in the village of Oku with a small settlement, related to the Zuvand site of the Lankaran district, there were 268 residents in 1908.

According to the data of the list of populated places related to Baku province and published by the Baku Provincial Statistical Committee in 1911, there were 266 residents in the village (150 men and 116 women; 32 dym), who were Shiites by religion. The "Caucasian Calendar" of 1912 also shows 266 residents in the village, listed as "Tatars" (Azerbaijanis).
