= Avun =

- Location within Azerbaijan
- Coordinates: 38°51′N 48°14′E
- Country: Azerbaijan
- Rayon: Yardymli
- Municipality: Urakəran
- Time zone: UTC+4 (AZT)
  - Summer (DST): UTC+5 (AZT)

Avun (also, Aun) is a village in the Yardymli Rayon of Azerbaijan. The village forms part of the municipality of Urakəran.
