= Oku Station =

Oku Station may refer to:

- Oku Station (Tokyo) - (尾久駅) A station connected with Tohoku Main Line and Takasaki Line, located in Tokyo.
- Oku Station (Okayama) - (邑久駅) A station connected with Ako Line, located in Okayama Prefecture.
