= On'yomi =

Kanji reading based on the original Chinese

On'yomi (Japanese: 音読み; [oɰ̃.jo.mi], lit. 'sound reading') or ondoku (音読; [on.do.kɯ]) is a way of homophonically reading kanji (Chinese characters) in Japanese. The on (音; [oɴ], lit. 'sounds') here are the approximated pronunciations, using Japanese consonants and vowels, of historical Chinese words. In contrast, the "readings" acquired from the translations of those same Chinese words into Japanese are known as kun'yomi.

A single kanji might have multiple on'yomi pronunciations, reflecting the Chinese pronunciations from different time periods or regions. On'yomi pronunciations are generally classified into go-on, kan-on, tō-on and kan'yō-on, roughly based on when they were borrowed from Chinese during the peaks of the Sinosphere.

Generally, on'yomi pronunciations are used for technical, compound words, which were mostly foreign loanwords from Ancient China; while the native kun'yomi pronunciation is used for singular, simpler words.

== Usage ==
On'yomi primarily occur in multi-kanji compound words (熟語, jukugo), many of which are the result of the adoption, along with the kanji themselves, of Chinese words for concepts that either did not exist in Japanese or could not be articulated as elegantly using native words. This borrowing process is often compared to the English borrowings from Latin, Greek, and Norman French, since Chinese-borrowed terms are often more specialized, or considered to sound more erudite or formal, than their native counterparts (occupying a higher linguistic register). The major exception to this rule is family names, in which the native kun'yomi are usually used (though on'yomi are found in many personal names, especially men's names).

Kanji invented in Japan (kokuji) would not normally be expected to have on'yomi, but there are exceptions, such as the character 働 ('to work'), which has the kun'yomi hatara(ku) and the on'yomi dō, and 腺 ('gland'), which has only the on'yomi sen—in both cases, these come from the on'yomi of the phonetic component, respectively dō (動) and sen (泉).

== Characteristics ==
In Chinese, most characters are associated with a single Chinese sound, though there are distinct literary and colloquial readings. However, some homographs (多音字) such as 行 (Mandarin: háng or xíng, Japanese: an, gō, gyō) have more than one reading in Chinese representing different meanings, which is reflected in the carryover to Japanese as well. Additionally, many Chinese syllables, especially those with an entering tone, did not fit the largely consonant-vowel (CV) phonotactics of classical Japanese. Thus most on'yomi are composed of two morae (beats), the second of which is either a lengthening of the vowel in the first mora (to ei, ō, or ū), the vowel i, or one of the syllables ku, ki, tsu, chi, fu (historically, later merged into ō and ū), or moraic n, chosen for their approximation to the final consonants of Middle Chinese. It may be that palatalized consonants before vowels other than i developed in Japanese as a result of Chinese borrowings, as they are virtually unknown in words of native Japanese origin, but are common in Chinese.

== Classification ==
Generally, on'yomi are classified into four types according to their region and time of origin:

- Go-on (呉音; 'Wu sound') readings derive from the Early Middle Chinese pronunciation used in the Northern and Southern dynasties of China during the 5th and 6th centuries, primarily from the Lower Yangtze Mandarin variety around the Southern Dynasties' capital Jiankang (today's Nanjing), which were immigrant northern speech (Mandarin) influenced by the local Wu dialects. These cover loanwords adopted when the Chinese writing system was first introduced (reputedly by the toraijin Wani) into Japan during the Kofun period.
- Kan-on (漢音; 'Han sound') readings come from the Late Middle Chinese pronunciation utilized during the Tang dynasty of China in the 7th to 9th centuries, primarily from the standard Central Plains Mandarin dialects of the imperial capital Chang'an (modern Xi'an), covering loanwords adopted during the Asuka and Nara period. Here, Kan refers to Han Chinese people or China proper, as in the similar word kanji (literally meaning 'Han character').
- Tō-on (唐音; 'Tang sound'), also known as Tōsō-on (唐宋音; Tang and Song sound), are readings based on the Old and Middle Mandarin pronunciations of later dynasties of China, such as the Song and Ming. These cover all readings adopted from the Heian era to the Edo period.
- Kan'yō-on (慣用音; 'customary sound') readings, which are mistaken or changed readings of the kanji that have become accepted into the Japanese language. In some cases, they are the actual readings that accompanied the character's introduction to Japan but do not match how the character "should" (is prescribed to) be read according to the rules of character construction and pronunciation.

The most common form of readings is the kan-on one, and use of a non-kan-on reading in a word where the kan-on reading is well known is a common cause of reading mistakes or difficulty, such as in ge-doku (解毒; 'detoxification', 'anti-poison') (go-on), where 解 is usually instead read as kai. The go-on readings are especially common in Buddhist terminology such as gokuraku (極楽; 'paradise'), as well as in some of the earliest loans, such as the Sino-Japanese numbers. The tō-on readings occur in some later words, such as isu (椅子; 'chair'), futon (布団; 'mattress'), and andon (行灯; a kind of paper lantern). The go-on, kan-on, and tō-on readings are generally cognate (with rare exceptions of homographs; see below), having a common origin in Old Chinese, and hence form linguistic doublets or triplets, but they can differ significantly from each other and from modern Chinese pronunciation.

== Ongana ==
Ongana (音仮名) are a type of Man'yōgana (kanji that are used phonemically and that predate modern kana) that make use of the kana's on'yomi. For example:

- shi (志) + ma (麻) → shima (志麻; kun'yomi of 島 'island')
- to (登) + ki (岐) → toki (登岐; kun'yomi of 時 'time')
- pi (比) + to (登) → pito → fito → hito (比登; kun'yomi of 人 'human; person')
- ya (也) + matsu (末) → yama (也末; kun'yomi of 山 'mountain')

== Examples ==
Examples (rare readings in parentheses)
| Kanji | Meaning | Go-on | Kan-on | Tō-on | Kan'yō-on | Middle Chinese |
|---|---|---|---|---|---|---|
| 明 | bright | myō | mei | (min) | — | mjang |
| 行 | go | gyō gō | kō kō | (an) | — | haengH |
| 極 | extreme | goku | kyoku | — | — | gik |
| 珠 | pearl | shu | shu | ju | (zu) | tsyu |
| 度 | degree | do | (to) | — | — | duH, dak |
| 輸 | transport | (shu) | (shu) | — | yu | syu |
| 雄 | masculine | — | — | — | yū | hjuwng |
| 熊 | bear | — | — | — | yū | hjuwng |
| 子 | child | shi | shi | su | — | tsiX |
| 清 | clear | shō | sei | (shin) | — | tshjeng |
| 京 | capital | kyō | kei | (kin) | — | kjaeng |
| 兵 | soldier | hyō | hei | — | — | pjaeng |
| 強 | strong | gō | kyō | — | — | gjangX |

== See also ==
- Kun'yomi
- Kanji
