= Go-on =

Japanese kanji pronunciation style

Go-on or goon (呉音; English: /ˈɡoʊ.ɒn/ GOH-on; Japanese pronunciation: [ɡo.oɴ] or [ɡoꜜoɴ], lit. "Wu sound") are an early layer of Japanese kanji readings (on'yomi), predating kan-on (漢音). Go-on was transmitted with Chinese classical and Buddhist texts and remains particularly common in Buddhist vocabulary. Both go-on and kan-on reflect Middle Chinese pronunciations, adapted to Japanese phonology.

== History and uses ==
Go-on is the earliest of the three main historical layers of Chinese-based kanji readings, followed by kan-on and tōsō-on.

A common account traces the transmission of go-on to people from Baekje who had contact with the Wu region of southern China during the Six Dynasties. Edwin G. Pulleyblank identifies the Wu of go-on with the old southern capital of Jiankang (modern Nanjing) and its surroundings, where he suggests an older Chinese pronunciation standard was particularly persistent. The Nihon Kokugo Daijiten also records a theory tracing its origins further back, through the Korean Peninsula, to Chinese pronunciations of the Han and Wei periods.

Routes followed by Japanese missions to Tang China, which brought kan-on readings to Japan.

Kan-on was introduced through missions to Tang China and other contacts during the Nara and early Heian periods. Go-on readings continued in use alongside it: 行 is read gyō in shugyō (修行; "Buddhist practice"), but kō in kyūkō (急行; "express train").

Compounds can also mix the two layers. In modern Japanese, for example, gengo (言語; "language") combines kan-on gen with go-on go. In a study of two historical dictionaries, Hideyuki Ohshima compared selected two-character Sino-Japanese word forms whose characters had distinct go-on and kan-on readings. Mixed readings accounted for about 15% of the forms in the 12th-century Iroha Jiruishō and about 24% in the Nippo Jisho, published in 1603–1604.

Some historical go-on readings were lost after kan-on was introduced. Sino-Japanese character dictionaries (kanwa jiten) nevertheless supply go-on readings for their entries, including artificial readings inferred from Chinese fanqie spellings. Marc Hideo Miyake also describes a dictionary that supplied some unattested go-on and kan-on readings by analogy with homophonous characters in the historical Chinese works Guangyun and Yunjing.

== Names ==
These readings were formerly called wa-on (和音; lit. "Japanese sound"). The name go-on is attested for this reading layer from the mid-Heian period, including in Fujiwara no Kintō's Hokuzanshō (北山抄, compiled c. 1012–1021). The Nihon Kokugo Daijiten suggests that this usage imitated a Chinese practice of contrasting southern go-on with kan-on, regarded as the correct pronunciation. It attributes the later theory of a southern Chinese origin to the association of the name with Wu.

== Characteristics ==
Go-on distinguishes voiced and voiceless consonants that are merged in kan-on. It also has initial m- and n- where kan-on has b- and d-, respectively: 馬 ("horse") has go-on ma and kan-on ba, while 男 ("man") has nan and dan.

Readings of selected characters
Kanji	Meaning	Go-on	Kan-on	Middle Chinese transcription
明	"bright"	myō	mei	mjaeng
京	"capital"	kyō	kei	kjaeng
上	"up"	jō	shō	dzyangX, dzyangH
下	"below"	ge	ka	haeX, haeH

In the Middle Chinese transcriptions, X marks the rising tone and H the departing tone.

== See also ==
- On'yomi: Sino-Japanese readings
  - Kan-on: a later type of reading
  - Tō-on: an even later type of reading
- Checked tone
