= Kan-on =

One of the sources of pronunciation of Japanese kanji

Kan-on or kan'on (漢音; Japanese pronunciation: [kaꜜɰ̃.oɴ] or [kaɰ̃.oɴ], "Han sound") are Japanese kanji readings borrowed from Chinese during the Tang dynasty, from the 7th to the 9th centuries; a period which corresponds to the Japanese Nara period. They were introduced by, among others, envoys from Japanese missions to Tang China. Kan-on should not be confused with tō-on (唐音, Tang sound), which were later phonetic loans.

Kan-on are on'yomi (音読み) based on the central Chang'an pronunciation of Middle Chinese. The syllable Kan is a reading of Middle Chinese: 漢 (xan^{H}) as per Japanese phonology, referring to the Han dynasty, which had Chang'an as its capital city. Furthermore, Kan (漢) has also become a description for all things Chinese, e.g., kanji ('Chinese characters').

Kan'on partly displaced the earlier go-on, which were "just imitations of Korean imitations, but Kan-on were imitations of the real thing."

A minority of characters never had their kan-on transmitted to Japan; their kan-on are sometimes reconstructed in Japanese dictionaries although not specifically marked as such. A few dictionaries go as far as to discard attested kan-on in favour of more systematic pronunciations.

== Characteristics as compared to go-on ==
=== In consonants ===
Type	unvoiced / voiced						voiced / nasal					zi- / ni-, zy- / ny-				
Kanji	神	大	土	地	分	仏	男	女	万	美	無	二 児	人 刃	日	如	若
Kan-on	sin	tai	to	ti	fun	futu	dan	dyo	ban	bi	bu	zi	zin	zitu	zyo	zyaku
Go-on	zin	dai	do	di	bun	butu	nan	nyo	man	mi	mu	ni	nin	niti	nyo	nyaku
Notes							d- / n-		b- / m-			Mandarin r-, er				

=== In vowels ===
Type	* / -e												-ei / -ai				* / -u							
Kanji	衣	気	戯	愛	解	会 絵	快 怪	外	仮 家	下 夏	化	花	西 斉	体 帝	米	礼	素	図	怒	公 口	豆 頭	右 有	九 久	留
Kan-on	i	ki	gi	ai	kai	kwai		gwai	ka		kwa		sei	tei	bei	rei	so	to	do	kou	tou	iu	kiu	riu
Go-on	e	ke	ge	e	ge	we	ke	ge	ke	ge	ke		sai	tai	mai	rai	su	du	nu	ku	du	u	ku	ru
Notes													Mandarin -i											

Type	-i- / -o-					-e- / -o-				-a- / -o-		-a- / -ya-			-yoku / -iki			
Examples	音 隠	今 金	品	乙	乞	遠 園	建	言 厳	越	叛	発	行	客	白	色 拭	食	直	力
Kan-on	in	kin	fin	itu	kitu	wen	ken	gen	wetu	fan	fatu	kau	kaku	faku	syoku		tyoku	ryoku
Go-on	on	kon	fon	otu	kotu	won	kon	gon	woti	fon	fotu	gyau	kyaku	byaku	siki	ziki	diki	riki
Notes																		

Type	-e- / -ya-														others			
Kanji	京 経	形	正 声	成 静	丁 挺	定	兵	平 病	名 命 明	霊	役	石 赤	寂	暦	牛	月	殺	文 聞
Kan-on	kei		sei		tei		fei		mei	rei	eki	seki		reki	giu	getu	satu	bun
Go-on	kyau	gyau	syau	zyau	tyau	dyau	fyau	byau	myau	ryau	yaku	syaku	zyaku	ryaku	gu	gwati	setu	mon
Notes	Mandarin -ing: zheng, cheng, sheng																	

Japanese vowels

== See also ==
- On'yomi: Sino-Japanese readings
  - Go-on: an earlier type of reading
  - Tō-on: a later type of reading
- Checked tone
