= Tō-on =

On'yomi originating from the from China after ca. 10th century

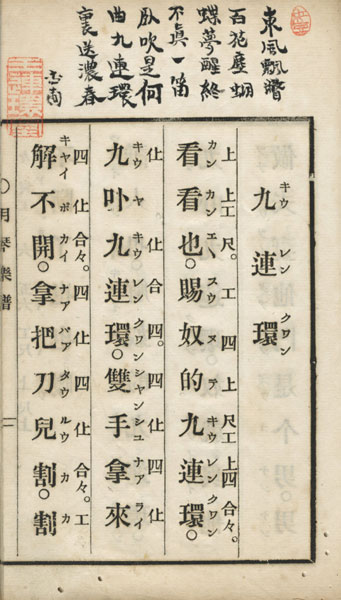
The lyrics of a song in the book, 清楽 (Gekkin Gakufu; 1877) annotated in tō-on pronunciation

Tō-on or tōon (唐音; English: /ˈtoʊ.ɒn/ TOH-on; Japanese pronunciation: [toꜜːoɴ], "Tang sound") are Japanese kanji readings imported from China by Zen monks and merchants during and after the Song dynasty, as a form of on'yomi (音読み). As with kan-on and go-on, the "tō" in "tō-on" does not denote the Tang dynasty but is a term meaning China itself.

== Overview ==
During the Muromachi period, tō-on was also called sō-on (宋音, lit. Song sound). Together, tō-on and sō-on are sometimes referred to as tō-sō-on (唐宋音). Unlike go-on and kan-on, which form systematic sets covering the entire character inventory, tō-on is fragmentary, consisting of pronunciations that entered alongside specific words. After the suspension of official missions to Tang China, Sino-Japanese exchange resumed in the late Heian and early Kamakura period and flourished through the Muromachi and Edo period. These readings were transmitted by Zen monks studying abroad and by merchants engaged in private trade. As a result, the Chinese sources of tō-on vary widely in both time and region.

Academically, tō-on is divided into medieval tō-on (also called sō-on by some scholars) and early modern tō-on.

- Medieval tō-on refers to pronunciations used in Kamakura-period Rinzai and Sōtō school for chanting Buddhist texts.
- Early modern tō-on refers to pronunciations used in the Edo period by the Ōbaku school and the Gion-ji branch of the Sōtō school for chanting Buddhist texts, as well as those learned by interpreters in Nagasaki and by scholars of Chinese learning.

In Genkai, among 13,546 Sino-Japanese words listed as collected vocabulary, only 96 are classified as tō-on words, indicating that the number of such words entering Japanese is extremely small. Tō-on words familiar to modern speakers are mostly based on medieval tō-on. However, identifying which everyday words are tō-on is often difficult, due to factors such as multiple possible kanji spellings, mere phonetic renderings, or hybrid forms mixed with go-on or kan-on readings.

== See also ==
- On'yomi: Sino-Japanese readings
  - Kan-on: an earlier type of reading
  - Go-on: an even earlier type of reading
