= Peştəsər =

- Municipality
- Location within Azerbaijan
- Coordinates: 38°51′00″N 48°10′32″E
- Country: Azerbaijan
- Rayon: Yardymli

Population
  - Total: 459
- Time zone: UTC+4 (AZT)

Peştəsər (also, Peştəsar and Peshtasar) is a village and municipality in the Yardymli Rayon of Azerbaijan. It has a population of 459. The municipality consists of the villages of Peştəsər and Fındıqlıqışlaq.

== Geography ==
The village is located near the Arvana River, on the slopes of Peshtasar Range.

== Toponym ==
In the “Caucasian Calendar” of 1856, the name of Peshtasar is given in the letters of the local language (ﭘﻮﺷﺘﻪﺴﺮ). In Russian pre-revolutionary literature, can be found the spellings “Pushtesar” or “Peshtasar”.

== History ==
During the 19th and early 20th centuries, Peshtasar was part of the Russian Empire. The village belonged to the Sebidaj mahal of the Shamakhi province. Later, it was part of Lankaran district of the Baku province.

In the 1880s, Peshtasar and a number of other settlements (the spelling has been preserved: "Arvana", "Mamulghan", "Mila" with the village of "Urakaran", "Kurakchi" and "Uzu") belonged to Peshtasar rural community of the Zuvand site of the before-mentioned district. Peshtasar was part of the Peshtasar community at the beginning of the 20th century as well.

In 1930, Vargaduz district was formed, which was later renamed Yardimli. In the early 1930s, Peshtasar and five other settlements (Chay Uzu, Asadabad, Nisagala, Urakaran and Uzu) belonged to Uzu village council of Vargaduz district.

== Population ==
=== 19th century ===
According to the "Caucasian Calendar" of 1856, the village of Peshtasar of the Sebidaj mahal was inhabited by "Tatars"-Shiites (Azerbaijanis-Shiites), who spoke "Tatar" (Azerbaijani) among themselves.

According to the lists of populated areas of Baku province of 1870, compiled on the basis of the information from the office description of the province from 1859 to 1864, there were 20 households and 325 residents (116 men and 109 women), who were "Tatars"-Shiites. According to the data of 1873, published in the “Collection of Information about the Caucasus” edited by N. K. Seidlitz in 1879, the village already had 31 households and 244 residents (150 men and 94 women), the population being recorded as “Tatars”-Shiites (Azerbaijanis-Shiites).

From the materials of the family lists of 1886, it is clear that all 381 residents of Peshtasar and the village of “Asadabad” (214 men and 167 women; 35 dym) were “Tatars”-Shiites (Azerbaijanis-Shiites), and in terms of class, peasants.

== 20th century ==
According to the List of Populated Places related to Baku Governorate and published by the Baku Governorate Statistical Committee in 1911, the village had 434 residents of Talysh nationality (245 men and 189 women; 62 dym), who were Shiites by religion.

According to the materials of the publication "Administrative Division of the ASSR", prepared in 1933 by the Department of National Economic Accounting of the Azerbaijan SSR (AzNEA), as of 1 January 1933, in Peshtasar were 120 households and 616 people of the indigenous population (that is, registered within this village), including 307 men and 309 women. These same materials indicate that the entire Uzu village council, to which Peshtasar belonged, was 100% “Turks” (Azerbaijanis) in terms of nationality.
