= Urakəran =

- Municipality
- Location within Azerbaijan
- Coordinates: 38°52′49″N 48°12′57″E
- Country: Azerbaijan
- Rayon: Yardymli

Population
  - Total: 962
- Time zone: UTC+4 (AZT)
  - Summer (DST): UTC+5 (AZT)

Urakəran (also, Uragaran and Urakeran) is a village and municipality in the Yardymli Rayon of Azerbaijan. It has a population of 962. The municipality consists of the villages of Urakəran and Avun.
