= Mamulğan =

Village and municipality in Yardymli Rayon, Azerbaijan

Coordinates: 38°54′N 48°11′E

Mamulğan is a village and municipality in the Yardymli Rayon of Azerbaijan. It has a population of 468.
