= Vladikavkazsky okrug =

Coordinates: 43°02′24″N 44°40′39″E

Vladikavkazsky okrug Владикавказскій округъ
- Okrug
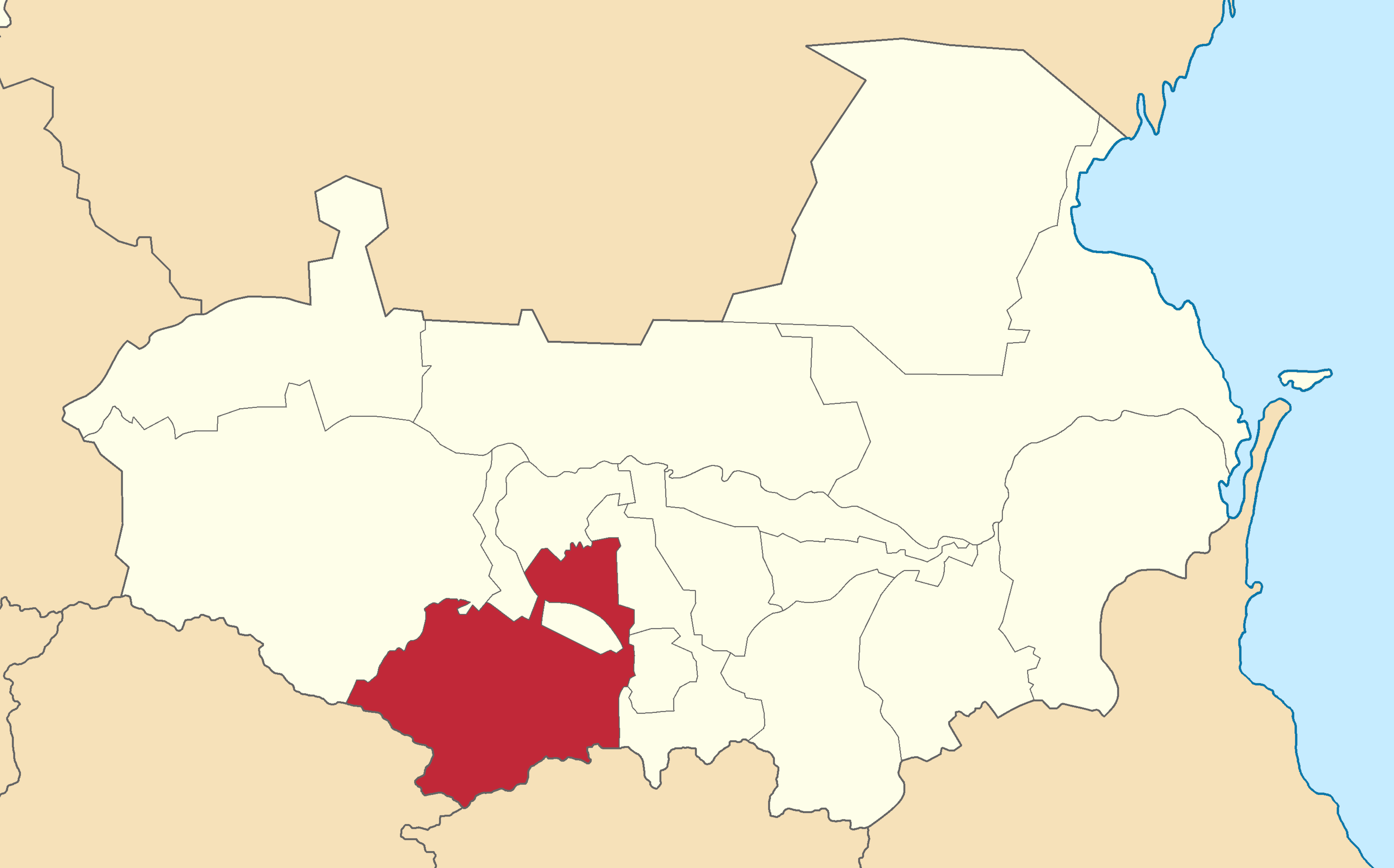
- Location in the Terek Oblast
- Country: Russian Empire
- Viceroyalty: Caucasus
- Oblast: Terek
- Established: 1870
- Abolished: 1920
- Capital: Vladikavkaz

Area
  - Total: 5,716.60 km^{2} (2,207.19 sq mi)

Population (1916)
  - Total: 207,742
  - Density: 36.3401/km^{2} (94.1205/sq mi)
  - Urban: 35.26%
  - Rural: 64.74%

The Vladikavkazsky okrug (Note: Russian: Владикавка́зский о́круг, pre-reform orthography: Владикавка́зскій о́кругъ, romanized: Vladikavkázsky ókrug) was a district (okrug) of the Terek Oblast of the Caucasus Viceroyalty of the Russian Empire. The area of the Vladikavkazsky okrug made up part of the North Caucasian Federal District of Russia. The district was eponymously named for its administrative centre, Vladikavkaz.

== Administrative divisions ==
The subcounties (uchastoks) of the Vladikavkazsky okrug were as follows:

Name	1912 population
1-y uchastok (1-й участокъ)	26,460
2-y uchastok (2-й участокъ)	25,632
3-y uchastok (3-й участокъ)	61,047

== Demographics ==
=== Russian Empire Census ===
According to the Russian Empire Census, the Vladikavkazsky okrug had a population of 134,947 on 28 January [O.S. 15 January] 1897, including 70,514 men and 64,433 women. The majority of the population indicated Ossetian to be their mother tongue, with a significant Russian speaking minority.

Linguistic composition of the Vladikavkazsky okrug in 1897
Language	Native speakers	%
Ossetian	88,265	65.41
Russian	31,205	23.12
Georgian	3,298	2.44
Armenian	2,093	1.55
German	1,673	1.24
Polish	1,511	1.12
Ukrainian	1,439	1.07
Jewish	1,059	0.78
Persian	822	0.61
Ingush	733	0.54
Imeretian	643	0.48
Greek	502	0.37
Tatar (Note: Before 1918, Azerbaijanis were generally known as "Tatars". This term, employed by the Russians, referred to Turkic-speaking Muslims of the South Caucasus. After 1918, with the establishment of the Azerbaijan Democratic Republic and "especially during the Soviet era", the Tatar group identified itself as "Azerbaijani".)	366	0.27
Lithuanian	213	0.16
Kumyk	160	0.12
Kazi-Kumukh	121	0.09
Kabardian	109	0.08
Chechen	93	0.07
Dargin	57	0.04
Romanian	55	0.04
Avar-Andean	50	0.04
Circassian	46	0.03
Belarusian	41	0.03
Bashkir	32	0.02
Nogai	6	0.00
Romani	3	0.00
Turkmen	3	0.00
Karachay	2	0.00
Kalmyk	1	0.00
Other	346	0.26
TOTAL	134,947	100.00

=== Kavkazskiy kalendar ===
According to the 1917 publication of Kavkazskiy kalendar, the Vladikavkazsky okrug had a population of 207,742 on 14 January [O.S. 1 January] 1916, including 106,645 men and 101,097 women, 160,280 of whom were the permanent population, and 47,462 were temporary residents:

Nationality	Urban		Rural		TOTAL	
Nationality	Number	%	Number	%	Number	%
North Caucasians	8,539	11.66	129,632	96.38	138,171	66.51
Russians	46,876	64.00	1,912	1.42	48,788	23.48
Armenians	8,326	11.37	60	0.04	8,386	4.04
Other Europeans	6,139	8.38	1,221	0.91	7,360	3.54
Shia Muslims (Note: Primarily Tatars.)	2,463	3.36	0	0.00	2,463	1.19
Georgians	0	0.00	1,674	1.24	1,674	0.81
Jews	798	1.09	0	0.00	798	0.38
Roma	102	0.14	0	0.00	102	0.05
TOTAL	73,243	100.00	134,499	100.00	207,742	100.00

== Bibliography ==
- Bournoutian, George A. (2018). Armenia and Imperial Decline: The Yerevan Province, 1900–1914. Milton Park, Abingdon, Oxon: Routledge. ISBN 978-1-351-06260-2. OCLC 1037283914.
- Hovannisian, Richard G. (1971). The Republic of Armenia. Vol. 1: The First Year, 1918–1919. Berkeley: University of California Press. ISBN 978-0520019843.
- Кавказский календарь на 1913 год [Caucasian calendar for 1913] (in Russian) (68th ed.). Tiflis: Tipografiya kantselyarii Ye.I.V. na Kavkaze, kazenny dom. 1913. Archived from the original on 19 April 2022.
- Кавказский календарь на 1917 год [Caucasian calendar for 1917] (in Russian) (72nd ed.). Tiflis: Tipografiya kantselyarii Ye.I.V. na Kavkaze, kazenny dom. 1917. Archived from the original on 4 November 2021.
- Tsutsiev, Arthur (2014). Atlas of the Ethno-Political History of the Caucasus (PDF). Translated by Nora Seligman Favorov. New Haven: Yale University Press. ISBN 9780300153088. Archived (PDF) from the original on 17 June 2023.
