= Khasavyurtovsky okrug =

Coordinates: 43°15′N 46°35′E

Khasavyurtovsky okrug Хасавюртовскій округъ
- Okrug
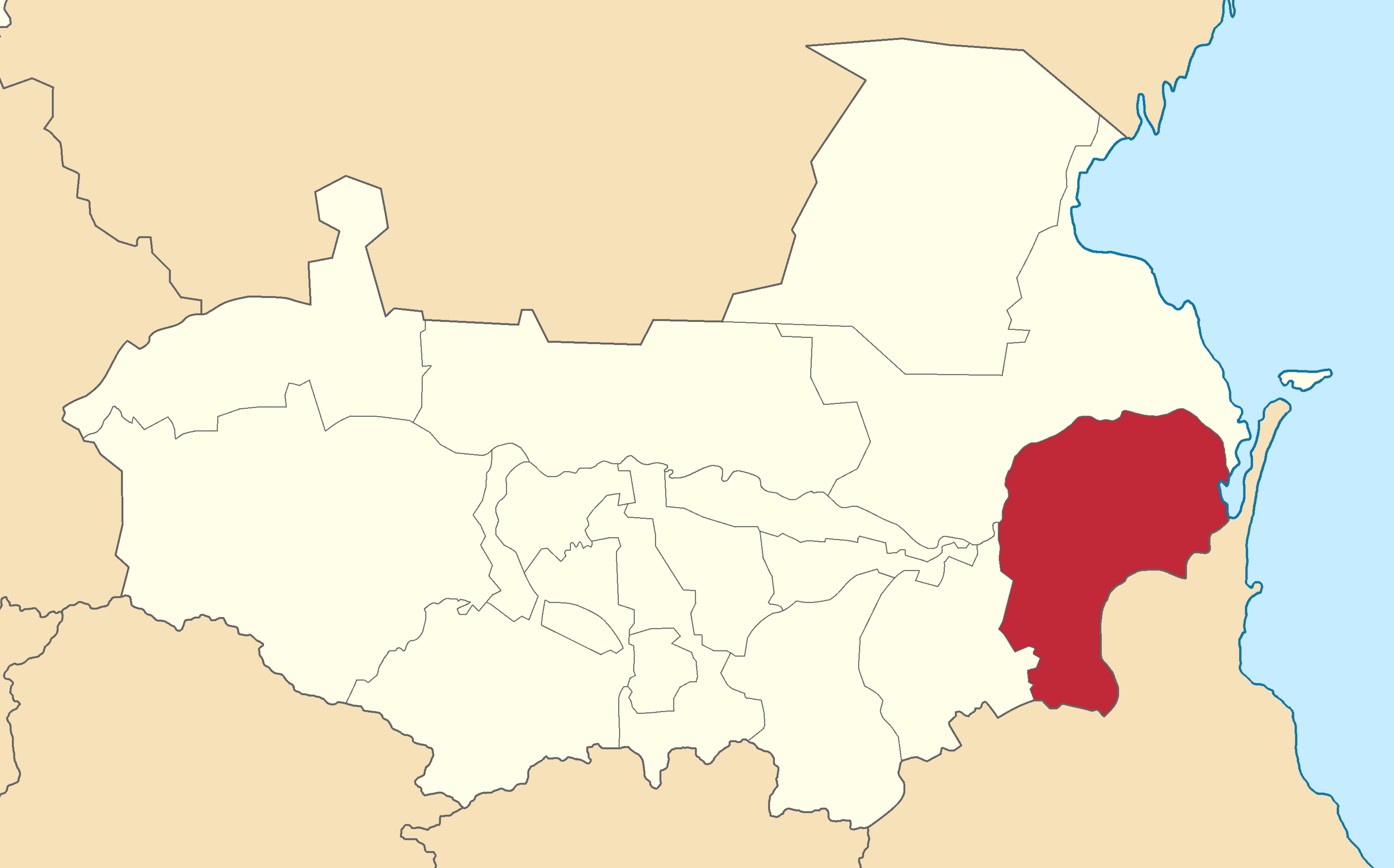
- Location in the Terek Oblast
- Country: Russian Empire
- Viceroyalty: Caucasus
- Oblast: Terek
- Established: 1869
- Abolished: 1928
- Capital: Khasavyurt

Area
  - Total: 5,348.05 km^{2} (2,064.89 sq mi)

Population (1916)
  - Total: 87,654
  - Density: 16.390/km^{2} (42.450/sq mi)
  - Rural: 100.00%

The Khasavyurtovsky okrug (Note: Russian: Хасавюрто́вскій о́кругъ, romanized: Khasavyurtóvsky ókrug; Chechen: Хаси-Эвлан гуо) was a district (okrug) of the Terek Oblast of the Caucasus Viceroyalty of the Russian Empire. The area of the Khasavyurtovsky okrug made up part of the North Caucasian Federal District of Russia. The district was eponymously named for its administrative centre, Khasavyurt.

== Administrative divisions ==
The subcounties (uchastoks) of the Khasavyurtovsky okrug were as follows:

Name	1912 population
1-y uchastok (1-й участокъ)	23,148
2-y uchastok (2-й участокъ)	20,368
3-y uchastok (3-й участокъ)	22,355

== History ==
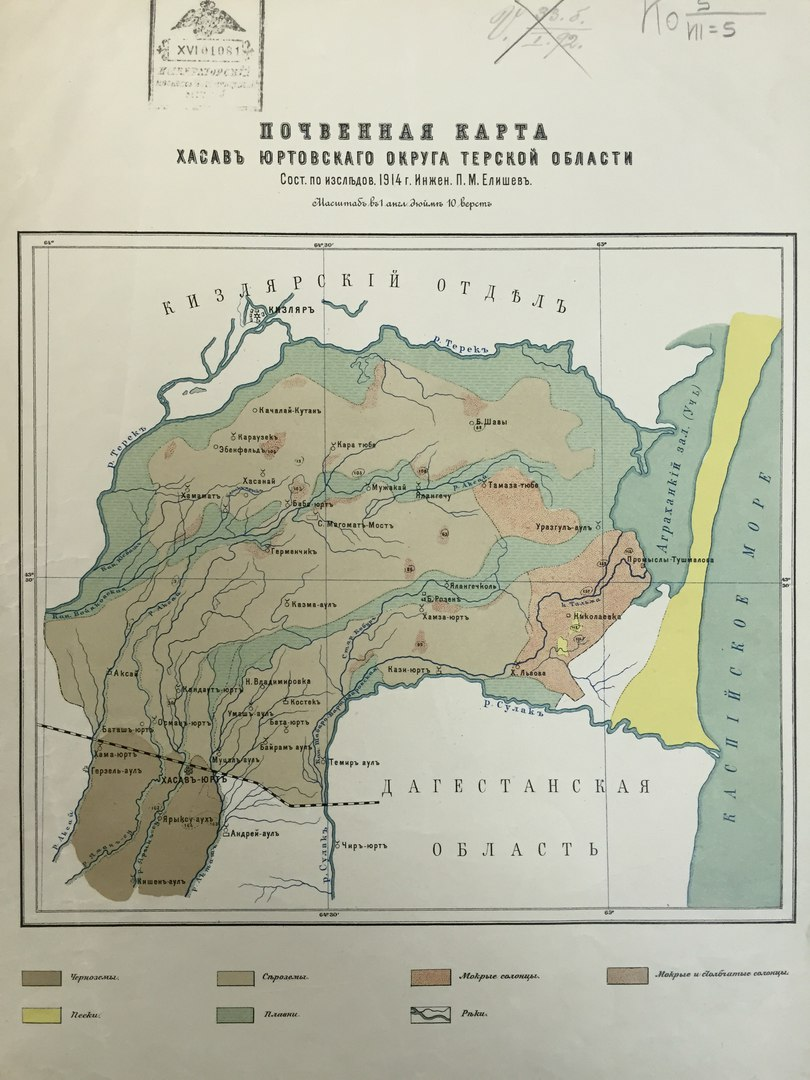
Soil map of the Khasavyurtovsky okrug

The formation of the Mountain Autonomous Soviet Socialist Republic in 1921 raised the question of the fate of the Khasavyurtovsky okrug, which was part of the Terek oblast. There were two main nationalities living in the district – Kumyks and Chechens. In March 1921, when the desire of the Kumyks to join the Dagestan Autonomous Soviet Socialist Republic became obvious, and the Chechens-Aukhovites — to the Mountain ASSR (which includes Chechnya), the problem arose of dividing the Khasavyurtovsky okrug between two neighboring autonomies: Mountain and Dagestan ASSRs. However, this option didn't suit the Chechens-Aukhovites. As a result, the congress of the Aukhovites, without making a concrete decision on the issue of joining the Mountain or Dagestan ASSR, limited itself to the demand of the Aukhovites in any case to preserve the Khasavyurtovsky okrug as a separate administrative unit. This was interpreted by the Khasavyurtovsky Revkom as the Aukhovites staying in the Khasavyurtovsky okrug as part of the Dagestan ASSR. This interpretation was actually supported by the commander of the Caucasian Labour Army, V. S. Muromtsev, who headed the commission for the establishment of borders between Dagestan and the Mountain ASSR. The statement of the Aukhov delegation made on 12 April 1921 in Vladikavkaz about the desire to join the Mountain ASSR was ignored. The annexation of the Khasavyurtovsky okrug to Dagestan was finalised in September 1921.

Bolshevik revolutionary and Soviet politician Sergei Kirov wrote the following to Dagestan regarding the accession of the Khasavyurt district:

And when the democracy of the Terek region posed these questions close to the landlords, the Kumyk princes, for example, try to connect the Khasavyurtov district to Dagestan in order to preserve the land and position. And I will say more: the enemies of the people are ready to attach one or another area not only to Dagestan, but to any remote province or even the state in order to save their lands and their wealth. And every speaker that these issues do not need to be resolved, plays a stronger to those gentlemen who do not want to part with their lands and economies with the help of any means.

— Sergei Kirov

== Demographics ==
=== Russian Empire Census ===
According to the Russian Empire Census, the Khasavyurtovsky okrug had a population of 70,800 on 28 January [O.S. 15 January] 1897, including 37,895 men and 32,905 women. The majority of the population indicated Kumyk to be their mother tongue, with significant Chechen, Avar-Andean, and Nogai speaking minorities.

Linguistic composition of the Khasavyurtovsky okrug in 1897
Language	Native speakers	%
Kumyk	26,108	36.88
Chechen	18,127	25.60
Avar-Andean	13,683	19.33
Nogai	4,000	5.65
Russian	3,188	4.50
Jewish	1,738	2.45
Tatar (Note: Before 1918, Azerbaijanis were generally known as "Tatars". This term, employed by the Russians, referred to Turkic-speaking Muslims of the South Caucasus. After 1918, with the establishment of the Azerbaijan Democratic Republic and "especially during the Soviet era", the Tatar group identified itself as "Azerbaijani".)	1,306	1.84
Ukrainian	1,284	1.81
Persian	258	0.36
Polish	231	0.33
Dargin	209	0.30
Kazi-Kumukh	147	0.21
German	145	0.20
Lithuanian	91	0.13
Armenian	76	0.11
Belarusian	65	0.09
Georgian	34	0.05
Kabardian	17	0.02
Ossetian	17	0.02
Circassian	13	0.02
Greek	6	0.01
Bashkir	4	0.01
Imeretian	4	0.01
Kalmyk	3	0.00
Karachay	3	0.00
Ingush	1	0.00
Romanian	1	0.00
Turkmen	1	0.00
Other	40	0.06
TOTAL	70,800	100.00

=== Kavkazskiy kalendar ===
According to the 1917 publication of Kavkazskiy kalendar, the Khasavyurtovsky okrug had a population of 87,654 on 14 January [O.S. 1 January] 1916, including 46,030 men and 41,624 women, 76,141 of whom were the permanent population, and 11,513 were temporary residents:

Nationality	Number	%
North Caucasians	61,640	70.32
Russians	17,859	20.37
Other Europeans	6,155	7.02
Jews	1,913	2.18
Armenians	87	0.10
TOTAL	87,654	100.00

== Bibliography ==
- Bournoutian, George A. (2018). Armenia and Imperial Decline: The Yerevan Province, 1900–1914. Milton Park, Abingdon, Oxon: Routledge. ISBN 978-1-351-06260-2. OCLC 1037283914.
- Кавказский календарь на 1913 год [Caucasian calendar for 1913] (in Russian) (68th ed.). Tiflis: Tipografiya kantselyarii Ye.I.V. na Kavkaze, kazenny dom. 1913. Archived from the original on 19 April 2022.
- Кавказский календарь на 1917 год [Caucasian calendar for 1917] (in Russian) (72nd ed.). Tiflis: Tipografiya kantselyarii Ye.I.V. na Kavkaze, kazenny dom. 1917. Archived from the original on 4 November 2021.
- Tsutsiev, Arthur (2014). Atlas of the Ethno-Political History of the Caucasus (PDF). Translated by Nora Seligman Favorov. New Haven: Yale University Press. ISBN 9780300153088. Archived (PDF) from the original on 17 June 2023.
