= Groznensky okrug =

Coordinates: 43°18′45″N 45°41′55″E

Groznensky okrug Грозненскій округъ
- Okrug
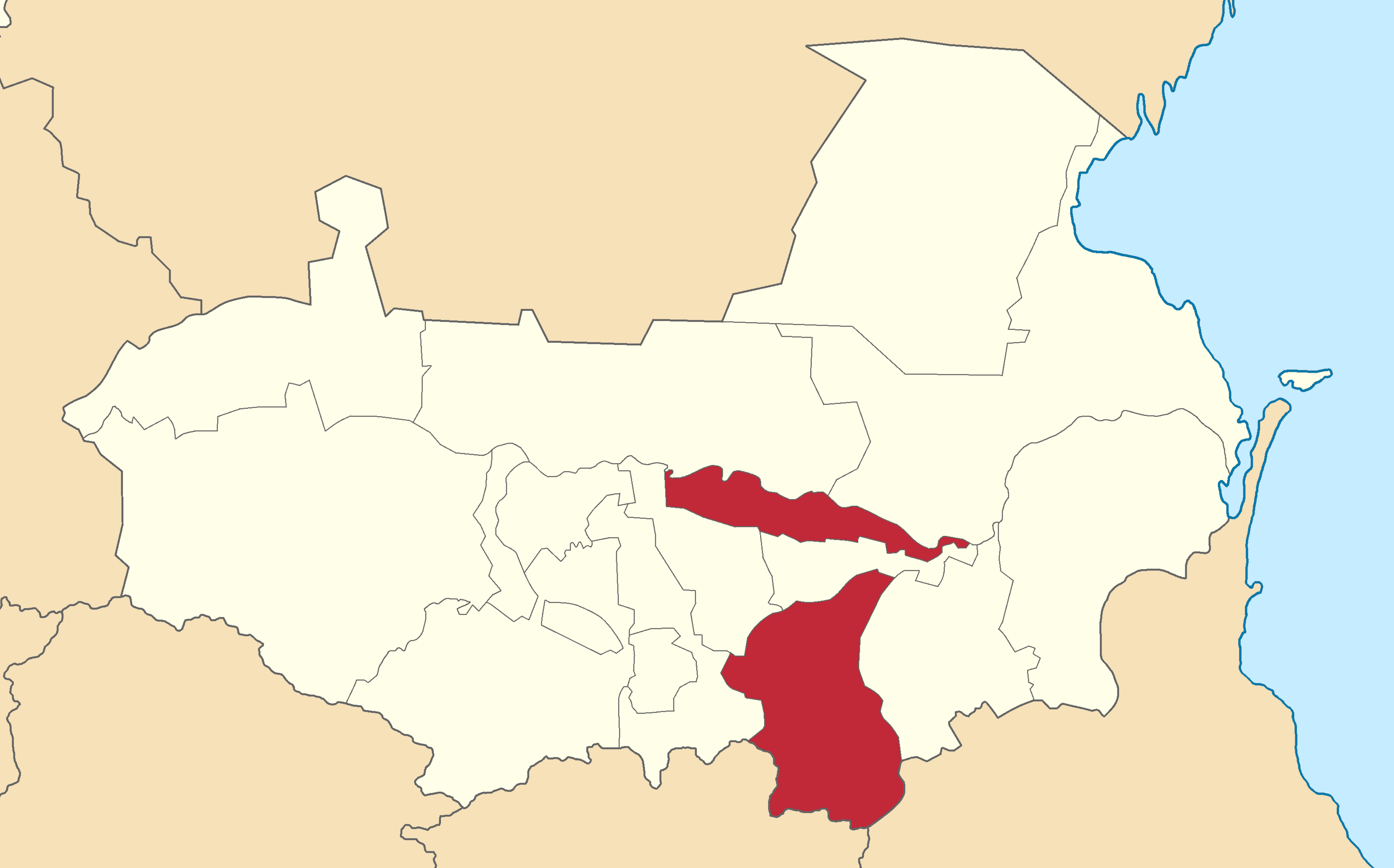
- Location in the Terek Oblast
- Country: Russian Empire
- Viceroyalty: Caucasus
- Oblast: Terek
- Established: 1888
- Abolished: 1921
- Capital: Grozny

Area
  - Total: 4,972.44 km^{2} (1,919.87 sq mi)

Population (1916)
  - Total: 195,744
  - Density: 39.3658/km^{2} (101.957/sq mi)
  - Urban: 27.36%
  - Rural: 72.64%

The Groznensky okrug (Note: Russian: Грозне́нский о́круг, pre-reform orthography: Грозне́нскій о́кругъ, romanized: Groznénsky ókrug) was a district (okrug) of the Terek Oblast of the Caucasus Viceroyalty of the Russian Empire. The area of the Groznensky okrug made up part of the North Caucasian Federal District of Russia. The district was eponymously named for its administrative centre, Grozny.

== Administrative divisions ==
The subcounties (uchastoks) of the Groznensky okrug were as follows:

Name	1912 population
1-y uchastok (1-й участок)	27,718
2-y uchastok (2-й участок)	20,557
3-y uchastok (3-й участок)	–
4-y uchastok (4-й участок)	26,772

== Demographics ==
=== Russian Empire Census ===
According to the Russian Empire Census, the Groznensky okrug had a population of 226,035 on 28 January [O.S. 15 January] 1897, including 117,888 men and 108,147 women. The majority of the population indicated Chechen to be their mother tongue, with a significant Russian speaking minority.

Linguistic composition of the Groznensky okrug in 1897
Language	Native speakers	%
Chechen	202,273	89.49
Russian	12,945	5.73
Kumyk	1,930	0.85
Jewish	1,825	0.81
Ukrainian	1,506	0.67
Circassian	1,037	0.46
Polish	849	0.38
Kazi-Kumukh	786	0.35
Avar-Andean	460	0.20
Armenian	399	0.18
Tatar (Note: Before 1918, Azerbaijanis were generally known as "Tatars". This term, employed by the Russians, referred to Turkic-speaking Muslims of the South Caucasus. After 1918, with the establishment of the Azerbaijan Democratic Republic and "especially during the Soviet era", the Tatar group identified itself as "Azerbaijani".)	354	0.16
Persian	301	0.13
Georgian	248	0.11
Dargin	210	0.09
Lithuanian	208	0.09
German	164	0.07
Ingush	136	0.06
Greek	96	0.04
Bashkir	66	0.03
Belarusian	34	0.02
Romani	31	0.01
Romanian	30	0.01
Ossetian	15	0.01
Nogai	13	0.01
Turkmen	7	0.00
Imeretian	6	0.00
Karachay	6	0.00
Kabardian	4	0.00
Other	96	0.04
TOTAL	226,035	100.00

=== Kavkazskiy kalendar ===
According to the 1917 publication of Kavkazskiy kalendar, the Groznensky okrug had a population of 195,744 on 14 January [O.S. 1 January] 1916, including 108,989 men and 86,755 women, 148,978 of whom were the permanent population, and 46,766 were temporary residents:

Nationality	Urban		Rural		TOTAL	
Nationality	Number	%	Number	%	Number	%
North Caucasians	7,069	13.20	126,011	88.62	133,080	67.99
Russians	42,353	79.09	15,422	10.85	57,775	29.52
Other Europeans	1,488	2.78	430	0.30	1,918	0.98
Armenians	1,512	2.82	332	0.23	1,844	0.94
Jews	1,127	2.10	0	0.00	1,127	0.58
TOTAL	53,549	100.00	142,195	100.00	195,744	100.00

== Bibliography ==
- Bournoutian, George A. (2018). Armenia and Imperial Decline: The Yerevan Province, 1900–1914. Milton Park, Abingdon, Oxon: Routledge. ISBN 978-1-351-06260-2. OCLC 1037283914.
- Кавказский календарь на 1913 год [Caucasian calendar for 1913] (in Russian) (68th ed.). Tiflis: Tipografiya kantselyarii Ye.I.V. na Kavkaze, kazenny dom. 1913. Archived from the original on 19 April 2022.
- Кавказский календарь на 1917 год [Caucasian calendar for 1917] (in Russian) (72nd ed.). Tiflis: Tipografiya kantselyarii Ye.I.V. na Kavkaze, kazenny dom. 1917. Archived from the original on 4 November 2021.
- Tsutsiev, Arthur (2014). Atlas of the Ethno-Political History of the Caucasus (PDF). Translated by Nora Seligman Favorov. New Haven: Yale University Press. ISBN 9780300153088. Archived (PDF) from the original on 17 June 2023.
