= Vedensky okrug =

Coordinates: 42°57′25″N 46°06′37″E

Vedensky okrug Веденскій округъ
- Okrug
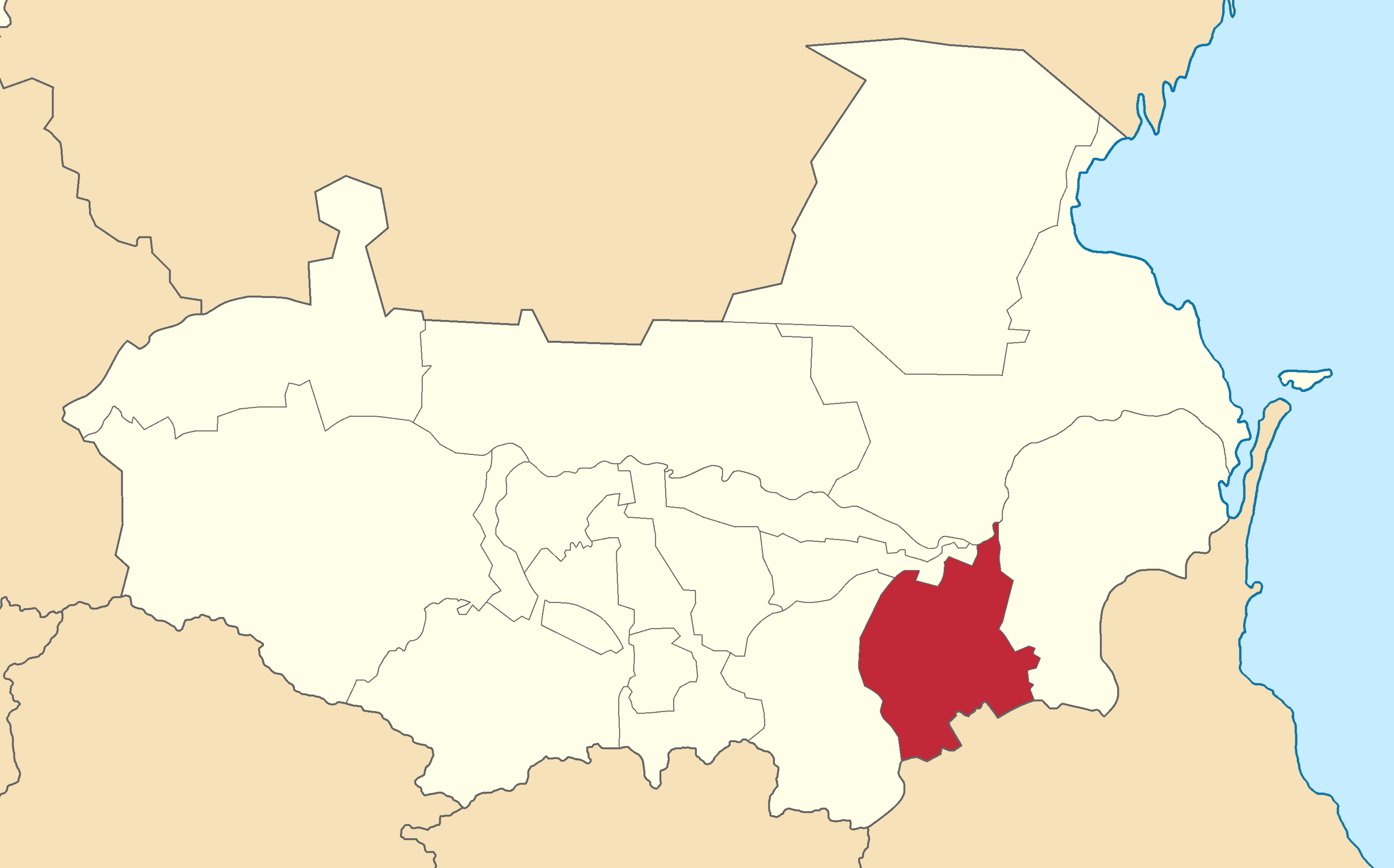
- Location in the Terek Oblast
- Country: Russian Empire
- Viceroyalty: Caucasus
- Oblast: Terek
- Established: 1905
- Abolished: 1921
- Capital: Vedeno

Area
  - Total: 3,803.05 km^{2} (1,468.37 sq mi)

Population (1916)
  - Total: 127,718
  - Density: 33.5830/km^{2} (86.9797/sq mi)
  - Rural: 100.00%

The Vedensky okrug (Note: Russian: Веде́нский о́круг, pre-reform orthography: Веде́нскій о́кругъ, romanized: Vedénsky ókrug) was a district (okrug) of the Terek Oblast of the Caucasus Viceroyalty of the Russian Empire. The area of the Vedensky okrug made up part of the North Caucasian Federal District of Russia. The district was eponymously named for its administrative centre, Vedeno.

== Administrative divisions ==
The subcounties (uchastoks) of the Vedensky okrug were as follows:

Name	1912 population
1-y uchastok (1-й участок)	22,437
2-y uchastok (2-й участок)	18,151
3-y uchastok (3-й участок)	33,731
4-y uchastok (4-й участок)	24,960

== Demographics ==
=== Kavkazskiy kalendar ===
According to the 1917 publication of Kavkazskiy kalendar, the Vedensky okrug had a population of 127,718 on 14 January [O.S. 1 January] 1916, including 67,444 men and 60,274 women, 125,801 of whom were the permanent population, and 1,917 were temporary residents:

Nationality	Number	%
North Caucasians	127,048	99.48
Sunni Muslims (Note: Primarily Turco-Tatars.)	311	0.24
Russians	307	0.24
Shia Muslims (Note: Primarily Tatars.)	26	0.02
Armenians	13	0.01
Other Europeans	7	0.01
Georgians	6	0.00
TOTAL	127,718	100.00

== Bibliography ==
- Hovannisian, Richard G. (1971). The Republic of Armenia. Vol. 1: The First Year, 1918–1919. Berkeley: University of California Press. ISBN 978-0520019843.
- Кавказский календарь на 1911 год [Caucasus calendar for 1911] (in Russian) (66th ed.). Tiflis: Tipografiya kantselyarii Ye.I.V. na Kavkaze, kazenny dom. 1911. Archived from the original on 31 January 2022.
- Кавказский календарь на 1913 год [Caucasian calendar for 1913] (in Russian) (68th ed.). Tiflis: Tipografiya kantselyarii Ye.I.V. na Kavkaze, kazenny dom. 1913. Archived from the original on 19 April 2022.
- Кавказский календарь на 1917 год [Caucasian calendar for 1917] (in Russian) (72nd ed.). Tiflis: Tipografiya kantselyarii Ye.I.V. na Kavkaze, kazenny dom. 1917. Archived from the original on 4 November 2021.
- Tsutsiev, Arthur (2014). Atlas of the Ethno-Political History of the Caucasus (PDF). Translated by Nora Seligman Favorov. New Haven: Yale University Press. ISBN 9780300153088. Archived (PDF) from the original on 17 June 2023.
