= Mozdoksky otdel =

Coordinates: 43°44′N 44°42′E

Mozdoksky otdel Моздокскій отдѣлъ
- Otdel
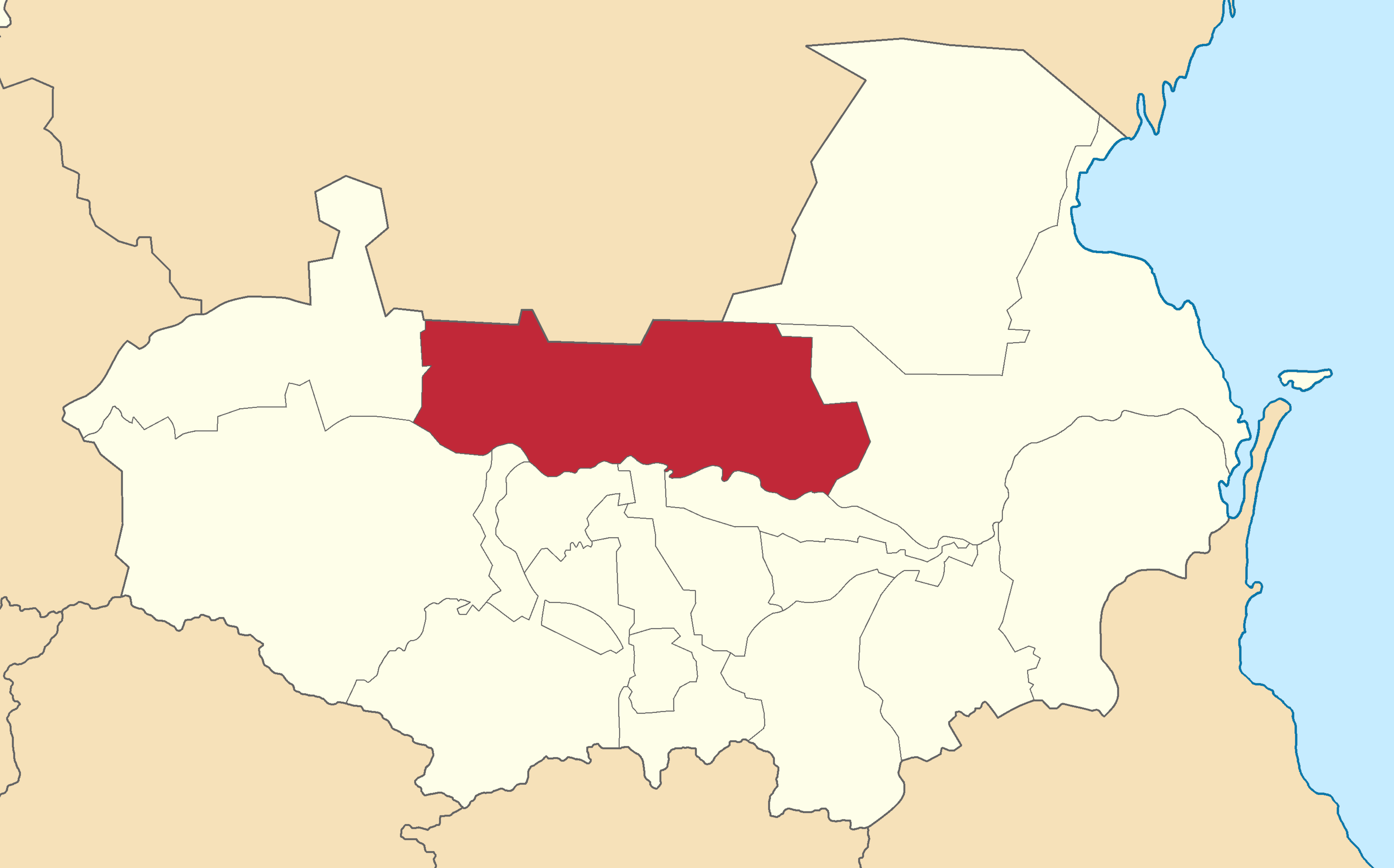
- Location in the Terek Oblast
- Country: Russian Empire
- Viceroyalty: Caucasus
- Oblast: Terek
- Established: 1899
- Abolished: 1924
- Capital: Mozdok

Area
  - Total: 3,738.25 km^{2} (1,443.35 sq mi)

Population (1916)
  - Total: 107,745
  - Density: 28.8223/km^{2} (74.6494/sq mi)
  - Urban: 15.32%
  - Rural: 84.68%

The Mozdoksky otdel (Note: Russian: Моздо́кскій отдѣ́лъ, romanized: Mozdóksky otdél) was a Cossack district (otdel) of the Terek oblast of the Caucasus Viceroyalty of the Russian Empire. The area of the Mozdoksky otdel makes up part of the North Caucasian Federal District of Russia. The district was eponymously named for its administrative center, Mozdok.

== Administrative divisions ==
The subcounties (uchastoks) of the Mozdoksky otdel were as follows:

Name	1912 population
1-y uchastok (1-й участокъ)	37,503
2-y uchastok (2-й участокъ)	32,304

== Demographics ==
=== Kavkazskiy kalendar ===
According to the 1917 publication of Kavkazskiy kalendar, the Mozdoksky otdel had a population of 107,745 on 14 January [O.S. 1 January] 1916, including 54,503 men and 53,242 women, 79,850 of whom were the permanent population, and 27,895 were temporary residents:

Nationality	Urban		Rural		TOTAL	
Nationality	Number	%	Number	%	Number	%
Russians	7,835	47.46	72,800	79.79	80,635	74.84
North Caucasians	4,120	24.95	9,775	10.71	13,895	12.90
Armenians	3,560	21.56	4,850	5.32	8,410	7.81
Other Europeans	895	5.42	3,330	3.65	4,225	3.92
Asiatic Christians	0	0.00	350	0.38	350	0.32
Jews	100	0.61	0	0.00	100	0.09
Sunni Muslims (Note: Primarily Turco-Tatars.)	0	0.00	65	0.07	65	0.06
Georgians	0	0.00	50	0.05	50	0.05
Roma	0	0.00	15	0.02	15	0.01
TOTAL	16,510	100.00	91,235	100.00	107,745	100.00

== Bibliography ==
- Hovannisian, Richard G. (1971). The Republic of Armenia. Vol. 1: The First Year, 1918–1919. Berkeley: University of California Press. ISBN 978-0520019843.
- Кавказский календарь на 1913 год [Caucasian calendar for 1913] (in Russian) (68th ed.). Tiflis: Tipografiya kantselyarii Ye.I.V. na Kavkaze, kazenny dom. 1913. Archived from the original on 19 April 2022.
- Кавказский календарь на 1917 год [Caucasian calendar for 1917] (in Russian) (72nd ed.). Tiflis: Tipografiya kantselyarii Ye.I.V. na Kavkaze, kazenny dom. 1917. Archived from the original on 4 November 2021.
- Tsutsiev, Arthur (2014). Atlas of the Ethno-Political History of the Caucasus (PDF). Translated by Nora Seligman Favorov. New Haven: Yale University Press. ISBN 9780300153088. Archived (PDF) from the original on 17 June 2023.
