= Nalchiksky okrug =

Coordinates: 43°29′N 43°37′E

Nalchiksky okrug Нальчикскій округъ
- Okrug
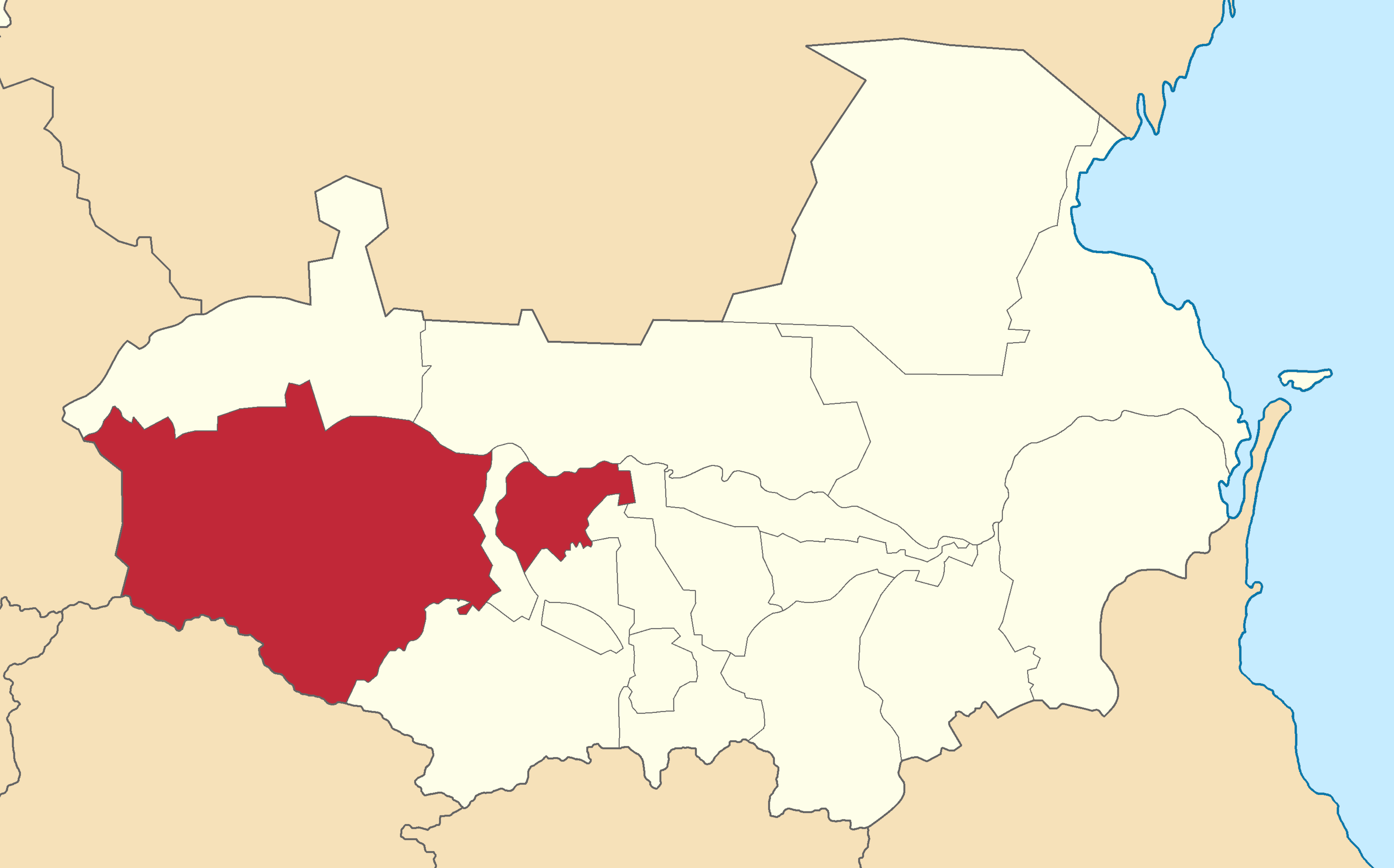
- Location in the Terek Oblast
- Country: Russian Empire
- Viceroyalty: Caucasus
- Oblast: Terek
- Established: 1882
- Abolished: 1921
- Capital: Nalchik

Area
  - Total: 11,902.25 km^{2} (4,595.48 sq mi)

Population (1916)
  - Total: 180,534
  - Density: 15.1681/km^{2} (39.2851/sq mi)
  - Rural: 100.00%

The Nalchiksky okrug (Note: Russian: Нальчи́кский о́круг, pre-reform orthography: Нальчи́кскій о́кругъ, romanized: Nalchíksky ókrug) was a district (okrug) of the Terek Oblast of the Caucasus Viceroyalty of the Russian Empire. The area of the Nalchiksky okrug made up part of the North Caucasian Federal District of Russia. The district was eponymously named for its administrative center, Nalchik.

== Administrative divisions ==
The subcounties (uchastoks) of the Nalchiksky okrug were as follows:

| Name | 1912 population |
|---|---|
| 1-y uchastok (1-й участок) | 45,902 |
| 2-y uchastok (2-й участок) | 26,735 |
| 3-y uchastok (3-й участок) | 40,296 |
| 4-y uchastok (4-й участок) | 21,755 |

== Demographics ==
=== Russian Empire Census ===
According to the Russian Empire Census, the Nalchiksky okrug had a population of 102,908 on 28 January [O.S. 15 January] 1897, including 53,203 men and 49,705 women. The majority of the population indicated Kabardian to be their mother tongue, with a significant Tatar (Note: In the 19th century, Balkars were generally known as "Mountain Tatars"/"Tatars".) speaking minority.

Linguistic composition of the Nalchiksky okrug in 1897
| Language | Native speakers | % |
|---|---|---|
| Kabardian | 64,746 | 62.92 |
| Tatar | 23,184 | 22.53 |
| Russian | 4,811 | 4.68 |
| Ukrainian | 4,745 | 4.61 |
| Ossetian | 2,728 | 2.65 |
| Jewish | 1,108 | 1.08 |
| German | 973 | 0.95 |
| Kumyk | 116 | 0.11 |
| Georgian | 105 | 0.10 |
| Armenian | 87 | 0.08 |
| Polish | 61 | 0.06 |
| Persian | 40 | 0.04 |
| Ingush | 36 | 0.03 |
| Kazi-Kumukh | 30 | 0.03 |
| Belarusian | 16 | 0.02 |
| Romani | 16 | 0.02 |
| Avar-Andean | 6 | 0.01 |
| Karachay | 6 | 0.01 |
| Lithuanian | 6 | 0.01 |
| Chechen | 4 | 0.00 |
| Bashkir | 3 | 0.00 |
| Nogai | 3 | 0.00 |
| Circassian | 2 | 0.00 |
| Romanian | 1 | 0.00 |
| Other | 75 | 0.07 |
| TOTAL | 102,908 | 100.00 |

=== Kavkazskiy kalendar ===
According to the 1917 publication of Kavkazskiy kalendar, the Nalchiksky okrug had a population of 180,534 on 14 January [O.S. 1 January] 1916, including 95,010 men and 85,524 women, 163,765 of whom were the permanent population, and 16,769 were temporary residents:

| Nationality | Number | % |
|---|---|---|
| North Caucasians | 134,390 | 74.44 |
| Russians | 37,810 | 20.94 |
| Other Europeans | 5,299 | 2.94 |
| Roma | 1,660 | 0.92 |
| Jews | 1,025 | 0.57 |
| Armenians | 350 | 0.19 |
| TOTAL | 180,534 | 100.00 |

== Bibliography ==
=== English sources ===
- Bournoutian, George A. (2018). Armenia and Imperial Decline: The Yerevan Province, 1900–1914. Milton Park, Abingdon, Oxon: Routledge. ISBN 978-1-351-06260-2. OCLC 1037283914.
- Tsutsiev, Arthur (2014). Atlas of the Ethno-Political History of the Caucasus (PDF). Translated by Nora Seligman Favorov. New Haven: Yale University Press. ISBN 9780300153088. Archived (PDF) from the original on 17 June 2023.

=== Russian sources ===
- Волкова, Н. Г. (1973). Лавров, Л. И. (ed.). Этнонимы и племенные названия Северного Кавказа [Ethnonyms and tribal names of the North Caucasus] (in Russian). Москва: Наука. pp. 1–210.
- Кавказский календарь на 1913 год [Caucasian calendar for 1913] (in Russian) (68th ed.). Tiflis: Tipografiya kantselyarii Ye.I.V. na Kavkaze, kazenny dom. 1913. Archived from the original on 19 April 2022.
- Кавказский календарь на 1917 год [Caucasian calendar for 1917] (in Russian) (72nd ed.). Tiflis: Tipografiya kantselyarii Ye.I.V. na Kavkaze, kazenny dom. 1917. Archived from the original on 4 November 2021.
