= Kizlyarsky otdel =

Coordinates: 43°51′N 46°43′E

Kizlyarsky otdel Килярскій отдѣлъ
- Otdel
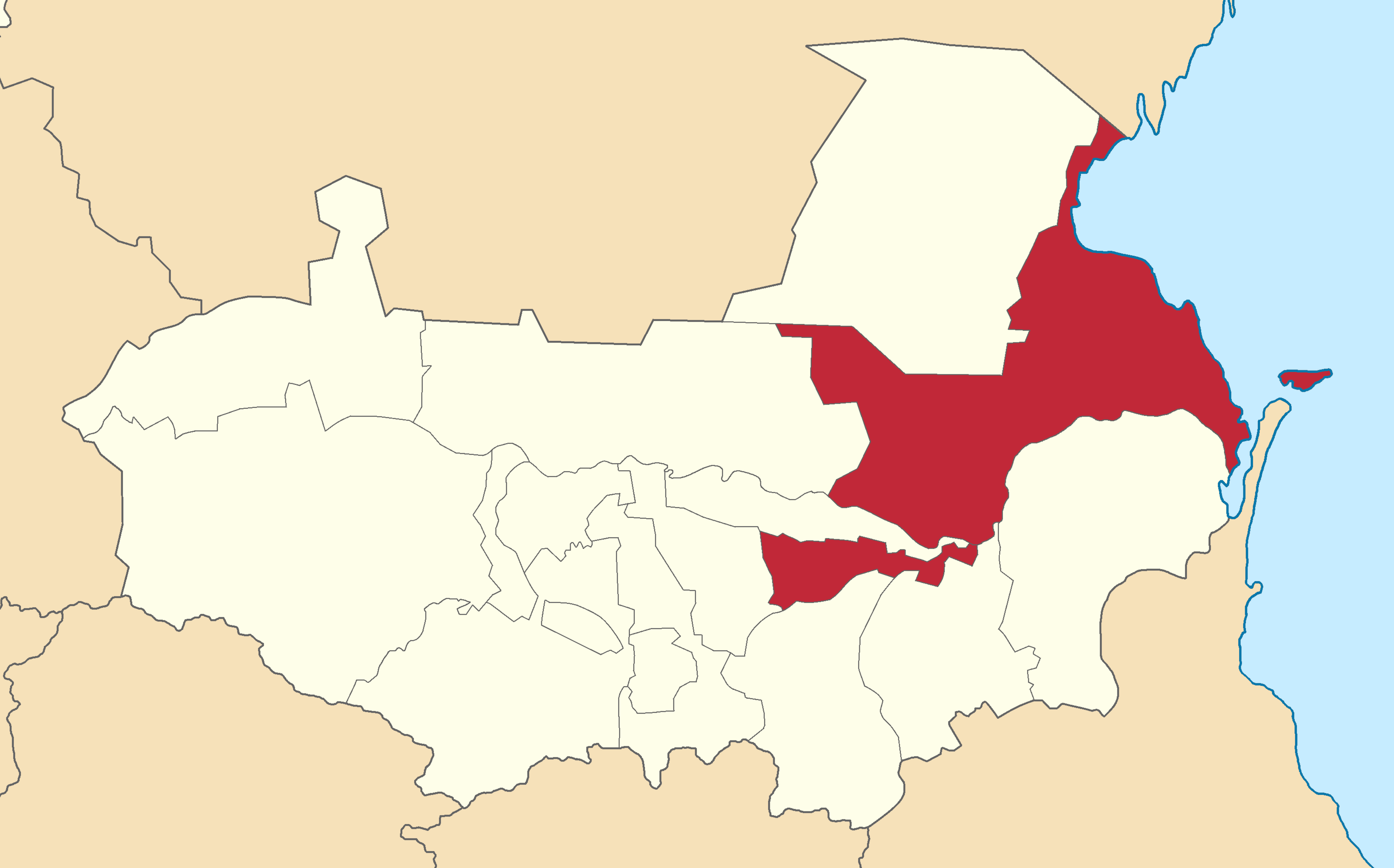
- Location in the Terek Oblast
- Country: Russian Empire
- Viceroyalty: Caucasus
- Oblast: Terek
- Established: 1785
- Abolished: 1924
- Capital: Grozny

Area
  - Total: 5,756.56 km^{2} (2,222.62 sq mi)

Population (1916)
  - Total: 136,749
  - Density: 23.7553/km^{2} (61.5260/sq mi)
  - Urban: 11.81%
  - Rural: 88.19%

The Kizlyarsky otdel (Note: Russian: Киля́рскій отдѣ́лъ, romanized: Kizlyársky otdél) was a Cossack district (otdel) of the Terek oblast of the Caucasus Viceroyalty of the Russian Empire. The area of the Kizlyarsky otdel makes up part of the North Caucasian Federal District of Russia. The district was eponymously named for its administrative center, Kizlyar.

== Administrative divisions ==
The subcounties (uchastoks) of the Kizlyarsky otdel were as follows:

Name	1912 population
1-y uchastok (1-й участок)	15,007
2-y uchastok (2-й участок)	28,325
3-y uchastok (3-й участок)	19,194
4-y uchastok (4-й участок)	35,290

== Demographics ==
=== Russian Empire Census ===
According to the Russian Empire Census, the Kizlyarsky otdel had a population of 102,395 on 28 January [O.S. 15 January] 1897, including 53,605 men and 48,790 women. The majority of the population indicated Russian to be their mother tongue, with a significant Nogai speaking minority.

Linguistic composition of the Kizlyarsky otdel in 1897
Language	Native speakers	%
Russian	53,785	52.53
Nogai	31,650	30.91
Armenian	4,681	4.57
Ukrainian	4,139	4.04
Kalmyk	1,417	1.38
Georgian	1,030	1.01
Turkmen	1,029	1.00
Kumyk	988	0.96
Tatar (Note: Before 1918, Azerbaijanis were generally known as "Tatars". This term, employed by the Russians, referred to Turkic-speaking Muslims of the South Caucasus. After 1918, with the establishment of the Azerbaijan Democratic Republic and "especially during the Soviet era", the Tatar group identified itself as "Azerbaijani".)	955	0.93
Chechen	864	0.84
Dargin	571	0.56
Persian	233	0.23
Kazi-Kumukh	195	0.19
Polish	177	0.17
German	113	0.11
Romani	107	0.10
Ossetian	105	0.10
Jewish	104	0.10
Avar-Andean	101	0.10
Ingush	41	0.04
Circassian	13	0.01
Greek	13	0.01
Belarusian	8	0.01
Romanian	8	0.01
Kabardian	7	0.01
Lithuanian	7	0.01
Imeretian	2	0.00
Karachay	2	0.00
Other	50	0.05
TOTAL	102,395	100.00

=== Kavkazskiy kalendar ===
According to the 1917 publication of Kavkazskiy kalendar, the Kizlyarsky otdel had a population of 136,749 on 14 January [O.S. 1 January] 1916, including 71,901 men and 64,848 women, 119,287 of whom were the permanent population, and 17,462 were temporary residents:

Nationality	Urban		Rural		TOTAL	
Nationality	Number	%	Number	%	Number	%
Russians	6,522	40.38	86,774	71.95	93,296	68.22
Sunni Muslims (Note: Primarily Turco-Tatars.)	0	0.00	28,294	23.46	28,294	20.69
Armenians	6,203	38.41	998	0.83	7,201	5.27
Shia Muslims (Note: Primarily Tatars.)	687	4.25	2,745	2.28	3,432	2.51
North Caucasians	1,726	10.69	691	0.57	2,417	1.77
Georgians	438	2.71	746	0.62	1,184	0.87
Jews	420	2.60	152	0.13	572	0.42
Other Europeans	155	0.96	198	0.16	353	0.26
TOTAL	16,151	100.00	120,598	100.00	136,749	100.00

== Bibliography ==
- Bournoutian, George A. (2018). Armenia and Imperial Decline: The Yerevan Province, 1900–1914. Milton Park, Abingdon, Oxon: Routledge. ISBN 978-1-351-06260-2. OCLC 1037283914.
- Hovannisian, Richard G. (1971). The Republic of Armenia. Vol. 1: The First Year, 1918–1919. Berkeley: University of California Press. ISBN 978-0520019843.
- Кавказский календарь на 1911 год [Caucasus calendar for 1911] (in Russian) (66th ed.). Tiflis: Tipografiya kantselyarii Ye.I.V. na Kavkaze, kazenny dom. 1911. Archived from the original on 31 January 2022.
- Кавказский календарь на 1913 год [Caucasian calendar for 1913] (in Russian) (68th ed.). Tiflis: Tipografiya kantselyarii Ye.I.V. na Kavkaze, kazenny dom. 1913. Archived from the original on 19 April 2022.
- Кавказский календарь на 1917 год [Caucasian calendar for 1917] (in Russian) (72nd ed.). Tiflis: Tipografiya kantselyarii Ye.I.V. na Kavkaze, kazenny dom. 1917. Archived from the original on 4 November 2021.
- Tsutsiev, Arthur (2014). Atlas of the Ethno-Political History of the Caucasus (PDF). Translated by Nora Seligman Favorov. New Haven: Yale University Press. ISBN 9780300153088. Archived (PDF) from the original on 17 June 2023.
