= Pyatigorsky otdel =

Coordinates: 44°03′N 43°04′E

Pyatigorsky otdel Пятигорскій отдѣлъ
- Otdel
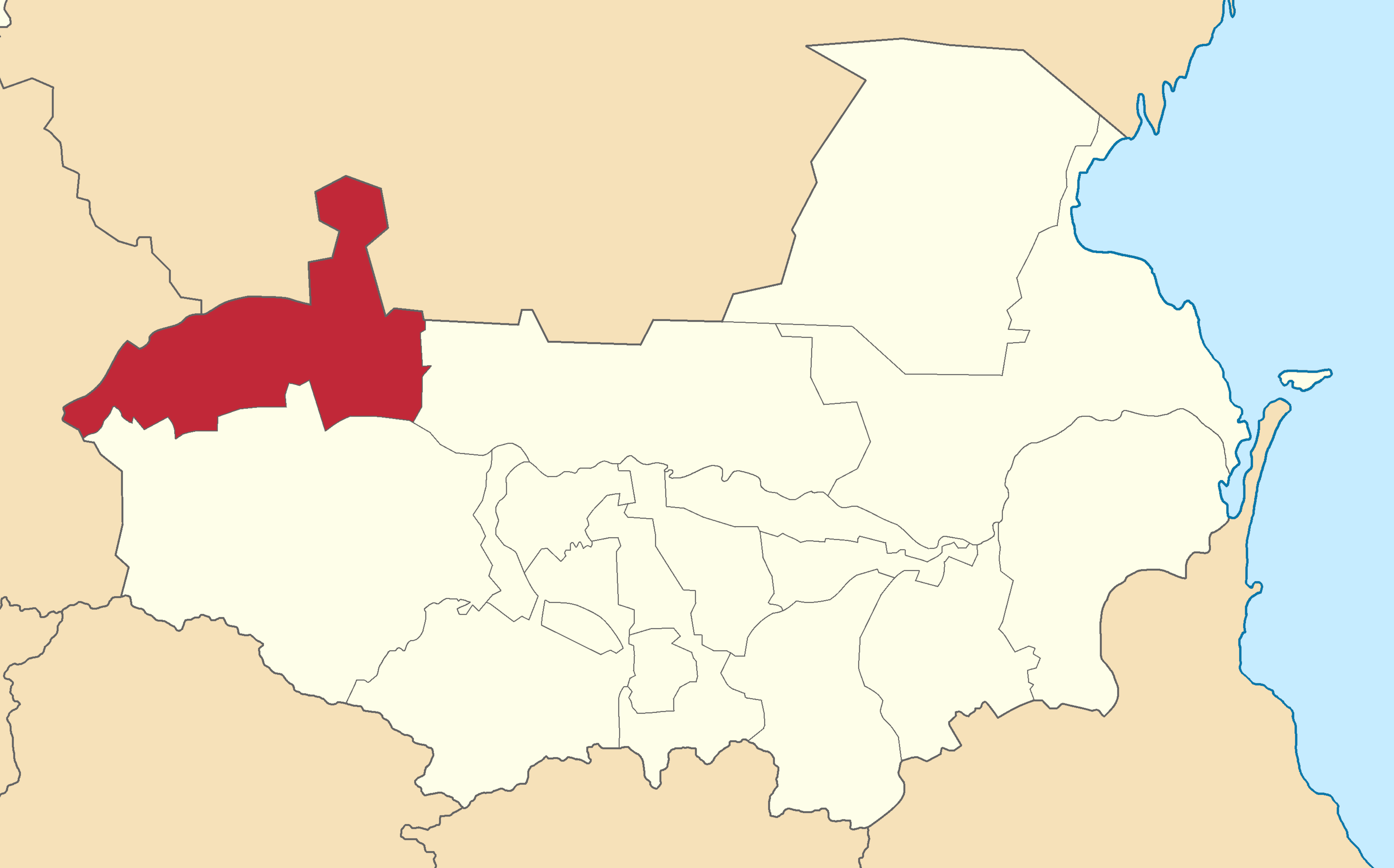
- Location in the Terek Oblast
- Country: Russian Empire
- Viceroyalty: Caucasus
- Oblast: Terek
- Established: 1785
- Abolished: 1924
- Capital: Pyatigorsk

Area
  - Total: 6,644.79 km^{2} (2,565.57 sq mi)

Population (1916)
  - Total: 200,486
  - Density: 30.1719/km^{2} (78.1449/sq mi)
  - Urban: 40.75%
  - Rural: 59.25%

The Pyatigorsky otdel (Note: Russian: Пятиго́рскій отдѣ́лъ, romanized: Pyatigórsky otdél) was a Cossack district (otdel) of the Terek oblast of the Caucasus Viceroyalty of the Russian Empire. The area of the Pyatigorsky otdel makes up part of the North Caucasian Federal District of Russia. The district was eponymously named for its administrative center, Pyatigorsk.

== Administrative divisions ==
The subcounties (uchastoks) of the Pyatigorsky otdel were as follows:

Name	1912 population
1-y uchastok (1-й участок)	43,052
2-y uchastok (2-й участок)	27,072

== Demographics ==
=== Russian Empire Census ===
According to the Russian Empire Census, the Pyatigorsky otdel had a population of 181,481 on 28 January [O.S. 15 January] 1897, including 93,961 men and 87,520 women. The majority of the population indicated Russian to be their mother tongue, with a significant Ukrainian speaking minority.

Linguistic composition of the Pyatigorsky otdel in 1897
Language	Native speakers	%
Russian	123,238	67.91
Ukrainian	25,032	13.79
German	5,872	3.24
Ossetian	4,620	2.55
Armenian	4,370	2.41
Kabardian	3,122	1.72
Persian	2,580	1.42
Kalmyk	2,174	1.20
Circassian	1,429	0.79
Avar-Andean	1,374	0.76
Polish	1,198	0.66
Tatar (Note: Before 1918, Azerbaijanis were generally known as "Tatars". This term, employed by the Russians, referred to Turkic-speaking Muslims of the South Caucasus. After 1918, with the establishment of the Azerbaijan Democratic Republic and "especially during the Soviet era", the Tatar group identified itself as "Azerbaijani".)	1,120	0.62
Belarusian	1,026	0.57
Nogai	900	0.50
Georgian	775	0.43
Jewish	476	0.26
Greek	338	0.19
Romani	276	0.15
Bashkir	271	0.15
Lithuanian	264	0.15
Karachay	197	0.11
Kumyk	175	0.10
Chechen	80	0.04
Kazi-Kumukh	96	0.05
Romanian	53	0.03
Imeretian	40	0.02
Ingush	23	0.01
Turkmen	17	0.01
Dargin	11	0.01
Other	334	0.18
TOTAL	181,481	100.00

=== Kavkazskiy kalendar ===
According to the 1917 publication of Kavkazskiy kalendar, the Pyatigorsky otdel had a population of 200,486 on 14 January [O.S. 1 January] 1916, including 103,598 men and 96,888 women, 117,908 of whom were the permanent population, and 82,578 were temporary residents:

Nationality	Urban		Rural		TOTAL	
Nationality	Number	%	Number	%	Number	%
Russians	71,569	87.61	110,791	93.26	182,360	90.96
Other Europeans	3,969	4.86	6,952	5.85	10,921	5.45
Armenians	3,664	4.49	337	0.28	4,001	2.00
North Caucasians	1,201	1.47	432	0.36	1,633	0.81
Georgians	849	1.04	13	0.01	862	0.43
Jews	324	0.40	1	0.00	325	0.16
Shia Muslims (Note: Primarily Tatars.)	82	0.10	154	0.13	236	0.12
Roma	0	0.00	109	0.09	109	0.05
Sunni Muslims (Note: Primarily Turco-Tatars.)	31	0.04	0	0.00	31	0.02
Asiatic Christians	0	0.00	8	0.01	8	0.00
TOTAL	81,689	100.00	118,797	100.00	200,486	100.00

== Bibliography ==
- Bournoutian, George A. (2018). Armenia and Imperial Decline: The Yerevan Province, 1900–1914. Milton Park, Abingdon, Oxon: Routledge. ISBN 978-1-351-06260-2. OCLC 1037283914.
- Hovannisian, Richard G. (1971). The Republic of Armenia. Vol. 1: The First Year, 1918–1919. Berkeley: University of California Press. ISBN 978-0520019843.
- Кавказский календарь на 1913 год [Caucasian calendar for 1913] (in Russian) (68th ed.). Tiflis: Tipografiya kantselyarii Ye.I.V. na Kavkaze, kazenny dom. 1913. Archived from the original on 19 April 2022.
- Кавказский календарь на 1917 год [Caucasian calendar for 1917] (in Russian) (72nd ed.). Tiflis: Tipografiya kantselyarii Ye.I.V. na Kavkaze, kazenny dom. 1917. Archived from the original on 4 November 2021.
- Tsutsiev, Arthur (2014). Atlas of the Ethno-Political History of the Caucasus (PDF). Translated by Nora Seligman Favorov. New Haven: Yale University Press. ISBN 9780300153088. Archived (PDF) from the original on 17 June 2023.
