= Sunzhensky otdel =

Coordinates: 43°19′N 45°04′E

Sunzhensky otdel Сунженскій отдѣлъ
- Otdel
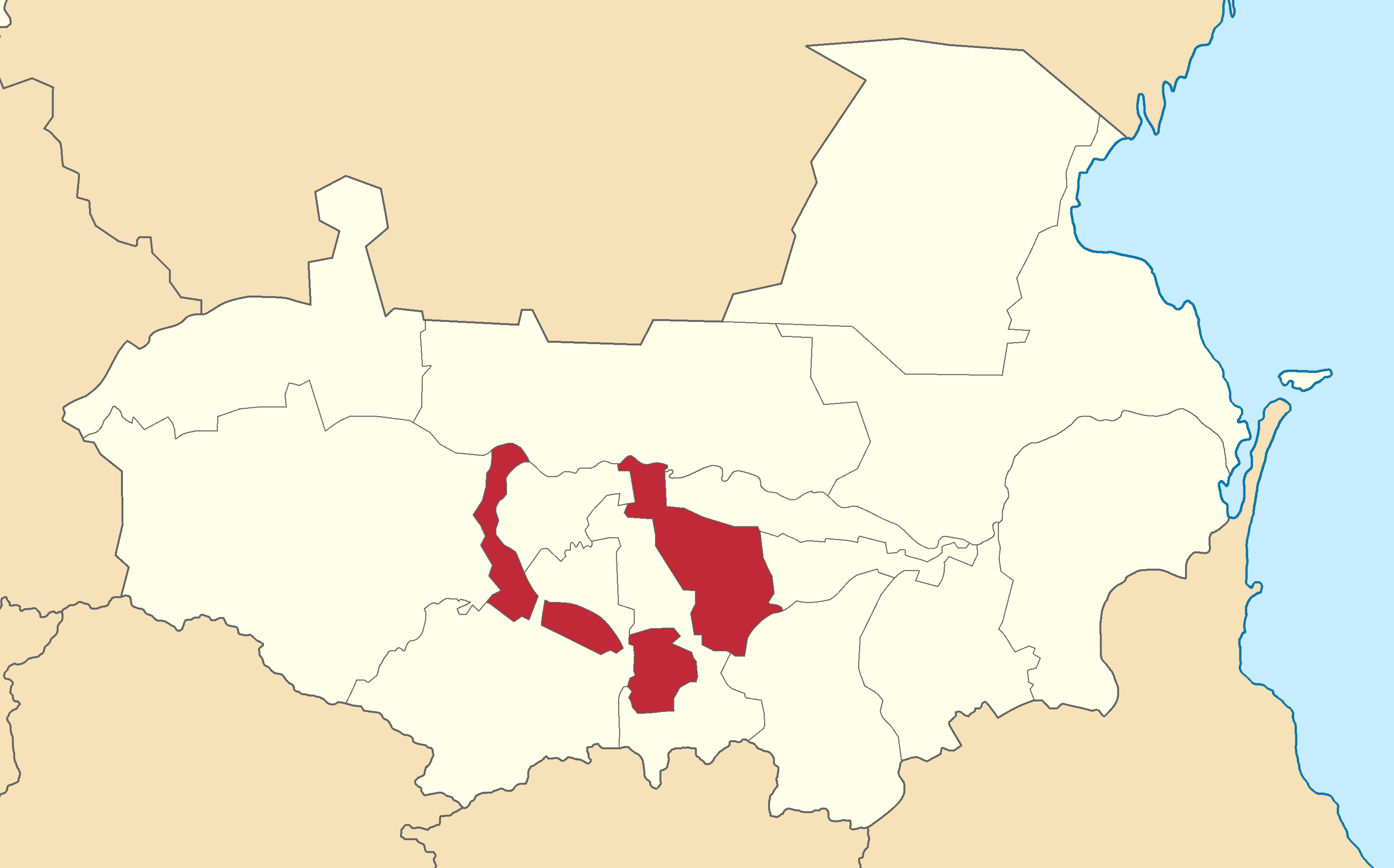
- Location in the Terek Oblast
- Country: Russian Empire
- Viceroyalty: Caucasus
- Oblast: Terek
- Established: 1888
- Abolished: 1920
- Capital: Vladikavkaz

Area
  - Total: 22,694.30 km^{2} (8,762.32 sq mi)

Population (1916)
  - Total: 74,505
  - Density: 3.2830/km^{2} (8.5029/sq mi)
  - Rural: 100.00%

The Sunzhensky otdel (Note: Russian: Сунженский отдел, pre-reform orthography: Сунженскій отдѣлъ, romanized: Sunzhensky otdel; Ingush: Шолжа отдел, romanized: Sholzha otdel) was a Cossack district (otdel) of the Terek oblast of the Caucasus Viceroyalty of the Russian Empire. The area of the Sunzhensky otdel makes up part of the North Caucasian Federal District of Russia.

== Administrative divisions ==
The subcounties (uchastoks) of the Sunzhensky otdel were as follows:

Name	1912 population
1-y uchastok (1-й участокъ)	26,148
2-y uchastok (2-й участокъ)	32,511

== Demographics ==
=== Russian Empire Census ===
According to the Russian Empire Census, the Sunzhensky otdel had a population of 115,370 on 28 January [O.S. 15 January] 1897, including 58,502 men and 56,868 women. The majority of the population indicated Ingush to be their mother tongue, with significant Russian and Kabardian speaking minorities.

Linguistic composition of the Sunzhensky Otdel in 1897
Language	Native speakers	%
Ingush	46,214	40.06
Russian	42,013	36.42
Kabardian	16,088	13.94
Ukrainian	3,891	3.37
Kumyk	2,349	2.04
Chechen	1,906	1.65
Ossetian	871	0.75
German	732	0.63
Georgian	403	0.35
Belarusian	233	0.20
Polish	146	0.13
Armenian	97	0.08
Tatar (Note: Before 1918, Azerbaijanis were generally known as "Tatars". This term, employed by the Russians, referred to Turkic-speaking Muslims of the South Caucasus. After 1918, with the establishment of the Azerbaijan Democratic Republic and "especially during the Soviet era", the Tatar group identified itself as "Azerbaijani".)	85	0.07
Imeretian	61	0.05
Romani	60	0.05
Avar-Andean	47	0.04
Kazi-Kumukh	41	0.04
Circassian	25	0.02
Bashkir	22	0.02
Jewish	18	0.02
Persian	11	0.01
Dargin	9	0.01
Romanian	8	0.01
Nogai	5	0.00
Greek	3	0.00
Other	32	0.03
TOTAL	115,370	100.00

=== Kavkazskiy kalendar ===
According to the 1917 publication of Kavkazskiy kalendar, the Sunzhensky otdel had a population of 74,505 on 14 January [O.S. 1 January] 1916, including 37,527 men and 36,978 women, 64,420 of whom were the permanent population, and 10,085 were temporary residents:

Nationality	Number	%
Russians	74,007	99.33
Georgians	185	0.25
Armenians	138	0.19
North Caucasians	87	0.12
Other Europeans	62	0.08
Sunni Muslims (Note: Primarily Turco-Tatars.)	26	0.03
TOTAL	74,505	100.00

== Bibliography ==
- Albogachieva, Makka (2015). "Демаркация границ Ингушетии" [Demarcation of the borders of Ingushetia] (PDF). In Karpov, Yury (ed.). Горы и границы: Этнография посттрадиционных обществ [Mountains and Borders: An Ethnography of Post-Traditional Societies] (in Russian). Saint Petersburg: Kunstkamera. pp. 168–255. ISBN 978-5-88431-290-6.
- Bournoutian, George A. (2018). Armenia and Imperial Decline: The Yerevan Province, 1900–1914. Milton Park, Abingdon, Oxon: Routledge. ISBN 978-1-351-06260-2. OCLC 1037283914.
- Hovannisian, Richard G. (1971). The Republic of Armenia. Vol. 1: The First Year, 1918–1919. Berkeley: University of California Press. ISBN 978-0520019843.
- Кавказский календарь на 1913 год [Caucasian calendar for 1913] (in Russian) (68th ed.). Tiflis: Tipografiya kantselyarii Ye.I.V. na Kavkaze, kazenny dom. 1913. Archived from the original on 19 April 2022.
- Кавказский календарь на 1917 год [Caucasian calendar for 1917] (in Russian) (72nd ed.). Tiflis: Tipografiya kantselyarii Ye.I.V. na Kavkaze, kazenny dom. 1917. Archived from the original on 4 November 2021.
- Tsutsiev, Arthur (2014). Atlas of the Ethno-Political History of the Caucasus (PDF). Translated by Nora Seligman Favorov. New Haven: Yale University Press. ISBN 9780300153088. Archived (PDF) from the original on 17 June 2023.
