= Mozdoksky =

Mozdoksky (masculine), Mozdokskaya (feminine), or Mozdokskoye (neuter) may refer to:

- Mozdoksky District, a district of the Republic of North Ossetia–Alania, Russia
- Mozdokskoye Urban Settlement, a municipal formation which Mozdok Town Under District Jurisdiction in Mozdoksky District of the Republic of North Ossetia–Alania, Russia is incorporated as
- Mozdoksky Uyezd, an administrative division of Caucasus Governorate in the Russian Empire
- Mozdoksky (rural locality), a rural locality (a khutor) in Stavropol Krai, Russia
