= Terek Oblast =

Coordinates: 43.0167°N 44.6500°E

Terek oblast Терская область
- Oblast
- Coat of arms

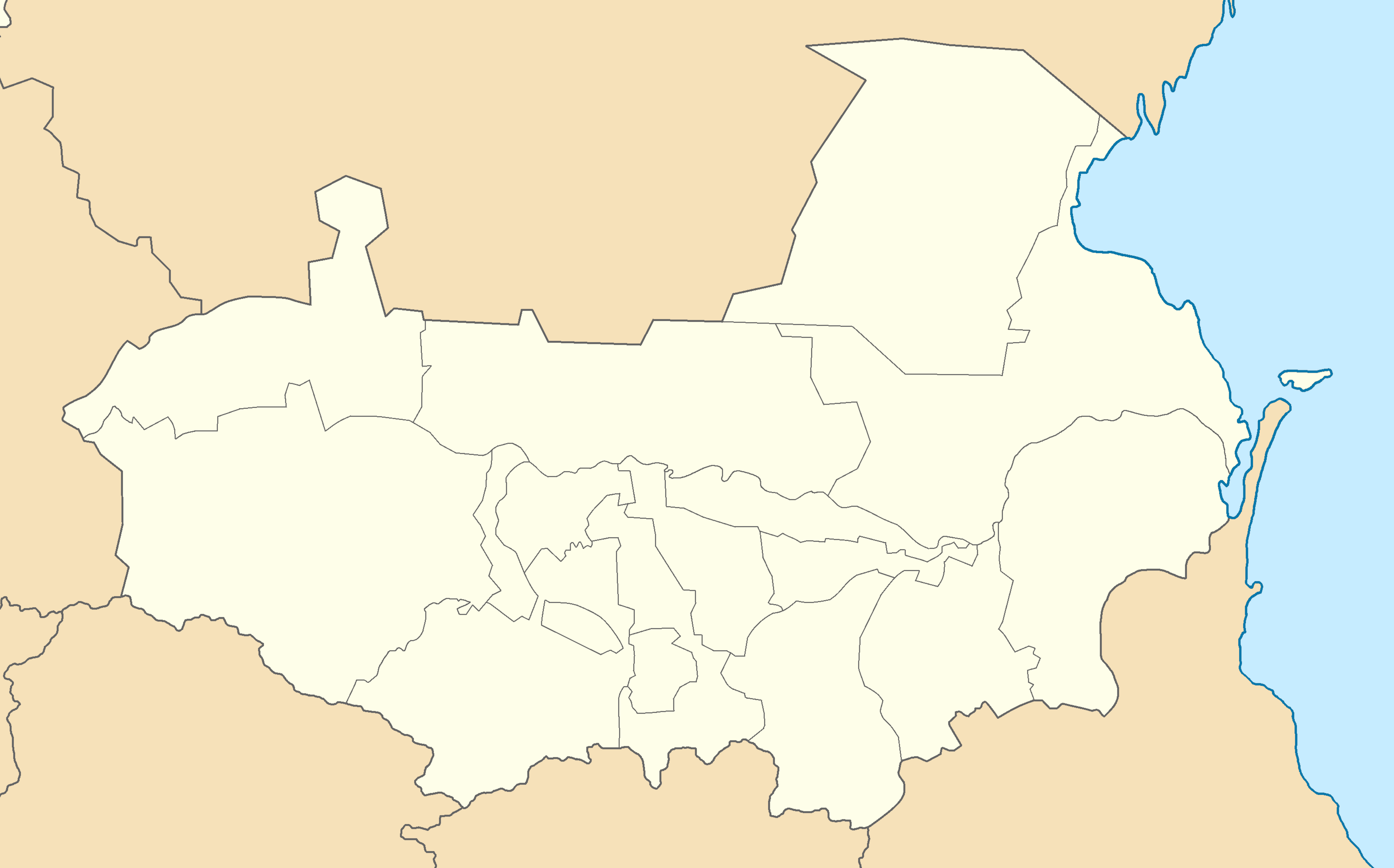
- Administrative map of the Terek Oblast
- Country: Russian Empire
- Viceroyalty: Caucasus
- Established: 1873
- Abolished: 1917
- Capital: Vladikavkaz

Area
  - Total: 72,443.86 km^{2} (27,970.73 sq mi)
- Highest elevation (Elbrus): 5,642 m (18,510 ft)

Population (1916)
  - Total: 1,377,923
  - Density: 19.02056/km^{2} (49.26303/sq mi)
  - Urban: 17.50%
  - Rural: 82.50%

The Terek Oblast (Note: Russian: Те́рская о́бласть, romanized: Térskaya óblast) was a province (oblast) of the Caucasus Viceroyalty of the Russian Empire, roughly corresponding to the central part of Russia's North Caucasian Federal District. Тhe оblast was created out of the former territories of the North Caucasian Peoples, following their conquests by Russia throughout the 19th century. The Terek Oblast bordered the Astrakhan and Stavropol governorates to the north, the Kuban Oblast to the west, the Kutaisi and Tiflis governorates to the south, and the Dagestan Oblast to the east. The administrative center of the oblast was Vladikavkaz, the current capital of North Ossetia–Alania within Russia.

== Administrative divisions ==
The districts (okrugs), Cossack districts (otdels), and pristavstvo of the Terek oblast in 1917 were as follows:

Name	Administrative centre			Population		Area
Name		1897	1917	1897	1916	Area
Vedensky okrug (Веденскій округъ)	Vedeno	–	–	–	127,718	3,341.69 square versts (3,803.05 km^{2}; 1,468.37 mi^{2})
Vladikavkazsky okrug (Владикавказскій округъ)	Vladikavkaz	43,740	73,243	134,947	207,742	5,023.10 square versts (5,716.60 km^{2}; 2,207.19 mi^{2})
Groznensky okrug (Грозненскій округъ)	Grozny	15,564	53,549	226,035	195,744	4,369.22 square versts (4,972.44 km^{2}; 1,919.87 mi^{2})
Nazranovskiy Okrug (Назрановскій округъ)	Nazran	–	–	–	59,046	1,341.00 square versts (1,526.14 km^{2}; 589.25 mi^{2})
Nalchiksky okrug (Нальчикскій округъ)	Nalchik	4,809	–	102,908	180,534	10,458.35 square versts (11,902.25 km^{2}; 4,595.49 mi^{2})
Kizlyarsky otdel (Килярскій отдѣлъ)	Kizlyar	7,282	16,151	102,395	136,749	5,058.21 square versts (5,756.56 km^{2}; 2,222.62 mi^{2})
Mozdoksky otdel (Моздокскій отдѣлъ)	Mozdok	9,330	16,510	–	107,745	3,284.75 square versts (3,738.25 km^{2}; 1,443.35 mi^{2})
Pyatigorsky otdel (Пятигорскій отдѣлъ)	Pyatigorsk	18,440	38,310	181,481	200,486	5,838.69 square versts (6,644.79 km^{2}; 2,565.57 mi^{2})
Sunzhensky otdel (Сунженскій отдѣлъ)	Sunzhenskaya (Sunzha)	3,456	–	115,370	74,505	19,941.18 square versts (22,694.30 km^{2}; 8,762.32 mi^{2})
Khasavyurtovsky okrug (Хасавюртовскій округъ)	Khasavyurt	5,312	–	70,800	87,654	4,699.26 square versts (5,348.05 km^{2}; 2,064.89 mi^{2})
Karanogayskoye pristavstvo (Караногайское приставство)	–	–	–	–	–	–

== Demographics ==
=== Russian Empire Census ===
According to the Russian Empire Census, the Terek oblast had a population of 933,936 on 28 January [O.S. 15 January] 1897, including 485,568 men and 448,368 women. The plurality of the population indicated Russian to be their mother tongue, with significant Chechen, Ossetian, Kabardian, and Ingush speaking minorities.

Linguistic composition of the Terek oblast in 1897
Language	Native speakers	%
Russian	271,185	29.04
Chechen	223,347	23.91
Ossetian	96,621	10.35
Kabardian	84,093	9.00
Ingush	47,184	5.05
Ukrainian	42,036	4.50
Nogai	36,577	3.92
Kumyk	31,826	3.41
Tatar (Note: Before 1918, Azerbaijanis were generally known as "Tatars". This term, employed by the Russians, referred to Turkic-speaking Muslims of the South Caucasus. After 1918, with the establishment of the Azerbaijan Democratic Republic and "especially during the Soviet era", the Tatar group identified itself as "Azerbaijani".)	27,370	2.93
Avar-Andean	15,721	1.68
Armenian	11,803	1.26
German	9,672	1.04
Jewish	6,328	0.68
Georgian	5,893	0.63
Persian	4,245	0.45
Polish	4,173	0.45
Kalmyk	3,595	0.38
Circassian	2,565	0.27
Belarusian	1,423	0.15
Kazi-Kumukh	1,416	0.15
Dargin	1,067	0.11
Turkmen	1,057	0.11
Greek	958	0.10
Lithuanian	789	0.08
Imeretian	756	0.08
Romani	493	0.05
Bashkir	398	0.04
Karachay	216	0.02
Romanian	156	0.02
Other	973	0.10
TOTAL	933,936	100.00

Religious composition of the Terek oblast in 1897
Faith	Male	Female	Both	
Faith	Male	Female	Number	%
Muslim	254,785	234,889	489,674	52.43
Eastern Orthodox	190,536	178,175	368,711	39.48
Old Believer	16,908	17,846	34,754	3.72
Armenian Apostolic	7,674	6,798	14,472	1.55
Lutheran	4,863	4,494	9,357	1.00
Judaism	3,652	2,924	6,576	0.70
Roman Catholic	4,559	1,086	5,645	0.60
Buddhist	2,235	1,894	4,129	0.44
Reformed	129	102	231	0.02
Mennonite	95	103	198	0.02
Armenian Catholic	39	33	72	0.01
Baptist	18	14	32	0.00
Anglican	4	2	6	0.00
Karaite	5	1	6	0.00
Other Christian denomination	6	1	7	0.00
Other non-Christian denomination	60	6	66	0.01
TOTAL	485,568	448,368	933,936	100.00

Linguistic composition of uezds in the Terek Oblast in 1897

Okrug	Russian		Chechen		Ossetian		Turkic		Circassian		Ingush		TOTAL
Okrug	Number	%	Number	%	Number	%	Number	%	Number	%	Number	%	TOTAL
Vladikavkaz	31,205	23.12	93	0.07	88,265	65.41	532	0.39	155	0.11	733	0.54	134,947
Grozny	12,945	5.73	202,273	89.49	15	0.01	2,297	1.02	1,041	0.46	136	0.06	226,035
Kizlyar	53,785	52.53	864	0.84	105	0.10	33,593 (Note: Majority Nogai)	32.81	20	0.02	41	0.04	102,395
Nalchik	4,811	4.68	4	0.00	2,728	2.65	23,303 (Note: Majority Tatar)	22.64	64,748	62.92	36	0.03	102,908
Pyatigorsk	123,238	67.91	80	0.04	4,620	2.55	2,195	1.21	4,551	2.51	23	0.01	181,481
Sunzha	42,013	36.42	1,906	1.65	871	0.75	2,439	2.11	16,113	13.97	46,214	40.06	115,370
Khasavyurt	3,188	4.5	18,127	25.6	17	0.02	31,414 (Note: Majority Kumyk)	44.37	30	0.04	1	0	70,800
TOTAL	271,185	25.8	223,347	21.25	96,621	9.19	95,753	9.11	86,658	8.25	47,184	4.49	1,051,032

=== Kavkazskiy kalendar ===
According to the 1917 publication of Kavkazskiy kalendar, the Terek oblast had a population of 1,377,923 on 14 January [O.S. 1 January] 1916, including 722,685 men and 655,238 women, 1,113,608 of whom were the permanent population, and 264,315 were temporary residents:

Nationality	Urban		Rural		TOTAL	
Nationality	Number	%	Number	%	Number	%
North Caucasians	22,655	9.39	648,548	57.05	671,203	48.71
Russians	175,155	72.64	417,886	36.76	593,041	43.04
Other Europeans	12,646	5.24	23,654	2.08	36,300	2.63
Armenians	23,265	9.65	7,165	0.63	30,430	2.21
Sunni Muslims (Note: Primarily Turco-Tatars.)	31	0.01	28,696	2.52	28,727	2.08
Shia Muslims (Note: Primarily Tatars.)	3,232	1.34	2,925	0.26	6,157	0.45
Jews	2,769	1.15	3,091	0.27	5,860	0.43
Georgians	1,287	0.53	2,674	0.24	3,961	0.29
Roma	102	0.04	1,784	0.16	1,886	0.14
Asiatic Christians	0	0.00	358	0.03	358	0.03
TOTAL	241,142	100.00	1,136,781	100.00	1,377,923	100.00

== Bibliography ==
- Bournoutian, George A. (2018). Armenia and Imperial Decline: The Yerevan Province, 1900–1914. Milton Park, Abingdon, Oxon: Routledge. ISBN 978-1-351-06260-2. OCLC 1037283914.
- Hovannisian, Richard G. (1971). The Republic of Armenia. Vol. 1: The First Year, 1918–1919. Berkeley: University of California Press. ISBN 978-0520019843.
- Кавказский календарь на 1917 год [Caucasian calendar for 1917] (in Russian) (72nd ed.). Tiflis: Tipografiya kantselyarii Ye.I.V. na Kavkaze, kazenny dom. 1917. Archived from the original on 4 November 2021.
- Tsutsiev, Arthur (2014). Atlas of the Ethno-Political History of the Caucasus (PDF). Translated by Nora Seligman Favorov. New Haven: Yale University Press. ISBN 9780300153088. Archived (PDF) from the original on 17 June 2023.
