= Nalchik (disambiguation) =

Nalchik is the capital city of the Kabardino-Balkarian Republic, Russia.

Nalchik may also refer to:

- Nalchiksky okrug, a district of the Russian Empire
- Nalchik Airport, an airport in the Kabardino-Balkarian Republic, Russia
- Nalchik River, a river in the Kabardino-Balkarian Republic
