= Makiev =

Makiev or Makiyev (Iron Ossetic: Мæхъитæ) is an Ossetian masculine surname, its feminine counterpart is Makieva or Makiyeva. It may refer to:

- Alan Makiev (born 1991), Russian footballer.
- Valeri Makiyev (born 1985), Russian footballer.
- Zaur Makiev (born 1992), Russian freestyle wrestler.
- Zauri Makiev (1950–2016), Soviet and Russian freestyle skiing coach.
- Zurab Makiev (born 1976), Russian politician
