= Mozdok Air Base =

Russian airbase in North Ossetia–Alania

Mozdok
- Mozdok, North Ossetia–Alania in Russia
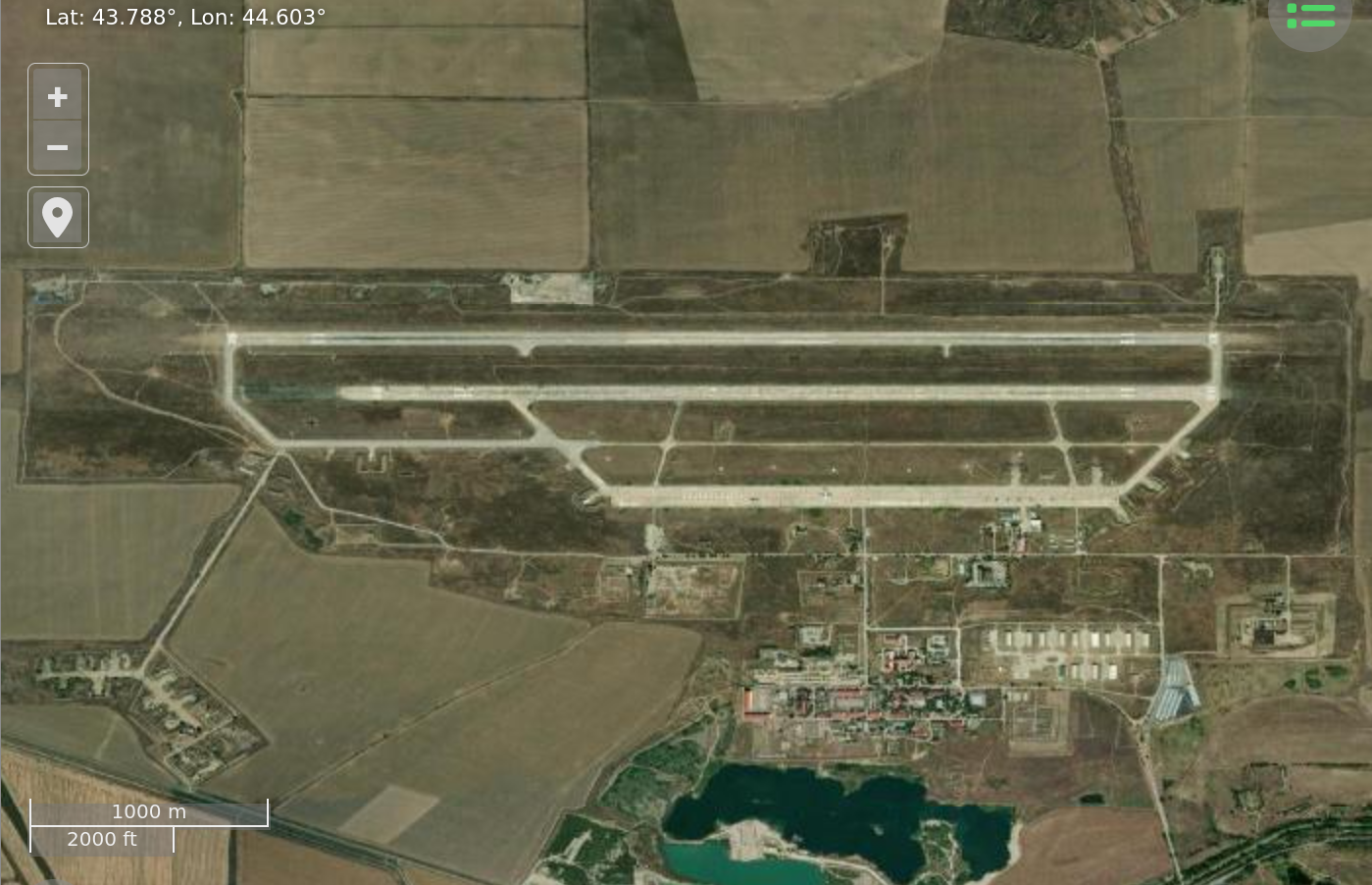
- Satellite imagery of Mozdok air base

Site information
- Type: Air Base
- Owner: Ministry of Defence
- Operator: Russian Air Force
- Controlled by: 6th Air and Air Defence Forces Army

Location
- Shown within North Ossetia–Alania Mozdok (Russia)
- Coordinates: 43°47′15″N 44°36′11″E

Site history
- In use: present

Airfield information
- Identifiers: ICAO: URMF
- Elevation: 142 metres (466 ft) AMSL
Runways
Direction	Length and surface
08L/26R	3,485 metres (11,434 ft) Concrete
08R/26L	3,000 metres (9,843 ft) Concrete

Mozdok is an airbase of the Russian Air Force located near Mozdok, North Ossetia–Alania, Russia.

The base is home to a detachment of the 485th Independent Helicopter Regiment.

== See also ==
- List of military airbases in Russia
