= Mozdoksky District =

Mozdoksky District Моздокский район (Russian)
- District

Other transcription(s)
  - Ossetic: Мæздæджы район
  - Kabardian: Мэздэгу къедзыгъуэ
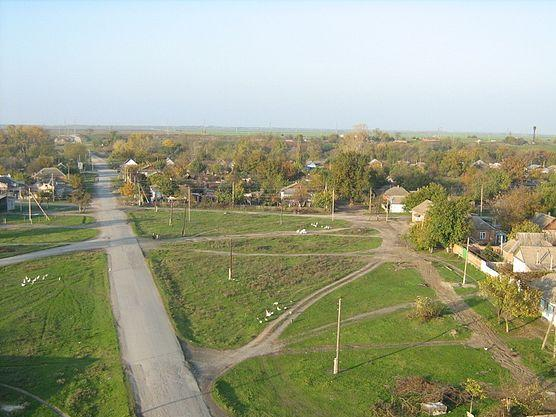
- The selo of Troitskoye in Mozdoksky District

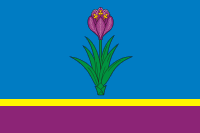
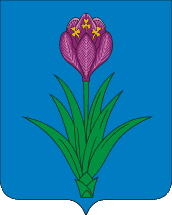
- Flag Coat of arms
- Location of Mozdoksky District in the Republic of North Ossetia–Alania
- Coordinates: 43°45′N 44°39′E
- Country: Russia
- Federal subject: Republic of North Ossetia–Alania
- Established: 2 June 1924
- Administrative center: Mozdok

Area
  - Total: 1,080 km^{2} (420 sq mi)

Population (2010 Census)
  - Total: 84,682
  - Density: 78.4/km^{2} (203/sq mi)
  - Urban: 45.8%
  - Rural: 54.2%

Administrative structure
  - Administrative divisions: 1 Towns under district jurisdiction, 17 Rural okrugs
  - Inhabited localities: 1 cities/towns, 32 rural localities

Municipal structure
  - Municipally incorporated as: Mozdoksky Municipal District
  - Municipal divisions: 1 urban settlements, 17 rural settlements
- Time zone: UTC+3 (MSK)
- OKTMO ID: 90630000
- Website: http://www.rso-a.ru/vlast/mozdok/

Mozdoksky District (Russian: Моздо́кский райо́н; Iron Ossetic: Мæздæджы район, romanized: Mæzdædžy rajon; Kabardian: Мэздэгу къедзыгъуэ, romanized: Mezdegu qedzigue) is an administrative and municipal district (raion), one of the eight in the Republic of North Ossetia–Alania, Russia. It is located in the north of the republic. The area of the district is 1,080 square kilometers (420 sq mi). Its administrative center is the town of Mozdok. Population: 84,682 (2010 census); 88,634 (2002 Census); 77,063 (1989 Soviet census). The population of Mozdok accounts for 45.8% of the district's total population.
