= Courland Viceroyalty =

Viceroyalty of the Russian Empire

Courland Viceroyalty Курляндское вице-королевство
- Viceroyalty of Russian Empire
- 1795–1796
- Capital: Mitau
- History
  - Established: 1795
  - Disestablished: 1796
| Preceded by | Succeeded by |
| Duchy of Courland and Semigallia | Governorate of Courland |
- Today part of: Latvia

The Courland Viceroyalty was one of the Baltic administrative regions of the Russian Empire.

In 1796, the viceroyalty had its name changed to the Courland Governorate. The viceroyalty was created in 1795 out of the territory of the Duchy of Courland and Semigallia which was incorporated into the Russian Empire as the province of Courland following the Third Partition of the Polish-Lithuanian Commonwealth.

The viceroyalty had its capital at Mitau (now Jelgava).
