= Mozdok =

Town in the Republic of North Ossetia-Alania, Russia

Mozdok Моздок
- Town

Other transcription(s)
  - Ossetic: Мæздæг
  - Kabardian: Мэздэгу
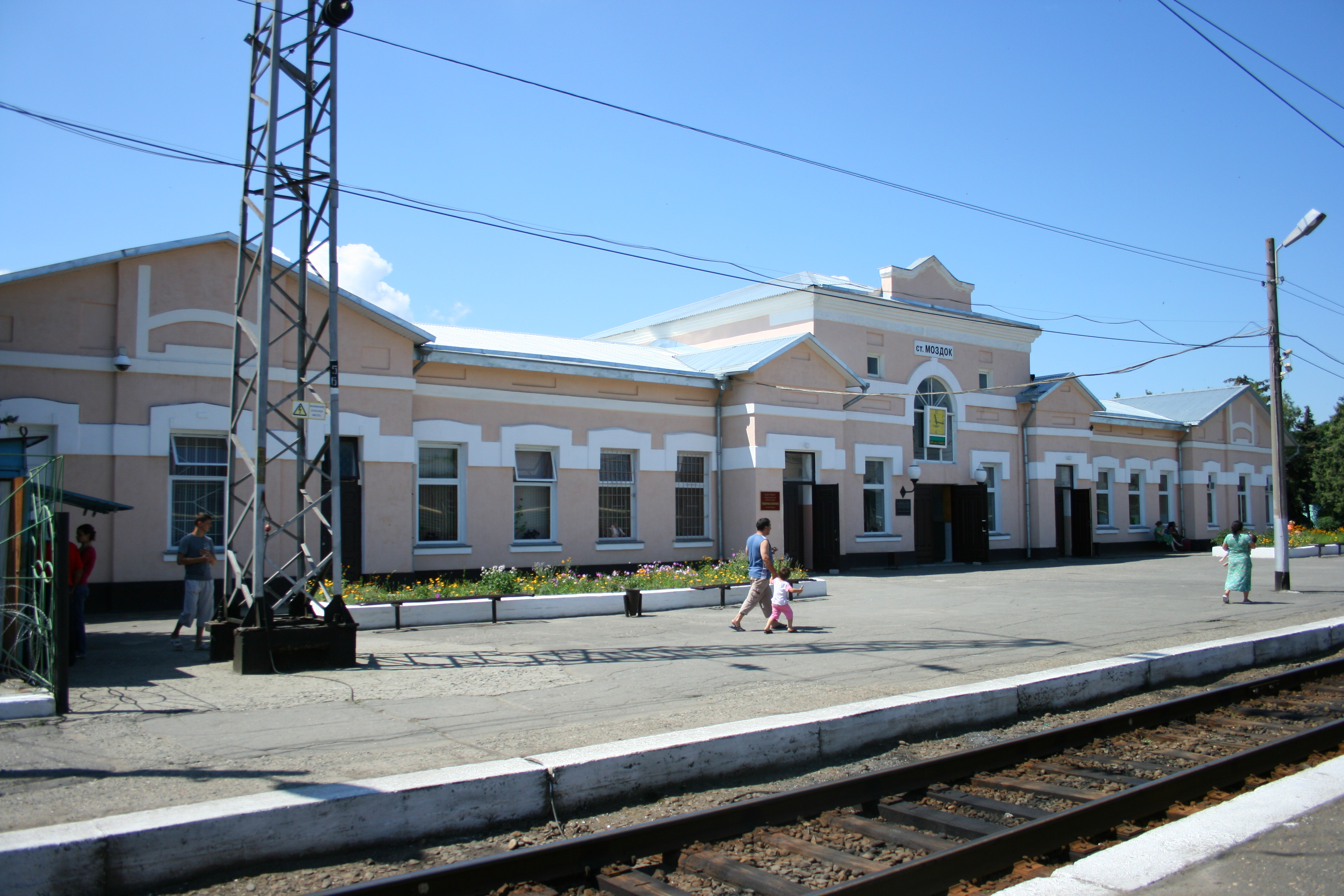
- Mozdok railway station

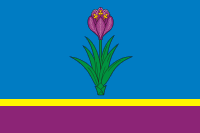
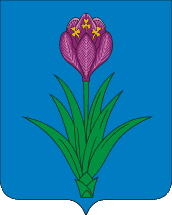
- Flag Coat of arms
- Interactive map of Mozdok
- Location of Mozdok Mozdok (North Ossetia–Alania)
- Coordinates: 43°44′8.14″N 44°39′11.83″E
- Country: Russia
- Federal subject: North Ossetia–Alania
- Administrative district: Mozdoksky District
- Town Under District JurisdictionSelsoviet: Mozdok
- Founded: 1763
- Elevation: 131 m (430 ft)

Population (2010 Census)
  - Total: 38,768
  - Estimate (2023): 35,662 (−8%)

Administrative status
  - Capital of: Mozdoksky District, Mozdok Town Under District Jurisdiction

Municipal status
  - Municipal district: Mozdoksky Municipal District
  - Urban settlement: Mozdokskoye Urban Settlement
  - Capital of: Mozdoksky Municipal District, Mozdokskoye Urban Settlement
- Time zone: UTC+3 (MSK)
- Postal codes: 362028, 363750–363760
- Dialing code: +7 86736
- OKTMO ID: 90630101001

Mozdok (Russian: Моздо́к; Iron Ossetic: Мæздæг, romanized: Mæzdæg; Kabardian: Мэздэгу, romanized: Mezdegu) is a town and the administrative center of Mozdoksky District in North Ossetia–Alania, Russia, located on the left shore of the Terek River, 92 kilometers (57 mi) north of the republic's capital Vladikavkaz. As of the 2010 Census, its population was 38,768.

== Etymology ==
The town's name comes from мэз дэгу (mez degu), a Kabardian word meaning "the deaf forest".

== History ==
It was established in 1763 as a Russian fort at the site of a Kabardian village founded four years earlier, settling the families of the Volga Cossacks in stanitsas around it.

In 1764, one of the first Ossetian schools was opened in Mozdok.

In 1764, the Kabardian leaders' request to the Russian government that the fortress be destroyed went unanswered. In the years that followed, the Kabardians tried to besiege the town, but they were eventually compelled to retreat. The earliest data on the population of Mozdok dates back to 1764, when it was predominantly inhabited by Christianized Ossetians and Kabardians. With the foundation of Mozdok, Russian authorities encouraged Ossetians, Georgians, Armenians, Spiritual Christians and other Christians to populate the town. It soon emerged as a key Russian military outpost linked to Kizlyar with a fortified line as well as the center of local trade, ethnic diversity, and Russian-Caucasian interchange. In 1789, 55.6% of its population was Armenian and Georgian. Ossetian settlement particularly increased in the 1820s when the Russian commander Yermolov began removing Kabardians from the area of the Georgian Military Road and settling Ossetians there.

Moving south from Mozdok, Russia established contact with eastern Georgia through the Darial Gorge. Mozdok remained the northern terminal of the Georgian Military Road leading to Tbilisi until being succeeded by Vladikavkaz, founded in 1784 midway between Mozdok and the Darial Pass. During the Russian Empire, the town was the administrative capital of the Mozdoksky Otdel of the Terek Oblast. In the beginning of the 19th century, some Muslim Ossetian families from Digoria settled in Mozdok establishing a Muslim Digor community there which still exists today.

The Brothers Dubinin created the world's first oil refining apparatus in Mozdok in 1823.

On August 23, 1942, it was conquered by German troops during Case Blue. It was recaptured by the Red Army on January 3, 1943.

In June 2003, a suicide bomber struck a bus full of Russian air force personnel with their car. On August 1, 2003, a military hospital in the city was targeted by a suicide bomber driving a large truck bomb. The building was substantially damaged and over fifty people were killed in the blast. These attacks are just two of a string of attacks on Russian facilities in Mozdok since the start of the Second Chechen War.

== Administrative and municipal status ==
Within the framework of administrative divisions, Mozdok serves as the administrative center of Mozdoksky District. As an administrative division, it is incorporated within Mozdoksky District as Mozdok Town Under District Jurisdiction. As a municipal division, Mozdok Town Under District Jurisdiction is incorporated within Mozdoksky Municipal District as Mozdokskoye Urban Settlement.

== Culture ==
The Museum of Regional Studies in Mozdok holds an assortment of displays and artifacts related to Mozdok's history.

== Demographics ==
Historical population
| Year | Pop. | ±% |
|---|---|---|
| 1777 | 1,535 | — |
| 1897 | 9,300 | +505.9% |
| 1926 | 14,000 | +50.5% |
| 1939 | 19,081 | +36.3% |
| 1959 | 25,611 | +34.2% |
| 1970 | 32,350 | +26.3% |
| 1979 | 34,394 | +6.3% |
| 1989 | 38,037 | +10.6% |
| 2002 | 42,865 | +12.7% |
| 2010 | 38,768 | −9.6% |
| 2021 | 36,784 | −5.1% |
Source: Census data

According to the census of September 12, 1777, the following residents (excluding the near stanitsas) were living in Mozdok; 674 Georgians, 565 Armenians, 180 Kabardians, 95 Ossetians and 21 Greeks.

As of 2002, the ethnic makeup of Mozdok was as follows:

- Russians: 62.7%
- Ossetians: 7.7%
- Armenians: 6.1%
- Kumyks: 4.6%
- Chechens: 4.3%
- Kabardians: 3.2%
- Koreans: 2.4%
- Other: 9.0%

== Military ==
The Mozdok airbase is nearby. From 1961 to 1998, the 182nd Heavy Bomber Aviation Regiment of Long Range Aviation, flying Tupolev Tu-95s, was based there. The airbase has been used to support military operations in Chechnya during the First Chechen War, Second Chechen War, and in the Russo-Georgian War. In June 2003, a female suicide bomber targeted a bus carrying pilots and other personnel employed at the airbase on the Mozdok-Prokhladnoye motorway, killing approximately 15 and wounding 12.

== Notable people ==
- Sergei Aslamazyan, was a Soviet Armenian cellist, composer, People's Artist of Armenian SSR (1945), awarded the Stalin Prize (1946).
- Valeri Makiyev, professional footballer
- Arslanbek Makhmudov, professional boxer
