= Valeri Makiyev =

Russian footballer

Personal information
- Full name: Valeri Eduardovich Makiyev
- Date of birth: 16 June 1985 (age 41)
- Place of birth: Mozdok, North Ossetia–Alania, Russian SFSR
- Height: 1.70 m (5 ft 7 in)
- Position: Midfielder

Youth career
- DYuSSh Mozdok

Senior career*
| Years | Team | Apps | (Gls) |
| 2002 | Mozdok | 7 | (0) |
| 2002–2003 | FC Vladikavkaz | | |
| 2004–2005 | Lokomotiv Minsk | 9 | (0) |
| 2006 | Lobnya-Alla Lobnya | 12 | (0) |
| 2007–2008 | Spartak Kostroma | 56 | (5) |
| 2009 | Avtodor Vladikavkaz | 17 | (2) |
| 2009 | Nosta Novotroitsk | 11 | (0) |
| 2010 | Torpedo-ZIL Moscow | 28 | (2) |
| 2011–2012 | Torpedo Vladimir | 29 | (0) |
| 2012–2014 | Chernomorets Novorossiysk | 55 | (2) |
| 2014–2015 | Banga Gargždai | 10 | (1) |
| 2015–2016 | Alania Vladikavkaz | 18 | (1) |
| 2017 | Rubin Yalta | | |
| 2018 | Olimp Moscow | | |
| 2019 | Olimp-2 Khimki | | |
- * Club domestic league appearances and goals

Valeri Eduardovich Makiyev (Russian: Валерий Эдуардович Макиев; born 16 June 1985) is a Russian former professional footballer who played as a midfielder.

== Club career ==
He played two seasons in the Russian Football National League for FC Nosta Novotroitsk and FC Torpedo Vladimir.
