= Uchastok =

Type of administrative subdivision

An uchastok (Russian: Участок) or police prefecture (полицейский участок) was a territorial-administrative unit of the Russian Empire and early Russian SFSR. Throughout most of modern Russian history, uchastoks, which numbered 2,523 throughout the empire by 1914, were a third-level administrative division, below okrugs, uezd and otdels (counties). In a literal sense, uchastok approximately corresponds to the English term plot, however, in practical usage it corresponded to a municipal district.

== History ==
In 1708, an administrative reform carried out by Tsar Peter the Great divided Russia into guberniyas (provinces) with subordinate uezds, whereas oblasts (regions) consisted of okrugs (counties), or otdels (Cossack counties), however, the counties of all were usually divided into either uchastoks or volosts, with the exception of the uezds of the Black Sea Governorate which did not have any sub-counties.

By the Soviet administrative reform of 1923–1929, most of the uchastoks were transformed into raions (districts), which corresponded in a similar land size, however, were subordinate directly to its Soviet republic rather than to any larger province or county.

== Administration ==
Police prefectures were headed by a local police chief and had communes (сельское общество) consisting of a number of villages subordinate to it. A mahal (магал) is a similar sub-county which was less-commonly used but still equivalent to an uchastok, however, a stanitsa—which was common in otdels—was always subordinate to an uchastok.

The equivalent of an uchastok in the Dagestan Oblast was a nai-bate, which was ruled by a naib or local leader, who was a military deputy appointed by higher authorities (analogous to a pristav, or military commandant).

== See also ==
- History of the administrative division of Russia
- List of viceroyalties of the Russian Empire
