= Caucasus Viceroyalty (1801–1917) =

Viceroyalty of the Russian Empire

Coordinates: 41°43′21″N 44°47′33″E

Caucasus Viceroyalty Кавказское наместничество (Russian) Кавказское намѣстничество Kavkazskoye namestnichestvo
- Viceroyalty
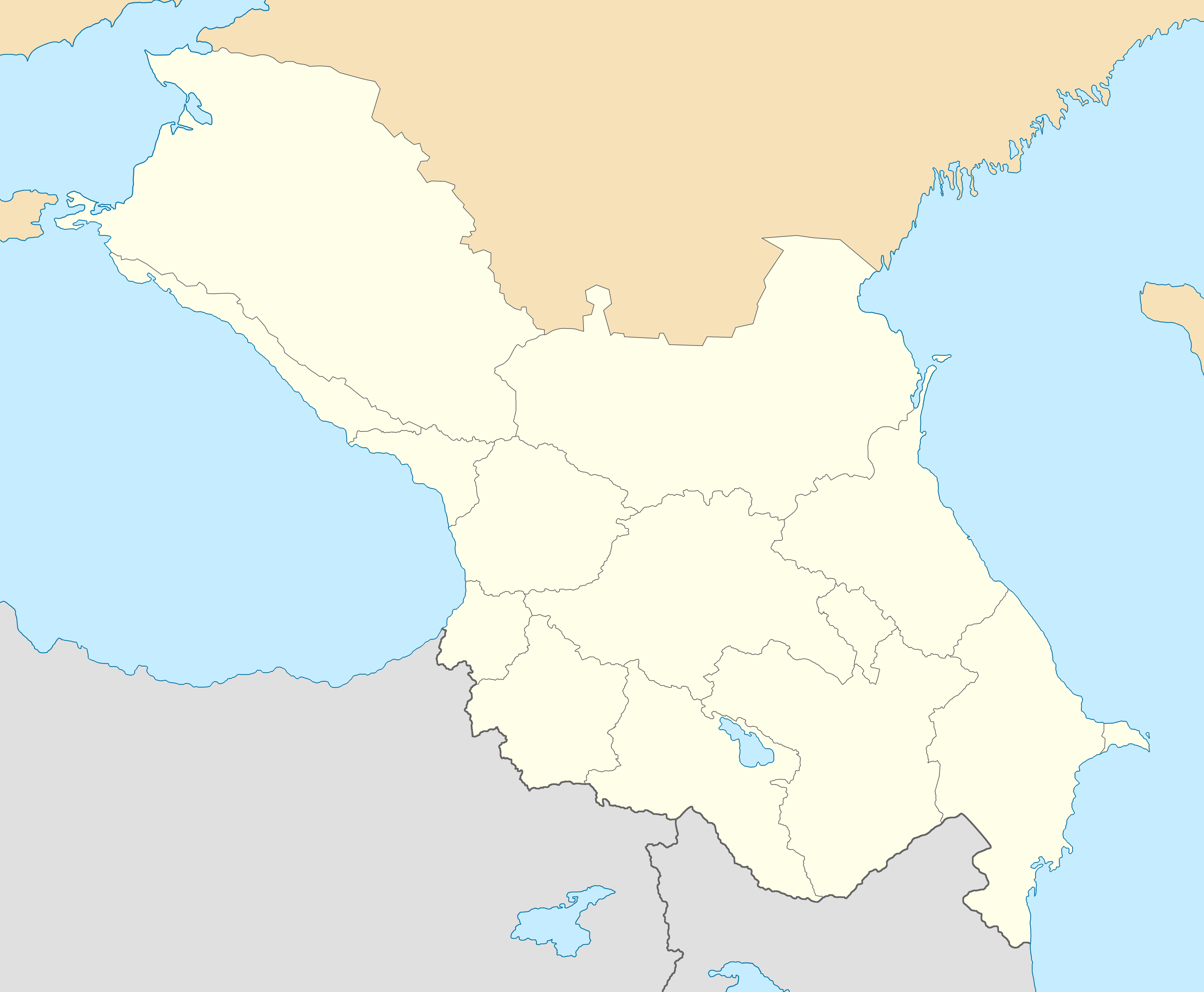
- Administrative map of the Caucasus Viceroyalty
- Country: Russian Empire
- Established: 1801
- Abolished: 1917
- Capital: Tiflis (present-day Tbilisi)

Area
  - Viceroyalty: 410,423.66 km^{2} (158,465.46 sq mi)
- Highest elevation (Mount Elbrus): 5,642 m (18,510 ft)

Population (1916)
  - Viceroyalty: 12,266,282
  - Density: 29.886878/km^{2} (77.406660/sq mi)
  - Urban: 15.97%
  - Rural: 84.03%

The Caucasus Viceroyalty (Note: Russian: Кавка́зское наме́стничество, pre-reform orthography: Кавка́зское намѣ́стничество, romanized: Kavkázskoye naméstnichestvo) was a special administrative unit of the Russian Empire located in the Caucasus region, existing from 1801 to 1917 under the governance of various administrative offices. (Note: Power was exercised through the offices of glavnoupravlyayushchiy ("high commissioner") (1801–1844, 1882–1902) and namestnik ("viceroy") (1844–1882, 1904–1917). These two terms are commonly, but imprecisely, translated into English as viceroy, which is frequently used interchangeably with governor general. More accurately, glavnoupravlyayushchiy is referred to as the High Commissioner of the Caucasus, and namestnik as Viceroy.) It included the present-day countries of Armenia, Azerbaijan and Georgia, as well as the Russian republics of Adygea, Chechnya, Dagestan, Ingushetia, Kabardino-Balkaria, Karachay-Cherkessia and North Ossetia–Alania and portions of Southern Russia (Note: The republics of Russia are administrative subdivisions of Russia, but have legal rights not held by other territories due to constitutional asymmetric federalism and are thus listed separately.) and Turkey.

Russia conquered the Caucasus in the early 19th century, beginning with the annexation of the Georgian Kingdom of Kartli-Kakheti and continuing with the Caucasian War and a series of conflicts against the Ottoman and Persian empires.

== History ==
The first time Russian authority was established over the peoples of the Caucasus was after the Russian annexation of the Kingdom of Kartli-Kakheti (eastern Georgia) in 1801. General Karl Knorring was the first person to be assigned to govern the Caucasus territory, being officially titled as the Commander-in-Chief in Georgia and Governor-General of Tiflis (present-day Tbilisi). Under his successors, notably Prince Pavel Tsitsianov, General Aleksey Yermolov, Count Ivan Paskevich, and Prince Mikhail Vorontsov, Russian Transcaucasia expanded to encompass territories acquired in a series of wars with the Ottoman Empire, the Persian Empire, and local North Caucasian peoples. The scope of its jurisdiction eventually came to include what is now Georgia, Armenia, Azerbaijan, and the North Caucasus, as well as parts of Northeastern Turkey (today the provinces of Artvin, Ardahan, Kars, and Iğdır).

Russia utilised a divide and rule strategy in the Caucasus, favouring local Christian groups (or, in the case of the Ossetians, converting them to Christianity) over Muslims. Georgians and Armenians were uniquely recognised as "culturally advanced" due to their Christian faith and often collaborated with the colonial administration in the South Caucasus, while Muslim Azerbaijanis were designated as "culturally backward" and did so less frequently. The Ossetians, who adhered to a melange of beliefs including Christian, Islamic and pagan traditions prior to Russian colonisation, were conscripted into the Imperial Russian Army, separating them from other ethnic groups in the North Caucasus. The Russian government also used Arabic as the official language of colonial administration in the North Caucasus following the defeat of Imam Shamil's Caucasian Imamate; at the time, Arabic was the lingua franca of the region's Muslim population.

Headquartered at Tiflis, the viceroys acted as de facto ambassadors to neighboring countries, commanders in chief of the armed forces, and the supreme civil authority, mostly responsible only to the Tsar. From 3 February 1845 to 23 January 1882, the viceregal authority was supervised by the Caucasus Committee as the Caucasus Krai, which consisted of representatives of the State Council and the ministries of Finances, State Domains, Justice, and Interior, as well as of members of special committees. After the 1917 February Revolution, which dispossessed Tsar Nicholas II of the Russian crown, the Viceroyalty of the Caucasus was abolished by the Russian Provisional Government on 18 March 1917, and all authority, except in the zone of the active army, was entrusted to the civil administrative body called the Special Transcaucasian Committee or Ozakom (short for Osobyy Zakavkazskiy Komitet, Особый Закавказский Комитет).

== Administrative divisions ==
Over more than a century of Russian rule in the Caucasus, the structure of the viceroyalty underwent a number of changes, with the addition or removal of administrative positions and redrawing of provincial divisions. In 1917, there were six guberniyas ("governorates"), five oblasts ("regions"), two special administrative okrugs ("districts"), and a gradonachalstvo ("municipal district") within the Caucasus Viceroyalty:

Province	Type	Russian name	Capital	Population		Size (km^{2})	Location
Province	Type	Russian name	Capital	1897	1916	Size (km^{2})	Location
Baku	Governorate	Бакинская губернія	Baku	826,716	875,746	37,948.97	
Baku	Gradonachalstvo	Бакинское градоначальство	Baku	(Note: The Baku gradonchalstvo did not exist in 1897.)	405,829	1,059.76	
Batum	Oblast	Батумская область	Batum (Batumi)	(Note: The Batum oblast was included in the Kutaisi Governorate in 1897; The population of its territory within the Kutaisi Governorate was 144,584 according to the 1897 census.)	122,811	6,975.65	
Dagestan	Oblast	Дагестанская область	Temir-Khan-Shura (Buynaksk)	571,154	713,342	29,709.63	
Elizavetpol	Governorate	Елисаветпольская губернія	Yelisavetpol (Ganja)	878,415	1,275,131	44,296.15	
Zakatal	Okrug	Закатальскій округъ	Zakataly (Zaqatala)	(Note: The Zakatal okrug was included in the Tiflis Governorate in 1897; The population of its territory within the Tiflis Governorate was 84,224 according to the 1897 census.)	92,608	3,985.77	
Kars	Oblast	Карсская область	Kars	290,654	364,214	18,739.50	
Kuban	Oblast	Кубанская область	Yekaterinodar (Krasnodar)	1,918,881	3,022,683	94,783.07	
Kutaisi	Governorate	Кутаисская губернія	Kutais (Kutaisi)	1,058,241	1,034,468	19,956.06	
Sukhumi	Okrug	Сухумскій отдѣльный округъ	Sukhum (Sukhumi)	(Note: The Sukhumi okrug was included in the Kutaisi Governorate in 1897; The population of its territory within the Kutaisi Governorate was 106,179 according to the 1897 census.)	209,671	6,591.42	
Terek	Oblast	Терская область	Vladikavkaz	933,936	1,377,923	72,443.86	
Tiflis	Governorate	Тифлисская губернія	Tiflis (Tbilisi)	1,051,032	1,473,308	40,861.03	
Black Sea	Governorate	Черноморская губернія	Novorossiysk	57,478	178,306	6,675.68	
Erivan	Governorate	Эриванская губернія	Erivan (Yerevan)	829,556	1,120,242	26,397.11	
Caucasus Viceroyalty				8,416,063	12,266,282	410,423.66	

== Demographics ==
Ethnographic map of Russian Transcaucasia, 1880.

=== Kavkazskiy kalendar ===
According to the 1917 publication of Kavkazskiy kalendar, the Caucasus Viceroyalty had a population of 12,266,282 on 14 January [O.S. 1 January] 1916, including 6,442,684 men and 5,823,598 women, 9,728,750 of whom were the permanent population, and 2,537,532 were temporary residents:

Nationality	Urban		Rural		TOTAL	
Nationality	Number	%	Number	%	Number	%
Russians	757,908	38.68	3,262,359	31.65	4,020,267	32.77
Armenians	518,164	26.45	1,341,499	13.02	1,859,663	15.16
Georgians	163,482	8.34	1,628,128	15.80	1,791,610	14.61
North Caucasians	48,722	2.49	1,469,783	14.26	1,518,505	12.38
Shia Muslims (Note: Primarily Tatars.)	221,996	11.33	1,287,495	12.49	1,509,491	12.31
Sunni Muslims (Note: Primarily Turco-Tatars.)	82,384	4.20	862,064	8.36	944,448	7.70
Asiatic Christians	38,096	1.94	170,827	1.66	208,923	1.70
Other Europeans	52,000	2.65	87,623	0.85	139,623	1.14
Kurds	3,331	0.17	93,761	0.91	97,092	0.79
Jews	66,260	3.38	26,878	0.26	93,138	0.76
Roma	1,855	0.09	40,785	0.40	42,640	0.35
Yazidis	5,117	0.26	35,765	0.35	40,882	0.33
TOTAL	1,959,315	100.00	10,306,967	100.00	12,266,282	100.00

=== Largest cities ===
	Name	Population		Governorate	Country
	Name	1897	1916	Governorate	Country
1	Tiflis (Tbilisi)	159,600	346,766	Tiflis Governorate	Georgia
2	Baku	111,900	262,422	Baku gradonachalstvo	Azerbaijan
3	Ekaterinodar (Krasnodar)	65,600	103,624	Kuban Oblast	Russia
4	Vladikavkaz	48,843	73,243	Terek Oblast	Russia, North Ossetia
5	Yeysk	35,446	44,765	Kuban Oblast	Russia
6	Maykop	33,276	54,762	Kuban Oblast	Russia, Circassia
7	Yelisavetpol (Ganja)	33,022	57,731	Yelisavetpol Governorate	Azerbaijan
8	Kutais (Kutaisi)	32,492	58,151	Kutais Governorate	Georgia
9	Alexandropol (Gyumri)	30,735	51,874	Erivan Governorate	Armenia
10	Erivan (Yerevan)	28,910	51,286	Erivan Governorate	Armenia
11	Batum (Batumi)	26,417	20,020	Kutais Governorate	Georgia
12	Shusha	25,656	43,869	Yelizavetpol Governorate	Azerbaijan
13	Kars	20,891	30,514	Kars Governorate	Turkey
14	Nukha (Shaki)	24,734	52,243	Yelizavetpol Governorate	Azerbaijan
15	Shemakha (Shamakhi)	20,007	27,732	Baku Governorate	Azerbaijan

== High commissioners and viceroys of the Caucasus ==
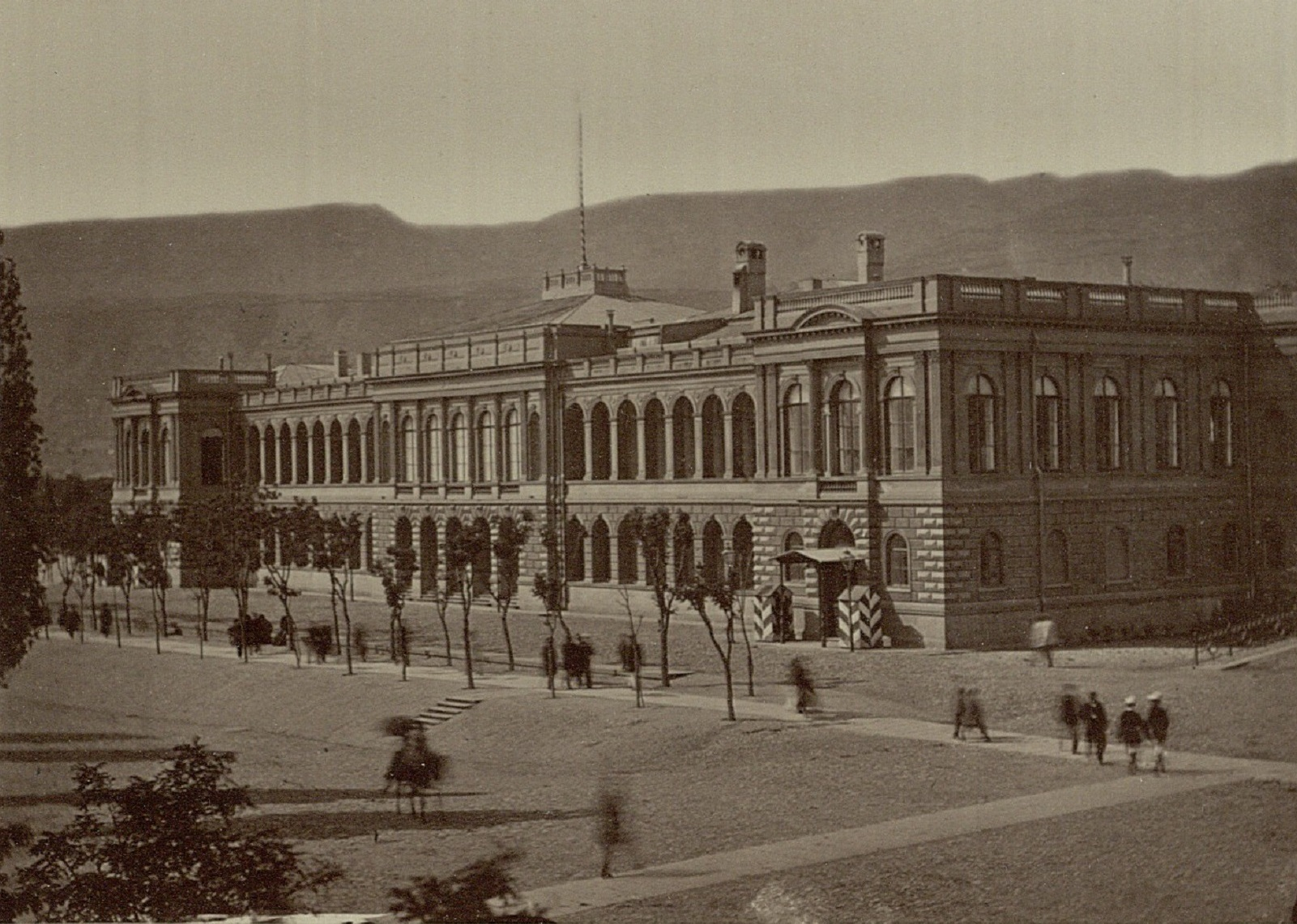
Palace of the Caucasus Viceroy in Tiflis, 1860s.

- Karl Heinrich von Knorring 1801–1802
- Pavel Tsitsianov 1802–1806
- Ivan Gudovich 1806–1809
- Alexander Tormasov 1809–1811
- Philip Paulucci 1811–1812
- Nikolay Rtishchev 1812–1816
- Aleksey Yermolov 1816–1827
- Ivan Paskevich 1827–1831
- Gregor von Rosen 1831–1838
- Yevgeny Golovin 1838–1842
- Aleksandr Neidgardt 1842–1844
- Mikhail Vorontsov 1844–1854
- Nikolay Muravyov-Karsky 1854–1856
- Aleksandr Baryatinsky 1856–1862
- Grigol Orbeliani (acting) 1862
- Grand Duke Mikhail Nikolayevich 1862–1882
- Aleksandr Dondukov-Korsakov 1882–1890
- Sergei Sheremetyev 1890–1896
- Grigory Golitsyn 1896–1904
- Yakov Malama (acting) 1904
- Illarion Vorontsov-Dashkov 1904–1916
- Grand Duke Nikolay Nikolayevich 1916–1917

== Bibliography ==
- Hovannisian, Richard G. (1971). The Republic of Armenia. Vol. 1: The First Year, 1918–1919. Berkeley: University of California Press. ISBN 978-0520019843.
- Кавказский календарь на 1917 год [Caucasian calendar for 1917] (in Russian) (72nd ed.). Tiflis: Tipografiya kantselyarii Ye.I.V. na Kavkaze, kazenny dom. 1917. Archived from the original on 4 November 2021.

== See also ==
- Caucasus Viceroyalty (1785–1796)
- Caucasus Viceroyalty (1801–1917) topics
- Viceroyalties of the Russian Empire
