= Okrug =

Administrative division in some Slavic states

An okrug (Note: English: /ˈɒkrʌɡ/; Belarusian: акруга, romanized: akruha, IPA: [ˈakruga]; Bulgarian: окръг, romanized: okrǎg, IPA: [ˈɔkrɐk]; Macedonian: округ, romanized: okrug, IPA: [ˈɔkruk]; Polish: okręg, pronounced [ˈɔkrɛŋk]; Russian: округ, romanized: okrug, IPA: [ˈokrʊk]; Serbian: округ, romanized: okrug, IPA: [ôkruːɡ]; Ukrainian: округ, romanized: okruh, IPA: [ˈɔkrʊɦ]) is a type of administrative division in some Slavic-speaking states. The word okrug is a loanword in English, alternatively translated as area, district, county, or region.

Etymologically, okrug literally means 'circuit', derived from Proto-Slavic *okrǫgъ, in turn from *ob- 'around' + *krǫgъ 'circle'. In meaning, the word is similar to the German term Bezirk or Kreis ('district') and the French word arrondissement; all of which refer to something 'encircled' or 'surrounded'.

== Kazakhstan ==
In Kazakhstan, an okrug (округ) refers to an administrative-territorial unit that operates below the district (raion) level. The term is most commonly used in the form of rural district (ауылдық округ), which encompasses one or several rural settlements (aul) administered collectively under a single local government.

Each rural okrug has an elected or appointed akim (executive head) who manages administrative affairs on behalf of the district authorities. The okrug serves as an intermediary administrative level between the district and individual auls, often responsible for local public services, infrastructure maintenance, and basic civil registration.

The use of the term "okrug" differs from other former Soviet countries where it may refer to larger administrative units; in Kazakhstan, it specifically denotes these small local government areas.

== Serbia ==
The Republic of Serbia is divided into twenty-nine okrug (pl. okruzi) as well as the City of Belgrade. The term okrug in Serbia is often translated as either district or county. The usage of okrug dates back to the early 19th century.

=== Principality of Serbia ===
In 1833 six nahiya that had been part of the First Serbian Uprising (1804–13), but remained outside Serbia following the Second Serbian Uprising (1815), were transferred to Serbia by Sultan Mahmud II. In 1834 the former Ottoman administrative units in Serbia were abolished, replaced with five serdarstvo, 19 okrug and 61 kapetanija (renamed srez in 1835).

=== Kingdom of Serbia ===
In 1890, Serbia was divided into 15 okrug (pl. okruzi) which were further divided into counties, srez (pl. srezovi). Cities of Belgrade and Niš had special administrative status. The districts were: Valjevo, Vranje, Kragujevac, Krajina, Kruševac, Morava, Pirot, Podrinje, Podunavlje, Požarevac, Rudnik, Timok, Toplica, Užice and Crna Reka. In 1900 the Podunavlje district was divided into the districts of Belgrade and Smederevo and in 1902 the district of Čačak was separated from Rudnik district.

In 1912 and 1913 Serbia enlarged its territory after victorious First Balkan War. In August 1913, 11 new districts were formed in the newly liberated areas: Bitola, Debar, Kavadarci, Novi Pazar, Kumanovo, Pljevlja, Prizren, Priština, Skopje, Tetovo and Štip. Few months later, Pljevlja and Debar districts were abolished and the new Prijepolje and Ohrid districts formed instead. A new Zvečan district was formed as well.

=== Republic of Serbia ===
The Republic of Serbia is divided into twenty-nine okrug (pl. okruzi) as well as the City of Belgrade.

Districts of the Republic of Serbia
- Bor
- Braničevo
- Central Banat
- Jablanica
- Kolubara
- Mačva
- Moravica
- Nišava
- North Bačka
- North Banat
- Pčinja
- Pirot
- Podunavlje
- Pomoravlje
- Rasina
- Raška
- South Bačka
- South Banat
- Srem
- Šumadija
- Toplica
- West Bačka
- Zaječar
- Zlatibor
- Kosovo^{a}
- Kosovo-Pomoravlje^{a}
- Kosovska Mitrovica^{a}
- Peć^{a}
- Prizren^{a}

== Former and current usage ==
=== Bulgaria ===
In Bulgaria, okrags are the abolished primary unit of the administrative division and implied "districts" or "counties". They existed in the postwar Bulgaria between 1946 and 1987 and corresponded approximately to today's oblasts.

=== Poland ===
As historical administrative subdivisions of Poland, okręgi existed in the later part of the Congress Poland period, from 1842, when the name was applied to the former powiats (the name powiat being transferred to the former obwody). See: subdivisions of Congress Poland.

Okręgi were also created temporarily from 1945 to 1946, in the areas annexed to Poland from Germany as a result of the Soviet military advance. An okręg was then subdivided into obwody. These okręgi were later replaced by voivodeships, and the obwody by powiats.

=== Russia ===
==== Imperial Russia ====
Okrugs were one of the several types of administrative division for oblasts and selected governorates in Imperial Russia. Until the 1920s, okrugs were administrative districts in Cossack hosts such as the Don Cossacks.

==== Soviet Union ====
Inherited from Imperial Russia, in the 1920s, okrugs were administrative divisions of several other primary divisions such as oblasts, krais, and others. For some time in the 1920s they also served as the primary unit upon the abolishment of guberniyas and were divided into raions. On 30 July 1930 most of the okrugs were abolished. The remaining okrugs were phased out in the Russian SFSR during 1930–1946, although they were retained in Zakarpattia Oblast of the Ukrainian SSR in a status equivalent to that of a raion.

National okrugs were first created in the Mountain ASSR of the Russian SFSR in 1921 as units of the Soviet autonomy and additional national okrugs were created in the Russian SFSR for the peoples of the north and Caucasus region. In 1977, all national okrugs were renamed autonomous okrugs.

==== Russian Federation ====
In the present-day Russian Federation, the term okrug is either translated as district or rendered directly as okrug, and is used to describe the following types of divisions:

- Federal Districts (federalny okrug), such as the Siberian Federal District
- Autonomous okrugs (avtonomny okrug), such as Chukotka Autonomous Okrug

After the series of mergers in 2005–2008, several autonomous okrugs of Russia lost their federal subject status and are now considered to be administrative territories within the federal subjects they had been merged into:

- Agin-Buryat Okrug, a territory with special status within Zabaykalsky Krai
- Komi-Permyak Okrug, a territory with special status within Perm Krai
- Koryak Okrug, a territory with special status within Kamchatka Krai
- Ust-Orda Buryat Okrug, a territory with special status within Irkutsk Oblast

Okrug is also used to describe the administrative divisions of the two "federal cities" in Russia:

- the administrative okrugs of Moscow are an upper-level administrative division
- the municipal okrugs of St. Petersburg is a lower-level administrative division

In the federal city of Sevastopol, municipal okrugs are a type of municipal formation.

In Tver Oblast, the term okrug also denotes a type of an administrative division which is equal in status to that of the districts.

Furthermore, the designation okrug denotes several selsoviet-level administrative divisions:

- okrugs, such as okrugs of Samara Oblast
- rural okrugs (selsky okrug), such as the rural okrugs of Belgorod Oblast
- rural territorial okrugs (selsky territorialny okrug), such as the rural territorial okrugs of Murmansk Oblast
- stanitsa okrugs (stanichny okrug), such as the stanitsa okrugs of Krasnodar Krai

In some cities, the term okrug is used to refer to the administrative divisions of those cities. Administrative okrugs are such divisions in the cities of Murmansk, Omsk, and Tyumen; city okrugs are used in Krasnodar; municipal okrugs are the divisions of Nazran; okrugs exist in Belgorod, Kaluga, Kursk, and Novorossiysk; and territorial okrugs are the divisions of Arkhangelsk and Lipetsk.

The term okrug is also used to describe a type of a municipal formation, the municipal urban okrug—a municipal urban settlement not incorporated into a municipal district.

== See also ==
- Administrative division
- Krai
- Military district
- Oblast

== Sources ==
- Cvijetić, Leposava (1984). Milić, Danica (ed.). "Popis 1834". Мешовита грађа [Miscellanea]. 13. Istorijski institut: 9–118.
- Petrović, Mita (1898). Finansije i ustanove obnovljene Srbije do 1842 II: Drugi ustanak, finansiranje i narodni prihodi do 1835 po originalnim dokumentima. Belgrade: Državna štamparija.
