= Kavkazskiy kalendar =

Annual almanac published in the Russian Empire

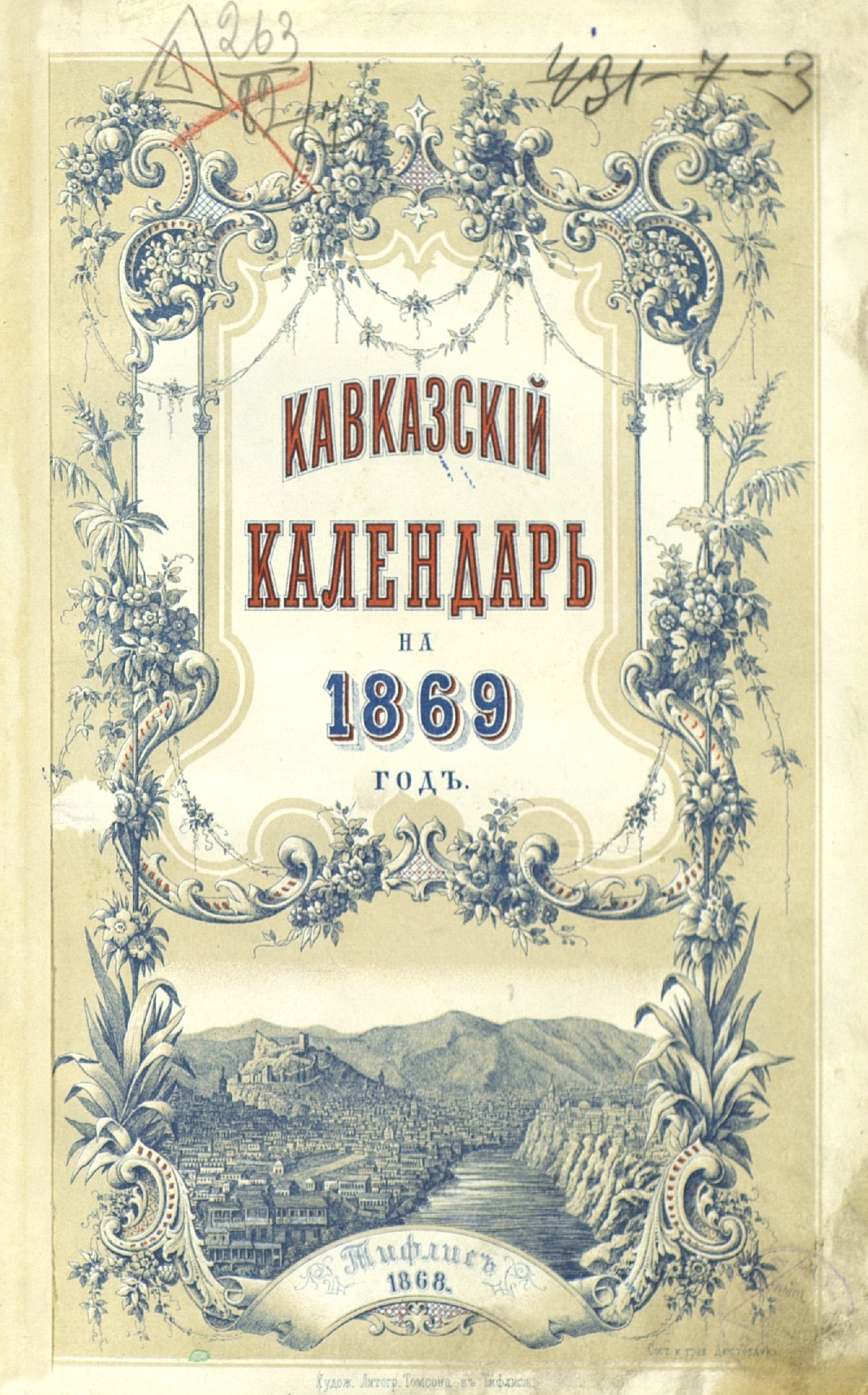
- Type: Yearly almanac
- Publisher: Office of the Viceroy of the Caucasus
- Founded: 1846
- Language: Russian
- Ceased publication: 1917
- Headquarters: Tiflis (present-day Tbilisi), Russian Empire

Kavkazskiy kalendar (Russian: Кавказский календарь, pre-reform orthography: Кавказскій календарь, lit. 'Caucasian calendar') was an annual almanac published in Tiflis (present-day Tbilisi) in the Russian Empire by the office of the Viceroy of the Caucasus from 1846 to 1917.

== History ==
Kavkazskiy kalendar contained a large number of ethnographic and historical materials. Questions of public education, agricultural crops were considered, information about the customs of the Caucasian peoples, their religions, and much more was placed. In addition, there was the so-called "Chronological indication" section, containing a chronological list of significant dates in the history of the Caucasus since ancient times. A significant place in it was also given to statistical (including data on the population of the region), reference and address information about the Caucasus region, including the Dagestan, Kuban and Terek oblasts, as well as the Black Sea and Stavropol governorates.

Kavkazskiy kalendar was used as a guide and essential reference book by travellers, explorers and various persons sent to the Caucasus. The almanac enjoyed great interest among the population. A correspondent of the newspaper Kavkaz noted:

Народ каждый год с нетерпением ожидает очередного «Кавказского календаря» (English translation: Every year the people look forward to the next edition of Kavkazskiy kalendar)

== Bibliography ==
- Bealby, John T.; Kropotkin, Peter A. (1911). "Caucasus" . In Chisholm, Hugh (ed.). Encyclopædia Britannica (11th ed.). Cambridge University Press.
- Dameniya, Irina Kh. (1994). Россия. Абхазия: Из истории культурных взаимоотношений в XIX — начале XX вв [Russia. Abkhazia: From the history of cultural relations in the XIX - early XX centuries.] (in Russian). Saint Petersburg: Znaniye. ISBN 5-7320-0442-4.
- Gadzhiyev, Akhmedsharip M. (2006). Антиколониальное движение горцев Дагестана во второй половине XIX в. [Anti-colonial movement of the highlanders of Dagestan in the second half of the XIX century.] (in Russian). Makhachkala: Institute of History, Archeology and Ethnography DSC RAS.
- Ismail-Zade, Delyara I. (1991). Население городов Закавказского края в XIX — начале XX в.: историко-демографический анализ [Population of the cities of the Transcaucasian region in the 19th – early 20th centuries: historical and demographic analysis] (in Russian). Nauka. ISBN 9785020085725.
- "Кавказские календари" [Caucasian calendars]. Don State Public Library (in Russian). Archived from the original on 27 September 2020.
- Kovsen, Mark O. (1955). Кавказский этнографический сборник [Caucasian ethnographic collection] (in Russian). USSR Academy of Sciences Publishing House.
