= List of viceroyalties of the Russian Empire =

This is a list of viceroyalties (namestnichestvo) of the Russian Empire.

== Under Catherine II ==
| label | capital | dates |
|---|---|---|
| Arkhangelsk Viceroyalty | Arkhangelsk | 1784–1796 |
| Bratslav Viceroyalty | Bratslav | 1793–1796 |
| Caucasus Viceroyalty | Yekaterinograd | 1785–1796 |
| Chernigov Viceroyalty | Chernihiv | 1781–1796 |
| Courland Viceroyalty | Mitau (now Jelgava) | 1795–1796 |
| Irkutsk Viceroyalty | Irkutsk | 1783–1796 |
| Izyaslav Viceroyalty | Izyaslav | 1793–1795 |
| Kaluga Viceroyalty | Kaluga | 1776–1796 |
| Kharkov Viceroyalty | Kharkiv | 1781–1796 |
| Kiev Viceroyalty | Kiev | 1781–1796 |
| Kolyvan Viceroyalty | Kolyvan (now Berdsk) | 1782–1796 |
| Kostroma Viceroyalty | Kostroma | 1778–1796 |
| Kursk Viceroyalty | Kursk | 1779–1796 |
| Minsk Viceroyalty | Minsk | 1795–1796 |
| Mogilev Viceroyalty | Mogilev | 1778–1796 |
| Nizhny Novgorod Viceroyalty | Nizhny Novgorod | 1779–1796 |
| Novgorod Viceroyalty | Novgorod | 1776–1796 |
| Novgorod-Seversk Viceroyalty | Novhorod-Siverskyi | 1781–1796 |
| Olonets Viceroyalty | Olonets | 1784–1796 |
| Oryol Viceroyalty | Oryol | 1778–1796 |
| Penza Viceroyalty | Penza | 1780–1796 |
| Perm Viceroyalty | Perm | 1781—1796 |
| Podolia Viceroyalty | Kamianets-Podilskyi | 1795–1796 |
| Polotsk Viceroyalty | Polotsk | 1777–1796 |
| Pskov Viceroyalty | Pskov | 1777–1796 |
| Reval Viceroyalty | Reval (now Tallinn) | 1783–1796 |
| Riga Viceroyalty | Riga | 1783–1796 |
| Ryazan Viceroyalty | Ryazan | 1778–1796 |
| Saratov Viceroyalty | Saratov | 1781–1796 |
| Simbirsk Viceroyalty | Simbirsk (now Ulyanovsk) | 1780–1796 |
| Slonim Viceroyalty | Slonim | 1796 |
| Smolensk Viceroyalty | Smolensk | 1775–1796 |
| Tambov Viceroyalty | Tambov | 1779–1796 |
| Tobolsk Viceroyalty | Tobolsk | 1782–1796 |
| Tula Viceroyalty | Tula | 1777–1796 |
| Tver Viceroyalty | Tver | 1775–1796 |
| Ufa Viceroyalty | Ufa | 1781–1796 |
| Vladimir Viceroyalty | Vladimir | 1778–1796 |
| Vilna Viceroyalty | Vilna (now Vilnius) | 1795–1796 |
| Volhynian Viceroyalty | Novohrad-Volynskyi | 1795–1796 |
| Vologda Viceroyalty | Vologda | 1780–1796 |
| Voronezh Viceroyalty | Voronezh | 1779–1796 |
| Voznesensk Viceroyalty | Voznesensk | 1795–1796 |
| Vyatka Viceroyalty | Vyatka (now Kirov) | 1780–1796 |
| Vyborg Viceroyalty | Vyborg | 1783–1796 |
| Yaroslavl Viceroyalty | Yaroslavl | 1777–1796 |
| Yekaterinoslav Viceroyalty | Kremenchuk (1783); Dnipro (1789) | 1783–1796 |

== Later ==
| label | capital | dates |
|---|---|---|
| Caucasus Viceroyalty | Tiflis | 1844–1882, 1904–1917 |
| Far Eastern Viceroyalty | | 1903–1905 |
