= Lechkhumi uezd =

Coordinates: 42°38′50″N 42°46′12″E

Lechkhumi uezd Лечхумскій уѣздъ
- Uezd
- Coat of arms

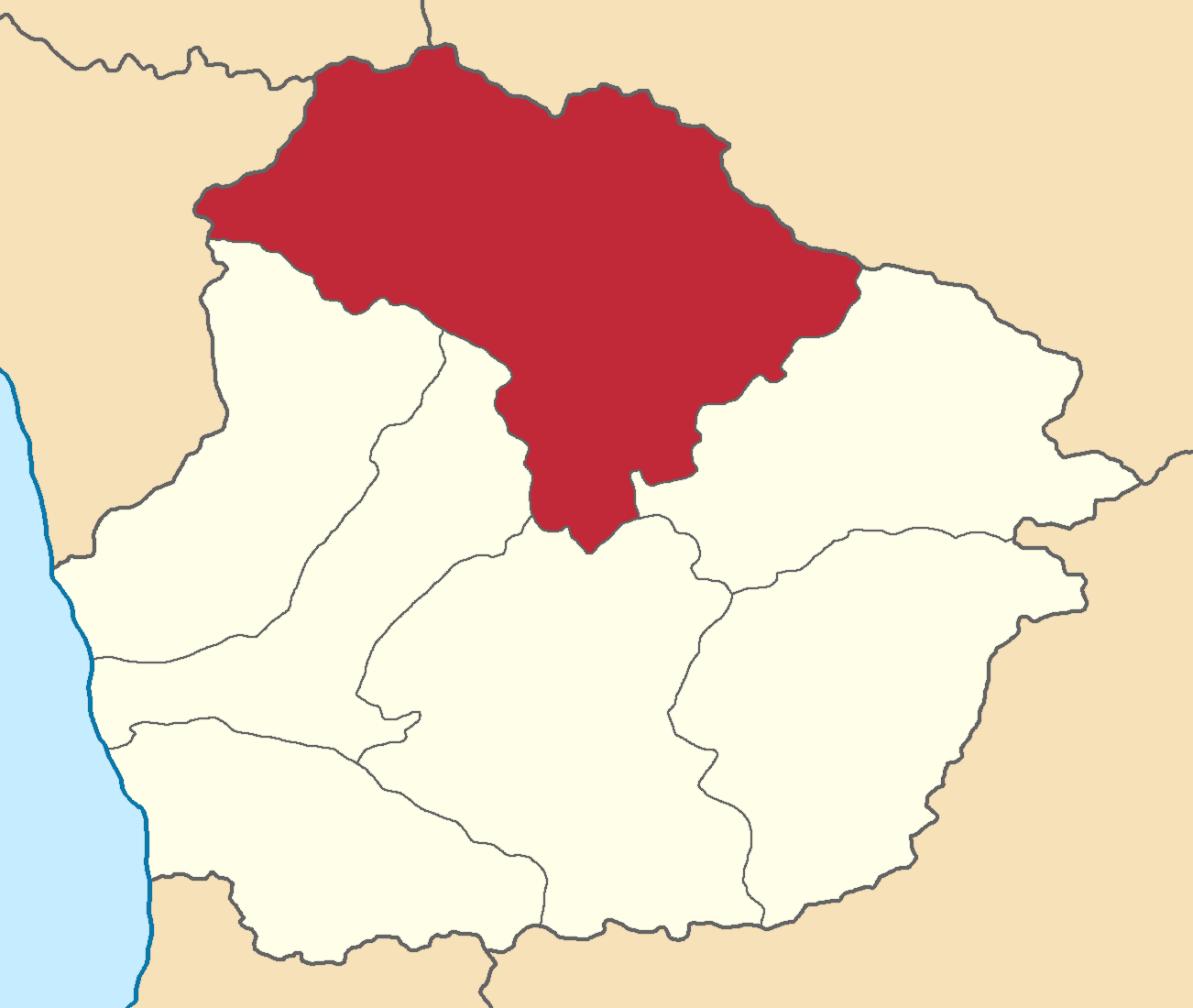
- Location in the Kutais Governorate
- Country: Russian Empire
- Viceroyalty: Caucasus
- Governorate: Kutaisi
- Established: 1867
- Abolished: 1930
- Capital: Tsageri

Area
  - Total: 4,873.05 km^{2} (1,881.50 sq mi)

Population (1916)
  - Total: 61,914
  - Density: 12.705/km^{2} (32.907/sq mi)
  - Rural: 100.00%

The Lechkhumi uezd (Note: Russian: Лечху́мскій уѣ́здъ, romanized: Lechkhúmsky uyézd; Georgian: ლეჩხუმის მაზრა, romanized: lechkhumis mazra) was a county (uezd) of the Kutaisi Governorate of the Caucasus Viceroyalty of the Russian Empire. It bordered the Terek and Kuban oblasts to the north, the Sukhumi Okrug to the west, the Zugdidi, Senaki, and Kutais uezds to the south and the Racha uezd to the east. The area of the uezd corresponded to most of the contemporary Samegrelo-Zemo Svaneti region of Georgia. The administrative center of the Lechkhumi uezd was the town of Tsageri.

== History ==
The Lechkhumi uezd was formed in 1867 as part of the Kutaisi Governorate in the territory during the time of the Russian Empire. In 1918, the Kutaisi Governorate including the Lechkhumi uezd was incorporated into the Democratic Republic of Georgia.

== Administrative divisions ==
The subcounties (uchastoks) of the Lechkhumi uezd in 1913 were as follows:

Name	1912 population	Area
Alpanskiy uchastok (Алпанскій участокъ)	22,791	449.41 square versts (511.46 km^{2}; 197.47 mi^{2})
Svanetskiy uchastok (Сванетскій участокъ)	12,184	2,383.37 square versts (2,712.42 km^{2}; 1,047.27 mi^{2})
Tsagerskiy uchastok (Цагерскій участокъ)	23,264	1,449.10 square versts (1,649.17 km^{2}; 636.75 mi^{2})

== Demographics ==
=== Russian Empire Census ===
According to the Russian Empire Census, the Lechkhumi uezd had a population of 47,779 on 28 January [O.S. 15 January] 1897, including 23,522 men and 24,257 women. The majority of the population indicated Imeretian to be their mother tongue, with a significant Svan speaking minority.

Linguistic composition of the Lechkhumi uezd in 1897
Language	Native speakers	%
Imeretian	31,520	65.97
Svan	15,359	32.15
Jewish	441	0.92
Georgian	226	0.47
Armenian	91	0.19
Mingrelian	60	0.13
Russian	26	0.05
Ossetian	9	0.02
Kurdish	6	0.01
Avar-Andean	4	0.01
Tatar (Note: Before 1918, Azerbaijanis were generally known as "Tatars". This term, employed by the Russians, referred to Turkic-speaking Muslims of the South Caucasus. After 1918, with the establishment of the Azerbaijan Democratic Republic and "especially during the Soviet era", the Tatar group identified itself as "Azerbaijani".)	4	0.01
Ukrainian	2	0.00
Persian	2	0.00
Other	29	0.06
TOTAL	47,779	100.00

=== Kavkazskiy kalendar ===
According to the 1917 publication of Kavkazskiy kalendar, the Lechkhumi uezd had a population of 61,914 on 14 January [O.S. 1 January] 1916, including 32,691 men and 29,223 women, 60,945 of whom were the permanent population, and 969 were temporary residents:

Nationality	Number	%
Georgians	60,407	97.57
Jews	1,372	2.22
Armenians	96	0.16
Other Europeans	25	0.04
Russians	14	0.02
TOTAL	61,914	100.00

== Bibliography ==
- Bournoutian, George A. (2018). Armenia and Imperial Decline: The Yerevan Province, 1900–1914. Milton Park, Abingdon, Oxon: Routledge. ISBN 978-1-351-06260-2. OCLC 1037283914.
- Hovannisian, Richard G. (1971). The Republic of Armenia. Vol. 1: The First Year, 1918–1919. Berkeley: University of California Press. ISBN 978-0520019843.
- Кавказский календарь на 1913 год [Caucasian calendar for 1913] (in Russian) (68th ed.). Tiflis: Tipografiya kantselyarii Ye.I.V. na Kavkaze, kazenny dom. 1913. Archived from the original on 19 April 2022.
- Кавказский календарь на 1917 год [Caucasian calendar for 1917] (in Russian) (72nd ed.). Tiflis: Tipografiya kantselyarii Ye.I.V. na Kavkaze, kazenny dom. 1917. Archived from the original on 4 November 2021.
- Tsutsiev, Arthur (2014). Atlas of the Ethno-Political History of the Caucasus (PDF). Translated by Nora Seligman Favorov. New Haven: Yale University Press. ISBN 9780300153088. Archived (PDF) from the original on 17 June 2023.
