= Zugdidi uezd =

Coordinates: 42°30′38″N 41°51′22″E

Zugdidi uezd Зугдидскій уѣздъ
- Uezd
- Coat of arms

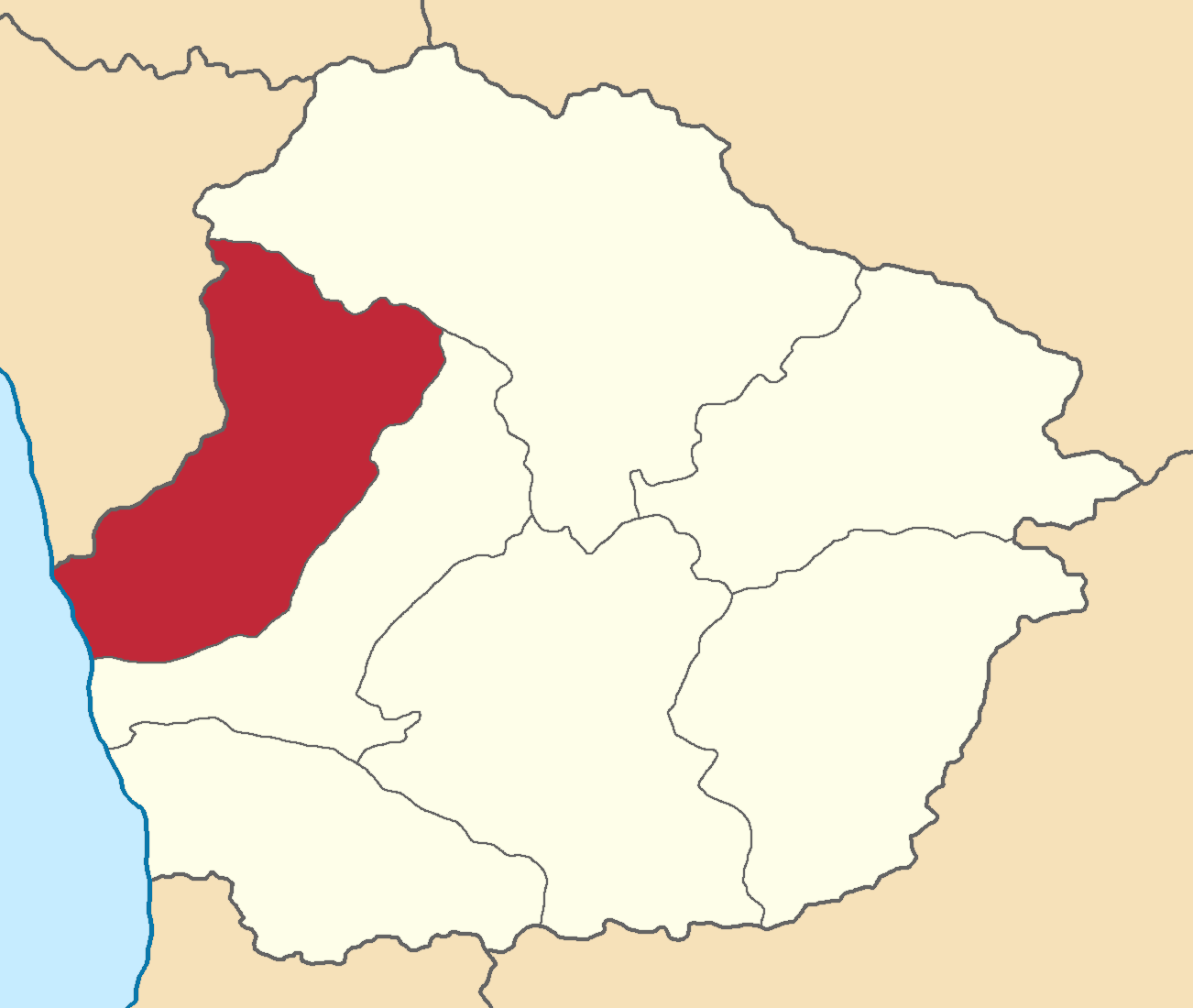
- Location in the Kutaisi Governorate
- Country: Russian Empire
- Viceroyalty: Caucasus
- Governorate: Kutaisi
- Established: 1867
- Abolished: 1930
- Capital: Zugdidi

Area
  - Total: 2,670.38 km^{2} (1,031.04 sq mi)

Population (1916)
  - Total: 127,978
  - Density: 47.9250/km^{2} (124.125/sq mi)
  - Rural: 100.00%

The Zugdidi uezd (Note: Russian: Зугди́дскій уѣ́здъ, romanized: Zugdídsky uyézd; Georgian: ზუგდიდის მაზრა, romanized: zugdidis mazra) was a county (uezd) of the Kutaisi Governorate of the Caucasus Viceroyalty of the Russian Empire. It bordered the Sukhumi Okrug to the north, the Lechkhumi uezd to the east, the Senaki uezd to the south, and the Black Sea to the west. The area of the Zugdidi uezd corresponded to most of the contemporary Samegrelo-Zemo Svaneti region of Georgia. The county was eponymously named for its administrative center, Zugdidi.

== History ==
The Zugdidi uezd was formed in 1867 as part of the Kutaisi Governorate on the territory during the time of the Russian Empire. In 1918, the Kutaisi Governorate including the Zugdidi uezd was incorporated into the Democratic Republic of Georgia.

== Administrative divisions ==
The subcounties (uchastoks) of the Zugdidi uezd in 1913 were as follows:

Name	1912 population	Area
Zugdidskiy uchastok (Зугдидскій участокъ)	40,872	504.86 square versts (574.56 km^{2}; 221.84 mi^{2})
Redut-Kalskiy uchastok (Редут-Кальскій участокъ)	33,881	520.04 square versts (591.84 km^{2}; 228.51 mi^{2})
Tsalendzhikhskiy uchastok (Цаленджихскій участокъ)	47,806	1,321.53 square versts (1,503.98 km^{2}; 580.69 mi^{2})

== Demographics ==
=== Russian Empire Census ===
According to the Russian Empire Census, the Zugdidi uezd had a population of 114,869 on 28 January [O.S. 15 January] 1897, including 58,043 men and 56,826 women. The majority of the population indicated Mingrelian to be their mother tongue, with a significant Georgian speaking minority.

Linguistic composition of the Zugdidi uezd in 1897
Language	Native speakers	%
Mingrelian	113,034	98.40
Georgian	1,060	0.92
Imeretian	280	0.24
Turkish	155	0.13
Russian	121	0.11
Greek	45	0.04
Svan	42	0.04
Ukrainian	18	0.02
Tatar (Note: Before 1918, Azerbaijanis were generally known as "Tatars". This term, employed by the Russians, referred to Turkic-speaking Muslims of the South Caucasus. After 1918, with the establishment of the Azerbaijan Democratic Republic and "especially during the Soviet era", the Tatar group identified itself as "Azerbaijani".)	17	0.01
Avar-Andean	11	0.01
Armenian	10	0.01
Polish	8	0.01
German	8	0.01
Abkhaz	8	0.01
Ossetian	7	0.01
Romanian	6	0.01
Jewish	3	0.00
Lithuanian	1	0.00
English	1	0.00
Persian	1	0.00
Estonian	1	0.00
Other	32	0.03
TOTAL	114,869	100.00

=== Kavkazskiy kalendar ===
According to the 1917 publication of Kavkazskiy kalendar, the Zugdidi uezd had a population of 127,978 on 14 January [O.S. 1 January] 1916, including 65,001 men and 62,977 women, 127,805 of whom were the permanent population, and 173 were temporary residents:

Nationality	Number	%
Georgians	127,861	99.91
Russians	94	0.07
Sunni Muslims (Note: Primarily Turco-Tatars.)	17	0.01
Armenians	3	0.00
Other Europeans	3	0.00
TOTAL	127,978	100.00

== Bibliography ==
- Bournoutian, George A. (2018). Armenia and Imperial Decline: The Yerevan Province, 1900–1914. Milton Park, Abingdon, Oxon: Routledge. ISBN 978-1-351-06260-2. OCLC 1037283914.
- Hovannisian, Richard G. (1971). The Republic of Armenia. Vol. 1: The First Year, 1918–1919. Berkeley: University of California Press. ISBN 978-0520019843.
- Кавказский календарь на 1913 год [Caucasian calendar for 1913] (in Russian) (68th ed.). Tiflis: Tipografiya kantselyarii Ye.I.V. na Kavkaze, kazenny dom. 1913. Archived from the original on 19 April 2022.
- Кавказский календарь на 1917 год [Caucasian calendar for 1917] (in Russian) (72nd ed.). Tiflis: Tipografiya kantselyarii Ye.I.V. na Kavkaze, kazenny dom. 1917. Archived from the original on 4 November 2021.
- Tsutsiev, Arthur (2014). Atlas of the Ethno-Political History of the Caucasus (PDF). Translated by Nora Seligman Favorov. New Haven: Yale University Press. ISBN 9780300153088. Archived (PDF) from the original on 17 June 2023.
