= Sukhumi okrug =

Coordinates: 43°00′15″N 41°02′34″E

Sukhumi okrug Сухумскій отдѣльный округъ
- Okrug
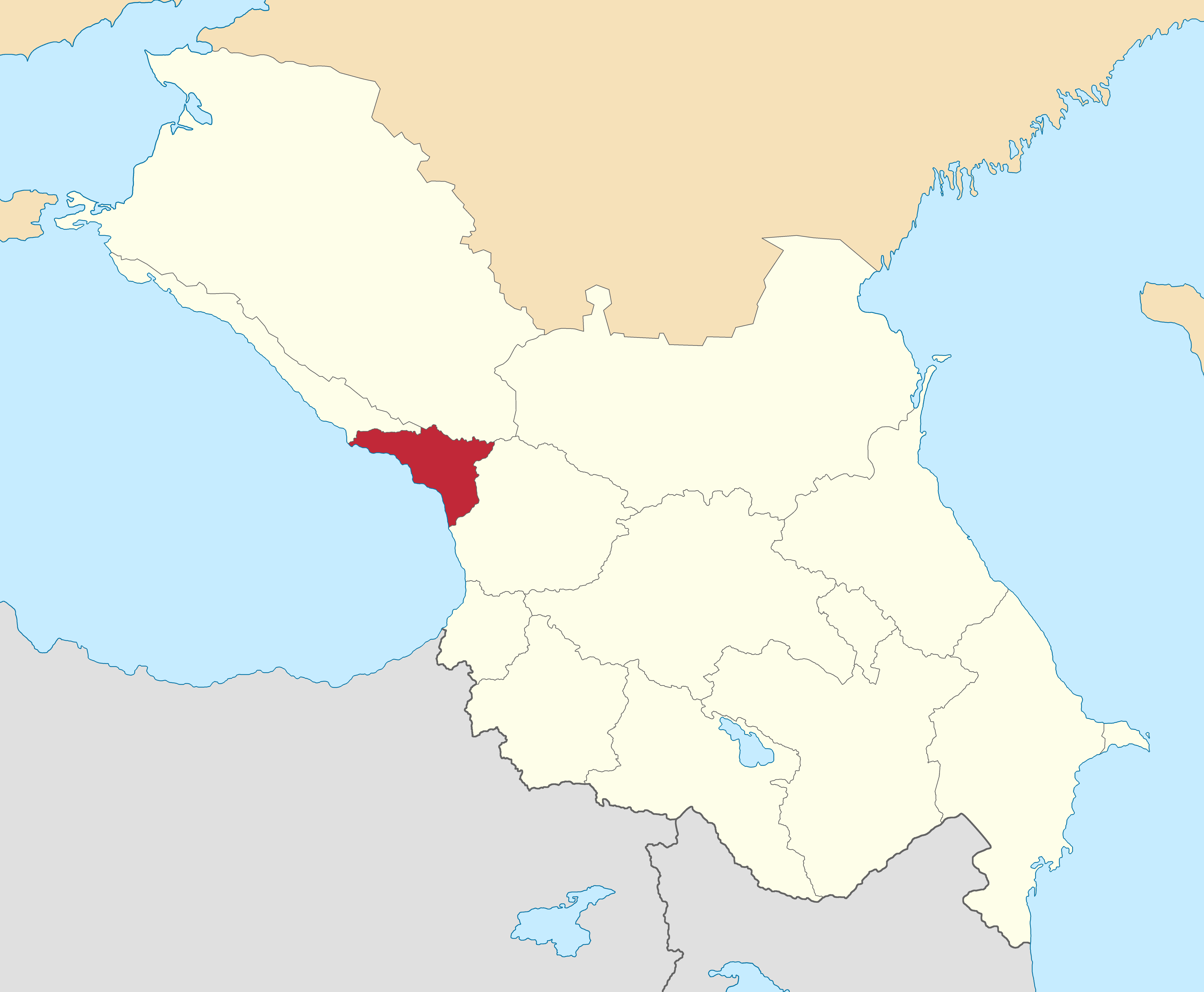
- The Sukhumi okrug in the Caucasus Viceroyalty
- Country: Russian Empire
- Viceroyalty: Caucasus
- Established: 1883
- Abolished: 1921
- Capital: Sukhum (present-day Sukhumi)

Area
  - Total: 6,591.42 km^{2} (2,544.96 sq mi)

Population (1916)
  - Total: 209,671
  - Density: 31.8097/km^{2} (82.3867/sq mi)
  - Urban: 29.56%
  - Rural: 70.44%

The Sukhumi or Sukhum okrug (Note: Russian: Суху́мскій отдѣ́льный о́кругъ, romanized: Sukhúmsky otdélny ókrug; Georgian: სოხუმის ოკრუგი, romanized: sokhumis ok'rugi; Abkhaz: Акалакь Аҟәа) was a special administrative district (okrug) in the Caucasus Viceroyalty of the Russian Empire, part of the Kutaisi Governorate from 1883 until 1905. The administrative center of the district was the Black Sea port city of Sukhum (present-day Sukhumi). The okrug bordered the Kutaisi Governorate to the southwest, the Kuban Oblast to the north and the Black Sea Governorate to the northwest and in terms of its area corresponded to most of contemporary Abkhazia. During 1905–1917, the Sukhumi okrug was one of the smallest independent (not part of any province or region) administrative units of the Russian Empire, second to the Zakatal okrug.

== History ==
In the 19th century, the territory of the Sukhumi okrug, some 6,942 square versts (7,900 square kilometres) containing 79,195 inhabitants, consisted of the Principality of Abkhazia (abolished in 1864) and the communities of Tsebelda, Samurzakan, and Pskhu community. In 1864–1866, the military district of Sukhumi was made up of the okrugs of Abkhaz, Bzyb, and Abzhua and pristavstvos of Tsebelda and Samurzakan. In 1883, the district was transformed into an okrug and incorporated into the Kutaisi Governorate. In 1905, the Sukhumi okrug was separated from the Kutaisi Governorate to be directly administered by the Viceroy of the Caucasus.

In April–May 1918, Georgian forces of the Transcaucasian Democratic Federative Republic prevented Soviet forces from taking the district. In June 1918, as a result of an agreement between the authorities of the Georgian Democratic Republic and the Abkhaz People's Council, the Georgian army occupied the district as well as the adjacent Sochi and Tuapse okrugs—the Georgian government aimed to "present the Volunteer Army with a fait accompli", using historical justifications for incorporating these districts.

As result of attempts by Anton Denikin to conquer the district in 1919 during the Sochi conflict, a neutralised bufferzone was imposed north of the district in the Sochinsky okrug, between the Mekhadiri and Psou rivers. According to the Treaty of Moscow (1920), the Georgia–Russia border in Abkhazia was "traced along the Psou" rather than the Bzyb (further south) which had been the boundary of the Sukhumi okrug. The 1921 constitution of Georgia guaranteed Abkhazia the autonomy for managing its internal affairs. The constitution was proclaimed after the Red Army invasion of Georgia in February 1921; the nature of the promised autonomy was never determined.

== Administrative divisions ==
The subcounties (uchastoks) of the Sukhumi okrug in 1912 were as follows:

Name	1912 population	Area
Gudautskiy uchastok (Гудаутский участок)	24,107	869.53 square versts (989.58 km^{2}; 382.08 mi^{2})
Gumistinskiy uchastok (Гумистинский участок)	10,210	2,897.89 square versts (3,297.98 km^{2}; 1,273.36 mi^{2})
Kodorskiy uchastok (Кодорский участок)	20,808	887.85 square versts (1,010.43 km^{2}; 390.13 mi^{2})
Samurzakanskiy uchastok (Самурзаканский участок)	34,617	1,136.52 square versts (1,293.43 km^{2}; 499.40 mi^{2})

== Demographics ==
=== Russian Empire Census ===
According to the Russian Empire Census, the Sukhumi okrug had a population of 106,179 on 28 January [O.S. 15 January] 1897, including 59,836 men and 46,343 women. The majority of the population indicated Abkhazian to be their mother tongue, with significant Mingrelian, Armenian, Greek, and Russian speaking minorities.

Linguistic composition of the Sukhumi okrug in 1897
Language	Native speakers	%
Abkhazian	58,697	55.28
Mingrelian	23,810	22.42
Armenian	6,552	6.17
Greek	5,393	5.08
Russian	5,135	4.84
Georgian	1,830	1.72
Turkish	1,347	1.27
Ukrainian	809	0.76
Estonian	604	0.57
German	406	0.38
Polish	234	0.22
Persian	186	0.18
Tatar (Note: Before 1918, Azerbaijanis were generally known as "Tatars". This term, employed by the Russians, referred to Turkic-speaking Muslims of the South Caucasus. After 1918, with the establishment of the Azerbaijan Democratic Republic and "especially during the Soviet era", the Tatar group identified itself as "Azerbaijani".)	171	0.16
Imeretian	141	0.13
Jewish	136	0.13
Romanian	133	0.13
Svan	92	0.09
Lithuanian	72	0.07
Belarusian	67	0.06
Avar-Andean	26	0.02
Ossetian	11	0.01
English	6	0.01
Kurdish	2	0.00
Kazi-Kumukh	1	0.00
Other	318	0.30
TOTAL	106,179	100.00

=== Kavkazskiy kalendar ===
According to the 1917 publication of Kavkazskiy kalendar, the Sukhumi okrug had a population of 209,671 on 14 January [O.S. 1 January] 1916, including 127,619 men and 82,052 women, 135,838 of whom were the permanent population, and 73,833 were temporary residents.

Nationality	Urban		Rural		TOTAL	
Nationality	Number	%	Number	%	Number	%
Asiatic Christians	4,700	7.58	98,464	66.67	103,164	49.20
Georgians	25,156	40.59	25,227	17.08	50,383	24.03
Russians	18,890	30.48	6,585	4.46	25,475	12.15
Armenians	8,250	13.31	12,493	8.46	20,743	9.89
Other Europeans	1,720	2.78	4,928	3.34	6,648	3.17
Sunni Muslims (Note: Primarily Turco-Tatars.)	2,390	3.86	0	0.00	2,390	1.14
North Caucasians	399	0.64	0	0.00	399	0.19
Jews	250	0.40	0	0.00	250	0.12
Shia Muslims (Note: Primarily Tatars.)	219	0.35	0	0.00	219	0.10
TOTAL	61,974	100.00	147,697	100.00	209,671	100.00

== Bibliography ==
- Bournoutian, George A. (2018). Armenia and Imperial Decline: The Yerevan Province, 1900–1914. Milton Park, Abingdon, Oxon: Routledge. ISBN 978-1-351-06260-2. OCLC 1037283914.
- Hovannisian, Richard G. (1971). The Republic of Armenia. Vol. 1: The First Year, 1918–1919. Berkeley: University of California Press. ISBN 978-0520019843.
- Кавказский календарь на 1913 год [Caucasian calendar for 1913] (in Russian) (68th ed.). Tiflis: Tipografiya kantselyarii Ye.I.V. na Kavkaze, kazenny dom. 1913. Archived from the original on 19 April 2022.
- Кавказский календарь на 1917 год [Caucasian calendar for 1917] (in Russian) (72nd ed.). Tiflis: Tipografiya kantselyarii Ye.I.V. na Kavkaze, kazenny dom. 1917. Archived from the original on 4 November 2021.
- Tsutsiev, Arthur (2014). Atlas of the Ethno-Political History of the Caucasus (PDF). Translated by Nora Seligman Favorov. New Haven: Yale University Press. ISBN 9780300153088. Archived (PDF) from the original on 17 June 2023.
- Welt, Cory (2012), "A Fateful Moment: Ethnic Autonomy and Revolutionary Violence in the Democratic Republic of Georgia (1918–1921)", in Jones, Stephen F. (ed.), The Making of Modern Georgia, 1918–2012: The first Georgian Republic and its successors, New York City: Routledge, pp. 205–231, ISBN 978-0-41-559238-3
