= Racha uezd =

Coordinates: 42°35′02″N 43°26′30″E

Racha uezd Рачинскій уѣздъ
- Uezd
- Coat of arms

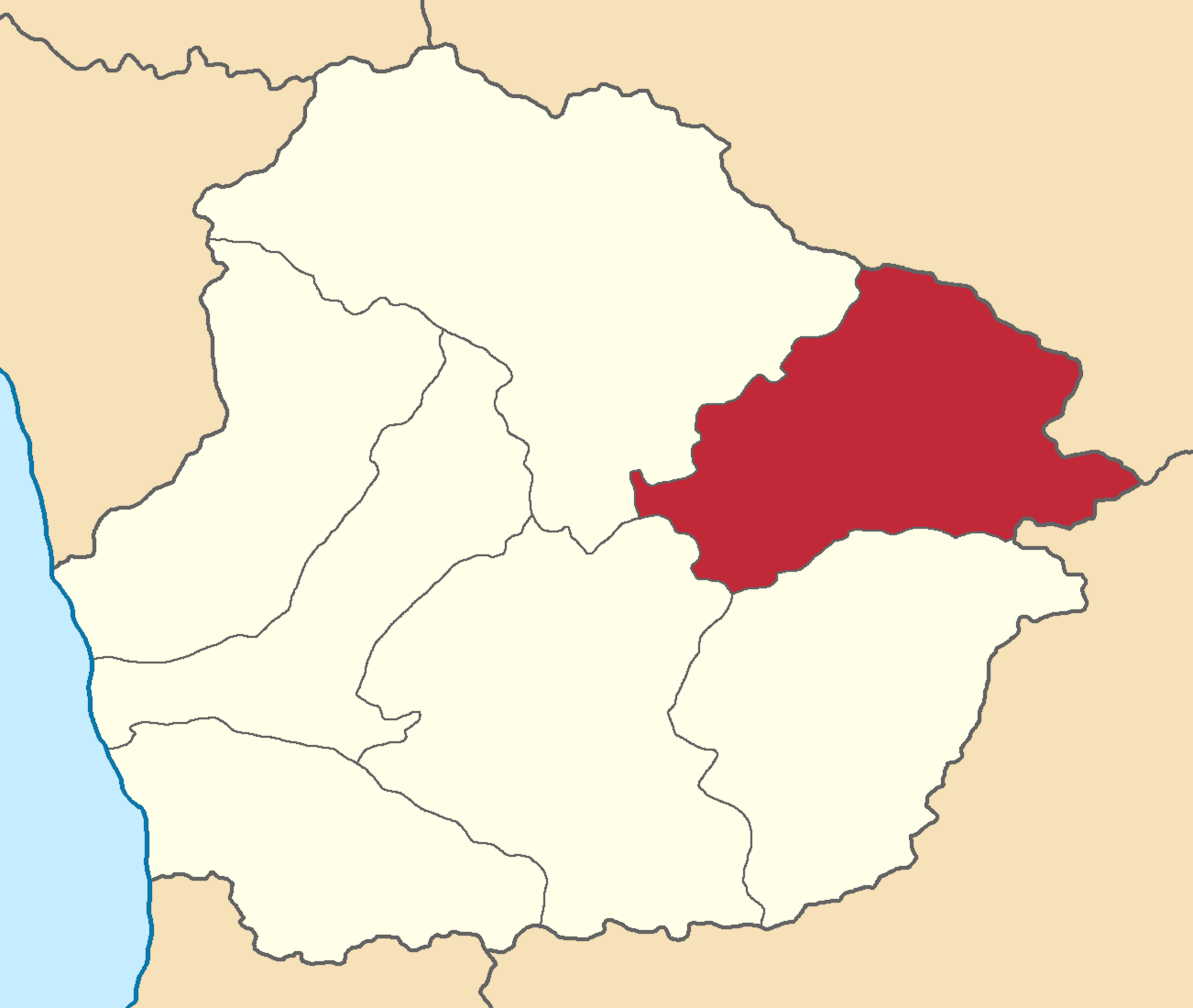
- Location in the Kutais Governorate
- Country: Russian Empire
- Viceroyalty: Kutaisi
- Governorate: Caucasus
- Established: 1846
- Abolished: 1930
- Capital: Oni

Area
  - Total: 2,818.50 km^{2} (1,088.23 sq mi)

Population (1916)
  - Total: 88,162
  - Density: 31.280/km^{2} (81.014/sq mi)
  - Rural: 100.00%

The Racha uezd (Note: Russian: Рачи́нскій уѣ́здъ, romanized: Rachínsky uyézd; Georgian: რაჭის მაზრა, romanized: rach'is mazra) was a county (uezd) of the Kutaisi Governorate of the Caucasus Viceroyalty of the Russian Empire. It bordered the Terek Oblast to the north, the Lechkhumi uezd to the west, the Kutaisi and Shorapani uezds to the south, and the Gori uezd of the Tiflis Governorate to the east. The area of the uezd corresponded to most of the contemporary Racha-Lechkhumi and Kvemo Svaneti region of Georgia. The administrative centre of the Racha uezd was Oni.

== History ==
The Racha uezd was formed in 1846 as part of the Kutaisi Governorate on the territory of the historical region of Racha during the time of the Russian Empire. In 1918, the Kutaisi Governorate including the Racha uezd was incorporated into the Democratic Republic of Georgia.

== Administrative divisions ==
The subcounties (uchastoks) of the Racha uezd in 1913 were as follows:

Name	1912 population	Area
Ambrolaurskiy uchastok (Амбролаурскій участокъ)	41,638	934.28 square versts (1,063.27 km^{2}; 410.53 mi^{2})
Onskiy uchastok (Онскій участокъ)	45,374	1,542.30 square versts (1,755.23 km^{2}; 677.70 mi^{2})

== Demographics ==
=== Russian Empire Census ===
According to the Russian Empire Census, the Zugdidi uezd had a population of 114,869 on 28 January [O.S. 15 January] 1897, including 58,043 men and 56,826 women. The majority of the population indicated Imeretian to be their mother tongue, with significant Georgian and Ossetian speaking minorities.

Linguistic composition of the Racha uezd in 1897
Language	Native speakers	%
Imeretian	44,652	73.90
Georgian	11,260	18.64
Ossetian	3,514	5.82
Jewish	609	1.01
Armenian	173	0.29
Mingrelian	93	0.15
Russian	50	0.08
Ukrainian	14	0.02
Greek	13	0.02
Avar-Andean	7	0.01
Polish	5	0.01
Svan	5	0.01
Abkhaz	2	0.00
German	1	0.00
Romanian	1	0.00
Other	22	0.04
TOTAL	60,421	100.00

=== Kavkazskiy kalendar ===
According to the 1917 publication of Kavkazskiy kalendar, the Racha uezd had a population of 88,162 on 14 January [O.S. 1 January] 1916, including 44,741 men and 43,421 women, 88,074 of whom were the permanent population, and 88 were temporary residents:

Nationality	Number	%
Georgians	88,065	99.89
Armenians	97	0.11
TOTAL	88,162	100.00

== Bibliography ==
- Bournoutian, George A. (2018). Armenia and Imperial Decline: The Yerevan Province, 1900–1914. Milton Park, Abingdon, Oxon: Routledge. ISBN 978-1-351-06260-2. OCLC 1037283914.
- Hovannisian, Richard G. (1971). The Republic of Armenia. Vol. 1: The First Year, 1918–1919. Berkeley: University of California Press. ISBN 978-0520019843.
- Кавказский календарь на 1913 год [Caucasian calendar for 1913] (in Russian) (68th ed.). Tiflis: Tipografiya kantselyarii Ye.I.V. na Kavkaze, kazenny dom. 1913. Archived from the original on 19 April 2022.
- Кавказский календарь на 1917 год [Caucasian calendar for 1917] (in Russian) (72nd ed.). Tiflis: Tipografiya kantselyarii Ye.I.V. na Kavkaze, kazenny dom. 1917. Archived from the original on 4 November 2021.
- Tsutsiev, Arthur (2014). Atlas of the Ethno-Political History of the Caucasus (PDF). Translated by Nora Seligman Favorov. New Haven: Yale University Press. ISBN 9780300153088. Archived (PDF) from the original on 17 June 2023.
