= Novorossiysky okrug =

Coordinates: 44°43′N 37°45′E

Novorossiysky okrug Новороссійскій округъ
- Okrug
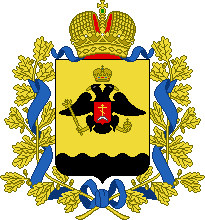
- Coat of arms

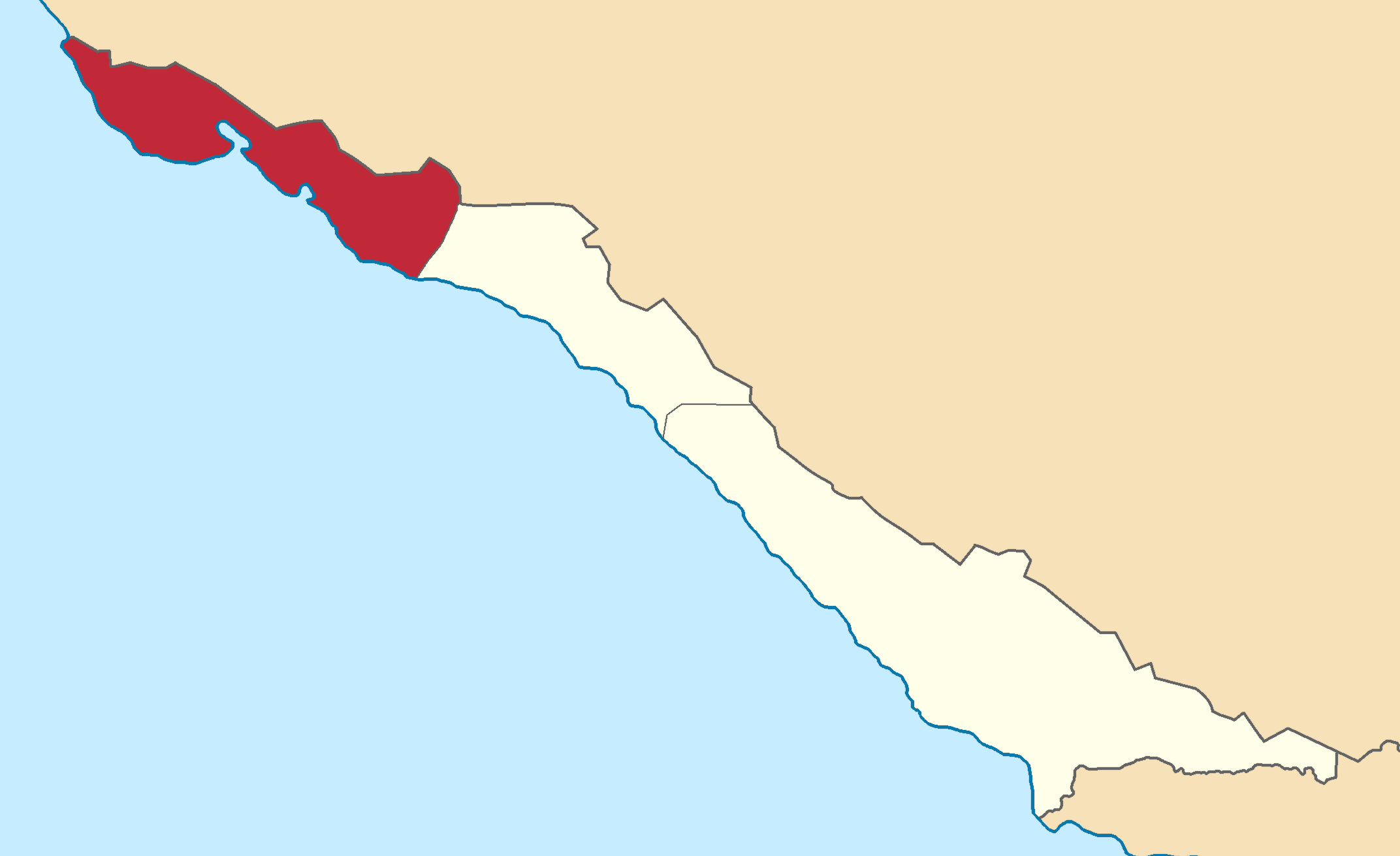
- Location in the Black Sea Governorate
- Country: Russian Empire
- Viceroyalty: Caucasus
- Governorate: Black Sea
- Established: 1849
- Abolished: 1917
- Capital: Novorossiysk

Area
  - Total: 1,137.07 km^{2} (439.03 sq mi)

Population (1916)
  - Total: 75,021
  - Density: 65.977/km^{2} (170.88/sq mi)
  - Urban: 68.85%
  - Rural: 31.15%

The Novorossiysky okrug (Note: Russian: Новороссíйскій о́кругъ, romanized: Novorossíysky ókrug) was a district (okrug) of the Black Sea Governorate of the Caucasus Viceroyalty of the Russian Empire. It bordered the Kuban Oblast to the north, the Tuapsinsky okrug to the east, and the Black Sea to the south. The area of the Novorossiysky okrug mostly corresponds to the Krasnodar Krai region of Russia. The district was eponymously named for its administrative centre, Novorossiysk.

== Demographics ==
=== Russian Empire Census ===
According to the Russian Empire Census, the Novorossiysky okrug had a population of 34,908 on 28 January [O.S. 15 January] 1897, including 21,380 men and 13,528 women. The majority of the population indicated Russian to be their mother tongue, with significant Ukrainian and Greek speaking minorities.

Linguistic composition of the Novorossiysky okrug in 1897
Language	Native speakers	%
Russian	19,292	55.27
Ukrainian	5,842	16.74
Greek	3,502	10.03
Czech	1,009	2.89
Jewish	966	2.77
Armenian	739	2.12
Polish	599	1.72
Belarusian	584	1.67
German	500	1.43
Tatar (Note: Before 1918, Azerbaijanis were generally known as "Tatars". This term, employed by the Russians, referred to Turkic-speaking Muslims of the South Caucasus. After 1918, with the establishment of the Azerbaijan Democratic Republic and "especially during the Soviet era", the Tatar group identified itself as "Azerbaijani".)	260	0.74
Georgian	256	0.73
Turkish	238	0.68
Estonian	190	0.54
Romanian	166	0.48
Persian	99	0.28
Imeretian	71	0.20
Mingrelian	20	0.06
Circassian	14	0.04
Other	561	1.61
TOTAL	34,908	100.00

=== Kavkazskiy kalendar ===
According to the 1917 publication of Kavkazskiy kalendar, the Novorossiysky okrug had a population of 75,021 on 14 January [O.S. 1 January] 1916, including 41,919 men and 33,102 women, 37,544 of whom were the permanent population, and 37,477 were temporary residents:

Nationality	Urban		Rural		TOTAL	
Nationality	Number	%	Number	%	Number	%
Russians	44,295	85.76	16,907	72.34	61,202	81.58
Other Europeans	4,170	8.07	6,032	25.81	10,202	13.60
Jews	1,634	3.16	9	0.04	1,643	2.19
Armenians	790	1.53	319	1.36	1,109	1.48
North Caucasians	400	0.77	94	0.40	494	0.66
Shia Muslims (Note: Primarily Tatars.)	362	0.70	1	0.00	363	0.48
Asiatic Christians	0	0.00	8	0.03	8	0.01
TOTAL	51,651	100.00	23,370	100.00	75,021	100.00

== Bibliography ==
- Bournoutian, George A. (2018). Armenia and Imperial Decline: The Yerevan Province, 1900–1914. Milton Park, Abingdon, Oxon: Routledge. ISBN 978-1-351-06260-2. OCLC 1037283914.
- Hovannisian, Richard G. (1971). The Republic of Armenia. Vol. 1: The First Year, 1918–1919. Berkeley: University of California Press. ISBN 978-0520019843.
- Кавказский календарь на 1917 год [Caucasian calendar for 1917] (in Russian) (72nd ed.). Tiflis: Tipografiya kantselyarii Ye.I.V. na Kavkaze, kazenny dom. 1917. Archived from the original on 4 November 2021.
- Tsutsiev, Arthur (2014). Atlas of the Ethno-Political History of the Caucasus (PDF). Translated by Nora Seligman Favorov. New Haven: Yale University Press. ISBN 9780300153088. Archived (PDF) from the original on 17 June 2023.
