= Sochinsky okrug =

Coordinates: 43°35′07″N 39°43′13″E

Sochinsky okrug Сочинскій окргъ
- Okrug
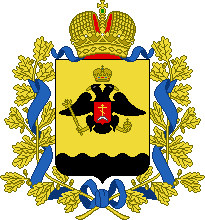
- Coat of arms

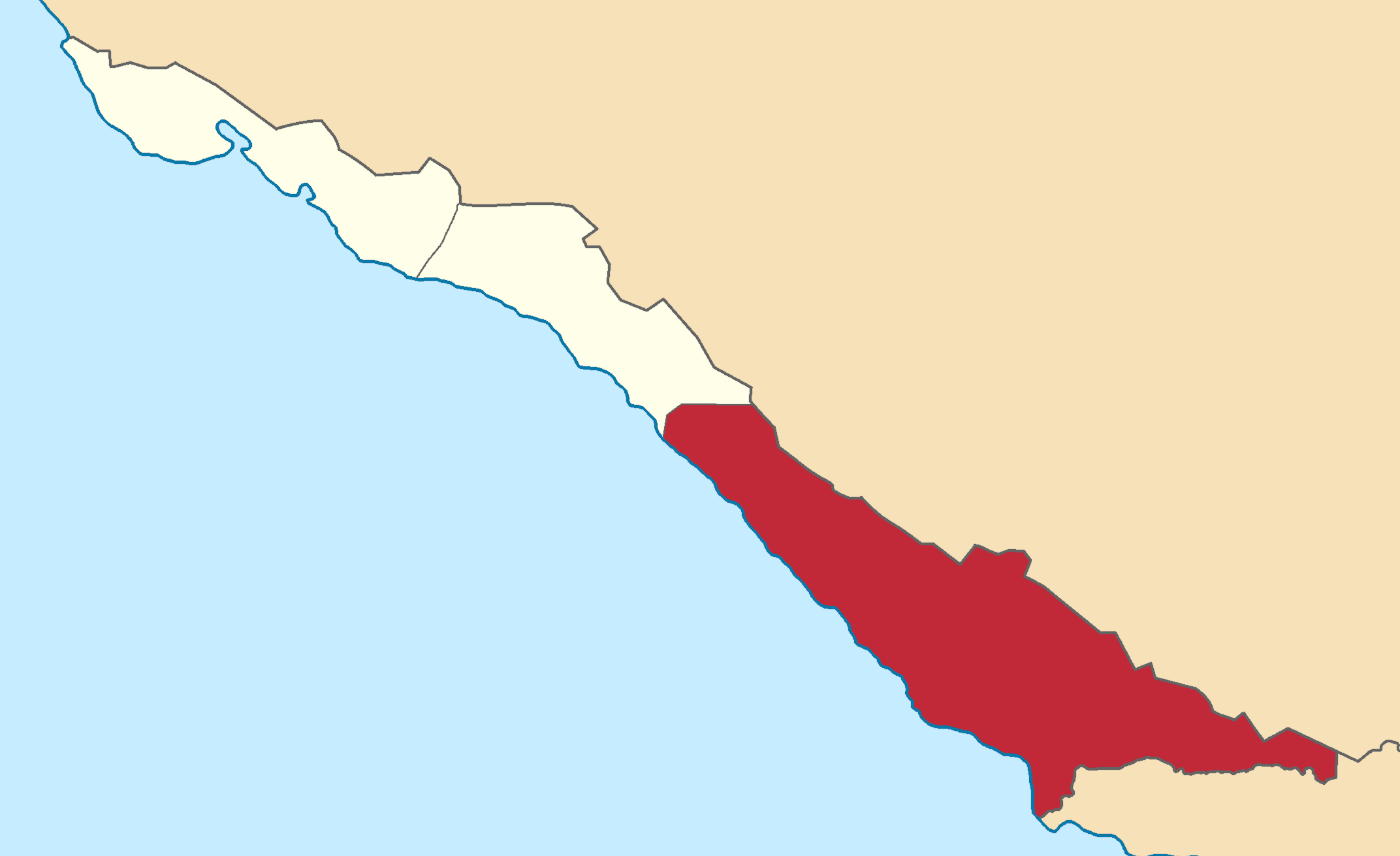
- Location in the Black Sea Governorate
- Country: Russian Empire
- Viceroyalty: Caucasus
- Governorate: Black Sea
- Established: 1849
- Abolished: 1917
- Capital: Sochi

Area
  - Total: 3,761.11 km^{2} (1,452.17 sq mi)

Population (1916)
  - Total: 62,920
  - Density: 16.73/km^{2} (43.33/sq mi)
  - Urban: 21.06%
  - Rural: 78.94%

The Sochinsky okrug (Note: Russian: Со́чинскій о́кругъ, romanized: Sóchinsky ókrug; Armenian: Սոչիի գավառ, romanized: Sočii gavaṙ) was a district (okrug) of the Black Sea Governorate of the Caucasus Viceroyalty of the Russian Empire. It bordered the Kuban Oblast to the north, the Tuapsinsky okrug to the west, the Sukhumi okrug to the east, and the Black Sea to the south. The area of the Sochinsky okrug mostly corresponds to the Krasnodar Krai region of the Russian Federation. The district was eponymously named for its administrative centre, Sochi.

== Demographics ==
=== Russian Empire Census ===
According to the Russian Empire Census, the Sochinsky okrug had a population of 13,519 on 28 January [O.S. 15 January] 1897, including 8,147 men and 5,372 women. The plurality of the population indicated Armenian to be their mother tongue, with significant Russian, Greek, Ukrainian, Circassian, and Georgian speaking minorities.

Linguistic composition of the Sochinsky okrug in 1897
Language	Native speakers	%
Armenian	3,857	28.53
Russian	2,561	18.94
Greek	2,092	15.47
Ukrainian	1,240	9.17
Circassian	746	5.52
Georgian	681	5.04
Romanian	613	4.53
Estonian	599	4.43
Turkish	332	2.46
Mingrelian	269	1.99
German	166	1.23
Persian	59	0.44
Belarusian	53	0.39
Imeretian	52	0.38
Polish	49	0.36
Tatar (Note: Before 1918, Azerbaijanis were generally known as "Tatars". This term, employed by the Russians, referred to Turkic-speaking Muslims of the South Caucasus. After 1918, with the establishment of the Azerbaijan Democratic Republic and "especially during the Soviet era", the Tatar group identified itself as "Azerbaijani".)	28	0.21
Jewish	13	0.10
Czech	12	0.09
Other	97	0.72
TOTAL	13,519	100.00

=== Kavkazskiy kalendar ===
According to the 1917 publication of Kavkazskiy kalendar, the Sochinsky okrug had a population of 62,920 on 14 January [O.S. 1 January] 1916, including 37,516 men and 25,404 women, 16,227 of whom were the permanent population, and 46,693 were temporary residents:

Nationality	Urban		Rural		TOTAL	
Nationality	Number	%	Number	%	Number	%
Russians	9,653	72.83	22,170	44.64	31,823	50.58
Armenians	521	3.93	13,590	27.36	14,111	22.43
Other Europeans	1,003	7.57	8,324	16.76	9,327	14.82
Georgians	1,750	13.20	4,336	8.73	6,086	9.67
North Caucasians	22	0.17	732	1.47	754	1.20
Shia Muslims (Note: Primarily Tatars.)	227	1.71	453	0.91	680	1.08
Jews	73	0.55	0	0.00	73	0.12
Sunni Muslims (Note: Primarily Turco-Tatars.)	5	0.04	49	0.10	54	0.09
Roma	0	0.00	12	0.02	12	0.02
TOTAL	13,254	100.00	49,666	100.00	62,920	100.00

== Bibliography ==
- Bournoutian, George A. (2018). Armenia and Imperial Decline: The Yerevan Province, 1900–1914. Milton Park, Abingdon, Oxon: Routledge. ISBN 978-1-351-06260-2. OCLC 1037283914.
- Hovannisian, Richard G. (1971). The Republic of Armenia. Vol. 1: The First Year, 1918–1919. Berkeley: University of California Press. ISBN 978-0520019843.
- Кавказский календарь на 1917 год [Caucasian calendar for 1917] (in Russian) (72nd ed.). Tiflis: Tipografiya kantselyarii Ye.I.V. na Kavkaze, kazenny dom. 1917. Archived from the original on 4 November 2021.
- Tsutsiev, Arthur (2014). Atlas of the Ethno-Political History of the Caucasus (PDF). Translated by Nora Seligman Favorov. New Haven: Yale University Press. ISBN 9780300153088. Archived (PDF) from the original on 17 June 2023.
