= Ozurgeti uezd =

Coordinates: 41°55′37″N 42°00′02″E

Ozurgeti uezd Озургетскій уѣздъ
- Uezd
- Coat of arms

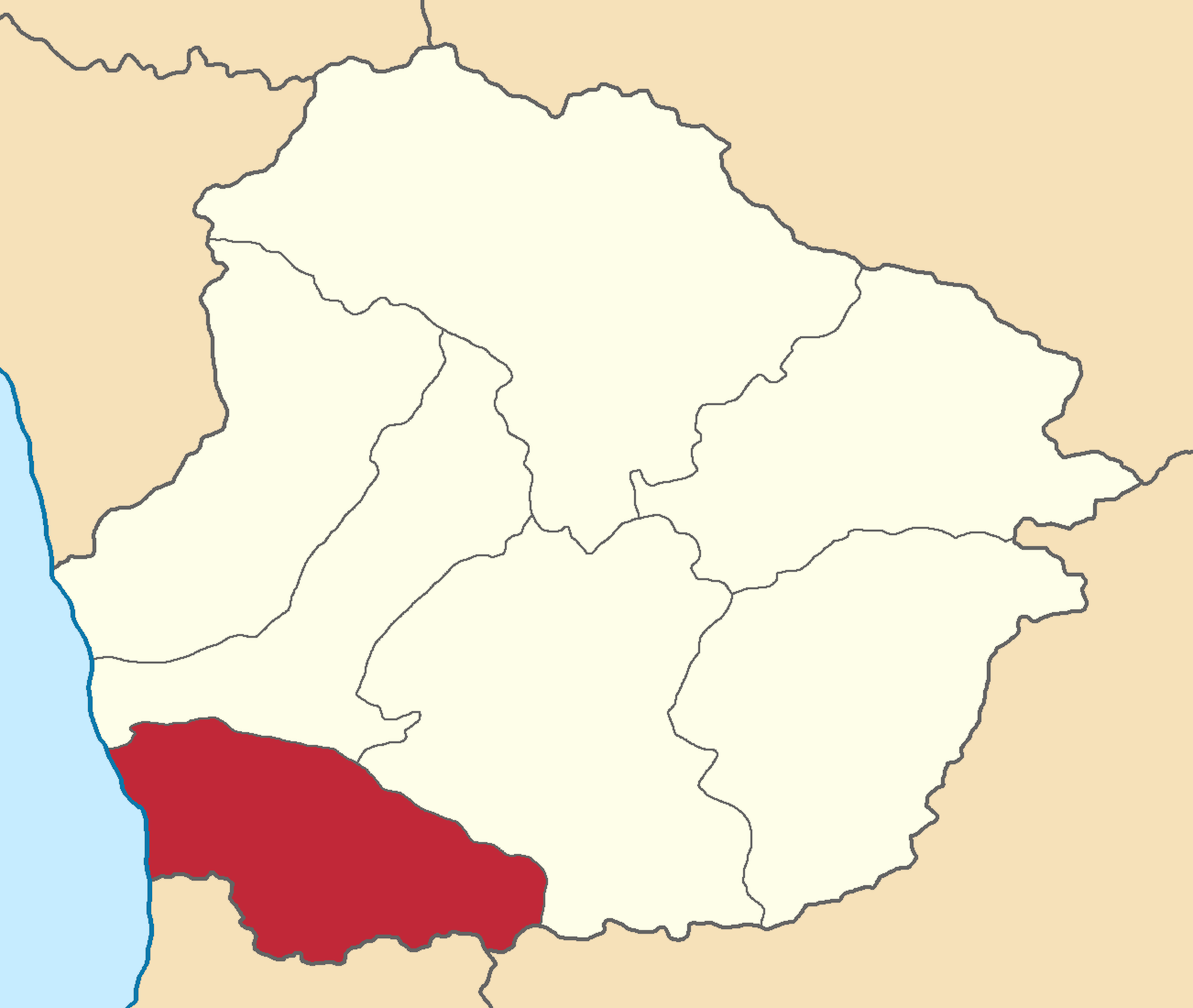
- Location in the Kutais Governorate
- Country: Russian Empire
- Viceroyalty: Caucasus
- Governorate: Kutaisi
- Established: 1846
- Abolished: 1930
- Capital: Ozurgeti

Area
  - Total: 2,161.23 km^{2} (834.46 sq mi)

Population (1916)
  - Total: 115,339
  - Density: 53.3673/km^{2} (138.221/sq mi)
  - Urban: 9.71%
  - Rural: 90.29%

The Ozurgeti uezd (Note: Russian: Озурге́тскій уѣ́здъ, romanized: Ozurgétsky uyézd; Georgian: ოზურგეთის მაზრა, romanized: ozurgetis mazra) was a county (uezd) of the Kutaisi Governorate of the Caucasus Viceroyalty of the Russian Empire. It bordered the Senaki uezd to the north, the Kutaisi uezd to the east, the Akhaltsikhe uezd of the Tiflis Governorate to the southeast, the Batum Okrug of the Batum Oblast to the south, and the Black Sea to the west. The area of the Ozurgeti uezd corresponded to most of the contemporary Guria region of Georgia. The county was eponymously named for its administrative center, Ozurgeti.

== History ==
The Ozurgeti uezd was formed in 1846 as part of the Kutaisi Governorate during the time of the Russian Empire. In 1918, the Kutaisi Governorate including the Ozurgeti uezd was incorporated into the Democratic Republic of Georgia.

== Administrative divisions ==
The subcounties (uchastoks) of the Ozurgeti uezd in 1913 were as follows:

Name	1912 population	Area
Guriantskiy uchastok (Гуриантскій участокъ)	20,585	606.10 square versts (689.78 km^{2}; 266.33 mi^{2})
Lanchkhutskiy uchastok (Ланчхутскій участокъ)	38,658	464.68 square versts (528.83 km^{2}; 204.18 mi^{2})
Chokhataurskiy uchastok (Чохатаурскій участокъ)	37,603	828.26 square versts (942.61 km^{2}; 363.94 mi^{2})

== Demographics ==
=== Russian Empire Census ===
According to the Russian Empire Census, the Ozurgeti uezd had a population of 90,326 on 28 January [O.S. 15 January] 1897, including 45,426 men and 44,900 women. The majority of the population indicated Georgian to be their mother tongue, with a significant Greek speaking minority.

Linguistic composition of the Ozurgeti uezd in 1897
Language	Native speakers	%
Georgian	86,057	95.27
Greek	3,009	3.33
Russian	526	0.58
Mingrelian	305	0.34
Turkish	179	0.20
Svan	44	0.05
Ukrainian	41	0.05
Tatar (Note: Before 1918, Azerbaijanis were generally known as "Tatars". This term, employed by the Russians, referred to Turkic-speaking Muslims of the South Caucasus. After 1918, with the establishment of the Azerbaijan Democratic Republic and "especially during the Soviet era", the Tatar group identified itself as "Azerbaijani".)	39	0.04
Armenian	29	0.03
German	22	0.02
Polish	20	0.02
Abkhaz	10	0.01
Imeretian	8	0.01
Persian	6	0.01
Avar-Andean	5	0.01
Belarusian	2	0.00
Jewish	1	0.00
Kurdish	1	0.00
Ossetian	1	0.00
Other	21	0.02
TOTAL	90,326	100.00

=== Kavkazskiy kalendar ===
According to the 1917 publication of Kavkazskiy kalendar, the Ozurgeti uezd had a population of 115,339 on 14 January [O.S. 1 January] 1916, including 61,071 men and 54,268 women, 111,987 of whom were the permanent population, and 3,352 were temporary residents:

Nationality	Urban		Rural		TOTAL	
Nationality	Number	%	Number	%	Number	%
Georgians	10,259	91.61	104,066	99.93	114,325	99.12
Russians	695	6.21	75	0.07	770	0.67
Other Europeans	182	1.63	0	0.00	182	0.16
Armenians	42	0.38	0	0.00	42	0.04
Jews	20	0.18	0	0.00	20	0.02
TOTAL	11,198	100.00	104,141	100.00	115,339	100.00

== Bibliography ==
- Bournoutian, George A. (2018). Armenia and Imperial Decline: The Yerevan Province, 1900–1914. Milton Park, Abingdon, Oxon: Routledge. ISBN 978-1-351-06260-2. OCLC 1037283914.
- Кавказский календарь на 1913 год [Caucasian calendar for 1913] (in Russian) (68th ed.). Tiflis: Tipografiya kantselyarii Ye.I.V. na Kavkaze, kazenny dom. 1913. Archived from the original on 19 April 2022.
- Кавказский календарь на 1917 год [Caucasian calendar for 1917] (in Russian) (72nd ed.). Tiflis: Tipografiya kantselyarii Ye.I.V. na Kavkaze, kazenny dom. 1917. Archived from the original on 4 November 2021.
- Tsutsiev, Arthur (2014). Atlas of the Ethno-Political History of the Caucasus (PDF). Translated by Nora Seligman Favorov. New Haven: Yale University Press. ISBN 9780300153088. Archived (PDF) from the original on 17 June 2023.
