= Kutaisi Governorate =

Governorate of the Caucasus Viceroyalty, Russian Empire

Coordinates: 42.2500°N 42.7000°E

Kutaisi Governorate Кутаисская губернія
- Governorate
- Coat of arms

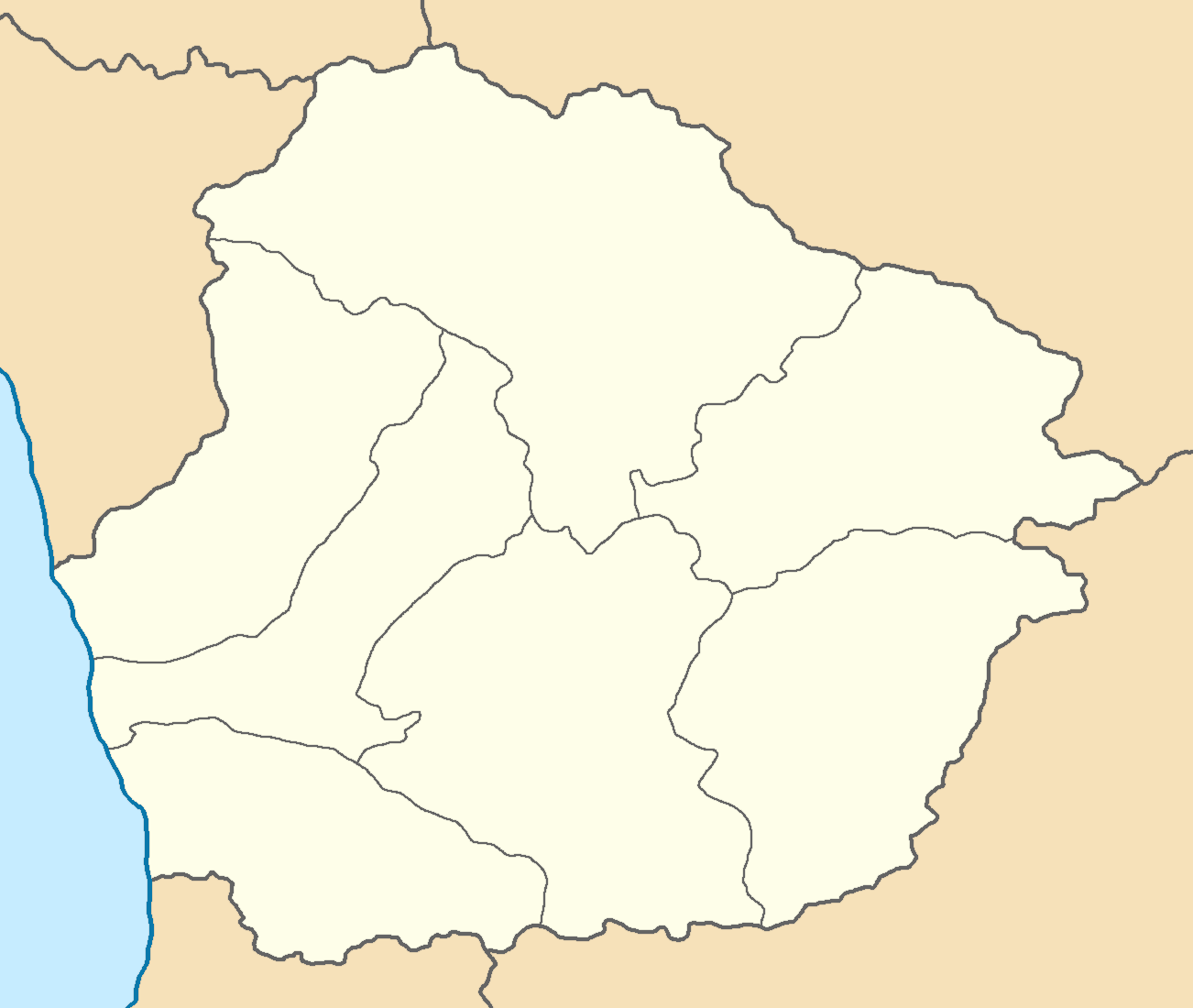
- Administrative map of the Kutaisi Governorate (1905–17)
- Country: Russian Empire
- Viceroyalty: Caucasus
- Established: 1849
- Abolished: 1917
- Capital: Kutais (present-day Kutaisi)

Area
  - Total: 19,956.06 km^{2} (7,705.08 sq mi)
- Highest elevation (Shkhara): 5,193 m (17,037 ft)

Population (1916)
  - Total: 1,034,468
  - Density: 51.83729/km^{2} (134.2580/sq mi)
  - Urban: 8.51%
  - Rural: 91.49%

The Kutaisi or Kutais Governorate (Note: Russian: Кутаи́сская губе́рнія, romanized: Kutaísskaya gubérniya; Georgian: ქუთაისის გუბერნია, romanized: kutaisis gubernia) was a province (guberniya) of the Caucasus Viceroyalty of the Russian Empire. It roughly corresponded to most of western Georgia throughout most of its existence, and most of the Artvin Province (except the Hopa and Yusufeli districts) of Turkey between 1878 and 1903. Created out of part of the former Georgia-Imeretia Governorate in 1846, the governorate also included Akhaltsikhe uezd before its cession to the Tiflis Governorate in 1867. The Kutaisi Governorate bordered the Sukhumi Okrug to the northwest, the Kuban Oblast to the north, the Terek Oblast to the northeast, the Tiflis Governorate to the southeast, the Batum Oblast to the southwest, and the Black Sea to the west. The governorate was eponymously named for its administrative center, Kutais (present-day Kutaisi).

== History ==
The Kutaisi Governorate was formed in 1846 as a result of the division of the Georgia-Imeretia Governorate. In 1883, the governorate included the Sukhumi Okrug and two districts (Artvin and Batum) of the then-abolished Batum Oblast. In 1903, the Artvin and Batum districts were detached and re-formed into the Batum Oblast. In 1905, the Sukhumi Okrug also received the status of a special district of the Russian Empire, tantamount to a governorate or oblast.

Following the Russian Revolution, in 1918 the Kutaisi Governorate became part of the short-lived Georgian Democratic Republic.

== Administrative divisions ==
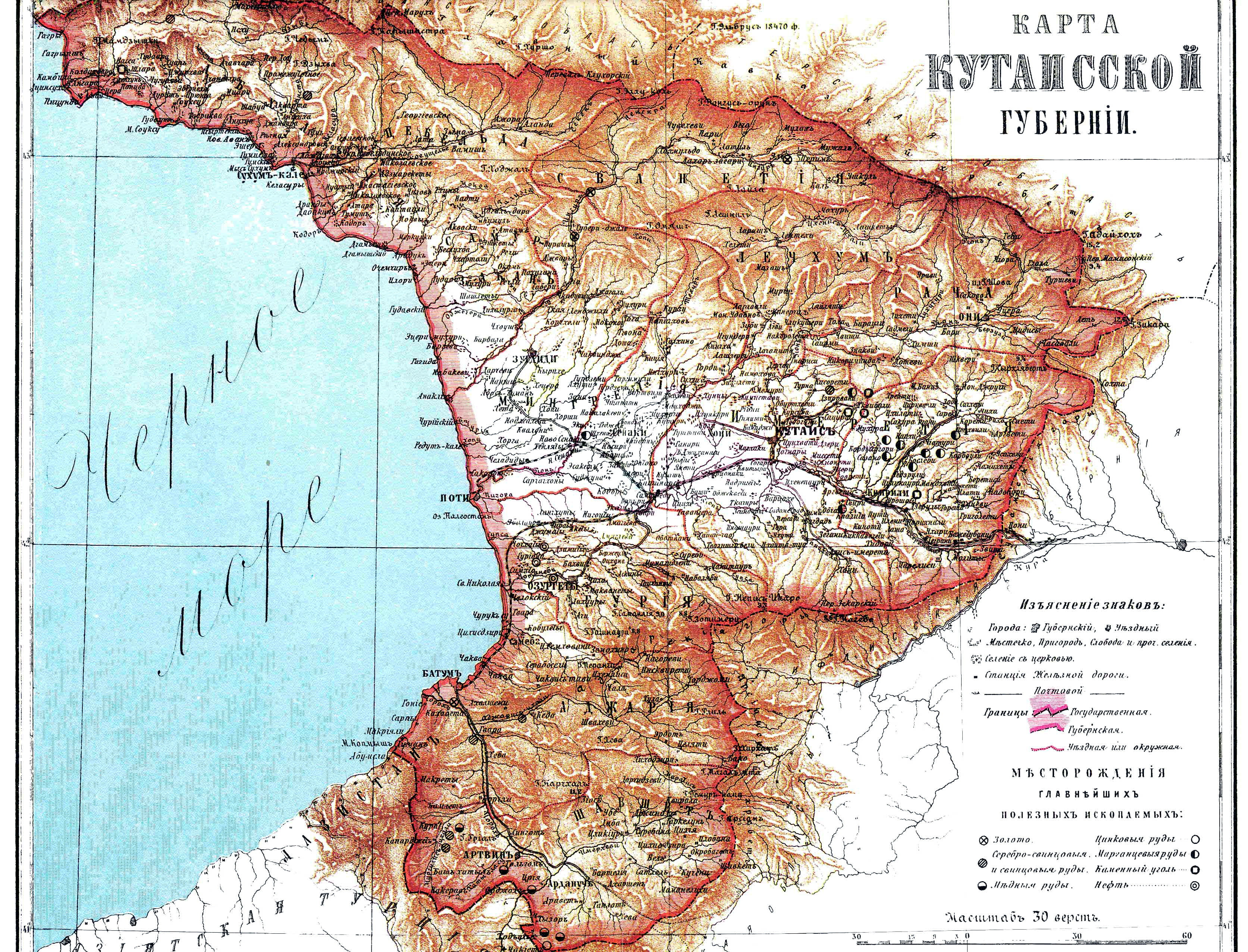
Kutaisi Governorate in 1883-1903

The counties (uezds) of the Kutaisi Governorate in 1917 were as follows:

Name	Administrative centre			Population		Area
Name		1897	1916	1897	1916	Area
Zugdidi uezd (Зугдидскій уѣздъ)	Zugdid (Zugdidi)	3,407	4,000	114,869	127,978	2,346.43 square versts (2,670.38 km^{2}; 1,031.04 mi^{2})
Kutaisi uezd (Кутаисскій уѣздъ)	Kutais (Kutaisi)	32,476	58,151	221,665	291,969	2,042.64 square versts (2,324.65 km^{2}; 897.55 mi^{2})
Lechkhumi uezd (Лечхумскій уѣздъ)	Tsagery (Tsageri)	687	---	47,779	61,914	4,281.88 square versts (4,873.05 km^{2}; 1,881.49 mi^{2})
Ozurgeti uezd (Озургетскій уѣздъ)	Ozurgety (Ozurgeti)	4,710	11,198	90,326	115,339	1,899.04 square versts (2,161.23 km^{2}; 834.45 mi^{2})
Racha uezd (Рачинскій уѣздъ)	Oni	1,255	---	60,421	88,162	2,476.58 square versts (2,818.50 km^{2}; 1,088.23 mi^{2})
Senaki uezd (Сенакскій уѣздъ)	Senaki	1,248	---	115,785	159,678	1,869.20 square versts (2,127.27 km^{2}; 821.34 mi^{2})
Shorapani uezd (Шорапанскій уѣздъ)	Kvirily (Zestaponi)	2,010	---	156,633	189,428	2,619.35 square versts (2,980.98 km^{2}; 1,150.96 mi^{2})

== Demographics ==
=== Russian Empire census (1897) ===
According to the Russian Empire Census, the Kutaisi Governorate had a population of 1,058,241 on 28 January [O.S. 15 January] 1897, including 549,504 men and 508,737 women. The majority of the populated indicated a Kartvelian language to be their mother tongue, principally comprising Georgian, Imeretian and Mingrelian.

Linguistic composition of the Kutaisi Governorate in 1897
Language	Native speakers	%
Georgian	343,929	32.50
Imeretian (Note: Considered a dialect of Georgian.)	270,513	25.56
Mingrelian	238,655	22.55
Abkhaz	59,469	5.62
Turkish	46,665	4.41
Armenian	24,043	2.27
Russian	19,273	1.82
Svan	15,669	1.48
Greek	14,482	1.37
Jewish	7,006	0.66
Ossetian	4,240	0.40
Ukrainian	4,008	0.38
Polish	1,938	0.18
Kurdish	1,824	0.17
German	1,065	0.10
Persian	1,022	0.10
Tatar (Note: Before 1918, Azerbaijanis were generally known as "Tatars". This term, employed by the Russians, referred to Turkic-speaking Muslims of the South Caucasus. After 1918, with the establishment of the Azerbaijan Democratic Republic and "especially during the Soviet era", the Tatar group identified itself as "Azerbaijani".)	750	0.07
Estonian	621	0.06
Lithuanian	450	0.04
Romanian	197	0.02
Belarusian	162	0.02
Sartic	156	0.01
Avar-Andean	148	0.01
English	135	0.01
Kazi-Kumukh	111	0.01
Other	1,710	0.16
TOTAL	1,058,241	100.00

Religious composition of the Kutaisi Governorate in 1897
Faith	Male	Female	Both	
Faith	Male	Female	Number	%
Eastern Orthodox	462,243	438,687	900,930	85.13
Muslim	64,043	53,577	117,620	11.11
Armenian Apostolic	11,610	7,370	18,980	1.79
Judaism	4,674	4,190	8,864	0.84
Armenian Catholic	2,631	2,894	5,525	0.52
Roman Catholic	3,065	1,195	4,260	0.40
Lutheran	999	676	1,675	0.16
Old Believer	156	92	248	0.02
Karaite	29	17	46	0.00
Reformed	15	13	28	0.00
Buddhist	16	5	21	0.00
Anglican	12	6	18	0.00
Baptist	2	10	12	0.00
Mennonite	5	2	7	0.00
Other Christian denomination	3	3	6	0.00
Other non-Christian denomination	1	0	1	0.00
TOTAL	549,504	508,737	1,058,241	100.00

=== Kavkazskiy kalendar ===
According to the 1917 publication of Kavkazskiy kalendar, the Kutaisi Governorate had a population of 1,034,468 on 14 January [O.S. 1 January] 1916, including 546,957 men and 487,511 women, 990,297 of whom were the permanent population, and 44,171 were temporary residents. The population total of the governorate is slightly less than in 1897 due to the province's administrative reorganization involving the detachment of the Artvin, Batum and Sukhumi okrugs (to be administered separately):

Nationality	Urban		Rural		TOTAL	
Nationality	Number	%	Number	%	Number	%
Georgians	56,543	64.20	936,869	98.99	993,412	96.03
Jews	11,346	12.88	6,450	0.68	17,796	1.72
Russians	14,506	16.47	1,379	0.15	15,885	1.54
Armenians	3,416	3.88	1,189	0.13	4,605	0.45
Asiatic Christians	1,450	1.65	29	0.00	1,479	0.14
Other Europeans	654	0.74	328	0.03	982	0.09
Sunni Muslims (Note: Primarily Turco-Tatars.)	70	0.08	74	0.01	144	0.01
Shia Muslims (Note: Primarily Tatars.)	95	0.11	38	0.00	133	0.01
North Caucasians	0	0.00	32	0.00	32	0.00
TOTAL	88,080	100.00	946,388	100.00	1,034,468	100.00

== Bibliography ==
- Bournoutian, George A. (2018). Armenia and Imperial Decline: The Yerevan Province, 1900–1914. Milton Park, Abingdon, Oxon: Routledge. ISBN 978-1-351-06260-2. OCLC 1037283914.
- Hovannisian, Richard G. (1971). The Republic of Armenia. Vol. 1: The First Year, 1918–1919. Berkeley: University of California Press. ISBN 978-0520019843.
- Кавказский календарь на 1917 год [Caucasian calendar for 1917] (in Russian) (72nd ed.). Tiflis: Tipografiya kantselyarii Ye.I.V. na Kavkaze, kazenny dom. 1917. Archived from the original on 4 November 2021.
- Tsutsiev, Arthur (2014). Atlas of the Ethno-Political History of the Caucasus (PDF). Translated by Nora Seligman Favorov. New Haven: Yale University Press. ISBN 9780300153088. Archived (PDF) from the original on 17 June 2023.
