= Shorapani uezd =

Coordinates: 42°06′30″N 43°02′30″E

Shorapani uezd Шорапанскій уѣздъ
- Uezd
- Coat of arms

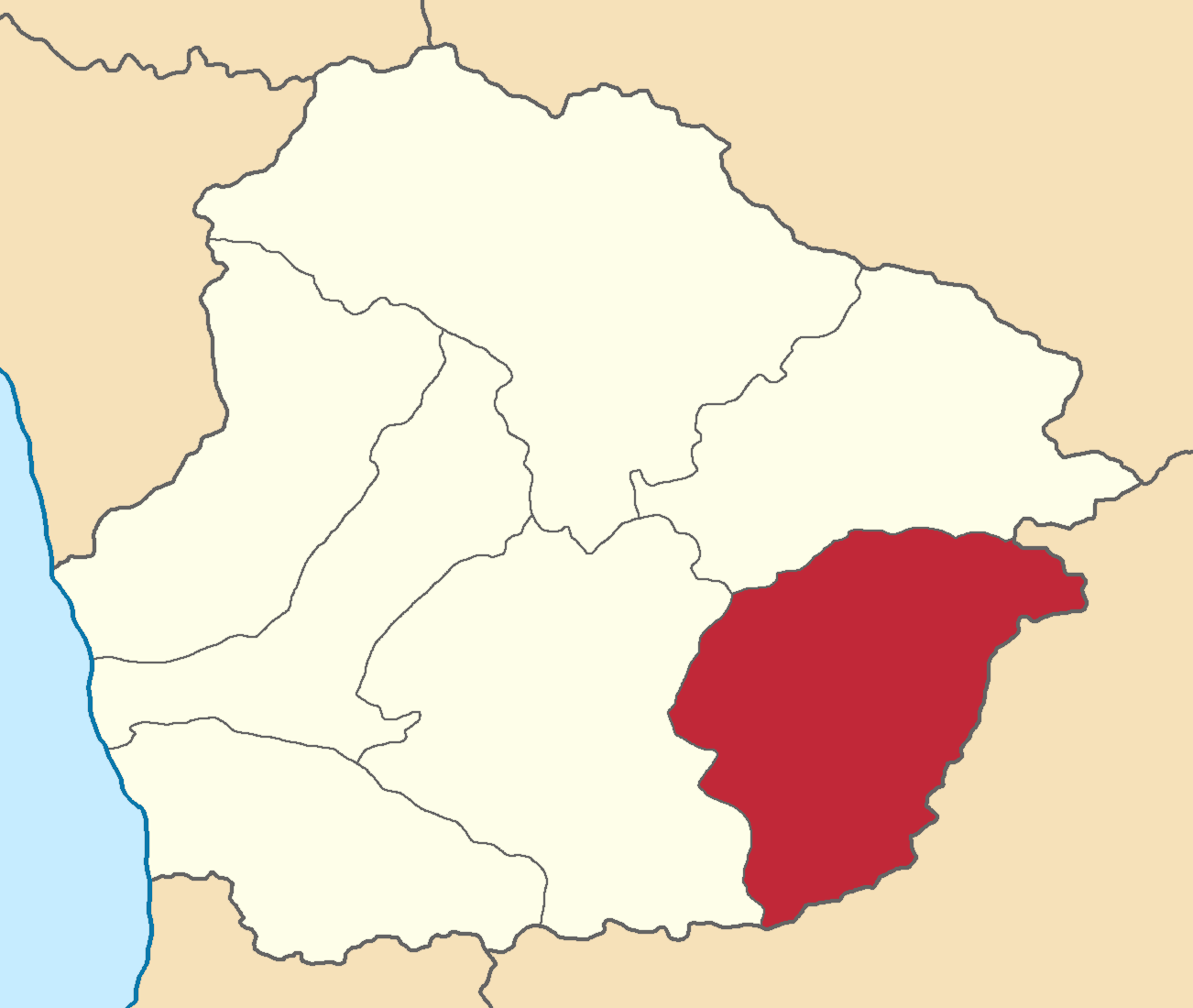
- Location in the Kutaisi Governorate
- Country: Russian Empire
- Viceroyalty: Caucasus
- Governorate: Kutaisi
- Established: 1846
- Abolished: 1930
- Capital: Kvirila (present-day Zestaponi)

Area
  - Total: 2,980.98 km^{2} (1,150.96 sq mi)

Population (1916)
  - Total: 189,428
  - Density: 63.5455/km^{2} (164.582/sq mi)
  - Rural: 100.00%

The Shorapani uezd (Note: Russian: Шорапа́нскій уѣ́здъ, romanized: Shorapánsky uyézd; Georgian: ქუთაისის მაზრა, romanized: kutaisis mazra) was a county (uezd) of the Kutaisi Governorate of the Caucasus Viceroyalty of the Russian Empire. It bordered the Racha uezd to the north, the Kutaisi uezd to the west, and the Tiflis Governorate to the east. The area of the uezd corresponded to most of the contemporary Imereti region of Georgia. The administrative center of the Shorapani uezd was Kvirila (present-day Zestaponi).

== History ==
The Shorapani uezd was formed in 1846 as part of the Kutaisi Governorate on the territory of the historical region of Imereti during the time of the Russian Empire. In 1918, the Kutaisi Governorate including the Shorapani uezd was incorporated into part of the Democratic Republic of Georgia.

== Administrative divisions ==
The subcounties (uchastoks) of the Shorapani uezd in 1913 were as follows:

Name	1912 population
Belogorskiy uchastok (Белогорскій участокъ)	19,810
Kvirilskiy uchastok (Квирильскій участокъ)	16,695
Sachkherskiy uchastok (Сачхерскій участокъ)	19,868
Chiaturskiy uchastok (Чіатурскій участокъ)	18,896
Chiaturskiy promysl uchastok (Чіатурскій промыслъ участокъ)	76
Chkharskiy uchastok (Чхарскій участокъ)	19,147

== Demographics ==
=== Russian Empire Census ===
According to the Russian Empire Census, the Shorapani uezd had a population of 156,633 on 28 January [O.S. 15 January] 1897, including 74,366 men and 56,826 women. The majority of the population indicated Georgian to be their mother tongue, with significant Imeretian and Mingrelian speaking minorities.

Linguistic composition of the Shorapani uezd in 1897
Language	Native speakers	%
Georgian	106,876	68.23
Imeretian	44,658	28.51
Mingrelian	2,129	1.36
Jewish	678	0.43
Ossetian	618	0.39
Greek	553	0.35
Armenian	470	0.30
Russian	410	0.26
Polish	54	0.03
Turkish	35	0.02
Tatar (Note: Before 1918, Azerbaijanis were generally known as "Tatars". This term, employed by the Russians, referred to Turkic-speaking Muslims of the South Caucasus. After 1918, with the establishment of the Azerbaijan Democratic Republic and "especially during the Soviet era", the Tatar group identified itself as "Azerbaijani".)	28	0.02
German	27	0.02
Persian	16	0.01
Avar-Andean	10	0.01
Ukrainian	7	0.00
Abkhaz	6	0.00
Kazi-Kumukh	4	0.00
Belarusian	3	0.00
Lithuanian	2	0.00
Svan	2	0.00
Other	47	0.03
TOTAL	156,633	100.00

=== Kavkazskiy kalendar ===
According to the 1917 publication of Kavkazskiy kalendar, the Shorapani uezd had a population of 189,428 on 14 January [O.S. 1 January] 1916, including 100,322 men and 89,106 women, 179,353 of whom were the permanent population, and 10,075 were temporary residents:

Ethnic group	Shorapani	
Georgians	186,305	98.35
Jews	1,235	0.65
Armenians	900	0.48
Russians	544	0.29
Other Europeans	299	0.16
Sunni Muslims (Note: Primarily Turco-Tatars.)	57	0.03
North Caucasians	31	0.02
Asiatic Christians	29	0.02
Shia Muslims (Note: Primarily Tatars.)	28	0.01
TOTAL	189,428	100.00

== Bibliography ==
- Bournoutian, George A. (2018). Armenia and Imperial Decline: The Yerevan Province, 1900–1914. Milton Park, Abingdon, Oxon: Routledge. ISBN 978-1-351-06260-2. OCLC 1037283914.
- Hovannisian, Richard G. (1971). The Republic of Armenia. Vol. 1: The First Year, 1918–1919. Berkeley: University of California Press. ISBN 978-0520019843.
- Кавказский календарь на 1913 год [Caucasian calendar for 1913] (in Russian) (68th ed.). Tiflis: Tipografiya kantselyarii Ye.I.V. na Kavkaze, kazenny dom. 1913. Archived from the original on 19 April 2022.
- Кавказский календарь на 1917 год [Caucasian calendar for 1917] (in Russian) (72nd ed.). Tiflis: Tipografiya kantselyarii Ye.I.V. na Kavkaze, kazenny dom. 1917. Archived from the original on 4 November 2021.
- Tsutsiev, Arthur (2014). Atlas of the Ethno-Political History of the Caucasus (PDF). Translated by Nora Seligman Favorov. New Haven: Yale University Press. ISBN 9780300153088. Archived (PDF) from the original on 17 June 2023.
