= Kutaisi uezd =

Coordinates: 42°15′0″N 42°42′0″E

Kutaisi uezd Кутаисскій уѣздъ
- Uezd
- Coat of arms

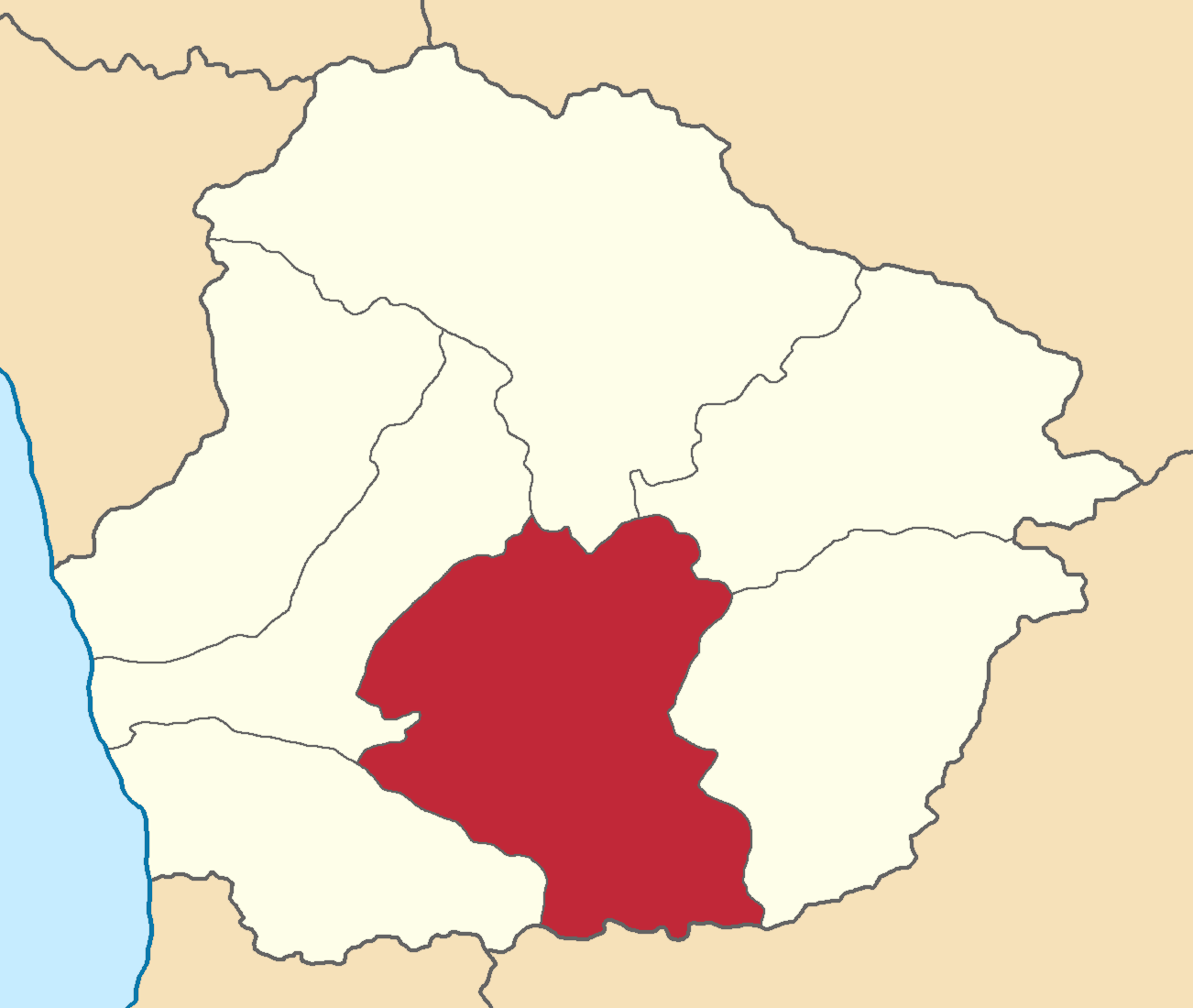
- Location in the Kutaisi Governorate
- Country: Russian Empire
- Viceroyalty: Caucasus
- Governorate: Kutaisi
- Established: 1846
- Abolished: 1928
- Capital: Kutais (present-day Kutaisi)

Area
  - Total: 2,324.65 km^{2} (897.55 sq mi)

Population (1916)
  - Total: 291,969
  - Density: 125.597/km^{2} (325.295/sq mi)
  - Urban: 19.92%
  - Rural: 80.08%

The Kutaisi uezd (Note: Russian: Кутаи́сскій уѣ́здъ, romanized: Kutaíssky uyézd; Georgian: ქუთაისის მაზრა, romanized: kutaisis mazra) was a county (uezd) of the Kutaisi Governorate of the Caucasus Viceroyalty of the Russian Empire. It bordered the Akhaltsikhe uezd of the Tiflis Governorate to the south, the Ozurgeti and Senaki uezds to the west, the Lechkhumi and Racha uezds to the north, and the Shorapani uezd to the east. The area of the uezd corresponded to most of the contemporary Imereti region of Georgia. The Kutaisi uezd was eponymously named for its administrative center, Kutais (present-day Kutaisi).

== History ==
The Kutaisi uezd was formed in 1846 as part of the Kutaisi Governorate on the territory of the historical region of Imereti during the time of the Russian Empire. In 1918, the Kutaisi Governorate including the Kutaisi uezd was incorporated into the Democratic Republic of Georgia.

== Administrative divisions ==
The subcounties (uchastoks) of the Kutaisi uezd in 1913 were:

Name	1912 population	Area
Bagdadskiy uchastok (Багдадскій участокъ)	52,770	1,255.75 square versts (1,429.12 km^{2}; 551.79 mi^{2})
Kutaisskiy uchastok (Кутаисскій участокъ)	37,791	449.11 square versts (511.12 km^{2}; 197.34 mi^{2})
Samtredskiy uchastok (Самтредскій участокъ)	49,629	354.96 square versts (403.97 km^{2}; 155.97 mi^{2})
Tkvibulskiy uchastok (Тквибульскій участокъ)	34,123	544.74 square versts (619.95 km^{2}; 239.36 mi^{2})
Khonskiy uchastok (Хонскій участокъ)	42,417	438.08 square versts (498.56 km^{2}; 192.50 mi^{2})

== Demographics ==
=== Russian Empire Census ===
According to the Russian Empire Census, the Kutaisi uezd had a population of 221,665 on 28 January [O.S. 15 January] 1897, including 113,848 men and 107,817 women. The majority of the population indicated Imeretian to be their mother tongue, with significant Georgian and Russian speaking minorities:

Linguistic composition of the Kutaisi uezd in 1897
Language	Native speakers	%
Imeretian	148,003	66.77
Georgian	60,278	27.19
Russian	4,085	1.84
Jewish	3,614	1.63
Mingrelian	1,738	0.78
Armenian	1,331	0.60
Ukrainian	642	0.29
Polish	531	0.24
Greek	351	0.16
German	161	0.07
Lithuanian	146	0.07
Turkish	109	0.05
Tatar (Note: Before 1918, Azerbaijanis were generally known as "Tatars". This term, employed by the Russians, referred to Turkic-speaking Muslims of the South Caucasus. After 1918, with the establishment of the Azerbaijan Democratic Republic and "especially during the Soviet era", the Tatar group identified itself as "Azerbaijani".)	72	0.03
Kazi-Kumukh	59	0.03
Ossetian	48	0.02
Svan	45	0.02
Persian	42	0.02
Abkhaz	29	0.01
Avar-Andean	28	0.01
Romanian	13	0.01
Belarusian	9	0.00
English	5	0.00
Estonian	4	0.00
Kurdish	1	0.00
Other	321	0.14
TOTAL	221,665	100.00

=== Kavkazskiy kalendar ===
According to the 1917 publication of Kavkazskiy kalendar, the Kutaisi uezd had a population of 291,969 on 14 January [O.S. 1 January] 1916, including 156,683 men and 135,286 women, 273,021 of whom were the permanent population, and 18,948 were temporary residents:

Nationality	Urban		Rural		TOTAL	
Nationality	Number	%	Number	%	Number	%
Georgians	33,843	58.20	230,862	98.74	264,705	90.66
Jews	10,479	18.02	2,204	0.94	12,683	4.34
Russians	10,975	18.87	648	0.28	11,623	3.98
Armenians	1,845	3.17	93	0.04	1,938	0.66
Asiatic Christians	681	1.17	0	0.00	681	0.23
Other Europeans	233	0.40	1	0.00	234	0.08
Shia Muslims (Note: Primarily Tatars.)	95	0.16	10	0.00	105	0.04
TOTAL	58,151	100.00	233,818	100.00	291,969	100.00

== Bibliography ==
- Bournoutian, George A. (2018). Armenia and Imperial Decline: The Yerevan Province, 1900–1914. Milton Park, Abingdon, Oxon: Routledge. ISBN 978-1-351-06260-2. OCLC 1037283914.
- Hovannisian, Richard G. (1971). The Republic of Armenia. Vol. 1: The First Year, 1918–1919. Berkeley: University of California Press. ISBN 978-0520019843.
- Кавказский календарь на 1913 год [Caucasian calendar for 1913] (in Russian) (68th ed.). Tiflis: Tipografiya kantselyarii Ye.I.V. na Kavkaze, kazenny dom. 1913. Archived from the original on 19 April 2022.
- Кавказский календарь на 1917 год [Caucasian calendar for 1917] (in Russian) (72nd ed.). Tiflis: Tipografiya kantselyarii Ye.I.V. na Kavkaze, kazenny dom. 1917. Archived from the original on 4 November 2021.
- Tsutsiev, Arthur (2014). Atlas of the Ethno-Political History of the Caucasus (PDF). Translated by Nora Seligman Favorov. New Haven: Yale University Press. ISBN 9780300153088. Archived (PDF) from the original on 17 June 2023.
