= Senaki uezd =

County in Caucasus, Russian Empire

Coordinates: 42°16′8″N 42°4′45″E

Senaki uezd Сенакскій уѣздъ
- Uezd
- Coat of arms

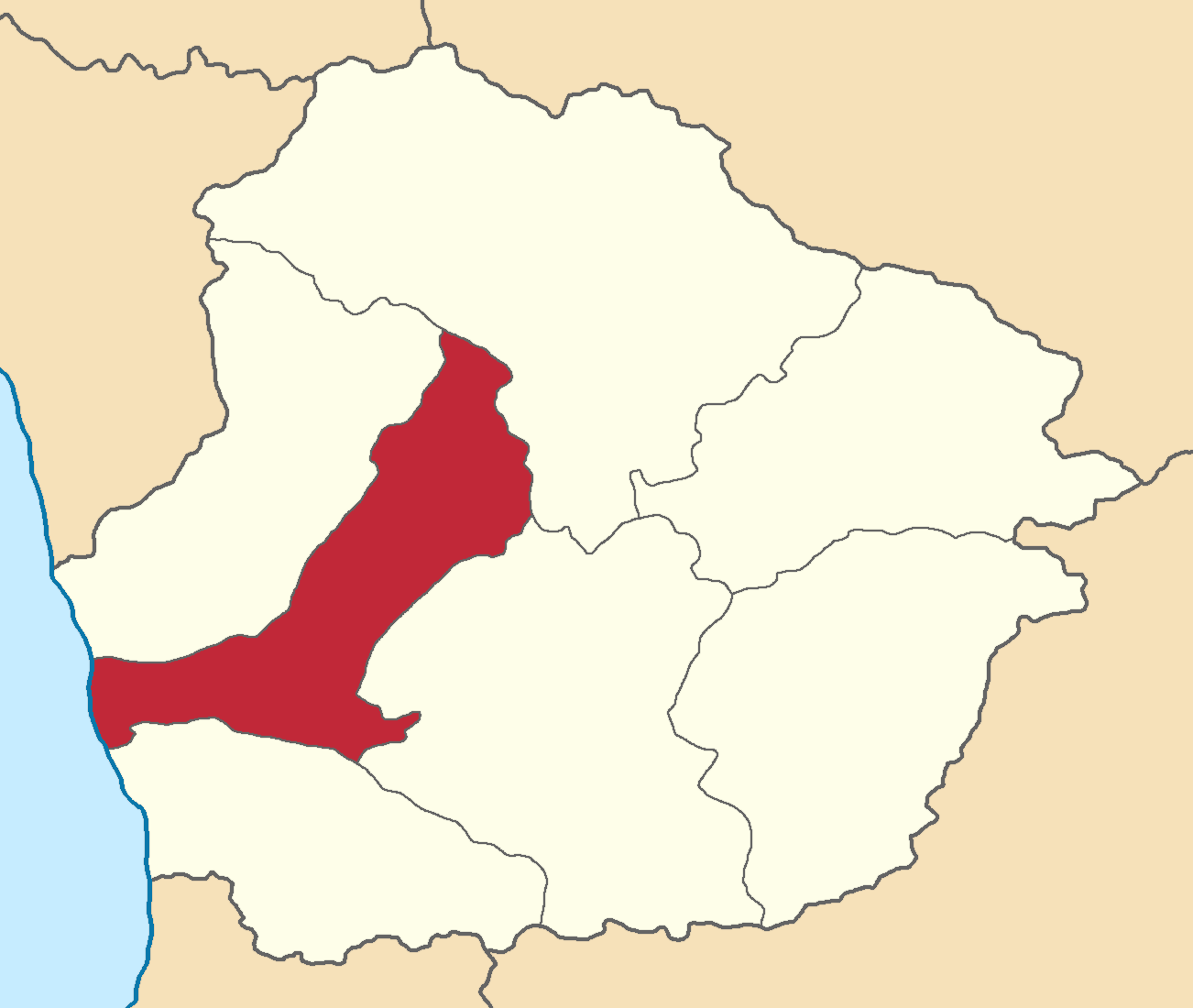
- Location in the Kutais Governorate
- Country: Russian Empire
- Viceroyalty: Caucasus
- Governorate: Kutaisi
- Established: 1867
- Abolished: 1930
- Capital: Senaki

Area
  - Total: 2,127.27 km^{2} (821.34 sq mi)

Population (1916)
  - Total: 159,678
  - Density: 75.0624/km^{2} (194.411/sq mi)
  - Urban: 11.73%
  - Rural: 88.27%

The Senaki uezd (Note: Russian: Сена́кскій уѣ́здъ, romanized: Senáksky uyézd; Georgian: სენაკის მაზრა, romanized: senak'is mazra) was a county (uezd) of the Kutaisi Governorate of the Caucasus Viceroyalty of the Russian Empire. It bordered the Zugdidi uezd to the west, the Lechkhumi uezd to the north, the Kutaisi uezd to the east, and the Ozurgeti uezd to the south. The area of the uezd corresponded to most of the contemporary Samegrelo-Zemo Svaneti region of Georgia. The Senaki uezd was eponymously named for its administrative center, Senaki.

== History ==
The Senaki uezd was formed in 1846 as part of the Kutaisi Governorate on the territory of the historical region of Samegrelo during the time of the Russian Empire. In 1918, the Kutaisi Governorate including the Senaki uezd was incorporated into part of the Democratic Republic of Georgia.

== Administrative divisions ==
The subcounties (uchastoks) of the Senaki uezd in 1913 were as follows:

Name	1912 population
Abashskiy uchastok (Абашскій участокъ)	20,740
Bandzinskiy uchastok (Бандзинскій участокъ)	15,246
Martvilskiy uchastok (Мартвильскій участокъ)	20,218
Senakskiy uchastok (Сенакскій участокъ)	7,587

== Demographics ==
=== Russian Empire Census ===
According to the Russian Empire Census, the Senaki uezd had a population of 115,785 on 28 January [O.S. 15 January] 1897, including 58,585 men and 57,200 women. The majority of the population indicated Mingrelian to be their mother tongue, with a significant Georgian speaking minority.

Language	Native speakers	%
Mingrelian	96,851	83.65
Georgian	14,338	12.38
Russian	1,395	1.20
Imeretian	895	0.77
Armenian	448	0.39
Jewish	448	0.39
Greek	401	0.35
Polish	175	0.15
Turkish	173	0.15
Ukrainian	124	0.11
English	85	0.07
Lithuanian	72	0.06
German	71	0.06
Tatar (Note: Before 1918, Azerbaijanis were generally known as "Tatars". This term, employed by the Russians, referred to Turkic-speaking Muslims of the South Caucasus. After 1918, with the establishment of the Azerbaijan Democratic Republic and "especially during the Soviet era", the Tatar group identified itself as "Azerbaijani".)	64	0.06
Svan	63	0.05
Abkhaz	24	0.02
Romanian	17	0.01
Kurdish	3	0.00
Ossetian	3	0.00
Persian	2	0.00
Avar-Andean	1	0.00
Belarusian	1	0.00
Estonian	1	0.00
Other	130	0.11
TOTAL	115,785	100.00

=== Kavkazskiy kalendar ===
According to the 1917 publication of Kavkazskiy kalendar, the Senaki uezd had a population of 159,678 on 14 January [O.S. 1 January] 1916, including 86,448 men and 73,230 women, 149,112 of whom were the permanent population, and 10,566 were temporary residents:

Nationality	Urban		Rural		TOTAL	
Nationality	Number	%	Number	%	Number	%
Georgians	12,441	66.42	139,303	98.83	151,744	95.03
Russians	2,836	15.14	4	0.00	2,840	1.78
Jews	847	4.52	1,639	1.16	2,486	1.56
Armenians	1,529	8.16	0	0.00	1,529	0.96
Asiatic Christians	769	4.11	0	0.00	769	0.48
Other Europeans	239	1.28	0	0.00	239	0.15
Sunni Muslims (Note: Primarily Turco-Tatars.)	70	0.37	0	0.00	70	0.04
North Caucasians	0	0.00	1	0.00	1	0.00
TOTAL	18,731	100.00	140,947	100.00	159,678	100.00

== Bibliography ==
- Bournoutian, George A. (2018). Armenia and Imperial Decline: The Yerevan Province, 1900–1914. Milton Park, Abingdon, Oxon: Routledge. ISBN 978-1-351-06260-2. OCLC 1037283914.
- Hovannisian, Richard G. (1971). The Republic of Armenia. Vol. 1: The First Year, 1918–1919. Berkeley: University of California Press. ISBN 978-0520019843.
- Кавказский календарь на 1913 год [Caucasian calendar for 1913] (in Russian) (68th ed.). Tiflis: Tipografiya kantselyarii Ye.I.V. na Kavkaze, kazenny dom. 1913. Archived from the original on 19 April 2022.
- Кавказский календарь на 1917 год [Caucasian calendar for 1917] (in Russian) (72nd ed.). Tiflis: Tipografiya kantselyarii Ye.I.V. na Kavkaze, kazenny dom. 1917. Archived from the original on 4 November 2021.
- Tsutsiev, Arthur (2014). Atlas of the Ethno-Political History of the Caucasus (PDF). Translated by Nora Seligman Favorov. New Haven: Yale University Press. ISBN 9780300153088. Archived (PDF) from the original on 17 June 2023.
