= Tuapsinsky okrug =

Coordinates: 44°06′16″N 39°04′38″E

Tuapsinsky okrug Туапсинскій округъ
- Okrug
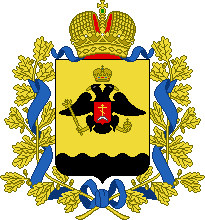
- Coat of arms

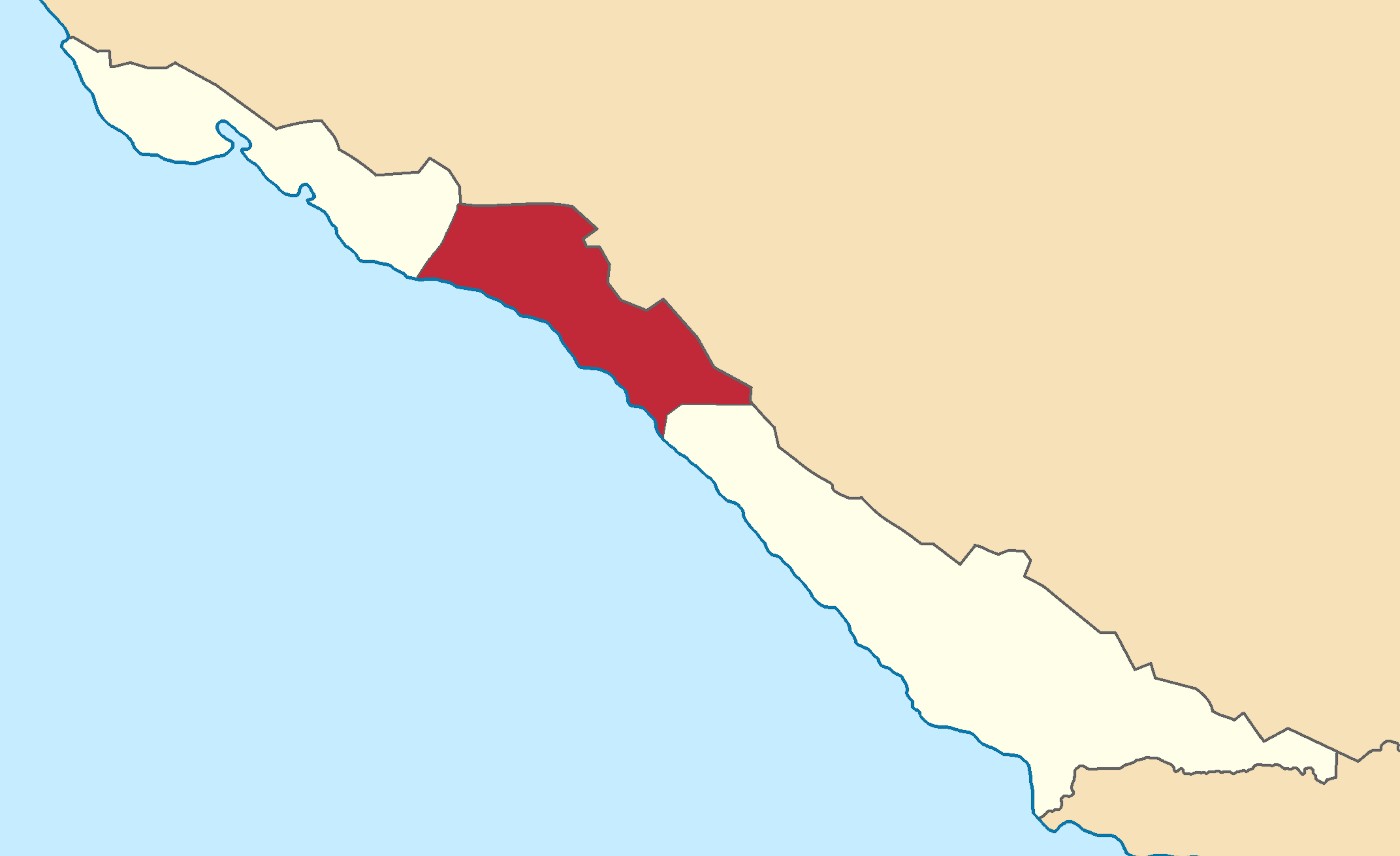
- Location in the Black Sea Governorate
- Country: Russian Empire
- Viceroyalty: Caucasus
- Governorate: Black Sea
- Established: 1849
- Abolished: 1917
- Capital: Tuapse

Area
  - Total: 1,777.49 km^{2} (686.29 sq mi)

Population (1916)
  - Total: 40,365
  - Density: 22.709/km^{2} (58.816/sq mi)
  - Urban: 44.14%
  - Rural: 55.86%

The Tuapsinsky okrug (Russian: Туапси́нскій о́кругъ, romanized: Tuapsínsky ókrug) was a district (okrug) of the Black Sea Governorate of the Caucasus Viceroyalty of the Russian Empire. It bordered the Kuban Oblast to the north, the Novorossiysky okrug to the west, the Sochinsky okrug to the east, and the Black Sea to the south. The area of the Tuapsinsky okrug mostly corresponds to the Krasnodar Krai region of Russia. The district was eponymously named for its administrative centre, Tuapse.

== Demographics ==
=== Russian Empire Census ===
According to the Russian Empire Census, the Tuapsinsky okrug had a population of 9,051, including 5,249 men and 3,802 women. The plurality of the population indicated Russian to be their mother tongue, with significant Ukrainian, Armenian, and Circassian speaking minorities.

Linguistic composition of the Tuapsinsky okrug in 1897
Language	Native speakers	%
Russian	2,782	30.74
Ukrainian	2,170	23.98
Armenian	1,689	18.66
Circassian	1,179	13.03
Greek	375	4.14
Czech	269	2.97
Romanian	144	1.59
Polish	83	0.92
German	82	0.91
Turkish	80	0.88
Persian	52	0.57
Imeretian	35	0.39
Georgian	30	0.33
Belarusian	22	0.24
Mingrelian	15	0.17
Jewish	11	0.12
Tatar (Note: Before 1918, Azerbaijanis were generally known as "Tatars". This term, employed by the Russians, referred to Turkic-speaking Muslims of the South Caucasus. After 1918, with the establishment of the Azerbaijan Democratic Republic and "especially during the Soviet era", the Tatar group identified itself as "Azerbaijani".)	3	0.03
Estonian	2	0.02
Other	28	0.31
TOTAL	9,051	100.00

=== Kavkazskiy kalendar ===
According to the 1917 publication of Kavkazskiy kalendar, the Tuapsinsky okrug had a population of 40,365 on 14 January [O.S. 1 January] 1916, including 25,053 men and 15,312 women, 15,642 of whom were the permanent population, and 24,723 were temporary residents:

Nationality	Urban		Rural		TOTAL	
Nationality	Number	%	Number	%	Number	%
Russians	11,634	65.30	15,262	67.69	26,896	66.63
Asiatic Christians	3,407	19.12	1,924	8.53	5,331	13.21
North Caucasians	250	1.40	2,606	11.56	2,856	7.08
Armenians	1,036	5.81	1,803	8.00	2,839	7.03
Other Europeans	1,073	6.02	751	3.33	1,824	4.52
Shia Muslims (Note: Primarily Tatars.)	333	1.87	195	0.86	528	1.31
Jews	77	0.43	0	0.00	77	0.19
Sunni Muslims (Note: Primarily Turco-Tatars.)	7	0.04	7	0.03	14	0.03
TOTAL	17,817	100.00	22,548	100.00	40,365	100.00

== Bibliography ==
- Bournoutian, George A. (2018). Armenia and Imperial Decline: The Yerevan Province, 1900–1914. Milton Park, Abingdon, Oxon: Routledge. ISBN 978-1-351-06260-2. OCLC 1037283914.
- Hovannisian, Richard G. (1971). The Republic of Armenia. Vol. 1: The First Year, 1918–1919. Berkeley: University of California Press. ISBN 978-0520019843.
- Кавказский календарь на 1917 год [Caucasian calendar for 1917] (in Russian) (72nd ed.). Tiflis: Tipografiya kantselyarii Ye.I.V. na Kavkaze, kazenny dom. 1917. Archived from the original on 4 November 2021.
- Tsutsiev, Arthur (2014). Atlas of the Ethno-Political History of the Caucasus (PDF). Translated by Nora Seligman Favorov. New Haven: Yale University Press. ISBN 9780300153088. Archived (PDF) from the original on 17 June 2023.
