= Black Sea Governorate =

Governorate of the Russian Empire

Coordinates: 44.7167°N 37.7667°E

Black Sea Governorate Черноморская губернія
- Governorate
- Coat of arms

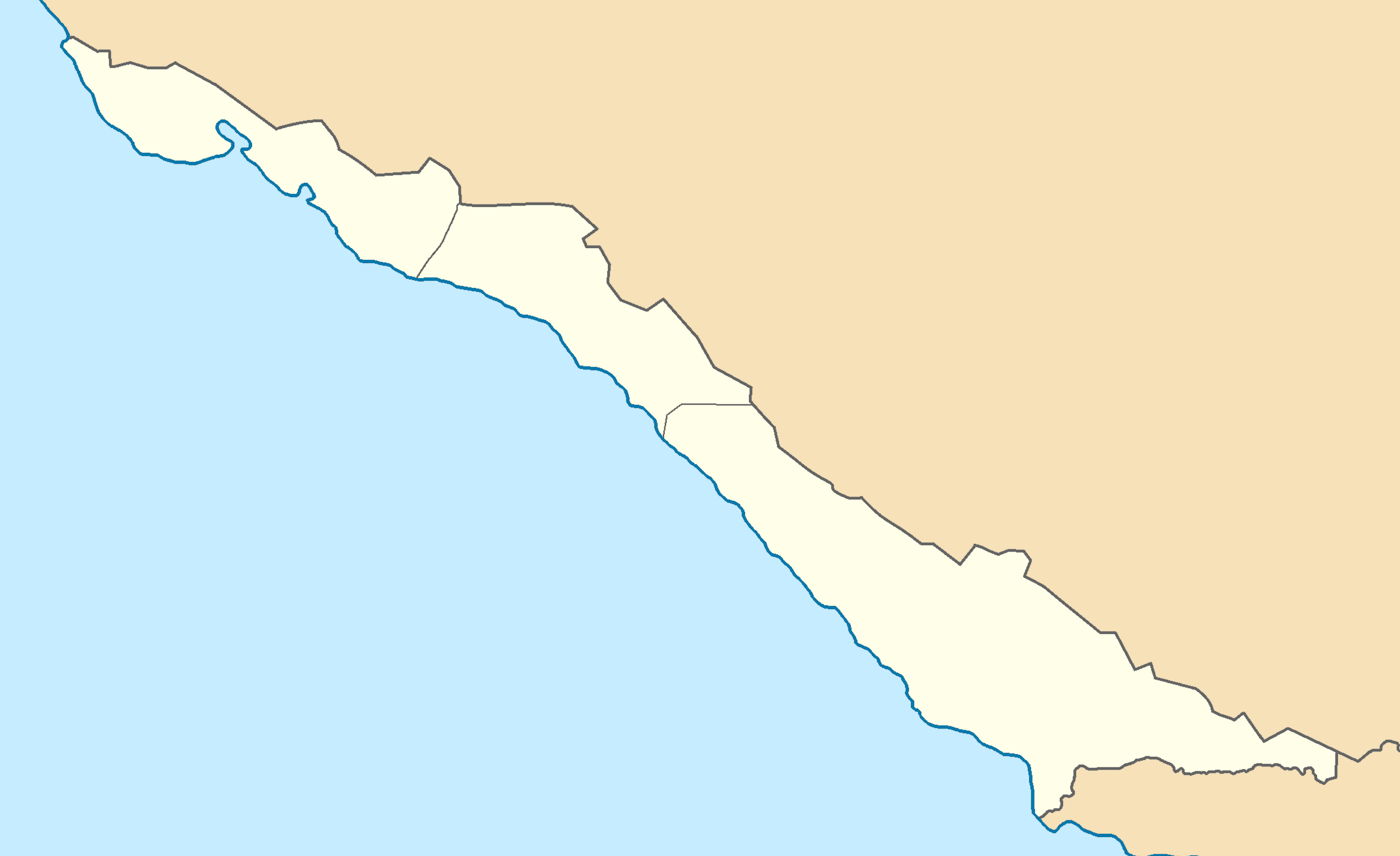
- Administrative map of the Black Sea Governorate
- Country: Russian Empire
- Viceroyalty: Caucasus
- Established: 1849
- Abolished: 1917
- Capital: Novorossiysk

Area
  - Total: 6,675.68 km^{2} (2,577.49 sq mi)

Population (1916)
  - Total: 178,306
  - Density: 26.7098/km^{2} (69.1780/sq mi)
  - Urban: 46.39%
  - Rural: 53.61%

The Black Sea Governorate (Note: Russian: Черномо́рская губе́рнія, romanized: Chernomórskaya gubérniya) was an administrative-territorial unit (guberniya) of the Caucasus Viceroyalty of the Russian Empire, established in 1896 on the territory of the Black Sea Okrug of the Kuban Oblast. The administrative center of the governorate was the Black Sea port of Novorossiysk. In 1905, the population of the governorate was approximately 70,000 and its area was 6,455 square versts (7,346 km^{2}; 2,836 mi^{2}), making it the smallest Russian governorate by both measures. The governorate ceased to exist when the Black Sea Soviet Republic was established on its territory in the spring of 1918—later the governorate was incorporated into the Kuban-Black Sea Oblast of the Russian SFSR in March 1920.

== Administrative divisions ==
The districts (okrugs) of the Black Sea Governorate in 1917 were as follows:

Name	Administrative centre			Population		Area
Name		1897	1916	1897	1916	Area
Novorossiysky okrug (Новороссійскій округъ)	Novorossiysk	16,869	51,651	34,908	75,021	999.13 square versts (1,137.07 km^{2}; 439.03 mi^{2})
Sochinsky okrug (Сочинскій округъ)	Sochi	1,392	13,254	13,519	62,920	3,304.84 square versts (3,761.11 km^{2}; 1,452.17 mi^{2})
Tuapsinsky okrug (Туапсинскій округъ)	Tuapse	1,352	17,817	9,051	40,365	1,561.86 square versts (1,777.49 km^{2}; 686.29 mi^{2})

== Demographics ==
=== Russian Empire Census ===
According to the Russian Empire Census, the Black Sea Governorate had a population of 57,478 on 28 January [O.S. 16 January] 1897, including 34,776 men and 22,702 women. The plurality of the population indicated Russian to be their mother tongue, with significant Ukrainian, Armenian, and Greek speaking minorities.

Linguistic composition of the Black Sea Governorate in 1897
Native language	Number	%
Russian	24,635	42.86
Ukrainian	9,252	16.10
Armenian	6,285	10.93
Greek	5,969	10.38
Circassian	1,939	3.37
Czech	1,290	2.24
Jewish	990	1.72
Georgian	967	1.68
Romanian	923	1.61
Estonian	791	1.38
German	748	1.30
Polish	731	1.27
Belarusian	659	1.15
Turkish	650	1.13
Mingrelian	304	0.53
Tatar (Note: Before 1918, Azerbaijanis were generally known as "Tatars". This term, employed by the Russians, referred to Turkic-speaking Muslims of the South Caucasus. After 1918, with the establishment of the Azerbaijan Democratic Republic and "especially during the Soviet era", the Tatar group identified itself as "Azerbaijani".)	291	0.51
Persian	210	0.37
Imeretian	158	0.27
Other	686	1.19
TOTAL	57,478	100.00

Religious composition of the Black Sea Governorate in 1897
Faith	Male	Female	Both	
Faith	Male	Female	Number	%
Eastern Orthodox	26,085	16,980	43,065	74.92
Armenian Apostolic	3,506	2,635	6,141	10.68
Muslim	2,072	1,031	3,103	5.40
Roman Catholic	1,485	944	2,429	4.23
Lutheran	835	580	1,415	2.46
Judaism	567	461	1,028	1.79
Old Believer	53	36	89	0.15
Armenian Catholic	58	24	82	0.14
Reformed	70	1	71	0.12
Karaite	18	6	24	0.04
Anglican	4	2	6	0.01
Mennonite	0	2	2	0.00
Baptist	1	0	1	0.00
Other Christian denomination	5	0	5	0.01
Other non-Christian denomination	17	0	17	0.03
TOTAL	34,776	22,702	57,478	100.00

Linguistic composition of urban settlements in the Black Sea Governorate in 1897
Urban settlement	Russian		Ukrainian		Greek		TOTAL
Urban settlement	Number	%	Number	%	Number	%	TOTAL
Novorossiysk	10,860	64.27	2,177	12.88	931	5.51	16,897
Tuapse	827	59.41	116	8.33	189	13.58	1,392
Sochi	513	37.94	269	19.90	26	1.92	1,352
TOTAL	12,200	62.11	2,562	13.04	1,146	5.83	19,641

=== Kavkazskiy kalendar ===
According to the 1917 publication of Kavkazskiy kalendar, the Black Sea Governorate had a population of 178,306 on 14 January [O.S. 1 January] 1916, including 104,488 men and 73,818 women, 108,893 of whom were the permanent population, and 69,413 were temporary residents:

Nationality	Urban		Rural		TOTAL	
Nationality	Number	%	Number	%	Number	%
Russians	65,582	79.28	54,339	56.85	119,921	67.26
Other Europeans	6,246	7.55	15,107	15.80	21,353	11.98
Armenians	2,347	2.84	15,712	16.44	18,059	10.13
Georgians	1,750	2.12	4,336	4.54	6,086	3.41
Asiatic Christians	3,407	4.12	1,932	2.02	5,339	2.99
North Caucasians	672	0.81	3,426	3.58	4,104	2.30
Jews	1,784	2.16	9	0.01	1,793	1.01
Shia Muslims (Note: Primarily Tatars.)	922	1.11	649	0.68	1,571	0.88
Sunni Muslims (Note: Primarily Turco-Tatars.)	12	0.01	56	0.06	68	0.04
Roma	0	0.00	12	0.01	12	0.01
TOTAL	82,722	100.00	95,584	100.00	178,306	100.00

== Bibliography ==
- Bournoutian, George A. (2018). Armenia and Imperial Decline: The Yerevan Province, 1900–1914. Milton Park, Abingdon, Oxon: Routledge. ISBN 978-1-351-06260-2. OCLC 1037283914.
- Hovannisian, Richard G. (1971). The Republic of Armenia. Vol. 1: The First Year, 1918–1919. Berkeley: University of California Press. ISBN 978-0520019843.
- Кавказский календарь на 1917 год [Caucasian calendar for 1917] (in Russian) (72nd ed.). Tiflis: Tipografiya kantselyarii Ye.I.V. na Kavkaze, kazenny dom. 1917. Archived from the original on 4 November 2021.
- Tsutsiev, Arthur (2014). Atlas of the Ethno-Political History of the Caucasus (PDF). Translated by Nora Seligman Favorov. New Haven: Yale University Press. ISBN 9780300153088. Archived (PDF) from the original on 17 June 2023.
