= Eastern Armenia in the Last Decades of Persian Rule, 1807–1828 =

Eastern Armenia in the Last Decades of Persian Rule, 1807–1828: A Political and Socioeconomic Study of the Khanate of Erevan on the Eve of the Russian Conquest
- Author: George Bournoutian
- Publisher: Undena Publications
- Publication date: 1982
- Pages: 290
- ISBN: 978-0-89003-122-3
- OCLC: 9817867

Eastern Armenia in the Last Decades of Persian Rule, 1807–1828: A Political and Socioeconomic Study of the Khanate of Erevan on the Eve of the Russian Conquest is a book by George Bournoutian about the history of Eastern Armenia during the final few decades of Iranian i.e. Persian rule. The book focusses on the Erivan Khanate (i.e. province) of Qajar Iran.
