= Georgian dialects =

Georgian (ქართული kartuli) is a Kartvelian language spoken by about 4 million people, primarily in Georgia but also by indigenous communities in northern Turkey and Azerbaijan, and the diaspora, such as in Russia, Turkey, Iran, Europe, and North America. It is a highly standardized language, with established literary and linguistic norms dating back to the 5th century.

There are at least 18 dialects of the language. Standard Georgian is largely based on the prestige Kartlian dialect. It has over centuries wiped out significant regional linguistic differences within Georgia, particularly through the centralized educational system and the mass media. Dialects still retain their unique features in terms of phonology, morphology, syntax, and vocabulary, but they are virtually entirely intelligible with each other. The three other Kartvelian languages—Mingrelian, Svan and Laz—are sisters to Georgian, but are only partly intelligible to speakers of Standard Georgian or other Georgian dialects.

Some of the basic variations among the Georgian dialects include:

- The presence of glides [j] (ჲ) and [w] (ჳ) before certain vowels;
- The presence of qʰ (ჴ) and ʔ (ჸ) sounds;
- Distinction between long and short vowels;
- Extra vowel sounds not found in Standard Georgian;
- The usage of n (ნ) plural form;
- Plural adjectival forms;
- Non-standard verb forms;
- Archaisms and borrowings from neighboring languages not found in Standard Georgian.
- Different stress patterns;

== Classification ==
Dialects of the Georgian language: Eastern dialects: Ingiloian (in Azerbaijan) Kakhetian Tianetian Fereydanian (not shown) is spoken in Fereydunshahr, Iran Northwest dialects Imeretian Rachvelian Lechkhumi Southwest dialects Gurian Adjarian Imerkhevian (in Turkey) Central dialects Kartlian Samtskhian Javakhetian Northeast dialects Tushetian Mokhevian Mtiuletian Khevsuretian Pshavian

The Georgian dialects are classified according to their geographic distribution, reflecting a traditional ethnographic subdivision of the Georgian people. Beyond the Western and Eastern categories, some scholars have also suggested a Southern group. These can be further subdivided into five main dialect groups as proposed by Gigineishvili, Topuria, and K'avtaradze (1961):

=== Northwest dialects ===
- Imeretian (Imeruli, იმერული) in Imereti
- Lechkhumian (Lečkhumuri, ლეჩხუმური) in Lechkhumi
- Rachan (Račuli, რაჭული) in Racha

=== Southwest dialects ===
- Gurian (Guruli, გურული) in Guria
- Adjarian (Ačaruli, აჭარული) in Adjara
- Imerkhevian (Imerkheuli, იმერხეული) in Imerkhevi (Turkey)

=== Central dialects ===
The Central dialects, sometimes considered part of the Eastern group, are spoken in central and southern Georgia, and provide the basis for Standard Georgian language.

- Kartlian (Kartluri, ქართლური) in Kartli
- Meskhian (Meskhuri, მესხური) in Meskheti
- Javakhian (Javakhuri, ჯავახური) in Javakheti

=== Northeast dialects ===
This group is spoken by the mountaineers in northeast Georgia.

- Mokhevian (Mokheuri, მოხეური), spoken in Khevi
- Mtiuletian-Gudamaqrian (Mtiulur-Gudamaqruli, მთიულურ-გუდამაყრული) in Mtiuleti and Gudamaqari
- Khevsurian (Khevsuruli, ხევსურული) in Khevsureti
- Pshavian (Phšauri, ფშაური) in Pshavi
- Tushetian (Tušuri, თუშური) in Tusheti

=== Eastern dialects ===
Two of these dialects, Ingiloan and Fereidanian, are spoken outside Georgia, the former by the indigenous Georgians in northwest Azerbaijan, and the latter by the descendants of the 17th-19th century Georgian deportees and migrants in Iran.

- Kakhetian (Kakhuri, კახური) in Kakheti
- Tianetian (Tianeturi, თიანეთური) in Ertso-Tianeti
- Ingiloan (Ingilouri, ინგილოური) in Saingilo (Azerbaijan)
- Fereydanian (Phereidnuli, ფერეიდნული) in Fereydan (Iran)

=== Other dialects ===
- The obsolescent Kizlar-Mozdokian dialect, was spoken in the north central Caucasian areas of Kizlyar and Mozdok by descendants of those Georgians who fled the Ottoman occupation of Georgia in the early 18th century. It was technically a mixture of various Georgian dialects laden with Russian loanwords. Subsequently, the group was largely Russified and the dialect became extinct.
- Judaeo-Georgian is a language spoken by the Georgian Jews. Largely Georgian phonetically, morphologically, and syntactically, and mixed Georgian-Hebrew lexically, it is considered by some not to be a distinct language but rather a dialect of Georgian.
