= George Bournoutian =

Iranian-American professor and historian (1943–2021)

George A. Bournoutian
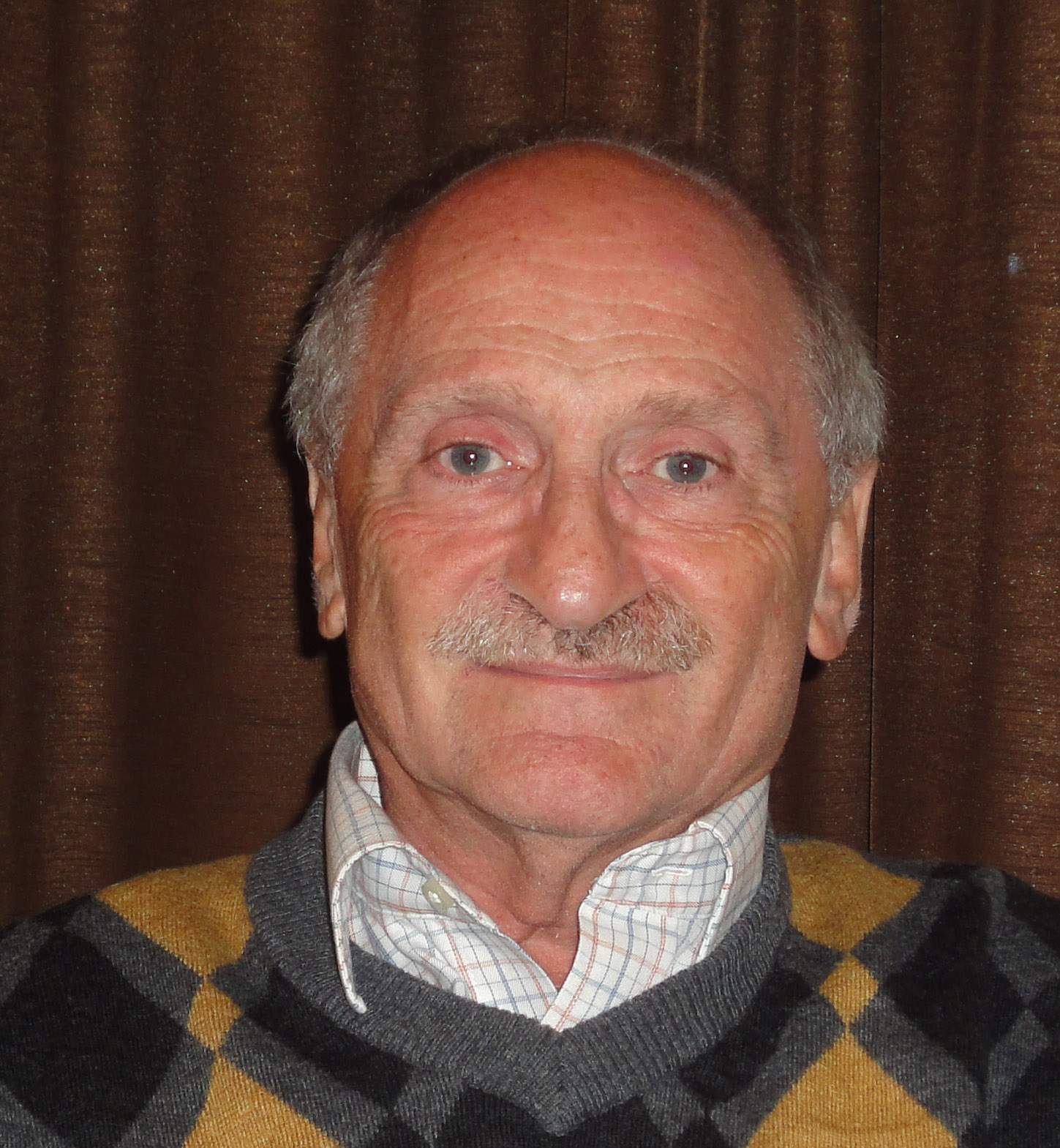
- Born: September 25, 1943; Isfahan, Iran
- Died: August 22, 2021 (aged 77); New Jersey, U.S.
- Occupation: Professor

George A. Bournoutian (Armenian: Ջորջ Բուռնութեան; Persian: جورج بورنوتیان; 25 September 1943 – 22 August 2021) was an Iranian-American professor, historian, and author of Armenian descent. He was a professor of history and the author of over 30 books, particularly focusing on Armenian history, Iran and the Caucasus. He taught Iranian history at UCLA, and Armenian history at Columbia University, Tufts University, New York University, Rutgers University, the University of Connecticut, Ramapo College, and Glendale Community College and Russian and Soviet history at Iona College. Bournoutian was one of the 40 editors of the Encyclopaedia Iranica.

== Biography ==
George Bournoutian was born in Isfahan, Iran into an Armenian family. He grew up in Iran, and he received his high school diploma from the Andisheh (Don Bosco) institution in Tehran. He immigrated to the United States in 1964. He received his M.A. degree in 1971 and his Ph.D. in history with a focus on Armenian and Iranian studies in 1976 at UCLA. His dissertation was titled "Eastern Armenia on the Eve of the Russian Conquest," which was published as a book in 1982 and republished in 1992.

He was a member of the Middle Eastern Studies Association, Association for the Advancement of Slavic Studies, Iranian Studies Association, Society for Armenian Studies, and Association Internationale des Etudes Armeniennes.

George Bournoutian was also an avid world traveler. He was fluent in English, Armenian, Persian, Russian, and Polish, and had a reading command of French. He accompanied his senior and graduate students on annual trips to Armenia and Transcaucasia, the Middle East, Africa, Southeast Asia, Australia, South and Central America and Antarctica.

== Honours ==
- Recipient NDEA Title VI Fellowship (1973–1975)
- Recipient of IREX Fellowship, USSR (1973–1974)
- Recipient of Mellon Post-Doctoral Fellowship (Columbia University, 1978–1980)
- Ranked top merit award seven years at Iona College
- Recipient of twenty publication and research grants (1990–2010)
- Recipient of numerous travel and research grants from Iona College

== Degrees ==
1970 - BA - UCLA - Thesis - The Armenian Community of Isfahan (Iran) in the 17th Century - Published in 2 parts - The Armenian Review 1971–1972

1971 - MA - UCLA - Thesis - The Rise of National and Political Consciousness among the Armenian, Georgian and Turko-Tatar Peoples and Their Role in the Russian Revolution of 1905-1907 - Published in The Armenian Review in 1973.

1976 - PhD - UCLA - Eastern Armenia on the Eve of the Russian Conquest

== Publications ==
- From the Kur to the Aras: A Military History of Russia's Move into the South Caucasus and the First Russo-Iranian War, 1801-1813, Brill, 2020.
- A Concise History of the Armenian People (7th printing, 2018) Mazda Publishers
- Tarikh-e mokhtasar-e Maredom-e Armani. Persian Translation of a Concise History of the Armenian people. Tehran, 2019.
- Armenia and Imperial Decline: The Yerevan Province, 1900-1914. Routledge Pub, 2018.
- The 1820 Russian Survey of the Khanate of Shirvan, Gibb Memorial Series, Cambridge, 2016. Topic: A primary Source on the Demography and Economy of an Iranian Province Prior to its Annexation by Russia.
- The 1819 Russian Survey of the Khanate of Sheki, Mazda Pub. 2016. Topic: A Primary Source on the Demography and Economy of an Iranian Province Prior to its Annexation by Russia.
- The 1829-1832 Russian Surveys of the Khanate of Nakhichevan, Mazda Pub. 2016. A A Primary Source on the Demography a\nd Economy of an Iranian Province prior to its Annexation by Russia.
- Arumenia-jin no-Rekishi, Japanese Translation of A Concise History of the Armenian People, Tokyo, 2016
- From Tabriz to St. Petersburg: Iran's Mission of Apology to Russia in 1829. Mazda Pub, April 2014
- A History of the Armenian People: Prehistory to 1500 Ad (1993) Mazda Publishers
- The 1823 Russian Survey of the Karabagh Province: A Primary Source on the Demography and Economy of Karabagh in the Early 19th Century. 2011, 467pp. Second edition, 2012.
- Mawgez Tarikh al-Sha`b al-Armani. Arabic translation of A Concise History of the Armenian people, Cairo, 2012
- Hay Zhoghovrdi Hamarod Patmut`yun. Armenian translation of A Concise History of the Armenian People, Yerevan, 2012
- Kratkaia istoriia armianskogo naroda (Russian translation of A Concise History of the Armenian People, Yerevan, 2014.
- Ermeni Tarihi. Turkish Translation of A Concise History of the Armenian People, Aras Yayincilik: Istanbul, 2011 & 2016.
- Arak`el of Tabriz: Book of History (One-volume revised edition) [2010], xiii+637 cloth.
- A Brief History of the Aghuank` Region, 1702-1723 (Esayi Hasan Jalaleants`) [2009]. History of Ganje and Karabagh by Catholicos Esayi. xi+125 paper. Topic: History/Armenia, Iran, Azerbaijan.
- Jambr (Simeon of Erevan) [2009]. History of the Armenian Church to 1780 by Catholicos Simeon of Erevan. xv+519 paper.
- The Travel Accounts of Simeon of Poland (2007). Travel journal of an Armenian from Poland to Italy, Egypt, Syria, Holy Land, and Turkey. xiv+373, paperback.
- Historia Sucinta del Pueblo Armenio (2007). Spanish translation of A Concise History of the Armenian people ix+505, paper. Buenos Aires.
- Tigranes II and Rome (2007). English translation of H. Manandyan's classic work. xi+202, paper. Topic: History/Iran, Armenia and Rome in the first century BC.
- The History of Vardapet Arak`el of Tabriz (2 vols.), 2005–2006. xix+1-280; xx+281-619, paperback. [The most important primary source on the political and socioeconomic conditions of the territory of Armenia in the 17th century - Critical Text.]
- Two Chronicles on the History of Karabagh (2004), by Mirza Adigozal Beg and Mirza Yusuf. xvi+298, paper. Topic: History/Armenia, Iran, Azerbaijan.
- The Chronicle of Deacon Zak`aria of K`anak`er (2004), Chronicle of the Abbot of Hovhannavank Monastery on the condition in Armenia.xii+359, paper. Topic: History/Armenia, Iran, Georgia.
- The Journal of Zak`aria of Agulis (2003), journal of an Armenian silk merchant from Armenia who traveled to Europe via the Ottoman Empire. vii+243, paper. Topic: History/Armenia, Iran, Georgia, Ottoman Empire.
- A Concise History of the Armenian People (various editions). 2002–2012. ix+521, paper and cloth.
- Armenians and Russia: A Documentary Record, 1626-1796 (2001) OOP. Documents from the Archives of Russia, Armenia, and Georgia. xiv+512, cloth. Topic: History/Russia, Iran, Armenia, Georgia, Azerbaijan.
- History of the Wars, 1721-1738 (1999) by Abraham of Erevan. vi+111, paper.Topic: History/Iran, Armenia, Ottoman Empire, Afghanistan.
- The Chronicle of Abraham of Crete (1999) by Catholicos Abraham of Crete. vi+190, cloth. Critical Text. Topic: History/Iran-Armenia.
- Russia and the Armenians of Transcaucasia: A Documentary Record, 1797-1889 (1998): Documents from the Archives of Russia, Armenia, and Georgia. xv+578, cloth.
- A History of the Armenian People, Vol. II: 1500 to the Present (1994). viii+237, paper. Reprinted with corrections 1996, revised third edition 1998. OOP. Used as main text at a number of universities.
- A History of Qarabagh (1994) Mirza Jamal Javanshir. vi+157+62, cloth. (includes facsimile of original manuscript), OOP.
- A History of the Armenian People, Vol. I: Pre-History to 1500 A.D. (1993). xviii+174, paper. Reprinted with corrections in 1995, third edition 1997. OOP. Used as the main textbook at UCLA, Rutgers, Tufts, CSU-Fresno etc. Topic: History/Armenia.
- The Khanate of Erevan under Qajar Rule, 1795–1828. Persian Studies Series, number 13, Bibliotheca Persica, Iran Center, Columbia University, New York, 1992, pp. xxvii+355, cloth. OOP.
- Eastern Armenia in the Last Decades of Persian Rule, 1807-1828. Studies in Near Eastern Culture and Society, number 5, Von Grunebaum Center, UCLA, Undena, 1982, pp. xxii+290, cloth and paper. OOP. Topic: History/Armenia, Russia, Iran.
