= Gafar Raghib =

- Born: 1 November 1818; Shamakhi, Shirvan Khanate, Russian Empire
- Died: 30 November 1891 (aged 73); Shamakhi, Shemakha uezd, Baku Governorate, Russian Empire
- Occupation: Poet
- Writing career
- Language: Azerbaijani

Gafar Raghib (b. Shamakhi, Shirvan Khanate, Russian Empire; 1 November 1818 - d. Shamakhi, Shemakha uezd, Baku Governorate, Russian Empire; 30 November 1891) was an Azerbaijani poet of the 19th century, member of the Beyt-us-safa literary society.

== Life ==
Gafar Raghib was born on November 1, 1818, in Shamakhi into the family of Muhammad Said. He received his initial education in his hometown, and later engaged in trade. In the 1860s he joined the Beyt-us-safa literary circle. The main part of Raghib's literary heritage was lost in 1902 during the Shamakhi earthquake. Only five ghazals of the poet remain, recorded by Seyid Azim Shirvani. Raghib died on November 30, 1891.
