= Mirza Mahammad Musavvir =

Azerbaijani poet, artist and calligrapher (died 1901)

- Born: Qazvin, Qajar Iran
- Died: 1901; Baku, Baku uezd, Baku Governorate, Russian Empire
- Occupation: Poet, artist and calligrapher

Mirza Mahammad Musavvir (died 1901 in Baku, Baku uezd, Baku Governorate, Russian Empire) - was an Azerbaijani poet, artist and calligrapher of the 19th century, member of the literary society "Majmaus-shuara".

== Life ==
Mirza Mahammad Musavvir was born in the city of Qazvin and in 1876 moved to Baku, where he lived until the end of his life. He was an artist, practiced calligraphy, and also wrote poetry under the pseudonym “Musavvir”. He was a member of Majmaus-shuara, a group of famous poets at that time.

He became friends with another Azerbaijani poet, Seyid Azim Shirvani, and compared his work with the works of Mani and Chinese artists.

Mirza Mahammad died in 1901 in Baku.
