= Konstantin Tarkhan-Mouravi =

Russian general (1811–1869)

Knyaz Konstantin Tarkhan-Mouravi

Governor of Shamakhi
- In office 1857–1859
- Preceded by: Sergei Chelyaev
- Succeeded by: Transformed to Baku governorate

Governor of Baku
- In office 1859–1863
- Preceded by: Himself
- Succeeded by: Mikhail Kolyubakin

Personal details
- Born: 1811 Tiflis, Tiflis Governorate
- Died: February 6, 1869 (aged 57–58) Tiflis, Tiflis Governorate
- Noble family: Tarkhan-Mouravi

Military service
- Battles/wars: Russo-Persian War (1826–1828); Russo-Turkish War (1828–1829); Caucasian War; Crimean War

Konstantin Davidovich Tarkhan-Mouravi (1811–1869) was an Imperial Russian lieutenant general of Georgian noble origin who served as governor of Shamakhi and Baku (1857–1863).

== Background ==
Tarkhan-Mouravi was born in 1811 into a Georgian princely family of Tarkhan-Mouravi in Tiflis Governorate. His father was David Tarkhan Mouravi (1764–1839), his mother was Makrina Tsereteli (1790-1855).

== Career ==
He joined the Kherson Grenadier Regiment of the Separate Caucasian Corps as a private in 1826 and was promoted to non-commissioned officer the same year. He fought in the Russo-Persian War (1826–1828) and the Russo-Turkish War (1828–1829). On 19 April 1829, he was promoted to ensign for distinction in combat.

Between 1830 and 1833, he received several military honours:

- 19 January 1830: Order of St Anna, 4th class, "For Bravery"
- 16 June 1831: Order of St Anna, 3rd class with bow
- 27 July 1833: Order of St Vladimir, 4th class with bow

Following the dissolution of the Kherson Grenadier Regiment in 1834, its 1st Battalion, including Tarkhan-Mouravi, was transferred to the Georgian Grenadier Regiment. On 22 April 1838, he was promoted to lieutenant for distinction against the mountaineers of the Caucasus. On 2 March 1839, he received a gold sword inscribed "For Bravery". He was then promoted to staff captain and appointed governor of the town of Nukha in the Elisabethpol Governorate.

By 1845, he held the rank of captain and served as district chief of Quba uezd in the Caspian Oblast. Later that year, he was transferred to Shamakhi as district chief of Shamakhi uezd. In July 1846, he was promoted to major for "exceptionally diligent and zealous" service. By 1847, he was district chief of Shusha uezd in Shamakhi governorate.

=== Mid-career and Crimean War ===
On 22 March 1852, he was appointed to special duties under the commander of the Separate Caucasian Corps and was promoted to colonel on 14 November 1852. On 1 January 1854, he became commander of the Grenadier Regiment of Grand Duke Konstantin Nikolaevich.

During the Crimean War, his regiment distinguished itself at the Battle of Kurekdere. For his actions, he was awarded a bow to his existing Order of St George, 4th class, on 18 April 1855. The battle citation noted his leadership under fire and the storming of a heavily defended Turkish position despite a numerical disadvantage.

In March 1856, his brother, Iosif Tarkhan-Mouravi, succeeded him in command of the regiment. Konstantin was reassigned to the army infantry and attached to the Separate Caucasian Corps for special duties. That year, he received a badge for 25 years of flawless service, worn on the St George ribbon.

== Governorship ==
In 1857, he was appointed acting military governor of Shamakhi, replacing Major General Sergei Chelyaev. He assumed office in April, with imperial confirmation following on 15 May. He was promoted to major general and formally confirmed as governor on 17 April 1858.

On 30 May 1859, Shamakhi suffered a severe earthquake, destroying or damaging over 3,500 of its 5,400 buildings and killing or injuring 400 of its 30,000 residents. Viceroy Aleksandr Baryatinsky, citing the city's history of earthquakes, proposed relocating the provincial capital to Baku. Tarkhan-Mouravi objected, citing Baku's harsh climate, poor water supply, and health hazards, arguing it would cause more deaths over time than earthquakes in Shamakhi. However, German geologist Hermann Abich refuted this view, recommending the move. In September 1859, the transfer of provincial institutions to Baku was ordered, and on 6 December an imperial decree designated Baku as the new provincial capital.

Tarkhan-Mouravi remained in office as governor of the newly established Baku Governorate. He was awarded the Order of St Stanislaus, 1st class (8 September 1859), and the Order of St Anna, 1st class (25 October 1861). In 1861, a local branch of the Women’s Charitable Society named after St Nina was opened in Baku at his initiative.

=== Retirement and death ===
In 1863, he was reassigned to the Caucasian Army for special duties. He retired in July 1865 with the rank of lieutenant general. Tarkhan-Mouravi died on 6 February 1869.

== Conflict with Gasim bey Zakir ==
During his tenure in Shusha, Tarkhan-Mouravi was involved in a high-profile conflict with the prominent Azerbaijani satirical poet Gasim bey Zakir. Zakir, known for his sharp criticism of officials and his wide intellectual network, including figures like Mirza Fatali Akhundov and Ilia Orbeliani, had also made enemies among the regional elite. Tarkhan-Mouravi was considered one of his most hostile adversaries.

The conflict escalated in 1849 when Tarkhan-Mouravi accused Zakir of sheltering his fugitive relative, Behbud bey Javanshir, who was wanted by imperial authorities. Using this as a pretext, Tarkhan-Mouravi launched a raid on Zakir’s residence in the village of Xındırıstan with an armed detachment. Zakir’s son Najafgulu bey and nephew Iskandar bey were arrested on charges of aiding the fugitive and sent to prison in Shusha. Zakir and his entire household were also detained and imprisoned. Following the arrests, Tarkhan-Mouravi reportedly ordered the looting of Xındırıstan, leaving its residents in destitution. Behbud bey was later executed in prison. Despite Zakir’s repeated petitions to higher authorities protesting his unlawful detention, no official response was given. After spending nearly a year in Shusha prison without trial, Zakir was exiled to Baku. His relatives were sent further into internal exile, first to Tiflis, then to Voronezh and Kaluga.

Zakir continued to campaign for justice from Baku, appealing to allies within the bureaucracy such as Akhundov, Ismail bey Gutgashinli, and new Baku governor Mikhail Kolyubakin. These efforts eventually contributed to his release. The poet later referenced this persecution in his verse, naming Tarkhan-Mouravi among his chief tormentors.
