= Baku gradonachalstvo =

Coordinates: 40.3667°N 49.8352°E

Baku gradonachalstvo Бакинское градоначальство
- Gradonachalstvo
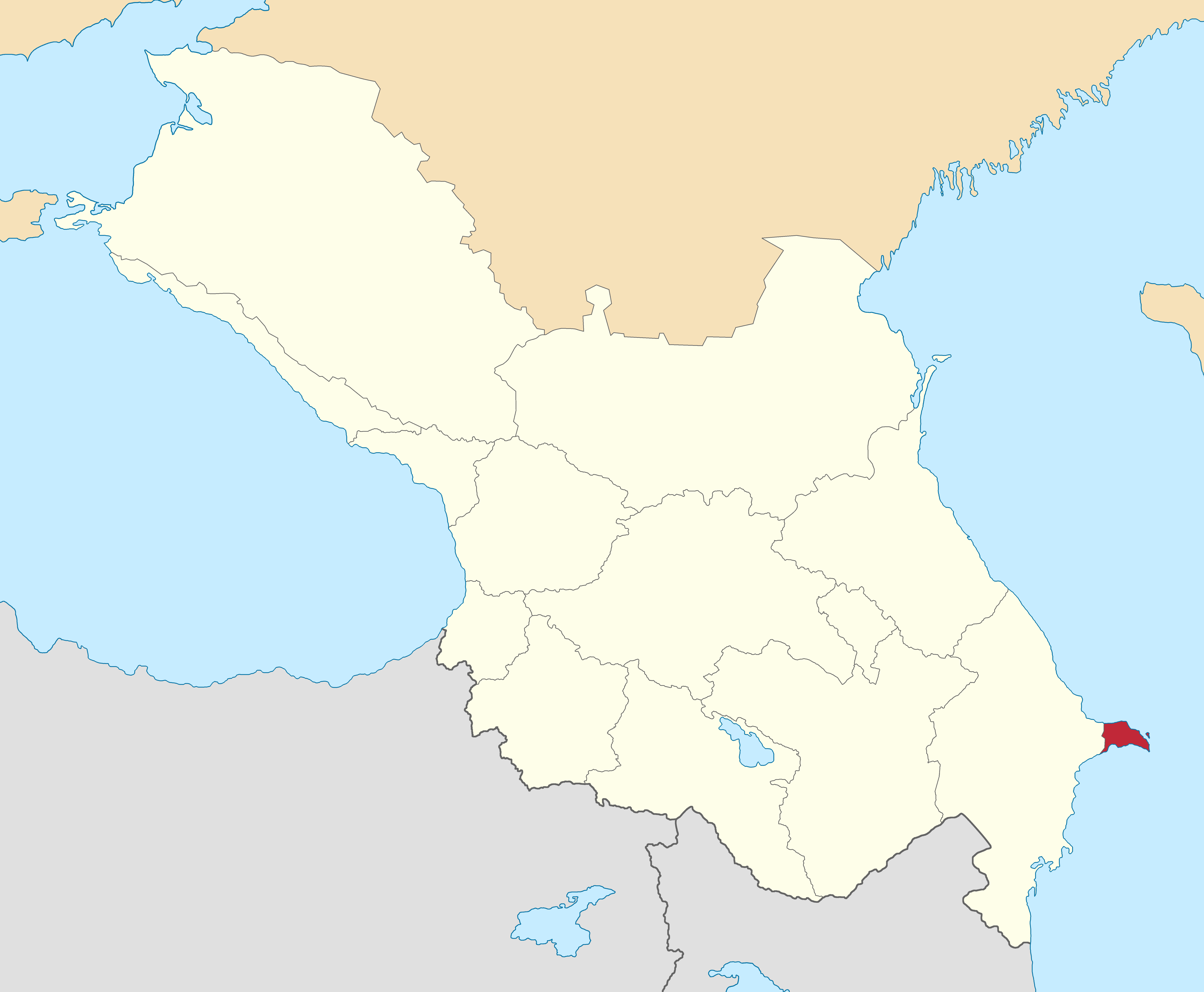
- Location in the Caucasus Viceroyalty
- Country: Russian Empire
- Viceroyalty: Caucasus
- Established: 1906
- Abolished: 1917
- Capital: Baku

Area
  - Total: 1,059.76 km^{2} (409.18 sq mi)

Population (1916)
  - Total: 405,829
  - Density: 382.944/km^{2} (991.821/sq mi)
  - Urban: 64.66%
  - Rural: 35.34%

The Baku gradonachalstvo (Note: Russian: Бакинское градоначальство, romanized: Bakinskoye gradonachalstvo [bəkʲɪnskəjə ɡrədənət͡ɕɪlʲstvə]; Azerbaijani: باکو شهر رئیسلگی, romanized: Bākū Şahr Ra'īsligī) was a municipal district (gradonachalstvo) based around the city of Baku in the Caucasus Viceroyalty of the Russian Empire. The Baku gradonachalstvo was formed in 1906 on the territory of the Baku uezd of the Baku Governorate following the Armenian–Tatar Massacres, until its disestablishment after the revolution of 1917. The area of the Baku gradonachalstvo corresponded to the Absheron Peninsula, located in easternmost present-day Azerbaijan.

== Administrative divisions ==
The police precincts (полицеймейстерство politseymeysterstvos) of the Baku gradonachalstvo in 1917 were as follows:

Name	Administrative centre	Population	Area
Bakinskoye politseymeystersvo (Бакинское полицеймейстерство, 'Baku police precinct')	Baku	262,422	128.64 square versts (146.40 km^{2}; 56.53 mi^{2})
Balakhano-Subunchinskoye politseymeystersvo (Балахано-Сабунчинское полицеймейстерство, 'Balakhano-Subunchi police precinct')	Sabunchi (Sabunçu)	143,407	802.56 square versts (913.36 km^{2}; 352.65 mi^{2})

The prefectures (участки, uchastki) of the Balakhano-Subunchi Police Precinct in 1917 were as follow:

Name	Administrative centre
First prefecture (1-й участок)	Sabunchi (Sabunçu)
Second prefecture (2-й участок)	Romany (Ramana)
Third prefecture (3-й участок)	Zabrat
Fourth prefecture (4-й участок)	Balakhany (Balaxanı)
Sixth prefecture (5-й участок)	Surakhany (Suraxanı)
Seventh prefecture (6-й участок)	Binagady (Binəqədi)

The rural communities (сельские общества, selskiye obshchestva) of the Balakhano-Subunchu Police Precinct in 1917 were as follows:

- Byul-Byulinskoye (Бюль-Бюлинское)
- Sabunchinskoye (Сабунчинское)
- Romaninskoye (Романинское)
- Bilgyanskoye (Бильгянское)
- Byzovninskoye (Бузовнинское)
- Zabratskoye (Забратское)
- Mashtaginskoye (Маштагинское)
- Nardaranskoye (Нардаранское)
- Balakhanskoye (Балаханское)
- Kyurdakhanskoye (Кюрдаханское)
- Magomedlinskoye (Магомедлинское)
- Pirshaginskoye (Пиршагинское)
- Amiradzhanskoye (Амираджанское)
- Geovsanskoye (Геовсанское)
- Zyrinskoye (Зыринское)
- Zykhskoye (Зыхское)
- Kalinskoye (Калинское)
- Mardakyanskoye (Мардакянское)
- Surakhanskoye (Сураханское)
- Turkyanskoye (Туркянское)
- Shaganskoye (Шаганское)
- Baladzharskoye (Баладжарское)
- Binagadinskoye (Бинагадинское)
- Geokmalinskoye (Геокмалинское)
- Gerodilskoye (Геродильское)
- Gyuzdekskoye (Гюздекское)
- Diginskoye (Дигинское)
- Kobynskoye (Кобынское)
- Novkhaninskoye (Новханинское)
- Fatmanskoye (Фатманское)
- Khadzhi-Gasanskoye (Хаджи-Гасанское)
- Khirdalanskoye (Хирдаланское)

== Demographics ==
According to the 1917 publication of Kavkazskiy kalendar, the Baku gradonachalstvo had a population of 405,829 on 14 January [O.S. 1 January] 1916, including 235,892 men and 169,937 women, 173,489 of whom were the permanent population, and 232,340 were temporary residents:

Nationality	Urban		Rural		TOTAL	
Nationality	Number	%	Number	%	Number	%
Shia Muslims (Note: Primarily Tatars.)	69,366	26.43	83,532	58.25	152,898	37.68
Russians	79,702	30.37	24,897	17.36	104,599	25.77
Armenians	62,357	23.76	14,809	10.33	77,166	19.01
Sunni Muslims (Note: Primarily Turco-Tatars.)	19,510	7.43	10,420	7.27	29,930	7.38
North Caucasians	6,687	2.55	4,699	3.28	11,386	2.81
Georgians	6,947	2.65	2,027	1.41	8,974	2.21
Jews	6,412	2.44	1,238	0.86	7,650	1.89
Other Europeans	6,197	2.36	1,325	0.92	7,522	1.85
Asiatic Christians	4,313	1.64	460	0.32	4,773	1.18
Roma	239	0.09	0	0.00	239	0.06
Kurds	501	0.19	0	0.00	501	0.12
Yazidis	191	0.07	0	0.00	191	0.05
TOTAL	262,422	100.00	143,407	100.00	405,829	100.00

== Governors ==
- Mikhail Kanevsky (r. 24 December 1906 – 1907)
- Mikhail Folbaum (r. 20 February 1908 – 22 November 1908/January 1909)
- Pyotr Shubinsky(r. 1908 – 22 January 1909)
- Pyotr Martynov (r. 22 January 1909 – 19 February 1915) (Note: Factually ruled up to 18 March 1916.)
- Georgy Kovalyov (r. 1916 – 8 March 1917)
- Pyotr Ilyushkin (r. 8 March 1917 – not earlier than December 1917)
- Guda Gudiev (r. 29 April 1919 – May 1920)

== Bibliography ==
- Hovannisian, Richard G. (1971). The Republic of Armenia. Vol. 1: The First Year, 1918–1919. Berkeley: University of California Press. ISBN 978-0520019843.
- Кавказский календарь на 1917 год [Caucasian calendar for 1917] (in Russian) (72nd ed.). Tiflis: Tipografiya kantselyarii Ye.I.V. na Kavkaze, kazenny dom. 1917. Archived from the original on 4 November 2021.
- Tsutsiev, Arthur (2014). Atlas of the Ethno-Political History of the Caucasus (PDF). Translated by Nora Seligman Favorov. New Haven: Yale University Press. ISBN 9780300153088. Archived (PDF) from the original on 17 June 2023.
