= Shemakha Governorate =

1846–1859 unit of Russia

Coordinates: 40°37′49″N 48°38′29″E

Shemakha Governorate Шемахинская губерния
- Governorate
- Coat of arms

- Map of the Shemakha Governorate (1846–1859)
- Country: Russian Empire
- Viceroyalty: Caucasus
- Established: 1846
- Abolished: 1859
- Capital: Shemakha (present-day Shamakhi)

Area
  - Total: 57,444 km^{2} (22,179 sq mi)
- Highest elevation (Mount Bazardüzü): 4,466 m (14,652 ft)

Population (1851)
  - Total: 603,006
  - Density: 10.497/km^{2} (27.188/sq mi)
- Preceded by: Caspian Oblast
- Succeeded by: Baku Governorate

Shemakha Governorate (Note: Russian: Шемахинская губерния, pre-reform orthography: Шемахинская губернія, romanized: Shemakhinskaya guberniya [ʂɨməxʲɪnskəjə ɡʊbʲɪrnʲɪjə]; Azerbaijani: شماخی غوبیرنیاسی, romanized: Şamāxı ğūberniyāsı) was an administrative-territorial unit (guberniya) of the Caucasus Viceroyalty of the Russian Empire, with its administrative center in Shemakha (Shamakhi). Following the earthquake of 1859, the capital was transferred and the province became known as the Baku Governorate.

== History ==
The governorate was formed by the imperial decree of Tsar Nicholas I on 26 December [O.S. 14 December] 1846, whereby the Caucasus Viceroyalty was divided into four governorates: Shemakha, Tiflis, Kutaisi and Derbent.

Following the catastrophic 1859 Shamakhi earthquake, the capital of the governorate was transferred from Shemakha to the fast-growing city of Baku, for-which the governorate's name was changed accordingly.

== Administrative divisions ==
Shemakha Governorate consisted of five counties (uezds). According to the IX Census of Russia in 1851, the population of the governorate consisted of 319,923 men and 283,083 women, in total 603,006 people. Data on the total population were provided by the Transcaucasian Office of the Imperial Ministry of Finance. It was not possible to determine the exact number of women in each uezd:

District	Russian name	Male population
Baku	Бакинскій уѣздъ	22,380
Shemakha	Шемахинскій уѣздъ	82,989
Lenkoran	Ленкоранскій уѣздъ	43,198
Nukha	Нухинскій уѣздъ	65,952
Shusha	Шушинскій уѣздъ	105,404

== Governor-generals ==
- Baron Alexander Yevstasyevich von Wrangel (1846–1850)
- Sergei Gavrilovich Chilyaev (1850–1857)
- Konstantin Davidovich Tarkhan-Mouravov (1857–1859)
