= Binagadi asphalt lake =

Cluster of tar pits in urban Baku, Azerbaijan

- Binagadi tar pits
- Binəqədi gölü (Azerbaijani)
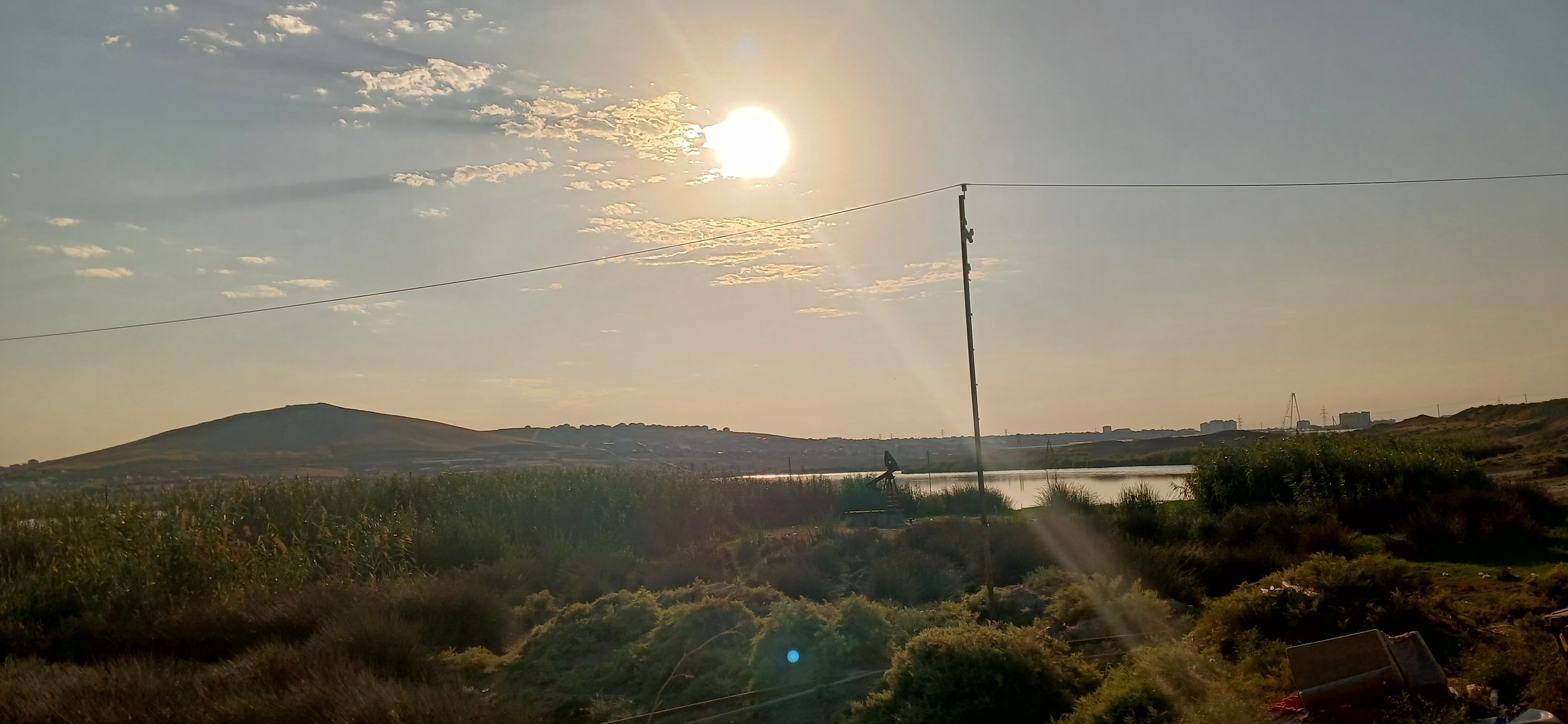
- Keyraki mud volcano and Binagadi lake

- Location within Azerbaijan
- Interactive map of Binagadi asphalt lake
- Location: Binəqədi
- Coordinates: 40°28′04″N 49°48′04″E
- Type: Asphalt lake
- Basin countries: Azerbaijan
- Designation: Monument of Nature of Special Significance, 1982
- Surface area: 1.5 hectares (3.7 acres)
- Surface elevation: 54–57 metres (177–187 ft)

UNESCO World Heritage Site
- Official name: "Binegadi" 4th Period Fauna and Flora Deposit
- Criteria: Natural: (viii) (ix)
- Reference: 1175
- Inscription: 1998 (22nd Session)

The Binagadi asphalt lake (or Binagadi tar pits; Azerbaijani: Binəqədi gölü) are a cluster of tar pits near Binəqədi, Azerbaijan. Asphaltum or tar has seeped up from the ground in this area for tens of thousands of years. The tar is often covered with dust, leaves, or water. Over many centuries, animals that were trapped in the tar were preserved as bones.

This ancient flora and fauna deposit is protected by the State as a monument of a nature of the special significance pursuant to the Decree of the Government of Azerbaijan Republic No. 167 of March 16, 1982.

== Geography of the area ==
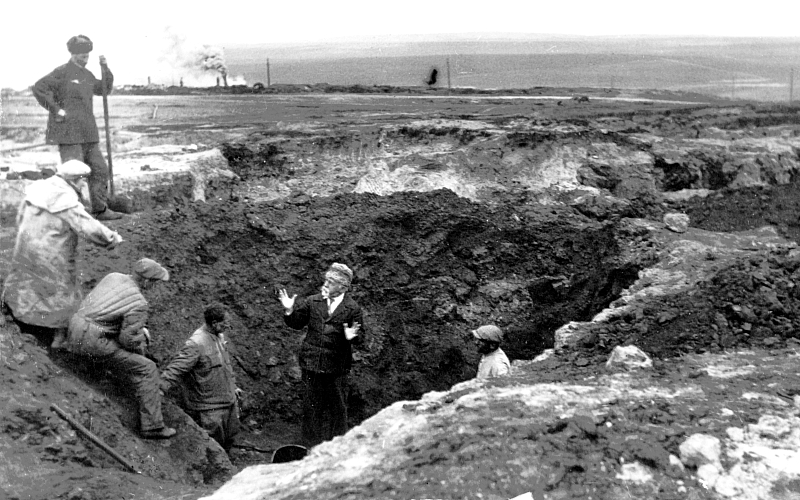
Prof. Vladimir Bogachev (in the pit) leads the paleontological excavations of the Asphalt Lake near Binagadi, 1938

The Binagady locality (Binəqədi) is on the crest of a hill 0.5 km (0.31 mi) southeast of the settlement of Binagady, and 7 km (4.3 mi) north of Baku. The coast at its closest is 10 km (6.2 mi) to the south and 25 km (16 mi) to the north.

The bone-bearing area comprises approximately 1.5 hectares (3.7 acres) and is located on a hilltop near the Kyrrar hill. The area is 54–57 metres (177–187 ft) above present sea level, and 48 metres (157 ft) above the level of Lake Boyukshor. An ancient mud volcano (Kichik-Dag) lies north of the fossiliferous area; further to the north is the meridionally elongated, saline Lake Masazyr (Mirdalyabi) and to the northeast Lake Binagady. To the east is the saline depression Kariatakh-Shor, beyond which rises the Balakhany Plateau. Extending from the Binagady hill are oil-bearing Salinas and the saline Lake Beyuk-Shor, which stretches far to the southeast.

== Discovery and first excavations ==
In the 1930s, paleontological excavations and scientific research at this site were conducted by Professor Vladimir Vladimirovich Bogachev.

The excavations continued until 1941 with the participation of Kasabova and Sultanov and were resumed in 1946 under the supervision of Burchak-Abramovich.

== Natural-Historical Museum ==
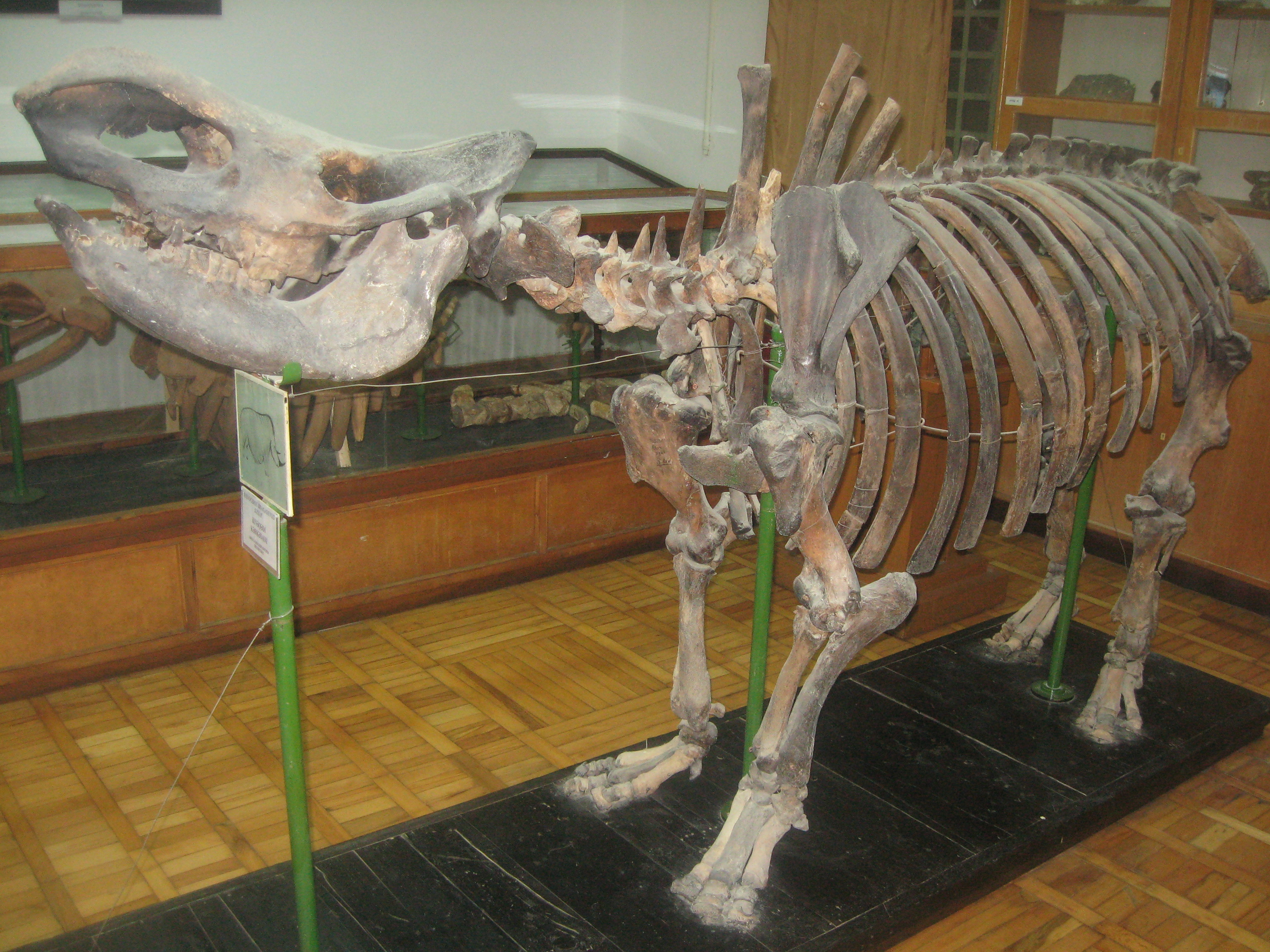
Skeleton of Rhinoceros binagadiensis (Pleistocene), which was found in Binagadi asphalt lake. Natural-Historical Museum after Hasan bey Zardabi. Baku

The Binagadi fauna and flora deposit has been suggested to be richer by number of Quaternary animal fossil than the Californian La Brea Tar Pits. The Binagadi deposit is important in studying the paleobiology of entire Caucasus, Middle East, and the European part of CIS countries.

== Publications ==
Books:

- Bogachev V. V. Binagady: Cemetery of Quaternary Fauna on the Absheron Peninsula. Baku: Publishing House of the AzFAN USSR, 1939. 84 p.
- Bogachev V. V. Pictures of the Primitive Nature of Absheron (Binagady). Baku: Publishing House of the AzFAN USSR, 1940. 114 p.
- Jafarov R. D. Binagady Rhinoceros. - Transactions of the Natural History Museum named after G. Zardabi. - Baku: Publishing House of the Academy of Sciences of the Azerbaijan SSR, 1960. - 99 p.

Articles:

- Bogachev V. V. Remains of a Rhinoceros in the Layers of the Baku Stage // Azerbaijan Oil Industry. 1925. No. 12. Pp. 88-89.
- Bogachev V. V. New data on the flora and fauna of the Binagadi Kirov deposit // Bulletin of the Azerbaijan branch of the USSR Academy of Sciences. 1939. No. 6. Pp. 91-99.
- Bogachev V. V. Study of the Quaternary (Binagadi) fauna of the Absheron Peninsula // Bulletin of the Azerbaijan branch of the USSR Academy of Sciences. 1940. No. 5. Pp. 69-71.
- Bogachev V. V. New finds of the Quaternary fauna on Absheron // Priroda. 1944. No. 2. Pp. 68-71.
- Huseynov, Said; Harris, John M. (December 1, 2010). "Azerbaijan's fossil cemetery: ice-age animals fell victim to an Asian version of California's La Brea Tar Pits". Natural History. pp. 16–21.
