= Javad uezd =

Coordinates: 39°35′42″N 48°58′45″E

Javad uezd Джеватский уезд
- Uezd
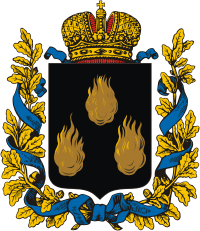
- Coat of arms

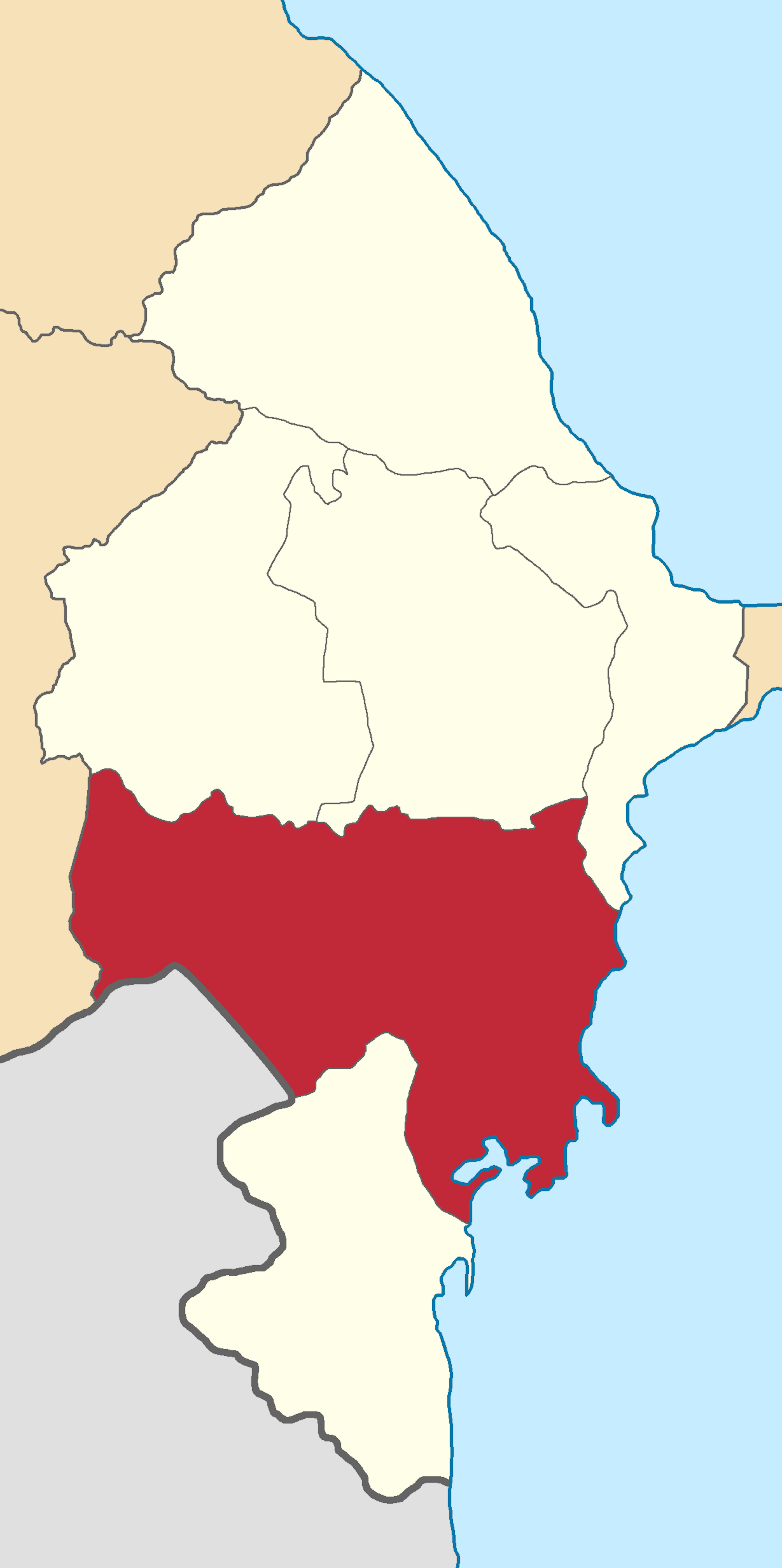
- Location in the Baku Governorate
- Country: Russian Empire
- Viceroyalty: Caucasus
- Governorate: Baku
- Established: 1868
- Abolished: 1929
- Capital: Javad_{(1868–1916)}, Salyan_{(1916–1929)}

Area
  - Total: 9,556.27 km^{2} (3,689.70 sq mi)

Population (1916)
  - Total: 162,305
  - Density: 16.9841/km^{2} (43.9887/sq mi)
  - Rural: 100.00%

The Javad uezd, (Note: Russian: Джеватский уезд, pre-reform orthography: Джеватскій уѣздъ, romanized: Dzhevatskiy uyezd [d͡ʐʐɨvət͡skʲɪj ʊ(j)ɪst]; Azerbaijani: جواد قضاسی, romanized: Cavād qaz̤āsı) known after 1921 as the Salyan uezd, (Note: Russian: Сальянский уезд, romanized: Salyanskiy uyezd [səlʲjɪnskʲɪj ʊ(j)ɪst]) was a county (uezd) within the Baku Governorate of the Russian Empire and then of the Azerbaijan Democratic Republic and Azerbaijan SSR until its formal abolishment in 1929 by the Soviet authorities. The uezd was located in the central part of the governorate, bordering the Geokchay, Shemakha, and Baku uezds to the north, Caspian Sea to the east, Lenkoran uezd to the south and Iran to the west. The administrative center of the uezd was the city of Salyan.

== Administrative divisions ==
The prefectures (участки, uchastki) of the Javad uezd in 1917 were as follows:

| Name | Administrative centre | 1912 population | Area |
|---|---|---|---|
| Bozhepromysdomskiy prefecture (Божепромысдовский участок) | Bozhiy Promysel | 26,801 | 3,336.22 square versts (3,796.83 km^{2}; 1,465.96 mi^{2}) |
| Dzhevatskiy prefecture (Джеватский участок) | Petropavlovka (Sabirabad) | 24,519 | 2,178.06 square versts (2,478.77 km^{2}; 957.06 mi^{2}) |
| Muganskiy prefecture (Муганский участок) | Karadonly (Qaradonlu) | 34,972 | 2,882.69 square versts (3,280.68 km^{2}; 1,266.68 mi^{2}) |
| Belyasvarskiy rayon (Белясварский район) | Belyasuvar (Biləsuvar) | 3,547 | – |

== History ==
Javad uezd was formed in 1868 as part of the Baku Governorate of the Russian Empire. It was abolished in 1929 by Soviet authorities.

== Demographics ==
According to the Brockhaus and Efron Encyclopedic Dictionary, published in the late 19th and early 20th centuries, 94,690 people lived in the uezd, mainly Tatars (later known as Azerbaijanis).

=== Russian Empire Census ===
According to the Russian Empire Census, the Javad uezd had a population of 90,043 on 28 January [O.S. 15 January] 1897, including 51,489 men and 38,554 women. The majority of the population indicated Tatar (Note: Before 1918, Azerbaijanis were generally known as "Tatars". This term, employed by the Russians, referred to Turkic-speaking Muslims of the South Caucasus. After 1918, with the establishment of the Azerbaijan Democratic Republic and "especially during the Soviet era", the Tatar group identified itself as "Azerbaijani".) to be their mother tongue, with a significant Russian speaking minority.

Linguistic composition of the Javad uezd in 1897
| Language | Native speakers | % |
|---|---|---|
| Tatar | 84,054 | 93.35 |
| Russian | 4,009 | 4.45 |
| Armenian | 699 | 0.78 |
| Ukrainian | 619 | 0.69 |
| Avar-Andean | 152 | 0.17 |
| Persian | 147 | 0.16 |
| Georgian | 122 | 0.14 |
| Kyurin | 79 | 0.09 |
| Polish | 60 | 0.07 |
| German | 29 | 0.03 |
| Jewish | 8 | 0.01 |
| Belarusian | 7 | 0.01 |
| Greek | 7 | 0.01 |
| Mordovian | 5 | 0.01 |
| Lithuanian | 4 | 0.00 |
| Other | 42 | 0.05 |
| TOTAL | 90,043 | 100.00 |

=== Kavkazskiy kalendar ===
According to the 1917 publication of Kavkazskiy kalendar, the Javad uezd had a population of 162,305 on 14 January [O.S. 1 January] 1916, including 83,955 men and 78,350 women, 144,376 of whom were the permanent population, and 17,929 were temporary residents:

| Nationality | Number | % |
|---|---|---|
| Shia Muslims (Note: Primarily Tatars.) | 127,440 | 78.52 |
| Russians | 26,128 | 16.10 |
| Sunni Muslims (Note: Primarily Turco-Tatars.) | 7,688 | 4.74 |
| Armenians | 984 | 0.61 |
| Jews | 41 | 0.03 |
| Other Europeans | 24 | 0.01 |
| TOTAL | 162,305 | 100.00 |

=== Soviet census (1926) ===
According to the 1926 census, the population of the uezd was 129,367.

== See also ==
- Javad Khanate

== Bibliography ==
- Bournoutian, George A. (2018). Armenia and Imperial Decline: The Yerevan Province, 1900–1914. Milton Park, Abingdon, Oxon: Routledge. ISBN 978-1-351-06260-2. OCLC 1037283914.
- Hovannisian, Richard G. (1971). The Republic of Armenia. Vol. 1: The First Year, 1918–1919. Berkeley: University of California Press. ISBN 978-0520019843.
- Кавказский календарь на 1913 год [Caucasian calendar for 1913] (in Russian) (68th ed.). Tiflis: Tipografiya kantselyarii Ye.I.V. na Kavkaze, kazenny dom. 1913. Archived from the original on 19 April 2022.
- Кавказский календарь на 1917 год [Caucasian calendar for 1917] (in Russian) (72nd ed.). Tiflis: Tipografiya kantselyarii Ye.I.V. na Kavkaze, kazenny dom. 1917. Archived from the original on 4 November 2021.
- Tsutsiev, Arthur (2014). Atlas of the Ethno-Political History of the Caucasus (PDF). Translated by Nora Seligman Favorov. New Haven: Yale University Press. ISBN 9780300153088. Archived (PDF) from the original on 17 June 2023.
