= Beyt-us-safa =

Beyt-us-safa was a literary council which was first held in the 19th century in Azerbaijan.

== History ==
The literary council was held in the middle of the 19th century, its center was Shamakhy and it was called "Beytus-safa" ("Comfort, fun house"). It was established and established at home of poet Mahammad Safa. The word “Safa” in the name of the council comes from here. Seyid Azim Shirvani was the head of the council. He was the great Azerbaijani poet. Among the members there were Mollah Agha Bikhud, Aghababa Zuhuri, Alakbar Gafil and others. "Beytus-Safa" was in contact with "Majlisi –uns" and "Maslisi-faramushan" in Shusha and "Majmaus-shuara" in Baku[. In council several topics such as literature, art, philosophy were discussed. They read classic works and their own works.

== See also ==
- Majmaus-shuara
