= Geokchay uezd =

Coordinates: 40°39′11″N 47°44′26″E

Geokchay uezd Геокчайский уезд
- Uezd
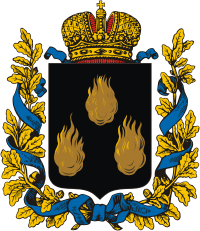
- Coat of arms

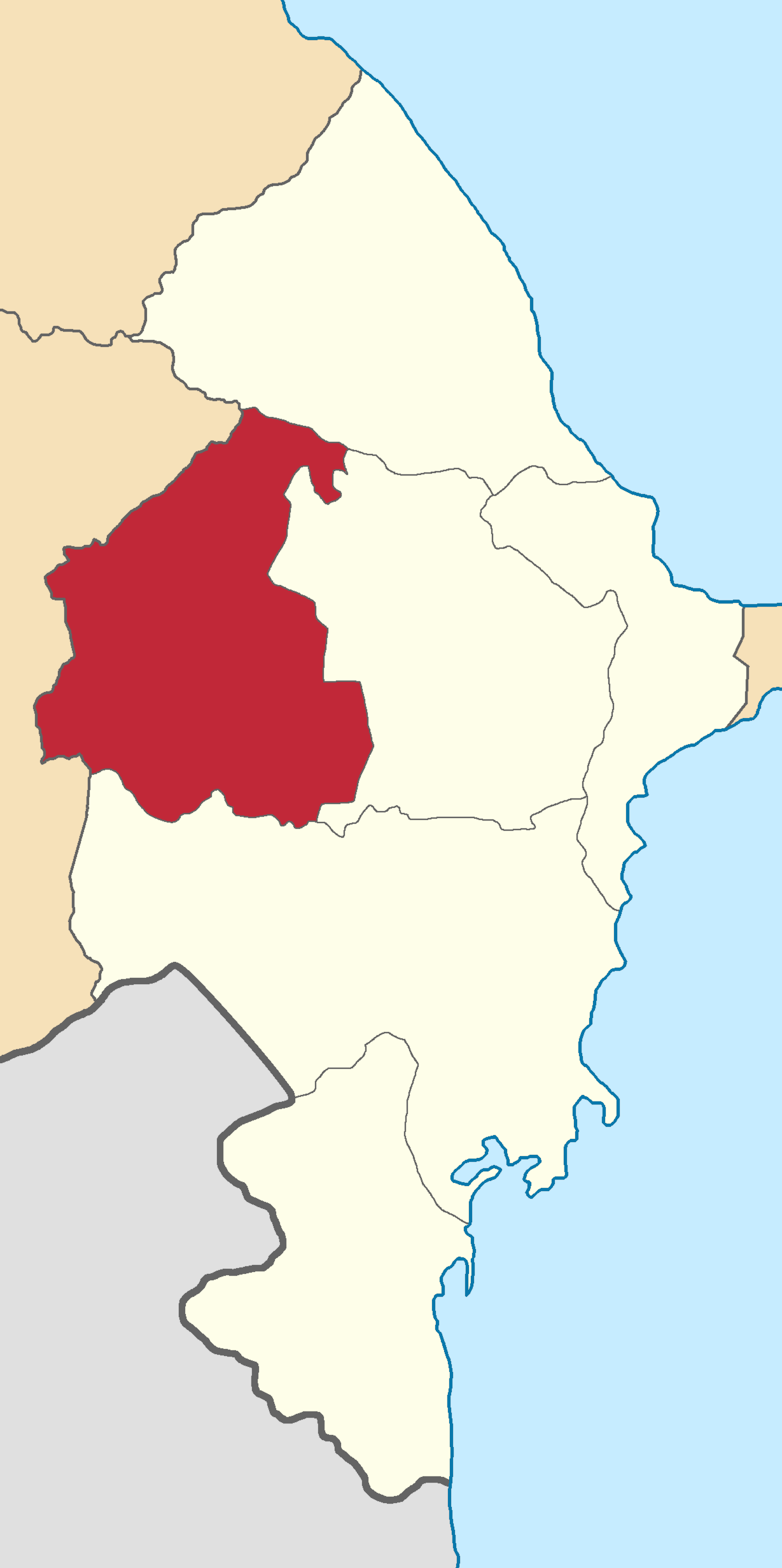
- Location in the Baku Governorate
- Country: Russian Empire
- Viceroyalty: Caucasus
- Governorate: Baku
- Established: 1868
- Abolished: 1929
- Capital: Geokchay (present-day Goychay)

Area
  - Total: 5,322.24 km^{2} (2,054.93 sq mi)

Population (1916)
  - Total: 134,098
  - Density: 25.1958/km^{2} (65.2568/sq mi)
  - Rural: 100.00%

The Geokchay uezd (Note: Russian: Геокчайский уезд, pre-reform orthography: Геокчайскій уѣздъ, romanized: Geokchayskiy uyezd [ɡʲɪəkt͡ɕɪjskʲɪj ʊ(j)ɪst]; Azerbaijani: گوگچای‌ قضاسی, romanized: Gögçāy qaz̤āsı) was a county (uezd) of the Baku Governorate of the Russian Empire and then of the Azerbaijan Democratic Republic and Azerbaijan SSR until its formal abolishment in 1929. The uezd was located in the central part of the governorate, bordering the Kuba uezd to the north, the Shemakha uezd to the east, the Javad uezd to the south and the Elizavetpol Governorate to the west. The administrative center of the uezd was the city of Geokchay (present-day Goychay).

== History ==
The Geokchay uezd was formed in 1868 as part of the Baku Governorate of the Russian Empire. It was later abolished in 1929 by Soviet authorities during an administrative reorganisation of the region into rayons.

== Administrative divisions ==
The prefectures (участки, uchastki) of the Geokchay uezd in 1917 were as follows:

Name	Administrative centre	1912 population	Area
Bargushetskiy prefecture (Баргушетский участок)	Udzhary (Ucar)	48,238	1,952.94 square versts (2,222.57 km^{2}; 858.14 mi^{2})
Ivanovskiy prefecture (Ивановский участок)	Ivanovka (İvanovka)	35,419	1,242.48 square versts (1,414.02 km^{2}; 545.96 mi^{2})
Kyurdamirskiy prefecture (Кюрдамирский участок)	Kyurdamir (Kurdamir)	40,409	1,481.16 square versts (1,685.65 km^{2}; 650.83 mi^{2})

== Demographics ==
=== Russian Empire Census ===
According to the Russian Empire Census, the Geokchay uezd had a population of 117,705 on 28 January [O.S. 15 January] 1897, including 64,133 men and 53,572 women. The majority of the population indicated Tatar (Note: Before 1918, Azerbaijanis were generally known as "Tatars". This term, employed by the Russians, referred to Turkic-speaking Muslims of the South Caucasus. After 1918, with the establishment of the Azerbaijan Democratic Republic and "especially during the Soviet era", the Tatar group identified itself as "Azerbaijani".) to be their mother tongue, with significant Armenian and Tat speaking minorities.

Linguistic composition of the Geokchay uezd in 1897
Language	Native speakers	%
Tatar	92,962	78.98
Armenian	12,994	11.04
Tat	3,995	3.39
Russian	2,458	2.09
Kyurin	2,045	1.74
Avar-Andean	1,772	1.51
Jewish	847	0.72
Persian	265	0.23
Georgian	235	0.20
Polish	27	0.02
Ukrainian	17	0.01
German	14	0.01
Greek	12	0.01
Turkish	11	0.01
Kazi-Kumukh	6	0.01
Mordovian	1	0.00
Other	44	0.04
TOTAL	117,705	100.00

=== Kavkazskiy kalendar ===
According to the 1917 publication of Kavkazskiy kalendar, the Geokchay uezd had 134,098 residents on 14 January [O.S. 1 January] 1916, including 73,891 men and 60,207 women, 127,650 of whom were the permanent population, and 6,448 were temporary residents:

Nationality	Number	%
Sunni Muslims (Note: Primarily Turco-Tatars.)	63,943	47.68
Shia Muslims (Note: Primarily Tatars.)	48,681	36.30
Armenians	17,207	12.83
Russians	3,296	2.46
Jews	815	0.61
North Caucasians	153	0.11
Other Europeans	3	0.00
TOTAL	134,098	100.00

=== Soviet census (1926) ===
According to the 1926 census, the population of the uezd was 172,851.

== Bibliography ==
- Bournoutian, George A. (2018). Armenia and Imperial Decline: The Yerevan Province, 1900–1914. Milton Park, Abingdon, Oxon: Routledge. ISBN 978-1-351-06260-2. OCLC 1037283914.
- Hovannisian, Richard G. (1971). The Republic of Armenia. Vol. 1: The First Year, 1918–1919. Berkeley: University of California Press. ISBN 978-0520019843.
- Кавказский календарь на 1913 год [Caucasian calendar for 1913] (in Russian) (68th ed.). Tiflis: Tipografiya kantselyarii Ye.I.V. na Kavkaze, kazenny dom. 1913. Archived from the original on 19 April 2022.
- Кавказский календарь на 1917 год [Caucasian calendar for 1917] (in Russian) (72nd ed.). Tiflis: Tipografiya kantselyarii Ye.I.V. na Kavkaze, kazenny dom. 1917. Archived from the original on 4 November 2021.
- Tsutsiev, Arthur (2014). Atlas of the Ethno-Political History of the Caucasus (PDF). Translated by Nora Seligman Favorov. New Haven: Yale University Press. ISBN 9780300153088. Archived (PDF) from the original on 17 June 2023.
