= Justus Hübsch von Grossthal =

Imperial Russian noble and military person

Baron Justus Hübsch von Grossthal

Governor of Baku
- In office 24 March 1882 – 8 January 1888
- Vice Governor: Iosif Benislavsky
- Preceded by: Valeriy Pozen
- Succeeded by: Vladimir Rogge

Personal details
- Born: August 28, 1822 Constantinople, Ottoman Empire
- Died: February 3, 1898 (aged 75) Odessa, Kherson Governorate

Justus Hübsch von Grossthal (Russian: Юстин Казимирович Гюбш фон Гросталь, German: Justus Hübsch v. Großthal) was an Imperial Russian military person of Danish-German descent. He served as governor of Baku Governorate between 1882 and 1888.

== Life ==
He was born on 28 August 1822 to Casimir-Alphonse Hübsch von Grossthal, Danish chargé d’affaires to Constantinople and Catherina Navoni (1782-1869) in Ottoman Empire. The Hübsch family hailed from Denmark, starting as merchants in the Pera neighborhood of Constantinople, then gradually getting involved in diplomacy. They gained "Grossthal" (from German: großes Tal - Great Valley) thanks to their villa in Büyükdere (literally "Great Valley" in the Turkish) quarter of Constantinople.

He started as officer of the Imperial Russian army on 10 August 1844. He reached the rank of colonel in 1848 and participated in the Hungarian campaign later in 1849. Having participated in the Caucasian War in 1860 with success, he transferred to Odessa Military District in 1865. He was promoted to major-general in 1877 and was transferred to Baku in 1879.

He was appointed as governor of Baku Governorate on 24 March 1882 and served there until 8 January 1888. During his governorate he tried to subdue robber bands in Quba uyezd with limited success. He died on 3 February 1898, in Odessa.

== Family ==
He was married to Ecaterina Barbu from Știrbei family on 1 August 1851 in Bucharest. However their children died young and Ecaterina died in 1854. Justus later married to a Frenchwoman Adèle Fonton on 17 February 1857. She died on 24 December 1881.
