= Mikayil Alakbarov =

Azerbaijani Red Army man (1924–1943)

Mikayil Mahammad oglu Alakbarov
- Mikayıl Məhəmməd oğlu Ələkbərov
- Born: 1924; Saray, Transcaucasian Socialist Federative Soviet Republic, Soviet Union
- Died: 13 October 1943 (aged 18–19); Verkhnodniprovsk Raion, Dnipropetrovsk Oblast, Ukrainian SSR, Soviet Union
- Military career
- Allegiance: Soviet Union
- Branch: Red Army
- Service years: 1942–1943
- Rank: Red Army man
- Unit: 81st Guards Rifle Division
- Conflicts: World War II; Battle of the Dnieper
- Awards: Hero of the Soviet Union

Mikayil Mahammad oglu Alakbarov (Azerbaijani: Mikayıl Məhəmməd oğlu Ələkbərov; 1924–13 October 1943) was an Azerbaijani Red Army man and a posthumous Hero of the Soviet Union. Alakbarov was posthumously awarded the title on 26 October 1943 for his actions during the Battle of the Dnieper, during which he reportedly repulsed 14 counterattacks and was seriously wounded.

== Early life ==
Alakbarov was born in 1924 in Saray in the family of an oil worker. His childhood and youth were spent in Baku. After finishing his education, Alakbarov became an oil worker.

== World War II ==
In 1942, Alakbarov was drafted into the Red Army. He fought in combat from April 1943 and became a scout in the 79th Guards Reconnaissance Company of the 81st Guards Rifle Division. He fought in the Battle of the Dnieper in September 1943. On the night of 25 September, he was reportedly among the first in the company to cross the river and explore the German defenses. On the night of 26 September with a group of scouts Alakbarov advanced to the village of Borodaevka in Verkhnodniprovsk Raion. The scouts launched a night attack to reveal the German mortar and artillery positions. The group reportedly did not suffer casualties in this action. On 27 September during the battle for the village, Alakbarov reportedly captured two German soldiers and killed four. He reportedly helped repulse 14 counterattacks along with the reconnaissance unit. During this action he reportedly killed 10 German soldiers. On 30 September Alakbarov was seriously wounded. He died in the 869th Field Hospital on 13 October. On 26 October he posthumously received the title of Hero of the Soviet Union and the Order of Lenin.

Alakbarov was buried in the village of Scherbinovka and was later reburied in Rudka in Tsarychanka Raion.

== Legacy ==
A bust of Alakbarov was placed in Saray. Schools in Saray and Rudka were named for him.
