= Baku uezd =

Baku uezd Бакинский уезд
- Uezd
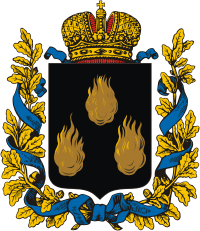
- Coat of arms

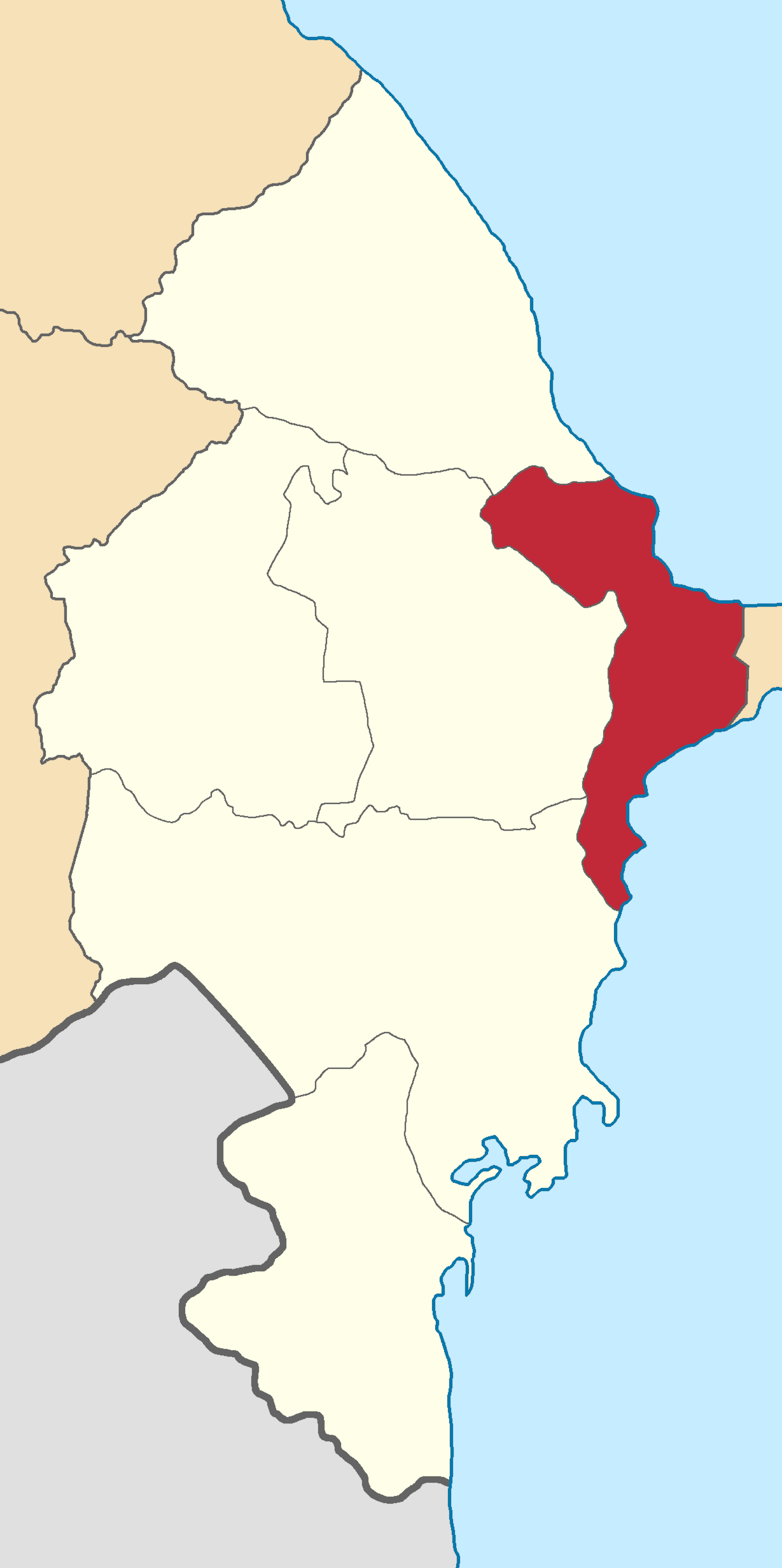
- Location in the Baku Governorate
- Country: Russian Empire
- Viceroyalty: Caucasus
- Governorate: Baku
- Established: 1840
- Abolished: 1929
- Capital: Baku (1840–1906); Sarai (present-day Saray; 1906–1917)

Area
  - Total: 2,970.59 km^{2} (1,146.95 sq mi)

Population (1916)
  - Total: 16,268
  - Density: 5.4764/km^{2} (14.184/sq mi)
  - Rural: 100.00%

The Baku uezd (Note: Russian: Бакинский уезд, pre-reform orthography: Бакинскій уѣздъ, romanized: Bakinskiy uyezd [bəkʲɪnskʲɪj ʊ(j)ɪst]; Azerbaijani: باکو قضاسی, romanized: Bākū qaz̤āsı) was a county (uezd) within the Baku Governorate of the Russian Empire and then of Azerbaijan Democratic Republic and Azerbaijan SSR until its formal abolishment in 1929. The uezd was located in the eastern part of the Baku Governorate, bordering Caspian Sea to the east, Shemakha uezd to the west, Kuba uezd to the north and Lenkoran uezd to the south. The administrative center of the uezd was the village Sarai (present-day Saray).

== History ==
After the capture of the Baku Khanate by the Russian Empire in 1806, during the Caucasus Campaign, the khanate was removed and was made a province of the Russian Empire. The uezd was created in 1840 and was initially made part of the Caspian Oblast and later part of the Shemakha Governorate in 1846. As a result of the devastating earthquake in Shamakhi in 1859, the administrative center of the Shamakhi Governorate was transferred to Baku, resulting in the subsequent renaming of the governorate to the Baku Governorate.

After the collapse of the Russian Empire in 1917, the area of modern-day Azerbaijan became part of Transcaucasian Democratic Federative Republic, during which the city of Baku and its peripheries were under the control of the Baku Commune which perpetrated the March Days Massacre against the Azerbaijani population of Baku. Shortly after the dissolution of Transcaucasia and the establishment of 3 independent republics including the Azerbaijan Democratic Republic, Baku again became the site of massacre in the revengeful September Days Massacre against the Armenian population, following the Battle of Baku and the city's capture by Ottoman-Azerbaijani forces. Baku subsequently became the new capital of the nascent Azerbaijani republic, the government relocating there from its original western capital in Ganja, which was also the capital of the neighboring Elisabethpol Governorate.

In 1920, after the decisive establishment of Soviet power in Azerbaijan, the Baku uezd was retained as an administrative unit within the Azerbaijan SSR until its formal abolishment in 1929 during a territorial-administrative reorganisation of the nation.

== Administrative divisions ==
The prefectures (участки, uchastki) of the Baku uezd in 1917 were as follows:

| Name | Administrative centre | 1912 population | Area |
|---|---|---|---|
| Sarainskiy prefecture (Сараинский участок) | Sarai (Saray) | 26,059 | 2,610.22 square versts (2,970.59 km^{2}; 1,146.95 mi^{2}) |

== Demographics ==
=== Russian Empire Census ===
According to the Russian Empire Census, the Baku uezd had a population of 182,897 on 28 January [O.S. 15 January] 1897, including 108,448 men and 74,449 women. The majority of the population indicated Tatar (Note: Before 1918, Azerbaijanis were generally known as "Tatars". This term, employed by the Russians, referred to Turkic-speaking Muslims of the South Caucasus. After 1918, with the establishment of the Azerbaijan Democratic Republic and "especially during the Soviet era", the Tatar group identified itself as "Azerbaijani".) to be their mother tongue, with significant Russian, Tat, and Armenian speaking minorities.

Linguistic composition of the Baku uezd in 1897
| Language | Native speakers | % |
|---|---|---|
| Tatar | 63,415 | 34.67 |
| Russian | 43,893 | 24.00 |
| Tat | 34,503 | 18.86 |
| Armenian | 22,583 | 12.35 |
| Persian | 4,774 | 2.61 |
| German | 3,204 | 1.75 |
| Jewish | 2,034 | 1.11 |
| Kyurin | 1,235 | 0.68 |
| Georgian | 1,127 | 0.62 |
| Ukrainian | 981 | 0.54 |
| Avar-Andean | 737 | 0.40 |
| Polish | 982 | 0.54 |
| Turkish | 837 | 0.46 |
| Belarusian | 636 | 0.35 |
| Mordovian | 353 | 0.19 |
| Swedish | 345 | 0.19 |
| Greek | 249 | 0.14 |
| Kazi-Kumukh | 128 | 0.07 |
| Lithuanian | 115 | 0.06 |
| Talysh | 3 | 0.00 |
| Other | 763 | 0.42 |
| TOTAL | 182,897 | 100.00 |

=== Kavkazskiy kalendar ===
According to the 1917 publication of Kavkazskiy kalendar, the Baku uezd had a population of 16,268 on 14 January [O.S. 1 January] 1916, including 8,759 men and 7,509 women, 15,746 of whom were the permanent population, and 522 were temporary residents:

| Nationality | Number | % |
|---|---|---|
| Shia Muslims (Note: Primarily Tatars.) | 15,746 | 96.79 |
| Russians | 355 | 2.18 |
| Sunni Muslims (Note: Primarily Turco-Tatars.) | 93 | 0.57 |
| Armenians | 32 | 0.20 |
| Georgians | 30 | 0.18 |
| Jews | 12 | 0.07 |
| TOTAL | 16,268 | 100.00 |

=== Soviet census (1926) ===
The population of the uezd rose significantly to 527,220 people by 1926 as a result of the significant expansion of the Baku Oil Fields.

== Bibliography ==
- Bournoutian, George A. (2018). Armenia and Imperial Decline: The Yerevan Province, 1900–1914. Milton Park, Abingdon, Oxon: Routledge. ISBN 978-1-351-06260-2. OCLC 1037283914.
- Hovannisian, Richard G. (1971). The Republic of Armenia. Vol. 1: The First Year, 1918–1919. Berkeley: University of California Press. ISBN 978-0520019843.
- Кавказский календарь на 1913 год [Caucasian calendar for 1913] (in Russian) (68th ed.). Tiflis: Tipografiya kantselyarii Ye.I.V. na Kavkaze, kazenny dom. 1913. Archived from the original on 19 April 2022.
- Кавказский календарь на 1917 год [Caucasian calendar for 1917] (in Russian) (72nd ed.). Tiflis: Tipografiya kantselyarii Ye.I.V. na Kavkaze, kazenny dom. 1917. Archived from the original on 4 November 2021.
- Tsutsiev, Arthur (2014). Atlas of the Ethno-Political History of the Caucasus (PDF). Translated by Nora Seligman Favorov. New Haven: Yale University Press. ISBN 9780300153088. Archived (PDF) from the original on 17 June 2023.
