= Kuba uezd =

Coordinates: 41°21′35″N 48°30′45″E

Kuba uezd Кубинский уезд
- Uezd
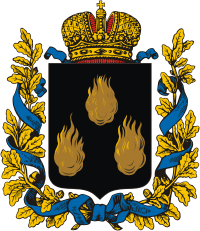
- Coat of arms

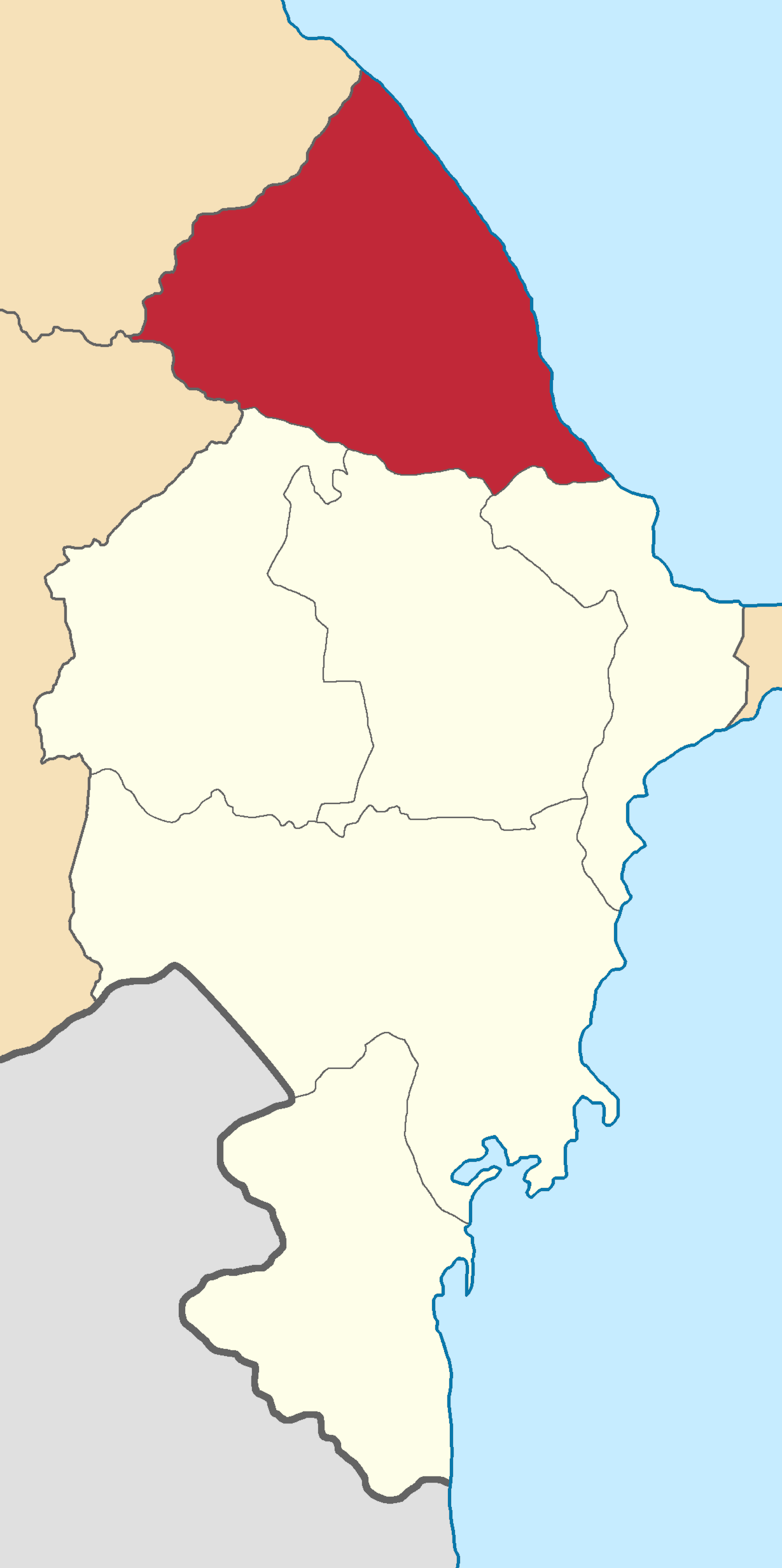
- Location in the Baku Governorate
- Country: Russian Empire
- Viceroyalty: Caucasus
- Governorate: Baku
- Established: 1840
- Abolished: 1929
- Capital: Kuba (present-day Quba)

Area
  - Total: 7,179.59 km^{2} (2,772.06 sq mi)

Population (1916)
  - Total: 198,204
  - Density: 27.6066/km^{2} (71.5007/sq mi)
  - Urban: 13.60%
  - Rural: 86.40%

The Kuba uezd (Note: Russian: Кубинский уезд, pre-reform orthography: Кубинскій уѣздъ, romanized: Kubinskiy uyezd [kʊbʲɪnskʲɪj ʊ(j)ɪst]; Azerbaijani: قبہ قضاسی, romanized: Qubeh qaz̤āsı) was a county (uezd) within the Baku Governorate of Russian Empire and then of Azerbaijan Democratic Republic and Azerbaijan SSR until its formal abolition in 1929 by Soviet authorities. The uezd was located in northern part of the Baku Governorate, bordering Caspian Sea to the east, Elizavetpol Governorate to the west, Dagestan Oblast to the north, the Geokchay, Shemakha, and Baku uezds to the south. The administrative center of the uezd was the city of Kuba (present-day Quba).

== Administrative divisions ==
The prefectures (участки, uchastki) of the Kuba uezd in 1917 were as follows:

Name	Administrative centre	1912 population	Area
Divichinskiy prefecture (Дивичинский участок)	Divichi (Şabran)	41,569	1,764.78 square versts (2,008.43 km^{2}; 775.46 mi^{2})
Kubinskiy prefecture (Кубинский участок)	Rustov	54,113	1,855.78 square versts (2,111.99 km^{2}; 815.45 mi^{2})
Kusarskiy prefecture (Кусарский участок)	Kusary (Qusar)	53,645	1,437.34 square versts (1,635.78 km^{2}; 631.58 mi^{2})
Myushkyurskiy prefecture (Мюшкюрский участок)	Khachmaz	16,540	1,250.71 square versts (1,423.39 km^{2}; 549.57 mi^{2})

== Geography ==
The uezd was located on the northern slope of the eastern part of Greater Caucasus mountain range, mainly consisting of 3 main parts: Mountains, which occupies most parts of the south-west, foothills, covering most of the uezd from south-west to northeast, and lowlands, mostly in the areas bordering the Caspian Sea. The highest point in the uezd, Shahdagh, is located at the western part of the uezd at 13,951 feet.

The three main rivers in the uezd were Qudyal, Gilgil and Qusarchay. The Samur river formed the northern border.

== History ==
After the capture of the Quba Khanate by the Russian forces in 1806, during the Russo-Persian War (1804–1813), the khanate was removed and was made a province of the Russian Empire. The uezd was created in 1840 and was initially made part of the Caspian Oblast in the same year, and later part of the Shamakhi Governorate in 1846. Due to an earthquake in Shamakhi in 1859, the centre of the Shamakhi Governorate was moved from Shamakhi to Baku and the governorate was renamed Baku Governorate.

In 1918, after the collapse of the Russian Empire, Azerbaijan became part of Transcaucasian Democratic Federative Republic. After the establishment of the Baku Commune in April 1918, clashes began in the city of Baku and other uezds within the Baku Governorate, called the March Days, during which 12,000 Azerbaijanis and other Muslims and 2,500 Armenians died.

On 28 May 1918, the Azerbaijan Democratic Republic declared its independence and the uezd was kept as part of its administrative units. After the Red Army invasion of Azerbaijan in 1920, Azerbaijan was integrated into the Soviet Union and the uezd was abolished by Soviet authorities in 1929.

== Demographics ==
=== Russian Empire Census ===
According to the Russian Empire Census, the Kuba uezd had a population of 183,242 on 28 January [O.S. 15 January] 1897, including 96,771 men and 86,471 women. The plurality of the population indicated Tatar (Note: Before 1918, Azerbaijanis were generally known as "Tatars". This term, employed by the Russians, referred to Turkic-speaking Muslims of the South Caucasus. After 1918, with the establishment of the Azerbaijan Democratic Republic and "especially during the Soviet era", the Tatar group identified itself as "Azerbaijani".) to be their mother tongue, with significant Tat, Kyurin, and Kazi-Kumukh speaking minorities.

Linguistic composition of the Kuba uezd in 1897
Language	Native speakers	%
Tatar	70,150	38.28
Tat	46,430	25.34
Kyurin	44,756	24.42
Kazi-Kumukh	11,614	6.34
Jewish	3,972	2.17
Russian	2,516	1.37
Ukrainian	1,426	0.78
Armenian	1,191	0.65
Persian	549	0.30
Turkish	216	0.12
Avar-Andean	97	0.05
Georgian	66	0.04
Polish	64	0.03
German	38	0.02
Belarusian	29	0.02
Lithuanian	5	0.00
Mordovian	1	0.00
Other	122	0.07
TOTAL	183,242	100.00

=== Kavkazskiy kalendar ===
According to the 1917 publication of Kavkazskiy kalendar, the Kuba uezd had a population of 198,204 on 14 January [O.S. 1 January] 1916, including 105,556 men and 92,648 women, 196,077 of whom were the permanent population, and 2,127 were temporary residents:

Nationality	Urban		Rural		TOTAL	
Nationality	Number	%	Number	%	Number	%
Sunni Muslims (Note: Primarily Turco-Tatars.)	4,218	15.65	102,472	59.84	106,690	53.83
North Caucasians	417	1.55	48,688	28.43	49,105	24.77
Shia Muslims (Note: Primarily Tatars.)	6,830	25.34	13,627	7.96	20,457	10.32
Jews	14,713	54.58	322	0.19	15,035	7.59
Russians	177	0.66	5,206	3.04	5,383	2.72
Armenians	579	2.15	933	0.54	1,512	0.76
Asiatic Christians	22	0.08	0	0.00	22	0.01
TOTAL	26,956	100.00	171,248	100.00	198,204	100.00

=== Soviet census (1926) ===
In 1926, the population of the uezd rose to 189,916 people, of which 17,902 were urban and 172,014 rural.

== Bibliography ==
- Bournoutian, George A. (2018). Armenia and Imperial Decline: The Yerevan Province, 1900–1914. Milton Park, Abingdon, Oxon: Routledge. ISBN 978-1-351-06260-2. OCLC 1037283914.
- Hovannisian, Richard G. (1971). The Republic of Armenia. Vol. 1: The First Year, 1918–1919. Berkeley: University of California Press. ISBN 978-0520019843.
- Кавказский календарь на 1913 год [Caucasian calendar for 1913] (in Russian) (68th ed.). Tiflis: Tipografiya kantselyarii Ye.I.V. na Kavkaze, kazenny dom. 1913. Archived from the original on 19 April 2022.
- Кавказский календарь на 1917 год [Caucasian calendar for 1917] (in Russian) (72nd ed.). Tiflis: Tipografiya kantselyarii Ye.I.V. na Kavkaze, kazenny dom. 1917. Archived from the original on 4 November 2021.
- Tsutsiev, Arthur (2014). Atlas of the Ethno-Political History of the Caucasus (PDF). Translated by Nora Seligman Favorov. New Haven: Yale University Press. ISBN 9780300153088. Archived (PDF) from the original on 17 June 2023.
