= Lenkoran uezd =

Coordinates: 38°45′13″N 48°51′04″E

Lenkoran uezd Ленкоранский уезд
- Uezd
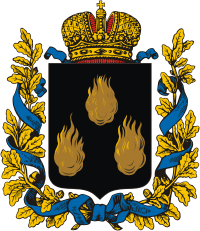
- Coat of arms

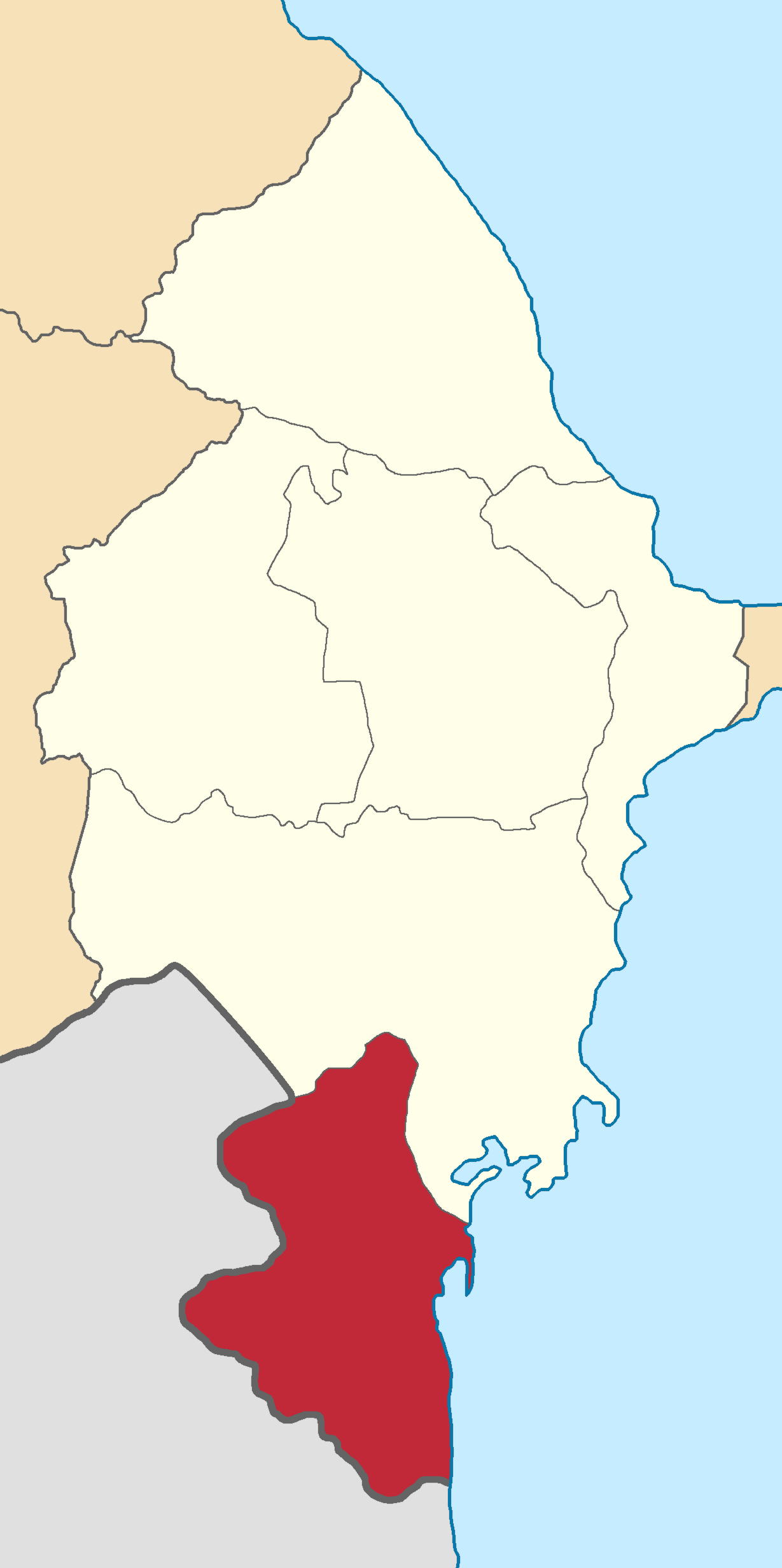
- Location in the Baku Governorate
- Country: Russian Empire
- Viceroyalty: Caucasus
- Governorate: Baku
- Established: 1840
- Abolished: 1929
- Capital: Lenkoran (present-day Lankaran)

Area
  - Total: 5,379.48 km^{2} (2,077.03 sq mi)

Population (1916)
  - Total: 203,319
  - Density: 37.7953/km^{2} (97.8893/sq mi)
  - Urban: 8.76%
  - Rural: 91.24%
- Preceded by: Talysh Khanate
- Succeeded by: Azerbaijan SSR

The Lenkoran uezd (Note: Russian: Ленкоранский уезд, pre-reform orthography: Ленкоранскій уѣздъ, romanized: Lenkoranskiy uyezd [lʲɪnkərənskʲɪj ʊ(j)ɪst]; Azerbaijani: لنکران قضاسی, romanized: Lankarān qaz̤āsı) or Talysh uezd (Note: Russian: Талышинский уезд, pre-reform orthography: Талышинскій уѣздъ, romanized: Talyshinskiy uyezd [təɫɨʂɨnskʲɪj ʊ(j)ɪst]) was a county (uezd) within the Baku Governorate of the Russian Empire, and then of the Azerbaijan Democratic Republic and the Azerbaijan SSR until its formal abolishment in 1929. The county was located on the southern part of the governorate, bordering Caspian Sea to the east, Javad uezd to the north, and Iran to the southwest. The administrative centre of the county was the city of Lenkoran (present-day Lankaran).

== Administrative divisions ==
The prefectures (участки, uchastki) of the Lenkoran uezd in 1917 were as follows:

Name	Administrative centre	1912 population	Area
Arkevanskiy prefecture (Аркеванский участок)	Nikolayevka	33,413	700.16 square versts (796.83 km^{2}; 307.66 mi^{2})
Zuvandskiy prefecture (Зувандский участок)	Lerik	30,058	1,198.15 square versts (1,363.57 km^{2}; 526.48 mi^{2})
Lenkoranskiy prefecture (Ленкоранский участок)	Lenkoran (Lankaran)	30,605	1,180.53 square versts (1,343.52 km^{2}; 518.73 mi^{2})
Sebidazhskiy prefecture (Себидажский участок)	Prishib (Göytəpə)	40,652	1,648.04 square versts (1,875.57 km^{2}; 724.16 mi^{2})
Astarinskiy rayon (Астаринский район)	Astara	6,730	–

== History ==
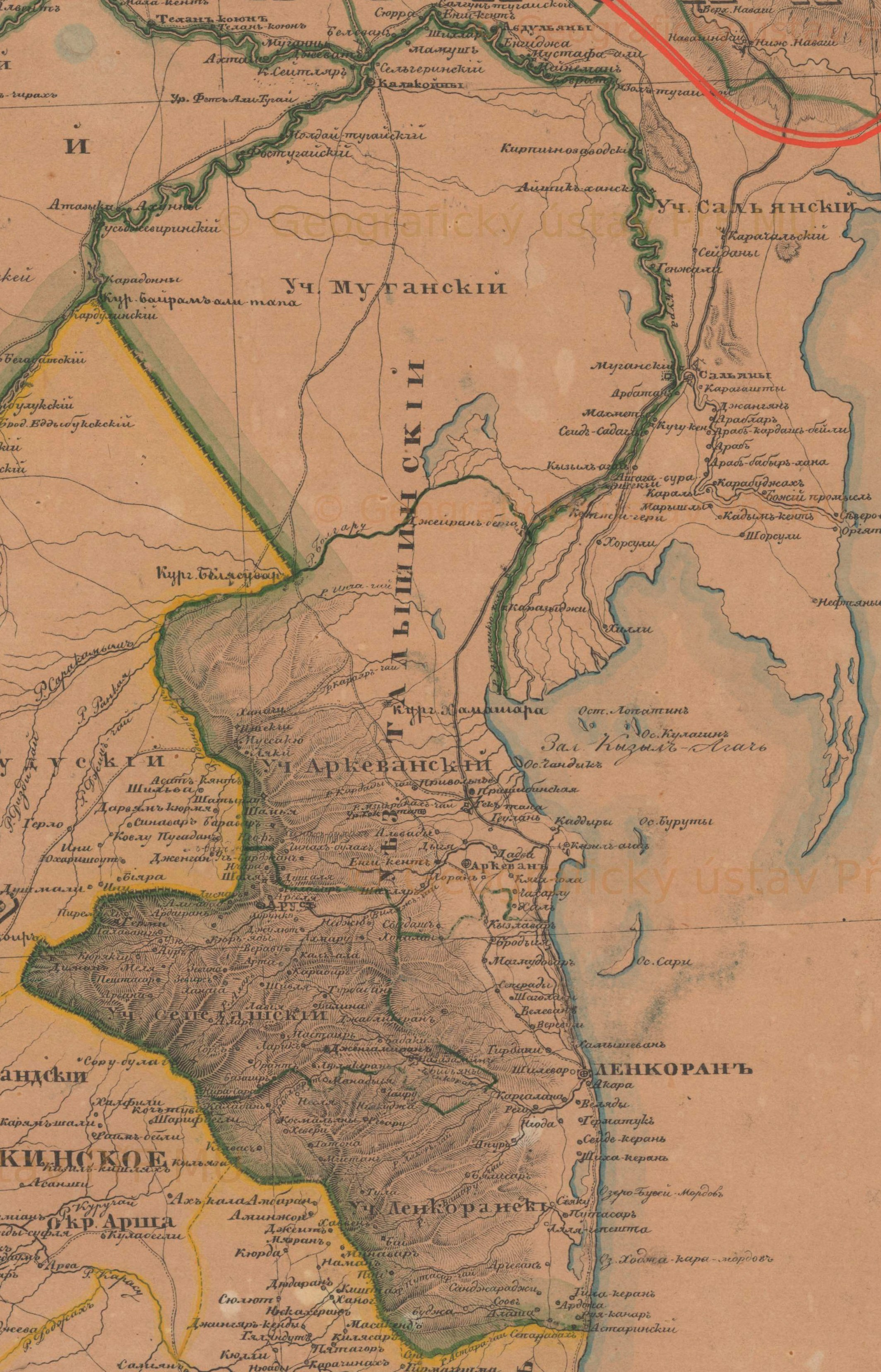
Talysh uezd on the map of the Caucasian region in 1842

The county was established on 10 April 1840 on the basis of Talysh Khanate. It was initially made a part of the Caspian oblast on 1840, and later renamed Lenkoran uezd in 1845 and made part of the Shamakhi Governorate in 1846. Due to an earthquake in Shamakhi in 1859, the centre of the Shamakhi Governorate was moved from Shamakhi to Baku and the governorate was renamed Baku Governorate.

In 1918, after the collapse of the Russian Empire, Azerbaijan Democratic Republic gained brief independence. Bolshevik Baku Commune was controlling Baku at the time, and they were trying to spread their control over other places in Azerbaijan, such as Lenkoran uezd. This led to the creation of the Mughan Soviet Republic in the territories of the Lenkoran uezd on 25 April 1919, but the republic was short-lived and it collapsed 3 months later, on 27 July 1919. Subsequently, the county was integrated into Azerbaijan Democratic Republic.

After the Red Army invasion of Azerbaijan in 1920, Azerbaijan was integrated into the Soviet Union and the county was abolished by Soviet authorities in 1929.

== Demographics ==
According to the "Code of statistical data on the population of the Transcaucasian region" from 1886, the population of the county was 109,340 people, of which 50,887 (46.5%) Talysh, 50,510 (46.2%) were Azerbaijanis, 7,634 were Russians and 273 (0.2%) were Armenians.

=== Russian Empire Census ===
According to the Russian Empire Census, the Lenkoran uezd had a population of 130,987 on 28 January [O.S. 15 January] 1897, including 72,492 men and 58,495 women. The majority of the population indicated Tatar (Note: Before 1918, Azerbaijanis were generally known as "Tatars". This term, employed by the Russians, referred to Turkic-speaking Muslims of the South Caucasus. After 1918, with the establishment of the Azerbaijan Democratic Republic and "especially during the Soviet era", the Tatar group identified itself as "Azerbaijani".) to be their mother tongue, with significant Talysh and Russian speaking minorities.

Linguistic composition of the Lenkoran uezd in 1897
Language	Native speakers	%
Tatar	84,725	64.68
Talysh	34,991	26.71
Russian	9,481	7.24
Armenian	483	0.37
Ukrainian	243	0.19
Jewish	207	0.16
Polish	205	0.16
Mordovian	169	0.13
German	132	0.10
Persian	89	0.07
Turkish	82	0.06
Tat	74	0.06
Georgian	17	0.01
Avar-Andean	14	0.01
Greek	9	0.01
Lithuanian	5	0.00
Belarusian	4	0.00
Kyurin	4	0.00
Swedish	2	0.00
Kazi-Kumukh	1	0.00
Other	50	0.04
TOTAL	130,987	100.00

=== Kavkazskiy kalendar ===
According to the 1917 publication of Kavkazskiy kalendar, the Lenkoran uezd had a population of 203,319 on 14 January [O.S. 1 January] 1916, including 106,891 men and 96,428 women, 195,247 of whom were the permanent population, and 8,072 were temporary residents:

Nationality	Urban		Rural		TOTAL	
Nationality	Number	%	Number	%	Number	%
Shia Muslims (Note: Primarily Tatars.)	15,147	85.09	161,815	87.22	176,962	87.04
Russians	1,874	10.53	16,206	8.74	18,080	8.89
Sunni Muslims (Note: Primarily Turco-Tatars.)	82	0.46	7,086	3.82	7,168	3.53
Armenians	550	3.09	286	0.15	836	0.41
Jews	99	0.56	118	0.06	217	0.11
Other Europeans	49	0.28	7	0.00	56	0.03
TOTAL	17,801	100.00	185,518	100.00	203,319	100.00

=== Soviet census (1926) ===
In 1926, the population of the county rose to 208,479.

== Bibliography ==
- Bournoutian, George A. (2018). Armenia and Imperial Decline: The Yerevan Province, 1900–1914. Milton Park, Abingdon, Oxon: Routledge. ISBN 978-1-351-06260-2. OCLC 1037283914.
- Hovannisian, Richard G. (1971). The Republic of Armenia. Vol. 1: The First Year, 1918–1919. Berkeley: University of California Press. ISBN 978-0520019843.
- Кавказский календарь на 1913 год [Caucasian calendar for 1913] (in Russian) (68th ed.). Tiflis: Tipografiya kantselyarii Ye.I.V. na Kavkaze, kazenny dom. 1913. Archived from the original on 19 April 2022.
- Кавказский календарь на 1917 год [Caucasian calendar for 1917] (in Russian) (72nd ed.). Tiflis: Tipografiya kantselyarii Ye.I.V. na Kavkaze, kazenny dom. 1917. Archived from the original on 4 November 2021.
- Tsutsiev, Arthur (2014). Atlas of the Ethno-Political History of the Caucasus (PDF). Translated by Nora Seligman Favorov. New Haven: Yale University Press. ISBN 9780300153088. Archived (PDF) from the original on 17 June 2023.
