= Gradonachalstvo =

A gradonachalstvo (Russian: градоначальство) was a special administrative territorial entity of the Russian Empire since the 19th century, consisting of a city and its adjacent territory under administration of a gradonachalnik. Gradonachlstvos were subordinated directly to the Ministry of Internal Affairs and the gradonachalnik was subordinated to the General Governor The gradonachalnik had all rights of a city governor with respect to the self-government of the city in question. As of 1893, there were four gradonachalstvos: for Saint Petersburg, Odessa, Kerch-Yenikale, and Sevastopol.
