= Saray, Absheron =

Saray
- Municipality
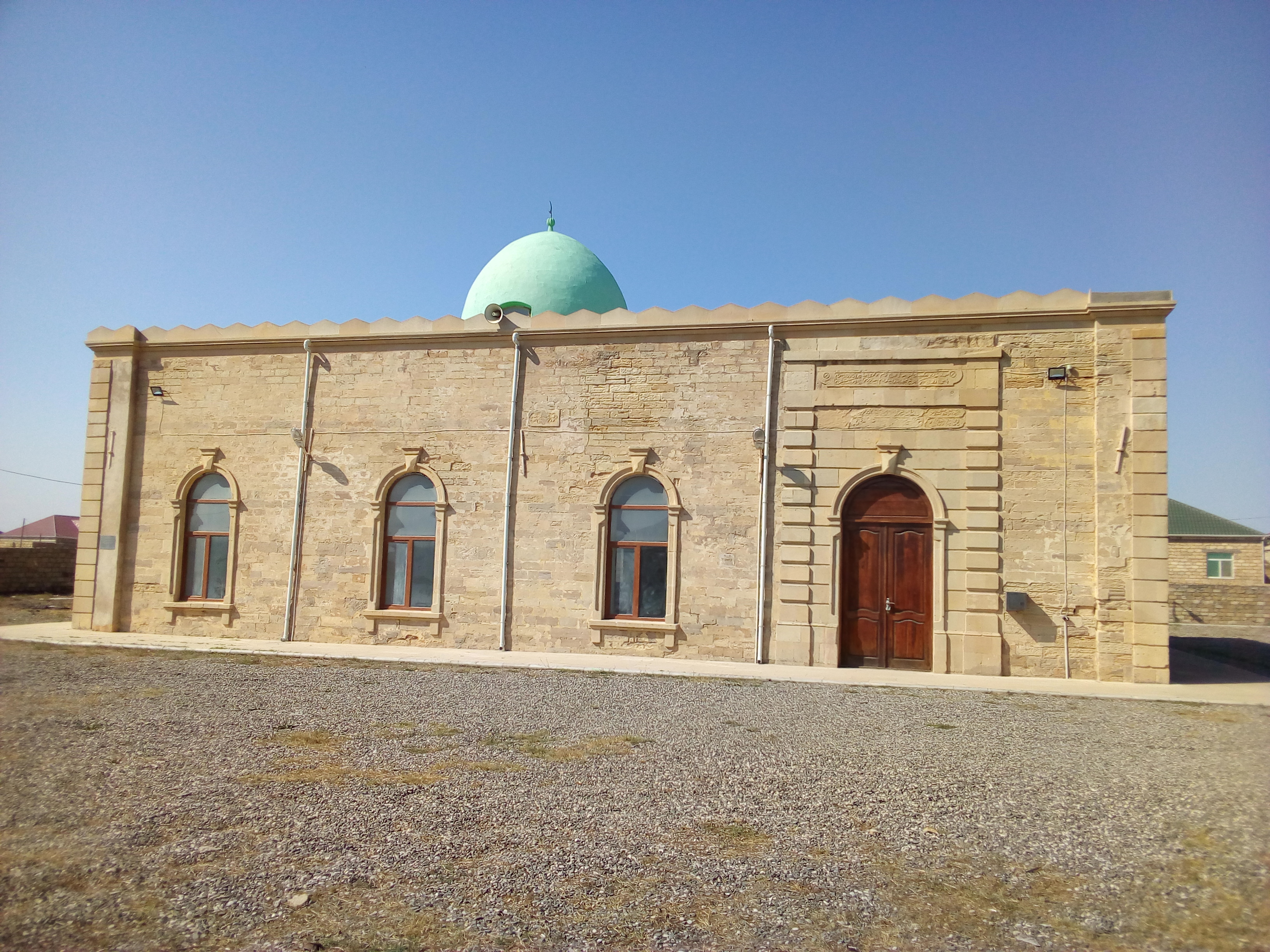

- Location within Azerbaijan
- Coordinates: 40°31′56″N 49°42′59″E
- Country: Azerbaijan
- Rayon: Absheron

Population (2024)
  - Total: 37,700
- Time zone: UTC+4 (AZT)
  - Summer (DST): UTC+5 (AZT)

Saray (also, Sarai) is a village and the most populous municipality after the capital Xırdalan, in the Absheron Rayon of Azerbaijan. It has a population of 37,700.

== Notable natives ==
- Mikhail Alakbarov — Hero of the Soviet Union.
- Vali Akhundov — First Secretary of the Communist Party of Azerbaijan SSR (1959–1969).
- Nariman Mamedov - Who is founder of the new settlement of Saray, who moved it from old to a new location (1955).
