= Majmaus-shuara =

Majmaus-shuara (Persian – Poets’ Council) was a 19th-century literary council in Azerbaijan.

It was first held in 1880, in Baku. Mammadagha Jurmi was head of the council. Agadadash Sureyya was his assistant. I. Zulali, M. Dilkhun, A. Vaqif, A. Jannati, A. Yusif, K. Salik, M. Musavvir, M. Azar and others actively participated in the council. Seyid Azim Shirvani also participated as a guest. Members of the council wrote many of poems and ghazals. Most of them were used by mugham singers of Absheron.
