= Binəqədi =

Binagadi Binəqədi
- Municipality
- Location within Azerbaijan
- Coordinates: 40°27′58″N 49°49′40″E
- Country: Azerbaijan
- City: Baku
- Raion: Binəqədi

Population (2011)
  - Total: 37,100
- Time zone: UTC+4 (AZT)
  - Summer (DST): UTC+5 (AZT)

Binəqədi (also, Binagadi, Binagady, Binaghad, and Bonogady) is an urban-type settlement and municipality in the eponymous Binəqədi raion of Baku, Azerbaijan. It is located 7 km (4.3 mi) from the Biləcəri railway station.

== Population ==
According to the Brockhaus and Efron Encyclopedic Dictionary, published in the late 19th to early 20th centuries, there were 156 households in Binəqədi, 670 residents of both sexes, consisting exclusively of Shiite Azerbaijanis, indicated in the ESBE as Tatars. According to the 1893 statistics, the ethnic composition of Binəqədi consisted of Tats.

1959	1970	1979	1989
10,958	12,611	14,835	13,796

== Transport ==
S-1 Metro station is planned in the line Yellow.
