= Seyid Azim Shirvani =

Azerbaijani poet (1835–1888)

- Seyid Əzim Şirvani
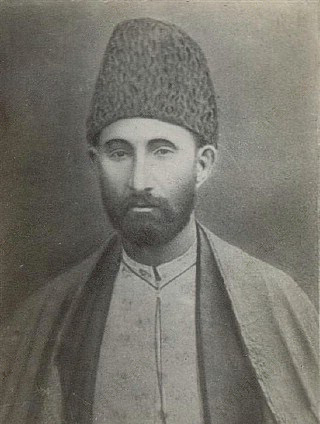
- Born: July 9, 1835; Shamakhy, Russian Empire
- Died: 1 June 1888 (aged 52); Shamakhy, Baku Governorate, Russian Empire
- Occupation: Poet

Seyid Azim Shirvani (Azerbaijani: Seyid Əzim Şirvani; 9 July 1835, Shamakhy – 1 June 1888, Shamakhy) was an Azerbaijani poet and enlightener. He got his first religious education in Iraq. After returning to motherland he refused his spiritual dignity and opened a private school. Seyid Azim Shirvani continued Fuzûlî’s traditions in his love-lyrical poems. In his satirical poems and fables Seyid Azim Shirvani ridiculed priesthood, opposed backwardness and ignorance, called to enlightenment and culture. Contemporary poets consider him their teacher.

== Early life and education ==
Seyid Azim Shirvani was born in Shamakhi, in family of a clergyman. He lost his father early, and his grandfather cared for him. To finish his education he was sent to Baghdad and Egypt, where he got spiritual title of akhund. After returning to Shamakhi Seyid Azim Shirvani was interested in secular sciences, problems of education, and learnt Russian language. He didn’t limit himself to knowing only Persian and Arabic languages and creativity of the eastern authors, but he was also interested in European and Russian literature, acquainted with works of Pushkin, Nekrasov and other famous poets.

Taking care of the nation’s progress, its spiritual emancipation, Seyid Azim opened a Russo-Azerbaijani school in Skamakhi, where was paid attention to studying of secular sciences, and also Azerbaijani and Russian languages. He read poems of Azerbaijani poets and translations of works of such poets as Saadi, Hafiz and Khayyam to his pupils instead of Quran and rules of Sharia. He taught at this school, refusing to be a clergyman. With the lapse of time his interest to social problems, to scientific knowledge changed his attitude to serving a religion. Seeing hypocrisy and sanctimony of clergymen, he was inspired by dream to dedicate himself to creativity and enlightenment of the nation, to propaganda of science and knowledge, which called dissatisfaction and hostile attitude of clergymen. Shirvani was reputed as politically disloyal person and soon he was discharged from teaching.

== Creativity ==
Shirvani was in charge of literary society called “Beyt-us-safa” in Shamakhi. Grouping progressively aiming intelligentsia of the city around him, he communicated with analogical societies in Baku, Guba, Shusha and Ordubad.

In a rich heritage of the poet was broadly represented the poems in genres of ghazal, rubai, garside, marsiye, and also poetic stories, fables, parables, epistles, literary works. He also wrote a literature textbook.

Don’t say me that I’m a giaour, or a Muslim,
He, who well-educated is human.

Shirvani called Caucasian Muslims to acquire knowledge of natural sciences, refuse superstition and fanaticism, follow the road of progress and cultural renaissance (“Address to Caucasian Muslims” poem). In connection with opening ceremony of Pushkin's monument in Moscow, in 1880, Shirvani wrote a poem to Pushkin, where he told about the great importance of poetical heritage of Russian poet for nations of East and the whole world. Decisive orientation of Shirvani to Russian culture was reflected in his creative and pedagogical activity.

Satire takes an important place in Shirvani's literary heritage, which became a leading area in Azerbaijani literature in the second half of the 19th century due to the creativity of the poet. There is something gloomy and grotesque in his stories, parables and poems, though they are finished by optimistic and moralizing ending in traditional enlightening spirit: knowledge, strong mind, humanity, reasonable rules are called to save people from cruelty, unfairness, shabby passions and stupidity. But a light coloring, democratic atmosphere of faith in humanity of Akhundov were lost.

Seyid Azim combined the best features of Akhundov's democratic government, Fuzuli and Vagif’s lyric, Zakir’s satire and followed their traditions. Seyid Azim’s poetry is notable for variety of themes and genres. His ghazals are graceful and lyric.

His stories and fables are also heard sharply: “Bribe to the God”, “Burial of a dog”, “Satan”, “Khan and a peasant”. Satirical poetry of Shirvani paved the way for the future development of this genre, which found implementation in M.A.Sabir’s creativity in the beginning of the 20th century.
