= Shemakha uezd =

Coordinates: 40°37′49″N 48°38′29″E

Shemakha uezd Шемахинский уезд
- Uezd
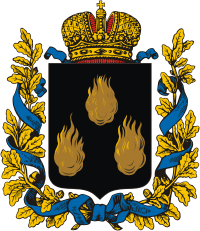
- Coat of arms

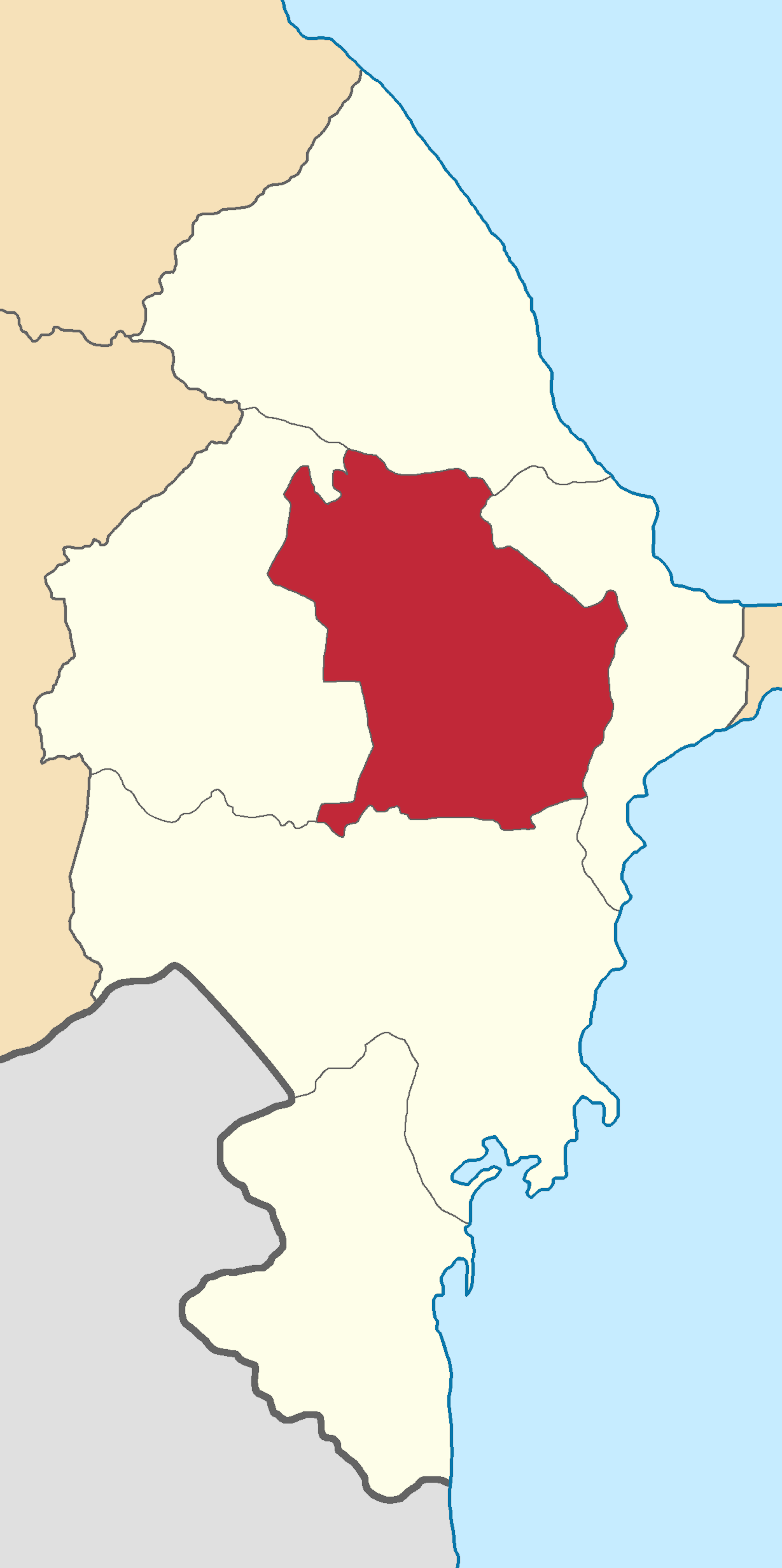
- Location in the Baku Governorate
- Country: Russian Empire
- Viceroyalty: Caucasus
- Governorate: Baku
- Established: 1840
- Abolished: 1929
- Capital: Shemakha (present-day Shamakhi)

Area
  - Total: 7,540.79 km^{2} (2,911.52 sq mi)

Population (1916)
  - Total: 161,552
  - Density: 21.4238/km^{2} (55.4873/sq mi)
  - Urban: 17.18%
  - Rural: 82.82%

The Shemakha uezd (Note: Russian: Шемахинский уезд, pre-reform orthography: Шемахинскій уѣздъ, romanized: Shemakhinskiy uyezd [ʂɨməxʲɪnskʲɪj ʊ(j)ɪst]; Azerbaijani: شماخی قضاسی, romanized: Şamāxı qaz̤āsı) was a county (uezd) within the Baku Governorate of the Russian Empire, and then of Azerbaijan Democratic Republic and Azerbaijan SSR until its formal abolishment in 1929. The county was located in the central part of the Baku Governorate, bordering the Javad uezd to the south, Baku uezd to the east, Geokchay uezd to the west and Kuba uezd to the north. The administrative centre of the county was the city of Shemakha (present-day Shamakhi).

== Administrative divisions ==
The prefectures (участки, uchastki) of the Shemakha uezd in 1917 were as follows:

| Name | Administrative centre | 1912 population | Area |
|---|---|---|---|
| Abdulyanskiy prefecture (Абдульянский участок) | Chernovodsk | 28,814 | 2,055.28 square versts (2,339.04 km^{2}; 903.11 mi^{2}) |
| Kabristanskiy prefecture (Кабристанский участок) | Marazy (Gobustan) | 45,726 | 3,121.22 square versts (3,552.14 km^{2}; 1,371.49 mi^{2}) |
| Koshunskiy prefecture (Кошунский участок) | Shemakha (Shamakhi) | 53,734 | 1,449.49 square versts (1,649.61 km^{2}; 636.92 mi^{2}) |

== History ==
The county was established in 1840 and was initially made part of the Caspian Oblast, and later became the capital of the Shemakha Governorate in 1846. But due to an earthquake in 1859, the city and most of the county suffered great damage. Subsequently, capital of the Shemakha Governorate was moved from Shemakha to Baku and the governorate was renamed Baku Governorate.

== Demographics ==
=== Russian Empire Census ===
According to the Russian Empire Census, the Shemakha uezd had a population of 121,842 on 28 January [O.S. 15 January] 1897, including 64,732 men and 57,110 women. The majority of the population indicated Tatar (Note: Before 1918, Azerbaijanis were generally known as "Tatars". This term, employed by the Russians, referred to Turkic-speaking Muslims of the South Caucasus. After 1918, with the establishment of the Azerbaijan Democratic Republic and "especially during the Soviet era", the Tatar group identified itself as "Azerbaijani".) to be their mother tongue, with significant Armenian, Russian, and Tat speaking minorities.

Linguistic composition of the Shemakha uezd in 1897
| Language | Native speakers | % |
|---|---|---|
| Tatar | 89,840 | 73.73 |
| Armenian | 14,283 | 11.72 |
| Russian | 11,275 | 9.25 |
| Tat | 4,517 | 3.71 |
| Jewish | 1,104 | 0.91 |
| Persian | 149 | 0.12 |
| Lithuanian | 143 | 0.12 |
| Avar-Andean | 126 | 0.10 |
| Polish | 101 | 0.08 |
| Ukrainian | 86 | 0.07 |
| Kyurin | 73 | 0.06 |
| Kazi-Kumukh | 62 | 0.05 |
| Georgian | 49 | 0.04 |
| German | 13 | 0.01 |
| Turkish | 9 | 0.01 |
| Mordovian | 2 | 0.00 |
| Belarusian | 1 | 0.00 |
| Greek | 1 | 0.00 |
| Other | 8 | 0.01 |
| TOTAL | 121,842 | 100.00 |

=== Kavkazskiy kalendar ===
According to the 1917 publication of Kavkazskiy kalendar, the Shemakha uezd had a population of 161,552 on 14 January [O.S. 1 January] 1916, including 86,659 men and 74,893 women, 159,621 of whom were the permanent population, and 1,931 were temporary residents:

| Nationality | Urban | | Rural | | TOTAL | |
| Nationality | Number | % | Number | % | Number | % |
|---|---|---|---|---|---|---|
| Sunni Muslims (Note: Primarily Turco-Tatars.) | 8,605 | 31.01 | 68,569 | 51.25 | 77,174 | 47.77 |
| Shia Muslims (Note: Primarily Tatars.) | 12,522 | 45.12 | 28,010 | 20.93 | 40,532 | 25.09 |
| Armenians | 4,534 | 16.34 | 17,816 | 13.32 | 22,350 | 13.83 |
| Russians | 1,737 | 6.26 | 17,656 | 13.20 | 19,393 | 12.00 |
| Jews | 136 | 0.49 | 1,305 | 0.98 | 1,441 | 0.89 |
| North Caucasians | 214 | 0.77 | 303 | 0.23 | 517 | 0.32 |
| Asiatic Christians | 0 | 0.00 | 139 | 0.10 | 139 | 0.09 |
| Other Europeans | 4 | 0.01 | 2 | 0.00 | 6 | 0.00 |
| TOTAL | 27,752 | 100.00 | 133,800 | 100.00 | 161,552 | 100.00 |

=== Soviet census (1926) ===
In 1926, the population of the county declined to 91,185.

== See also ==
- Shirvan Khanate

== Bibliography ==
- Bournoutian, George A. (2018). Armenia and Imperial Decline: The Yerevan Province, 1900–1914. Milton Park, Abingdon, Oxon: Routledge. ISBN 978-1-351-06260-2. OCLC 1037283914.
- Hovannisian, Richard G. (1971). The Republic of Armenia. Vol. 1: The First Year, 1918–1919. Berkeley: University of California Press. ISBN 978-0520019843.
- Кавказский календарь на 1913 год [Caucasian calendar for 1913] (in Russian) (68th ed.). Tiflis: Tipografiya kantselyarii Ye.I.V. na Kavkaze, kazenny dom. 1913. Archived from the original on 19 April 2022.
- Кавказский календарь на 1917 год [Caucasian calendar for 1917] (in Russian) (72nd ed.). Tiflis: Tipografiya kantselyarii Ye.I.V. na Kavkaze, kazenny dom. 1917. Archived from the original on 4 November 2021.
- Tsutsiev, Arthur (2014). Atlas of the Ethno-Political History of the Caucasus (PDF). Translated by Nora Seligman Favorov. New Haven: Yale University Press. ISBN 9780300153088. Archived (PDF) from the original on 17 June 2023.
