= Baku Governorate =

1846–1917 governorate of the Russian Empire

Coordinates: 40.3667°N 49.8352°E

Baku Governorate Бакинская губерния (Russian)
- Governorate
- Coat of arms

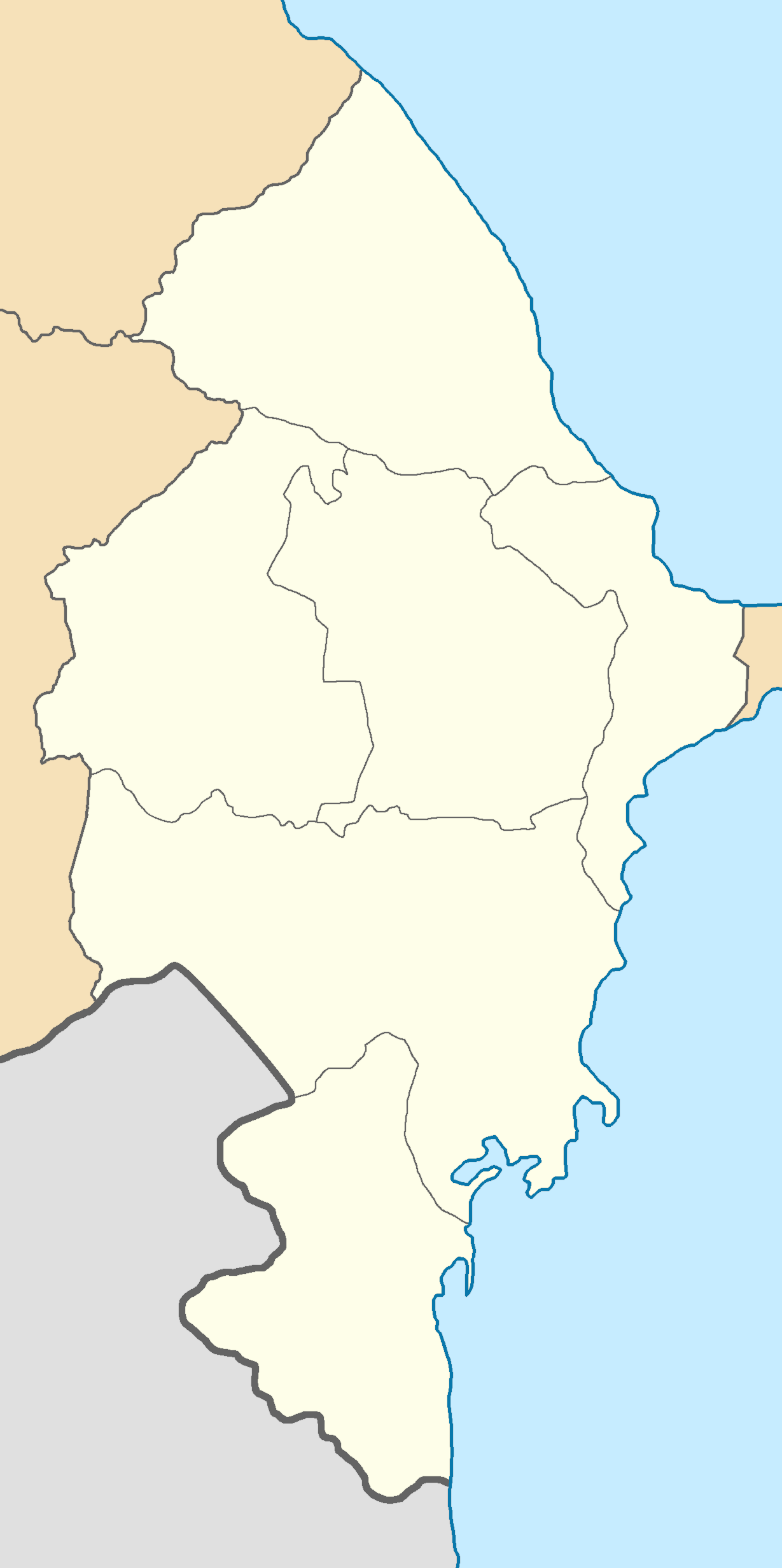
- Administrative map of the Baku Governorate (1905–1917)
- Country: Russian Empire
- Viceroyalty: Caucasus
- Established: 1846
- Abolished: 1920
- Capital: Baku

Area
  - Total: 37,948.97 km^{2} (14,652.18 sq mi)
- Highest elevation (Mount Bazardüzü): 4,466 m (14,652 ft)

Population (1916)
  - Total: 875,746
  - Density: 23.0769/km^{2} (59.7690/sq mi)
  - Urban: 8.28%
  - Rural: 91.72%

The Baku Governorate, (Note: Russian: Бакинская губерния, pre-reform orthography: Бакинская губернія, romanized: Bakinskaya guberniya [bəkʲɪnskəjə ɡʊbʲɪrnʲɪjə]; Azerbaijani: باکو غوبیرنیاسی, romanized: Bākū ğūberniyāsı) known before 1859 as the Shemakha Governorate, (Note: Russian: Шемахинская губерния, pre-reform orthography: Шемахинская губернія, romanized: Shemakhinskaya guberniya [ʂɨməxʲɪnskəjə ɡʊbʲɪrnʲɪjə]; Azerbaijani: شماخی غوبیرنیاسی, romanized: Şamāxı ğūberniyāsı) was a province (guberniya) of the Caucasus Viceroyalty of the Russian Empire, with its center in the booming metropolis and Caspian Sea port of Baku. Area (1897): 34,400 sq. versts, population (1897): 789,659. The Baku Governorate bordered Persia to the south, the Elizavetpol Governorate (the Tiflis and Erivan governorates before 1868) to the west, the Dagestan Oblast to the north, and the Baku gradonachalstvo to the east on the Absheron Peninsula.

== History ==
The governorate was originally established in 1846 as the Shemakha Governorate, replacing what had been several military precincts. Following the catastrophic 1859 Shamakhi earthquake, the capital of the governorate was transferred from Shamakha (Shamakhi) to the fast-growing city of Baku, and on July 12, 1859, the governorate's name was changed accordingly. The coat of arms of the Baku Governorate was instituted on July 5, 1878. Initially, the Baku Governorate included the areas of the former khanates of Karabakh and Shaki until these areas were detached in 1868 to form part of the adjacent Elizavetpol Governorate.

The Armenians were dominant in the commerce of the Baku Governorate, as evidenced by them controlling 29% of enterprises in the province as opposed to the Azerbaijanis owning only 18%. Whilst Armenians enjoyed more favourable treatment under the Russian administration and produced oil tycoons such as Alexander Mantashev, Azerbaijanis made up most of the unskilled low-paid labor jobs and were virtually absent from the administration of the province despite their preponderance. In the early 20th century, Russian official Grigory Golitsyn increased the number of Azerbaijanis in the administration and confiscated properties of the Armenian Apostolic Church, however, his anti-Armenian policies (which provoked the Armenian–Tatar clashes) were later repealed in 1905 under the rule of Illarion Vorontsov-Dashkov.

Upon the establishment of the Azerbaijan Democratic Republic, the Baku Governorate was incorporated into the fledgling state and subsequently separated into a smaller Baku General-Governorate and a Lenkoran General-Governorate, the latter being the location of the Provisional Military Dictatorship of Mughan which was suppressed in spring 1919. The governorate was eventually abolished in its entirety following the establishment of Soviet rule in Azerbaijan in 1920, however, its uezds ("counties") continued to exist until their administrative reorganization into raions ("districts") in 1929–1930.

== Administrative divisions ==
The counties (uezds) of the Baku Governorate in 1917 were as follows:

Name	Administrative centre			Population		Area
Name		1897	1916	1897	1916	Area
Baku uezd (Бакинский уезд)	Baku	182,897	262,422	182,897	16,268	2,610.22 square versts (2,970.59 km^{2}; 1,146.95 mi^{2})
Geokchay uezd (Геокчайский уезд)	Geokchay (Goychay)	2,201	---	117,705	134,098	4,676.58 square versts (5,322.24 km^{2}; 2,054.93 mi^{2})
Javad uezd (Джеватский уезд)	Salyan	11,787	---	90,043	162,305	8,396.97 square versts (9,556.27 km^{2}; 3,689.70 mi^{2})
Kuba uezd (Кубинский уезд)	Kuba (Quba)	15,363	26,956	183,242	198,204	6,308.61 square versts (7,179.59 km^{2}; 2,772.06 mi^{2})
Lenkoran uezd (Ленкоранский уезд)	Lenkoran (Lankaran)	8,733	---	130,987	203,319	4,726.88 square versts (5,379.48 km^{2}; 2,077.03 mi^{2})
Shemakha uezd (Шемахинский уезд)	Shemakha (Shamakhi)	20,007	27,732	121,842	161,552	6,625.99 square versts (7,540.79 km^{2}; 2,911.51 mi^{2})

== Demographics ==
The ethnic group composition of the governorate changed considerably in the latter part of the 19th century. By the beginning of the 20th century, there were 214,700 inhabitants, among them, Russians, Ukrainians and Belarusians consisting of 76.3 thousand (35.5%), Tatars 46 thousand (21.4%), Armenians 42 thousand (19.4%), Persians 25 thousand (11.7%), Jews 9.7 thousand (4.5%), Georgians 4 thousand (1.9%), Germans 3.3 thousand (1.5%), and Kazan Tatars 2.3 thousand (1.1%). Muslims generally lived in the historical centre of Baku (Old Baku), surrounded by the khan's castle in the west of the city. Armenians mostly lived in the industrial zone in the north of the city. During the construction of the new city centre, various ethnic groups started to move to different districts.

=== Russian Empire Census ===
According to the Russian Empire Census, the Baku Governorate had a population of 826,716 on 28 January [O.S. 16 January] 1897, including 458,065 men and 368,651 women. The majority of the population indicated Tatar (Note: Before 1918, Azerbaijanis were generally known as "Tatars". This term, employed by the Russians, referred to Turkic-speaking Muslims of the South Caucasus. After 1918, with the establishment of the Azerbaijan Democratic Republic and "especially during the Soviet era", the Tatar group identified itself as "Azerbaijani".) to be their mother tongue, with significant Tat, Russian, Armenian, Kyurin, and Talysh speaking minorities.

Linguistic composition of the Baku Governorate in 1897
Language	Native speakers	%
Tatar	485,146	58.68
Tat	89,519	10.83
Russian	73,632	8.91
Armenian	52,233	6.32
Kyurin	48,192	5.83
Talysh	34,994	4.23
Kazi-Kumukh	11,811	1.43
Jewish	8,172	0.99
Persian	5,973	0.72
German	3,430	0.41
Ukrainian	3,372	0.41
Avar-Andean	2,898	0.35
Georgian	1,616	0.20
Polish	1,439	0.17
Turkish	1,155	0.14
Belarusian	677	0.08
Mordovian	531	0.06
Swedish	347	0.04
Greek	278	0.03
Lithuanian	272	0.03
Other	1,029	0.12
TOTAL	826,716	100.00

Religious composition of the Baku Governorate in 1897
Faith	Male	Female	Both	
Faith	Male	Female	Number	%
Muslim	372,770	303,473	676,243	81.80
Eastern Orthodox	32,164	23,926	56,090	6.78
Armenian Apostolic	31,403	21,160	52,563	6.36
Old Believer	11,075	10,837	21,912	2.65
Judaism	6,599	6,154	12,753	1.54
Lutheran	1,911	1,869	3,780	0.46
Roman Catholic	1,574	644	2,218	0.27
Baptist	313	350	663	0.08
Armenian Catholic	96	109	205	0.02
Reformed	102	88	190	0.02
Karaite	3	5	8	0.00
Anglican	4	3	7	0.00
Buddhist	5	0	5	0.00
Mennonite	1	1	2	0.00
Other Christian denomination	42	31	73	0.01
Other non-Christian denomination	3	1	4	0.00
TOTAL	458,065	368,651	826,716	100.00

=== Kavkazskiy kalendar ===
According to the 1917 publication of Kavkazskiy kalendar, the Baku Governorate had a population of 875,746 on 14 January [O.S. 1 January] 1916, including 465,711 men and 410,035 women, 838,717 of whom were the permanent population, and 37,029 were temporary residents:

Nationality	Urban		Rural		TOTAL	
Nationality	Number	%	Number	%	Number	%
Shia Muslims (Note: Primarily Tatars.)	34,499	47.58	395,319	49.22	429,818	49.08
Sunni Muslims (Note: Primarily Turco-Tatars.)	12,905	17.80	249,851	31.11	262,756	30.00
Russians	3,788	5.22	68,847	8.57	72,635	8.29
North Caucasians	631	0.87	49,144	6.12	49,775	5.68
Armenians	5,663	7.81	37,258	4.64	42,921	4.90
Jews	14,948	20.62	2,613	0.33	17,561	2.01
Asiatic Christians	22	0.03	139	0.02	161	0.02
Other Europeans	53	0.07	36	0.00	89	0.01
Georgians	0	0.00	30	0.00	30	0.00
TOTAL	72,509	100.00	803,237	100.00	875,746	100.00

== Governors ==
- Konstantin Tarkhanov-Mouravov, 1859–1863
- Mikhail Kolyubakin, 1863–1872
- Dmitry Staroselsky, 1872–1875
- Valery Pozen, 1875–1882
- Justin von Huebsch Grostal, 1882–1888
- Vladimir Rogge, 1888–1899
- Dmitry Odintsov, 1899–1904
- Mikhail Nakashidze, 1904–1905
- Andrei Fadeyev, 1905
- Vladimir Alyshevsky, 1905–1915
- Leo Potulov, 1916–1917

=== Azerbaijan Democratic Republic period ===
- Museyib bey Akhijanov, 1918–5 February 1919
- Rashid bey Akhundzade, 5 February 1919–25 August 1919
- Amir bey Narimanbeyov, 2 September 1919–April 1920

== Bibliography ==
- Bournoutian, George A. (2018). Armenia and Imperial Decline: The Yerevan Province, 1900–1914. Milton Park, Abingdon, Oxon: Routledge. ISBN 978-1-351-06260-2. OCLC 1037283914.
- Hovannisian, Richard G. (1971). The Republic of Armenia. Vol. 1: The First Year, 1918–1919. Berkeley: University of California Press. ISBN 978-0520019843.
- Кавказский календарь на 1917 год [Caucasian calendar for 1917] (in Russian) (72nd ed.). Tiflis: Tipografiya kantselyarii Ye.I.V. na Kavkaze, kazenny dom. 1917. Archived from the original on 4 November 2021.
- Tsutsiev, Arthur (2014). Atlas of the Ethno-Political History of the Caucasus (PDF). Translated by Nora Seligman Favorov. New Haven: Yale University Press. ISBN 9780300153088. Archived (PDF) from the original on 17 June 2023.
