= 1859 Shamakhi earthquake =

Earthquake in Azerbaijan

- Location within Azerbaijan
- Local date: June 11, 1859
- Magnitude: 5.9
- Depth: 10 km (6.2 mi)
- Epicenter: 40.7°N 48.5°E
- Areas affected: Shamakhi, Baku Governorate, Russian Empire (present-day Azerbaijan Republic)
- Total damage: Moderate
- Max. intensity: MMI IX (Violent)
- Casualties: 100 fatalities

The 1859 Shamakhi earthquake struck Shamakhi in the Baku Governorate (present-day Azerbaijan Republic) of the Russian Empire, on 11 June. The earthquake had an estimated magnitude of 5.9 and caused moderate damage and killed approximately 100 people.

== See also ==
- List of earthquakes in Azerbaijan
