= Law on Abolishment of Nagorno-Karabakh Autonomous Oblast =

1991 Azerbaijani law stripping Nagorno-Karabakh of autonomous status

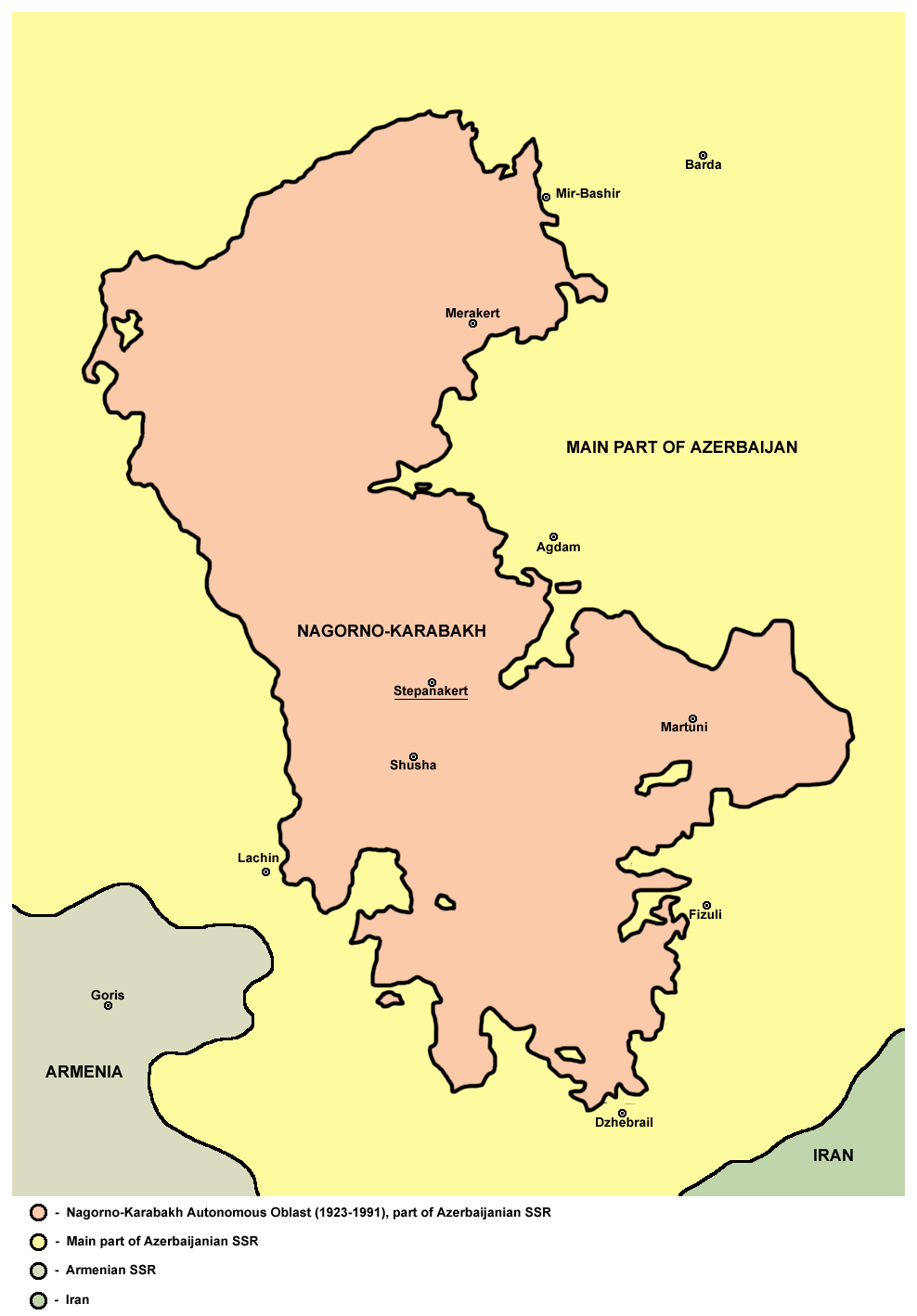
The administrative districts of the Nagorno-Karabakh Autonomous Oblast during the Soviet era.

The Law on Abolishment of Nagorno-Karabakh Autonomous Oblast (or the resolution No. 279-XII) was a motion passed by the Supreme Soviet of the Azerbaijan Republic and signed into law by the President of Azerbaijan Ayaz Mutalibov on November 26, 1991. The law had been prompted by a vote in the National Assembly of the Nagorno-Karabakh Autonomous Oblast in favor of uniting itself with the Armenian SSR on 20 February 1988. The vote was followed by an independence referendum in 1991 which was boycotted by the Azerbaijani population of the Oblast; most voted in favor of independence. While these votes and elections had mainly been conducted in a relatively peaceful manner, in the following months, as the Soviet Union disintegrated, it gradually grew into an increasingly violent conflict between ethnic Armenians and ethnic Azerbaijanis. Both sides claimed that ethnic cleansing was being carried out. The declaration of secession from Azerbaijan was the final result of a territorial conflict regarding the land.

== History ==
The Nagorno-Karabakh Autonomous Oblast (NKAO) was created as an autonomous oblast by carving out the mountainous districts of Azerbaijan which constituted historic Karabakh within the Azerbaijan SSR from July 7, 1923. The NKAO included territories of the former Javanshir, Shusha, Jabrayil uyezds and a part of Qubadli which was part of the Zangezur Uyezd. The Russian term Nagorno (Mountainous) was affixed to the Turco-Persian name Karabagh (Black Garden) and the name of the oblast was officially changed to the Nagorno-Karabakh Autonomous Oblast in 1937. In 1988, Armenians of Nagorno-Karabakh demanded the transfer of the NKAO to the Armenian SSR. Following the escalation of the Nagorno-Karabakh conflict, Azerbaijan abolished the Nagorno-Karabakh Autonomous Oblast on November 26, 1991, rearranging the administrative division and theoretically bringing the territory under the direct control of Azerbaijan.

== Provisions ==
Resolution No. 279-XII discussed in the Azerbaijani Parliament stated that whereas the existence of the Nagorno-Karabakh Autonomous Oblast created in 1923 brought tensions between the Azerbaijani and Armenian peoples; ran counter to the national interests of Azerbaijan; and created the basis and conditions for Armenian nationalists to destroy all ethnic, historical, political, economic and moral values and riches of Azerbaijan, the parliament thus considered creation of the oblast to be illegitimate. The text questioned why an enclave with an Armenian majority had been created on Azerbaijani territory while no cultural autonomy was given to half a million Azerbaijanis in Armenia, whom the text claimed were being deported en masse. The resolution condemned the acts of Armenian militants in Karabakh and the policies of the Armenian Republic conducted in violation of Azerbaijan's territorial integrity. The Parliament called for the protection of the sovereignty of Azerbaijan and for full integration of the mountainous part with the rest of the Karabakh region of Azerbaijan.

In compliance with Article 68, Section 3, Item 2 of Clause 104 of the Constitution of the Azerbaijan Republic and Article 4 of the Constitution Act on the State Sovereignty of the Azerbaijan Republic, the Nagorno-Karabakh Autonomous Republic was abolished. The Decree on Establishment of Nagorno-Karabakh Oblast of the Azerbaijan Central Executive Committee dated July 7, 1923, and the Law on the Nagorno-Karabakh Autonomous Oblast of the Azerbaijan SSR dated June 16, 1981, were declared to be defunct by the Parliament of the Azerbaijan Republic.

The cities of Stepanakert, Mardakert, and Martuni were renamed to their respective Azeri names. Stepanakert was renamed to Khankendi, Mardakert to Aghdara, Mardakert District to Aghdara District, Martuni to Khojavend, and Martuni District to Khojavend District. Askeran District and Hadrut District were abolished. Khojali District was established with its administrative center in Khojaly and the abolished Askeran District was incorporated into it. The abolished Hadrut District was incorporated into the Khojavend District.

== See also ==
- List of United Nations Security Council resolutions on the Nagorno-Karabakh conflict
