= Aresh uezd =

Coordinates: 40°39′00″N 47°28′34″E

Aresh uezd Арешскій уѣздъ
- Uezd
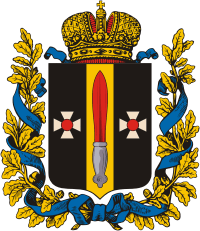
- Coat of arms

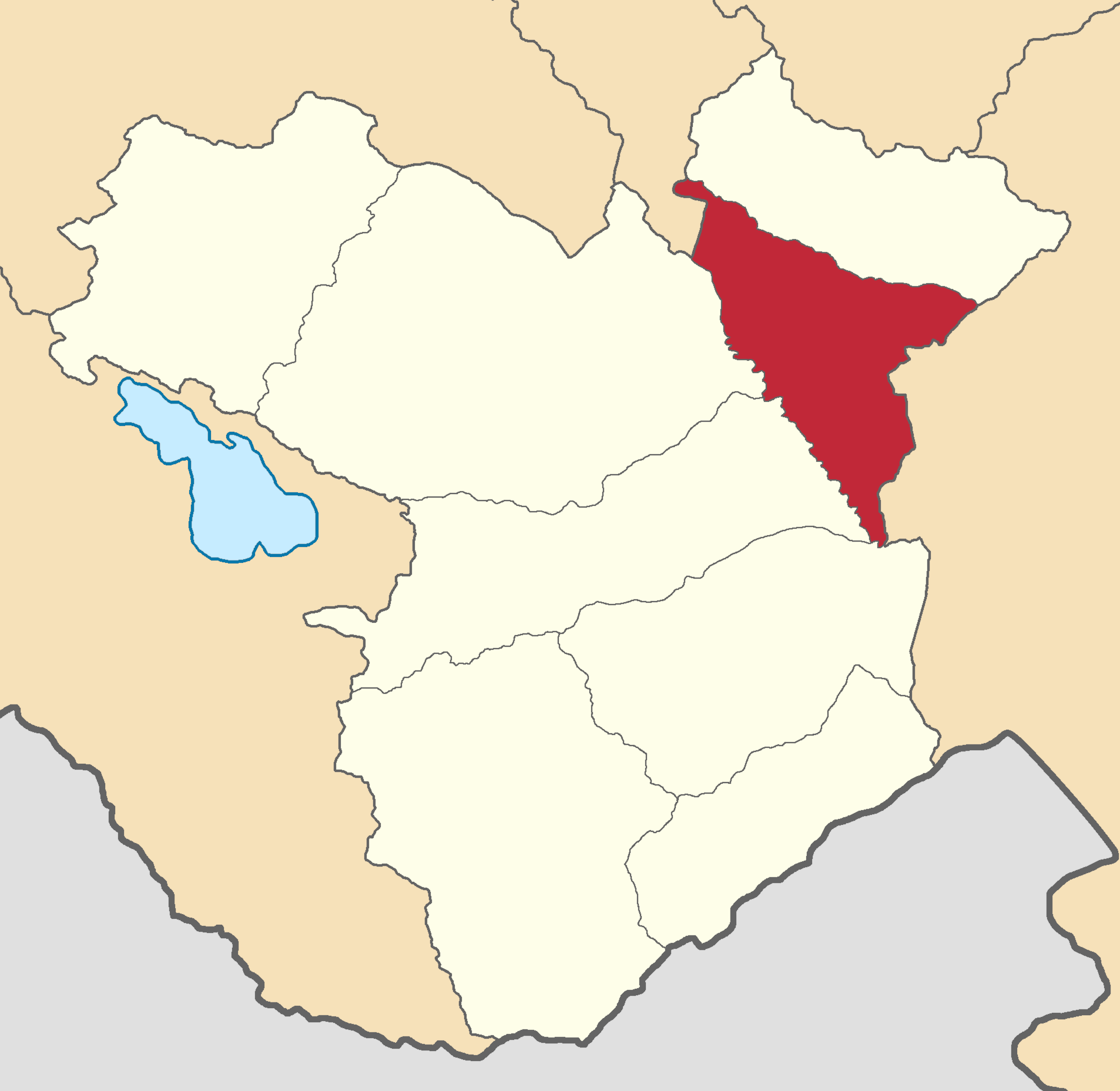
- Location in the Elizavetpol Governorate
- Country: Russian Empire
- Viceroyalty: Caucasus
- Governorate: Elizavetpol
- Established: 1874
- Abolished: 1929
- Capital: Aresh (present-day Agdash)

Area
  - Total: 2,638.21 km^{2} (1,018.62 sq mi)

Population (1916)
  - Total: 99,400
  - Density: 37.7/km^{2} (97.6/sq mi)
  - Rural: 100.00%

The Aresh uezd, (Note: Russian: Аре́шскій уѣ́здъ, romanized: Aréshsky uyézd; Azerbaijani: آریش قضاسی, romanized: Āreş qaz̤āsı) later known as the Agdash uezd, (Note: Russian: Агдашский уезд, romanized: Agdashskiy uyezd; Azerbaijani: آغداش قضاسی, romanized: Āğdāş qaz̤āsı) was a county (uezd) of the Elizavetpol Governorate of the Russian Empire and later of the Azerbaijan Democratic Republic with its center in Aresh (present-day Agdash) from 1874 until its formal abolition in 1929 by Soviet authorities.

== Geography ==
The Aresh uezd was located in the northeastern section of Elizavetpol Governorate, on the eastern bank of the Kura River, bordering the Baku Governorate to the east, the Nukha uezd to the north, the Elizavetpol uezd to the northwest and Jebrail uezd to the southwest. The area of the uezd was 2822.9 square verst. The territory of the county was mainly made up of lowlands. The county capital was initially in Uchkovakh, later being moved to Agdash, which was considered the largest cotton-trading center in the lowlands of Transcaucasia.

== History ==
The territory of Aresh uezd was located in the Turyanchay River basin. The area was called Aresh (Azerbaijani: Ərəş) in the Middle Ages and formed a part of Shirvan Baylarbaylik which was gradually made significantly weaker after repeated Ottoman-Safavid conflicts on its territory, eventually being subdued into the Shaki Khanate in the 1750s.

After the establishment of Russian rule, Aresh was a part of Nukha uezd of Baku Governorate, however, in 1874, the territory was detached and established as a separate Aresh uezd of the newly established Elizavetpol Governorate in 1868.

The Aresh uezd was formally abolished by Soviet authorities in 1929, and superseded by the Agdash Rayon, which was established in its place in 1930.

== Administrative divisions ==
The subcounties (uchastoks) of the Aresh uezd in 1912 were as follows:

| Name | 1912 population | Area |
|---|---|---|
| 1-y uchastok (1-й участокъ) | 34,078 | 575.84 square versts (655.34 km^{2}; 253.03 mi^{2}) |
| 2-y uchastok (2-й участокъ) | 28,410 | 890.66 square versts (1,013.63 km^{2}; 391.36 mi^{2}) |
| 3-y uchastok (3-й участокъ) | 10,420 | 851.60 square versts (969.17 km^{2}; 374.20 mi^{2}) |

== Economy ==
The population was engaged primarily in agricultural farming and gardening. During summers, they would take the cattle to the mountains and return only in September. Wool production played an important role in the economy of uezd.

== Demographics ==
=== Russian Empire Census ===
According to the Russian Empire Census, the Aresh uezd had a population of 67,277 on 28 January [O.S. 15 January] 1897, including 36,623 men and 30,654 women. The plurality of the population indicated Tatar (Note: Before 1918, Azerbaijanis were generally known as "Tatars". This term, employed by the Russians, referred to Turkic-speaking Muslims of the South Caucasus. After 1918, with the establishment of the Azerbaijan Democratic Republic and "especially during the Soviet era", the Tatar group identified itself as "Azerbaijani".) to be their mother tongue, with significant Armenian and Kyurin (Lezgian) speaking minorities.

Linguistic composition of the Aresh uezd in 1897
| Language | Native speakers | % |
|---|---|---|
| Tatar | 47,133 | 70.06 |
| Armenian | 13,822 | 20.54 |
| Kyurin | 5,869 | 8.72 |
| Russian | 155 | 0.23 |
| Kazi-Kumukh | 128 | 0.19 |
| Avar-Andean | 71 | 0.11 |
| Jewish | 34 | 0.05 |
| Greek | 8 | 0.01 |
| Persian | 8 | 0.01 |
| Georgian | 8 | 0.01 |
| Belarusian | 7 | 0.01 |
| Polish | 6 | 0.01 |
| Udi | 4 | 0.01 |
| German | 1 | 0.00 |
| Other | 23 | 0.03 |
| TOTAL | 67,277 | 100.00 |

=== Kavkazskiy kalendar ===
According to the 1917 publication of Kavkazskiy kalendar, the Aresh uezd had a population of 99,400 on 14 January [O.S. 1 January] 1916, including 53,144 men and 46,256 women, 97,280 of whom were the permanent population, and 2,180 were temporary residents. The statistics indicated Sunni Muslims to be the overwhelming majority of the population of the county with significant Armenian and Shia Muslim minorities:

| Nationality | Number | % |
|---|---|---|
| Sunni Muslims (Note: Primarily Turco-Tatars.) | 62,155 | 62.53 |
| Armenians | 19,161 | 19.28 |
| Shia Muslims (Note: Primarily Tatars.) | 16,935 | 17.04 |
| Russians | 1,047 | 1.05 |
| Roma | 37 | 0.04 |
| Asiatic Christians | 30 | 0.03 |
| Jews | 15 | 0.02 |
| Other Europeans | 13 | 0.01 |
| Georgians | 7 | 0.01 |
| TOTAL | 99,400 | 100.00 |

== Bibliography ==
- Bournoutian, George A. (2018). Armenia and Imperial Decline: The Yerevan Province, 1900–1914. Milton Park, Abingdon, Oxon: Routledge. ISBN 978-1-351-06260-2. OCLC 1037283914.
- Hovannisian, Richard G. (1971). The Republic of Armenia. Vol. 1: The First Year, 1918–1919. Berkeley: University of California Press. ISBN 978-0520019843.
- Кавказский календарь на 1913 год [Caucasian calendar for 1913] (in Russian) (68th ed.). Tiflis: Tipografiya kantselyarii Ye.I.V. na Kavkaze, kazenny dom. 1913. Archived from the original on 19 April 2022.
- Кавказский календарь на 1917 год [Caucasian calendar for 1917] (in Russian) (72nd ed.). Tiflis: Tipografiya kantselyarii Ye.I.V. na Kavkaze, kazenny dom. 1917. Archived from the original on 4 November 2021.
- Tsutsiev, Arthur (2014). Atlas of the Ethno-Political History of the Caucasus (PDF). Translated by Nora Seligman Favorov. New Haven: Yale University Press. ISBN 9780300153088. Archived (PDF) from the original on 17 June 2023.
