= Ashraf Hasanov =

Azerbaijani conductor

Ashraf Hasanov Əşrəf Həsənov
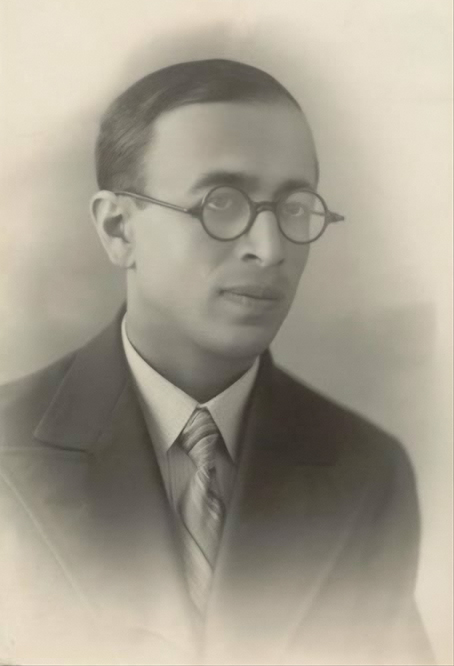

Background information
- Born: January 29, 1909; Nukha, Nukha Uyezd, Elisabethpol Governorate, Russian Empire
- Died: August 9, 1983 (aged 74); Baku, Azerbaijan SSR, USSR
- Occupation: conductor
- Education: Azerbaijan State Conservatoire; Moscow Conservatory
- Awards: People's Artist of the Azerbaijan SSR Honored Artist of the Azerbaijan SSR

Ashraf Hasan oghlu Hasanov (Azerbaijani: Əşrəf Həsən oğlu Həsənov, January 4, 1909 — August 9, 1983) was an Azerbaijani conductor, and pedagogue. He was awarded the title People's Artist of the Azerbaijan SSR.

== Biography ==
Ashraf Hasanov was born on January 4, 1909, in Nukha, Russian Empire. He studied in the orchestra class of the Azerbaijan State Conservatory in 1927–1932 and in the conducting class of the Moscow Conservatory in 1933–1938.

In 1938–1950 he conducted the symphony orchestra under the Azerbaijan Radio Committee. In 1932 and 1938–1979 he worked as a conductor at Azerbaijan State Opera and Ballet Theatre. In 1949–1962 he headed the opera preparation department at Azerbaijan State Conservatory. He was an associate professor.

Ashraf Hasanov conducted Azerbaijani and Western European operas and ballets such as "Leyli and Majnun", "Koroghlu" (Uzeyir Hajibeyov), "La traviata", "Aida" (Giuseppe Verdi), "Carmen" (Georges Bizet) at Azerbaijan State Opera and Ballet Theatre. He has toured in Georgia, Russia, Turkey, Ukraine, Bulgaria, Germany, Czech Republic and other countries.

A. Hasanov died on August 9, 1983, in Baku.

== Awards ==
- People's Artist of the Azerbaijan SSR — June 10, 1959
- Honored Artist of the Azerbaijan SSR — April 23, 1940
- Order of the Badge of Honour — April 17, 1938
- Honorary Decree of the Presidium of the Supreme Soviet of the Azerbaijan SSR — January 23, 1979

== Literature ==
- Rəhimli, İlham (2016). Azərbaycan Teatr Ensiklopediyası [Azerbaijani Theatre Encyclopedia]. Baku: Azərnəşr. ISBN 978-9952-8306-3-7.
- Guliev, Jamil, ed. (1987). "Фрост – Шүштəр" [Frost – Shushtar]. Азәрбајҹан Совет Енсиклопедијасы. Vol. X. Baku: Азәрбајҹан Совет Енсиклопедијасынын Баш Редаксиjасы.
- "Ə. Һ. Һəсəнов". Коммунист. No. 183. August 10, 1983.
