= Elisavetpol =

Elisavetpol may refer to

- Elizavetpol Governorate, a guberniya of the Russian Empire
- Elizavetpol uezd, an uezd of the Russian Empire
- Ganja, Azerbaijan, Azerbaijan's second most populous city
