= Shusha uezd =

Coordinates: 39°45.5′N 46°44.9′E

Shusha uezd Шушинскій уѣздъ
- Uezd
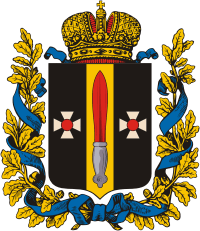
- Coat of arms

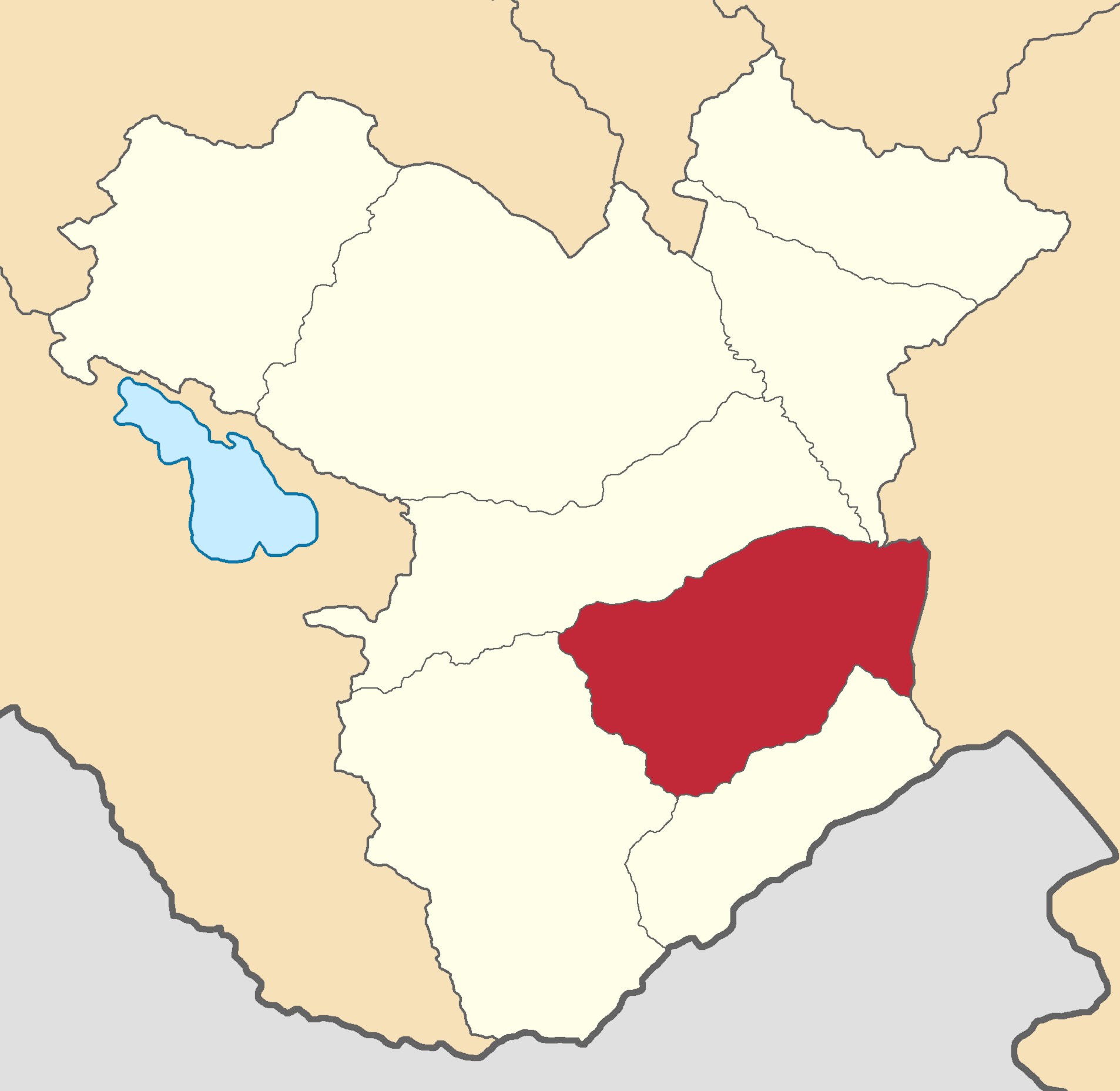
- Location in the Elizavetpol Governorate
- Country: Russian Empire
- Viceroyalty: Caucasus
- Governorate: Elizavetpol
- Established: 1840
- Abolished: 1921
- Capital: Shusha

Area
  - Total: 5,033.97 km^{2} (1,943.63 sq mi)

Population (1916)
  - Total: 188,745
  - Density: 37.4943/km^{2} (97.1097/sq mi)
  - Urban: 23.24%
  - Rural: 76.76%

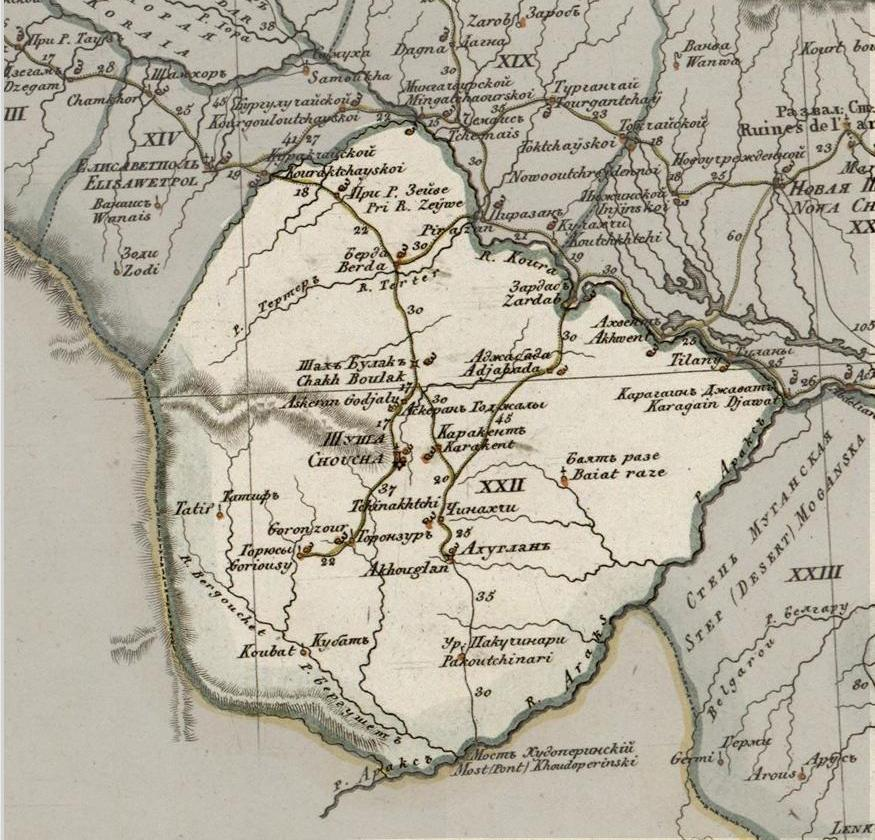
Karabakh Khanate on a map of 1823

The Shusha uezd (Note: Russian: Шуши́нскій уѣ́здъ, romanized: Shushínsky uyézd; Azerbaijani: شوشا قضاسی, romanized: Şūşā qaz̤āsı; Armenian: Շուշիի գավառ, romanized: Šowšii gavaṙ) was a county (uezd) of the Elizavetpol Governorate of the Russian Empire, and then of the Ganja Governorate of Azerbaijan Democratic Republic with its center in Shusha in 1840–1921.

== Geography ==
The Shusha uezd was located in the southeastern portion of Elizavetpol Governorate, bordering the contiguous Jevanshir uezd on the north, the Jebrail uezd to the south, the Zangezur uezd to the west and the Baku Governorate in the east. The area covered 4,316 square verst, or 4,911 km (3,052 mi). The county was normally divided into the mountainous, submountanous and lowland parts. The mountains covered the southwestern part of the county and were part of the Lesser Caucasus range, reaching as high as 8,988 ft (2,740 m) above sea level. The gorges and valleys towards the northeast made up the submountainous areas of the uezd. The lowland part of the county is rich with rivers. The Khachinchay river formed the natural boundary between the Shusha and the Javanshir uezds.

== History ==
The territories of Shusha uezd once formed part of the Karabakh Khanate until the latter's dissolution in 1813, when the area was ceded by Qajar Iran to the Russian Empire in accordance with the Treaty of Gulistan. Russian rule was officially established in the region by 1823.

On April 10, 1840 Shusha uezd was established as a separate administrative unit within Caspian Oblast of the empire with Shusha as its capital. From 1846 on, it was an administrative unit of Shemakha Governorate (later renamed to the Baku Governorate in 1859). In 1868, the county was incorporated into the Elizavetpol Governorate. In 1873, the territories of Javanshir and Jabrail of the Shusha uezd were detached and established as separate administrative uezds.

After the dissolution of the Russian Empire and the formation of the independent Transcaucasian republics, including the Azerbaijan Democratic Republic in 1918, the western mountainous districts of the Elizavetpol Governorate including the Shusha, Zangezur, Jebrail, Jevanshir, Kazakh and Elizavetpol uezds became subject to intense territorial disputes between Armenia and Azerbaijan throughout 1918-1920, both of whom included these areas in their territorial pretensions that they presented in memorandums to the Paris Peace Conference.

Since the collapse of Russian authority in the Transcaucasus, the mountainous portion of the county which was overwhelmingly Armenian and included the administrative center of Shusha was governed by the de facto Karabakh Council which vehemently rejected Ottoman and Azerbaijani attempts to subordinate the region. However, following the arrival of British forces in Transcaucasia, the Karabakh Council reluctantly submitted to provisional Azerbaijani rule through the Governor-Generalship of Karabakh, led by Dr. Khosrov bey Sultanov, due to the exerted British pressure on the council in August 1919.

== Administrative divisions ==
The subcounties (uchastoks) of the Shusha uezd in 1912 were as follows:

Name	1912 population	Area
1-y uchastok (1-й участокъ)	31,808	1,024.89 square versts (1,166.39 km^{2}; 450.35 mi^{2})
2-y uchastok (2-й участокъ)	48,915	726.20 square versts (826.46 km^{2}; 319.10 mi^{2})
3-y uchastok (3-й участокъ)	26,604	821.54 square versts (934.96 km^{2}; 360.99 mi^{2})
4-y uchastok (4-й участокъ)	21,027	1,850.65 square versts (2,106.15 km^{2}; 813.19 mi^{2})

== Economy ==
The population was engaged primarily in agriculture and farming in the mountainous areas, gardening, sericulture and cattlebreeding in submountainous areas. The lowland area was used for growing cotton, which produced 20 thousand pounds of cotton per year. Vineyards covered as much as 4,494 desyatinas of land, producing 106,860 lbs of grape. Nearly 10,000 lbs of silk pods were being collected per annum. Cattlebreeding which played an important role in the regional economy accounted 38,888 of cattle, 10,918 buffalos, 133,648 sheep, 3,052 goats, 8,016 horses, 4,052 donkeys, 1,052 mules, 340 camels, 4,052 pigs.

== Demographics ==
=== Russian Empire Census ===
According to the Russian Empire Census, the Shusha uezd had a population of 138,771 on 28 January [O.S. 15 January] 1897, including 74,171 men and 64,600 women. The majority of the population indicated Armenian to be their mother tongue, with significant Tatar (Note: Before 1918, Azerbaijanis were generally known as "Tatars". This term, employed by the Russians, referred to Turkic-speaking Muslims of the South Caucasus. After 1918, with the establishment of the Azerbaijan Democratic Republic and "especially during the Soviet era", the Tatar group identified itself as "Azerbaijani".) and Russian speaking minorities.

Linguistic composition of the Shusha uezd in 1897
Language	Native speakers	%
Armenian	73,953	53.29
Tatar	62,868	45.30
Russian	1,442	1.04
Polish	142	0.10
Kurdish	90	0.06
Romanian	75	0.05
Ukrainian	61	0.04
Georgian	56	0.04
German	17	0.01
Avar-Andean	9	0.01
Persian	8	0.01
Lithuanian	4	0.00
Jewish	4	0.00
Greek	2	0.00
Udi	2	0.00
Belarusian	1	0.00
Kyurin	1	0.00
Other	36	0.03
TOTAL	138,771	100.00

=== Kavkazskiy kalendar ===
According to the 1917 publication of Kavkazskiy kalendar, the Shusha uezd had a population of 188,745 on 14 January [O.S. 1 January] 1916, including 102,134 men and 86,611 women, 182,429 of whom were the permanent population, and 6,316 were temporary residents. The statistics indicated Armenians to be the majority of the population of both the city Shusha and in the rest of the uezd, with a significant Shia Muslim minority:

Nationality	Urban		Rural		TOTAL	
Nationality	Number	%	Number	%	Number	%
Armenians	23,396	53.33	75,413	52.05	98,809	52.35
Shia Muslims (Note: Primarily Tatars.)	19,091	43.52	61,618	42.53	80,709	42.76
Sunni Muslims (Note: Primarily Turco-Tatars.)	30	0.07	4,883	3.37	4,913	2.60
Russians	1,249	2.85	2,842	1.96	4,091	2.17
Other Europeans	35	0.08	56	0.04	91	0.05
Georgians	36	0.08	24	0.02	60	0.03
North Caucasians	25	0.06	31	0.02	56	0.03
Asiatic Christians	0	0.00	9	0.01	9	0.00
Jews	7	0.02	0	0.00	7	0.00
TOTAL	43,869	100.00	144,876	100.00	188,745	100.00

== Bibliography ==
- Bournoutian, George A. (2018). Armenia and Imperial Decline: The Yerevan Province, 1900–1914. Milton Park, Abingdon, Oxon: Routledge. ISBN 978-1-351-06260-2. OCLC 1037283914.
- Hovannisian, Richard G. (1971). The Republic of Armenia. Vol. 1: The First Year, 1918–1919. Berkeley: University of California Press. ISBN 978-0520019843.
- Кавказский календарь на 1913 год [Caucasian calendar for 1913] (in Russian) (68th ed.). Tiflis: Tipografiya kantselyarii Ye.I.V. na Kavkaze, kazenny dom. 1913. Archived from the original on 19 April 2022.
- Кавказский календарь на 1917 год [Caucasian calendar for 1917] (in Russian) (72nd ed.). Tiflis: Tipografiya kantselyarii Ye.I.V. na Kavkaze, kazenny dom. 1917. Archived from the original on 4 November 2021.
- Tsutsiev, Arthur (2014). Atlas of the Ethno-Political History of the Caucasus (PDF). Translated by Nora Seligman Favorov. New Haven: Yale University Press. ISBN 9780300153088. Archived (PDF) from the original on 17 June 2023.
