= Jevanshir uezd =

Coordinates: 40°20′N 46°55′E

Jevanshir uezd Джеванширскій уѣздъ
- Uezd
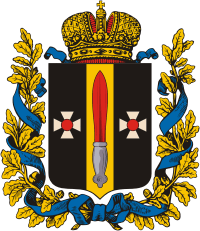
- Coat of arms

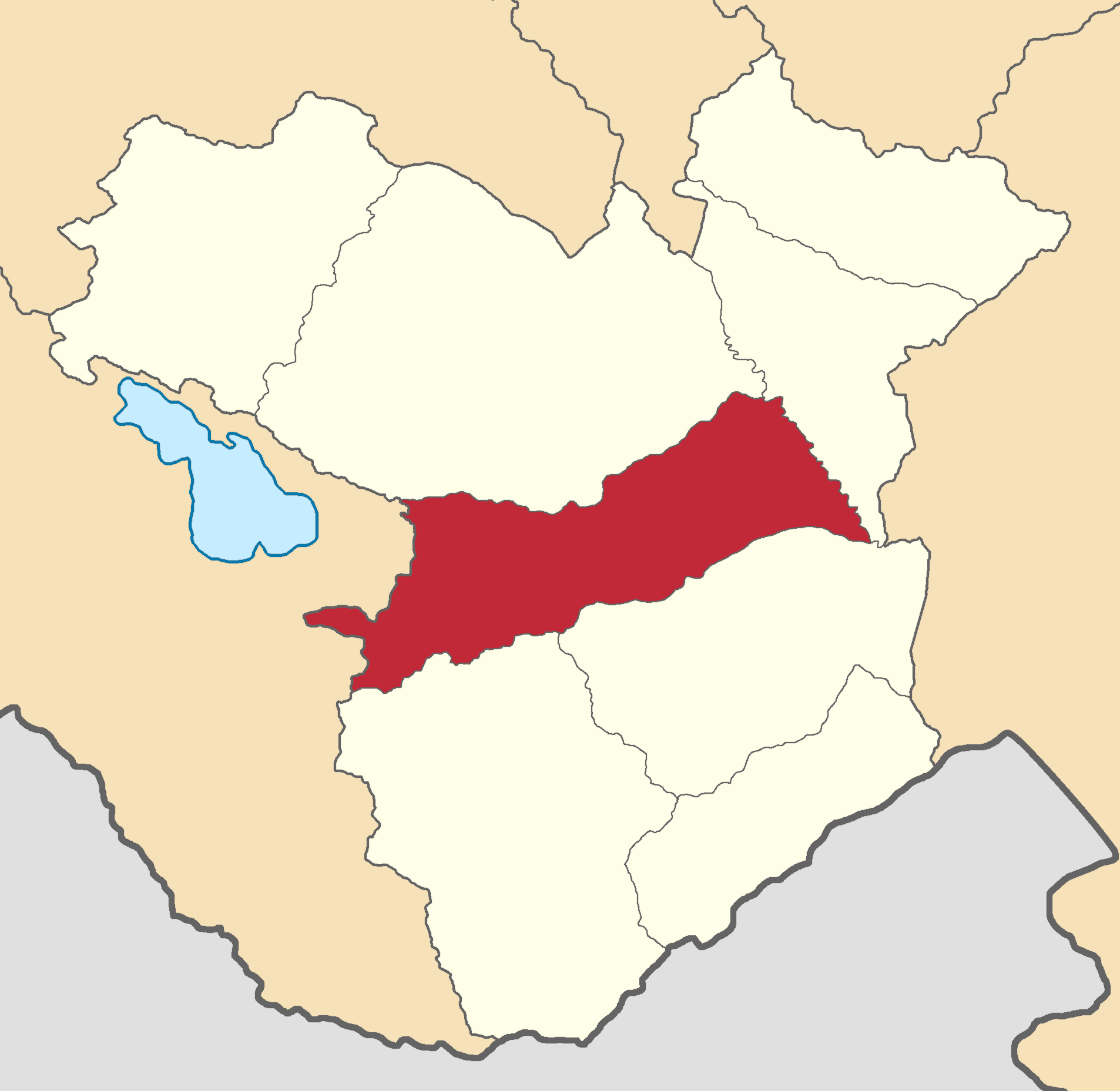
- Location in the Elizavetpol Governorate
- Country: Russian Empire
- Viceroyalty: Caucasus
- Governorate: Elizavetpol
- Established: 1869
- Abolished: 1918
- Capital: Terter (present-day Tartar)

Area
  - Total: 5,296.61 km^{2} (2,045.03 sq mi)

Population (1916)
  - Total: 75,730
  - Density: 14.30/km^{2} (37.03/sq mi)
  - Rural: 100.00%

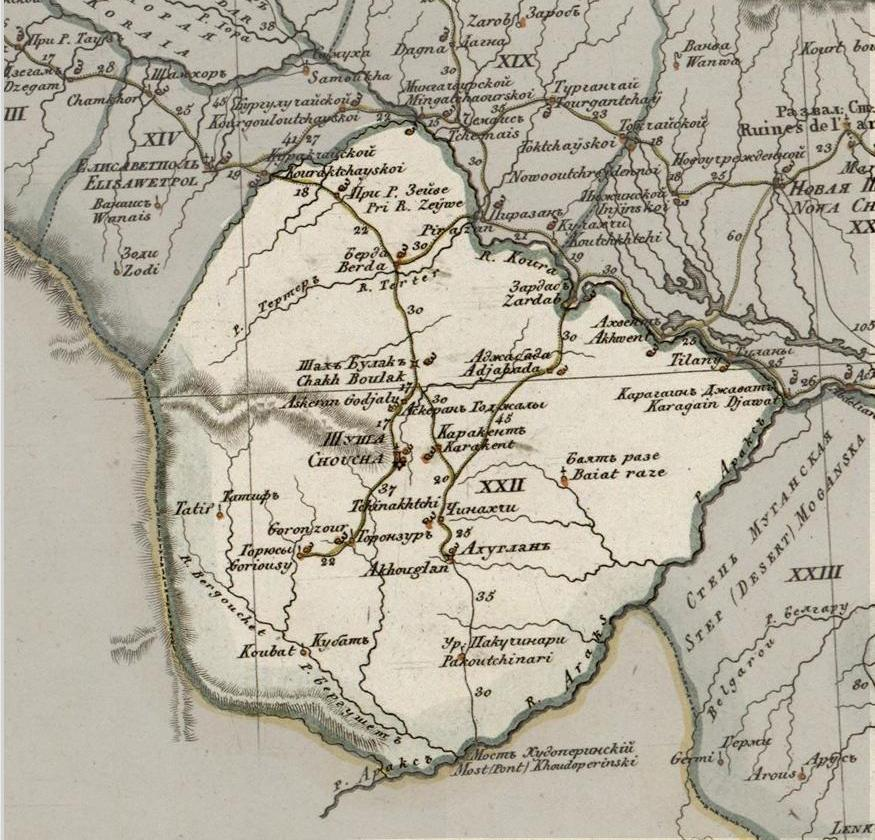
Karabakh Khanate on a map of 1823

The Jevanshir uezd (Note: Russian: Джеванши́рскій уѣ́здъ, romanized: Dzhevanshírsky uyézd; Azerbaijani: جوانشیر قضاسی, romanized: Cavānşīr qaz̤āsı, or جوان شیر قضاسی, Cavān Şīr qaz̤āsı; Armenian: Ջևանշիրի գավառ, romanized: J̌ewanširi gavaṙ) was a county (uezd) of the Elizavetpol Governorate of the Russian Empire, with its center in Terter (present-day Tartar).

== Geography ==
The Jevanshir uezd was made up of two parts, the northeastern lowland and the southwestern mountainous part of Jraberd. The area covered 4,818.4 square verst. The lower part, Arran, was hot and dry during summers which made the inhabitants move to mountainous areas for the duration of season. The winters were mild and short. The middle part of the county is located on the hills and is enriched with forests. The southern part is located high in the mountains. The highest peaks in mountainous ranges stretching from Lake Sevan are Murovdag (11,219 ft), Gozeldere-bashi (11,606 ft) and Ginal-dag (11,057 ft). A big part of Jevanshir uezd is within the Tartarchay basin, which starts high in the mountains near the border with the Nor Bayazet and Zangezur uezds and flows through the county discharging into Kura. The importance of the river possessed certain importance due to its wide usage in irrigations through the Jevanshir, Elizavetpol, and Shusha uezds.

The administrative center of the uezd was the town Terter, located on the Yelisavetpol (Ganja)-Shusha road, about 681.6 versts from the provincial capital.

== History ==
The territory of Jevanshir and Jebrail uezds was a part of Karabakh Khanate. In 1869, it was created out of a northern part of Shusha uezd.

After the dissolution of the Russian Empire and the formation of the independent Transcaucasian republics, including the Azerbaijan Democratic Republic in 1918, the western mountainous districts of the Elizavetpol Governorate including the Shusha, Zangezur, Jebrail, Jevanshir, Kazakh and Elizavetpol uezds became subject to intense territorial disputes between Armenia and Azerbaijan throughout 1918–1920, both of whom included these areas in their territorial pretensions that they presented in memorandums to the Paris Peace Conference.

Since the collapse of Russian authority in the Transcaucasus, the mountainous portion of the uezd, which was overwhelmingly Armenian, was governed by the de facto Karabakh Council which vehemently rejected Ottoman and Azerbaijani attempts to subordinate the region. However, following the arrival of British forces in Transcaucasia, the Karabakh Council reluctantly submitted to provisional Azerbaijani rule through the Governor-Generalship of Karabakh, led by Dr. Khosrov bey Sultanov, due to the exerted British pressure on the council in August 1919.

Following the establishment of Soviet rule in Azerbaijan, the county was partitioned into several rayons, with the overwhelmingly Armenian subsections forming part of the Nagorno-Karabakh Autonomous Oblast.

== Administrative divisions ==
The subcounties (uchastoks) of the Jevanshir uezd in 1912 were as follows:

Name	1912 population	Area
1-y uchastok (1-й участокъ)	28,879	744.71 square versts (847.53 km^{2}; 327.23 mi^{2})
2-y uchastok (2-й участокъ)	17,702	713.01 square versts (811.45 km^{2}; 313.30 mi^{2})
3-y uchastok (3-й участокъ)	30,217	3,196.34 square versts (3,637.63 km^{2}; 1,404.50 mi^{2})

== Economy ==
The county had 213 settlements and its population was engaged primarily in agriculture and cattlebreeding with the population in lowland part of uezd engaged in sericulture and gardening. The mountainous parts above wooden mountains were used as mountain pastures, the lower regions of the highland were cultivated for growing barley and wheat. The lowland area was used for growing cotton, rice and other various plants. The agricultural data from 1891 states the cattle stock numbered 52,800 while small cattle numbered 112,000. There were 34 factories with a total production output accounting to 37,914 rubles.

== Demographics ==
=== Russian Empire Census ===
According to the Russian Empire Census, the Jevanshir uezd had a population of 72,719 on 28 January [O.S. 15 January] 1897, including 41,039 men and 31,680 women. The plurality of the population indicated Tatar (Note: Before 1918, Azerbaijanis were generally known as "Tatars". This term, employed by the Russians, referred to Turkic-speaking Muslims of the South Caucasus. After 1918, with the establishment of the Azerbaijan Democratic Republic and "especially during the Soviet era", the Tatar group identified itself as "Azerbaijani".) to be their mother tongue, with a significant Armenian speaking minority.

Linguistic composition of the Jevanshir uezd in 1897
Language	Native speakers	%
Tatar	52,041	71.56
Armenian	19,551	26.89
Kurdish	571	0.79
Russian	206	0.28
Persian	143	0.20
Kyurin	79	0.11
Georgian	47	0.06
Greek	46	0.06
Polish	9	0.01
German	5	0.01
Avar-Andean	5	0.01
Kazi-Kumukh	5	0.01
Ukrainian	2	0.00
Other	9	0.01
TOTAL	72,719	100.00

=== Kavkazskiy kalendar ===
According to the 1917 publication of Kavkazskiy kalendar, the Jevanshir uezd had a population of 75,730 on 14 January [O.S. 1 January] 1916, including 41,496 men and 34,234 women, 69,467 of whom were the permanent population, and 6,263 were temporary residents. The statistics indicated Shia Muslims were the majority of the population of the district with significant Armenian and Sunni Muslim minorities:

Nationality	Number	%
Shia Muslims (Note: Primarily Tatars.)	42,766	56.47
Armenians	22,008	29.06
Sunni Muslims (Note: Primarily Turco-Tatars.)	8,032	10.61
North Caucasians	2,204	2.91
Russians	715	0.94
Other Europeans	3	0.00
Jews	2	0.00
TOTAL	75,730	100.00

== Bibliography ==
- Bournoutian, George A. (2018). Armenia and Imperial Decline: The Yerevan Province, 1900–1914. Milton Park, Abingdon, Oxon: Routledge. ISBN 978-1-351-06260-2. OCLC 1037283914.
- Hovannisian, Richard G. (1971). The Republic of Armenia. Vol. 1: The First Year, 1918–1919. Berkeley: University of California Press. ISBN 978-0520019843.
- Кавказский календарь на 1913 год [Caucasian calendar for 1913] (in Russian) (68th ed.). Tiflis: Tipografiya kantselyarii Ye.I.V. na Kavkaze, kazenny dom. 1913. Archived from the original on 19 April 2022.
- Кавказский календарь на 1917 год [Caucasian calendar for 1917] (in Russian) (72nd ed.). Tiflis: Tipografiya kantselyarii Ye.I.V. na Kavkaze, kazenny dom. 1917. Archived from the original on 4 November 2021.
- Tsutsiev, Arthur (2014). Atlas of the Ethno-Political History of the Caucasus (PDF). Translated by Nora Seligman Favorov. New Haven: Yale University Press. ISBN 9780300153088. Archived (PDF) from the original on 17 June 2023.
