= Agdash, Azerbaijan =

Capital city of Agdash District, central Azerbaijan

Agdash Ağdaş
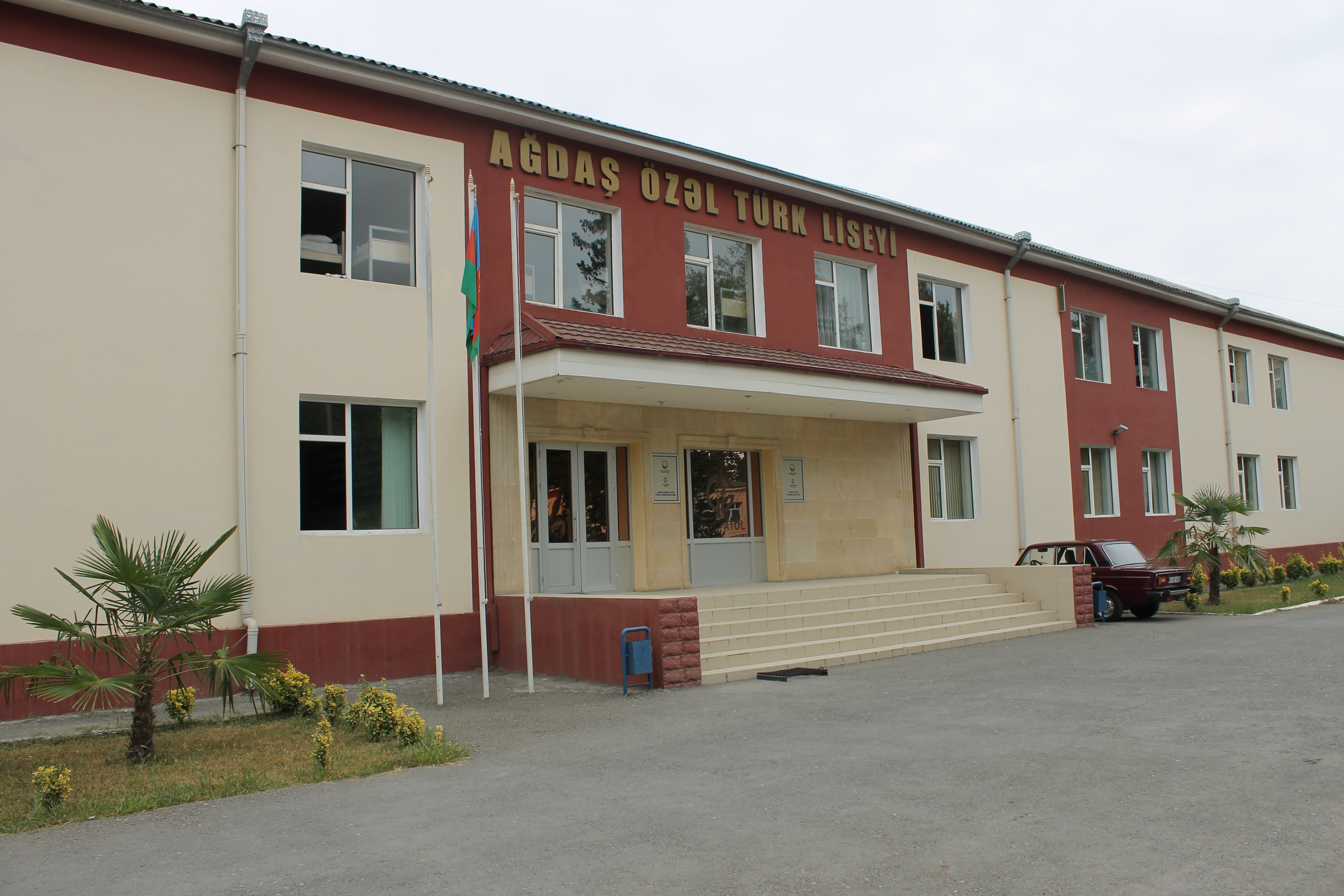
- Agdash Private Turkish College

- Location within Azerbaijan
- Coordinates: 40°39′00″N 47°28′34″E
- Country: Azerbaijan
- District: Agdash
- City status: 1900
- Elevation: 40 m (130 ft)

Population (2010)
  - Total: 25,345
- Time zone: UTC+4 (AZT)
- Postal code: AZ 03000
- Area code: +994 193
- Vehicle registration: 03

Agdash (Azerbaijani: Ağdaş), known as Arash (Ərəş) until 1919, is a city in and the capital of the Agdash District of Azerbaijan. Agdash suffered considerable damage during the June 4, 1999 earthquake but has since been thoroughly repaired.

== History ==
At the beginning of the 19th century, Uchgovag, a small village, in the Agdash district of the Shaki Khanate, was later called Agdash.

In 1819, Shaki province was established in place of the Shaki Khanate. Later, in accordance with the "Administrative reform law in the Transcaucasia" dated April 22(10), 1840, the province of Sheki was part of Kaspi Province, and after that, it was called “Shakinsky Uyezd” (administrative units). After the abolishment of Kaspi Province in 1846, Shakinsky Uyezd remained in the Shamakhi governorate (since 1859, it was called the Baku province) which was previously established in the Kaspi Province. However, at the end of 1867, Shakinsky Uyezd was removed from the Baku province and joined the newly established Yelizavetpol Province. At that time, Shakinsky Uyezd was officially called Nukha Uyezd in accordance with the name of the administrative centre. In 1873, a part of the territory of the Nukha Uyezd was separated into another uezd ("county") known as the Aresh uezd of the Elizavetpol Governorate.

== Cotton-growing ==
In 1887, the head of the Lodz Kontory, Ramendik came to Agdash and opened cotton fields, set up 4 cotton-machine tools made in China and a press for the initial processing and packaging of cotton. There were seven factories, consisting of cotton- Chinese machines in Agdash, in 1897. 3,100 poods of cotton were sold in the Agdash market In 1888, and in 1892 this number reached 28,000 poods.

At the end of the 19th century, Agdash became the centre of cotton production, processing and sale in the whole Caucasus. Therefore, the first congress of Caucasian cotton growers was held in Agdash in 1904.

== Education ==
One of the first educational institutions opened in Azerbaijan was the Russian-Tatar school founded by educator Suleyman Gayibov in Agdash on October 25, 1882. It is not accidental that one of the three schools in Azerbaijan at that time was opened in Agdash. Because before that, there were up to 20 madrasahs in Agdash until that time which gave education to people.

The status of the city was given to Agdash village, in 1900. At the beginning of the 20th century, educational institutions operated in Agdash such as the "Nəşri-Maarif" society, reading-room, "Saadat" girls' school, "Darulirfan" and "Rushdiye". Educators such as Mukhtar Afandizade, Donat Mammadzadeh, Hasan Efendiyev worked in these institutions.
