= Kazakh uezd =

Coordinates: 41°05′36″N 45°21′58″E

Kazakh uezd Казахскій уѣздъ
- Uezd
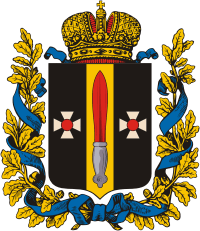
- Coat of arms

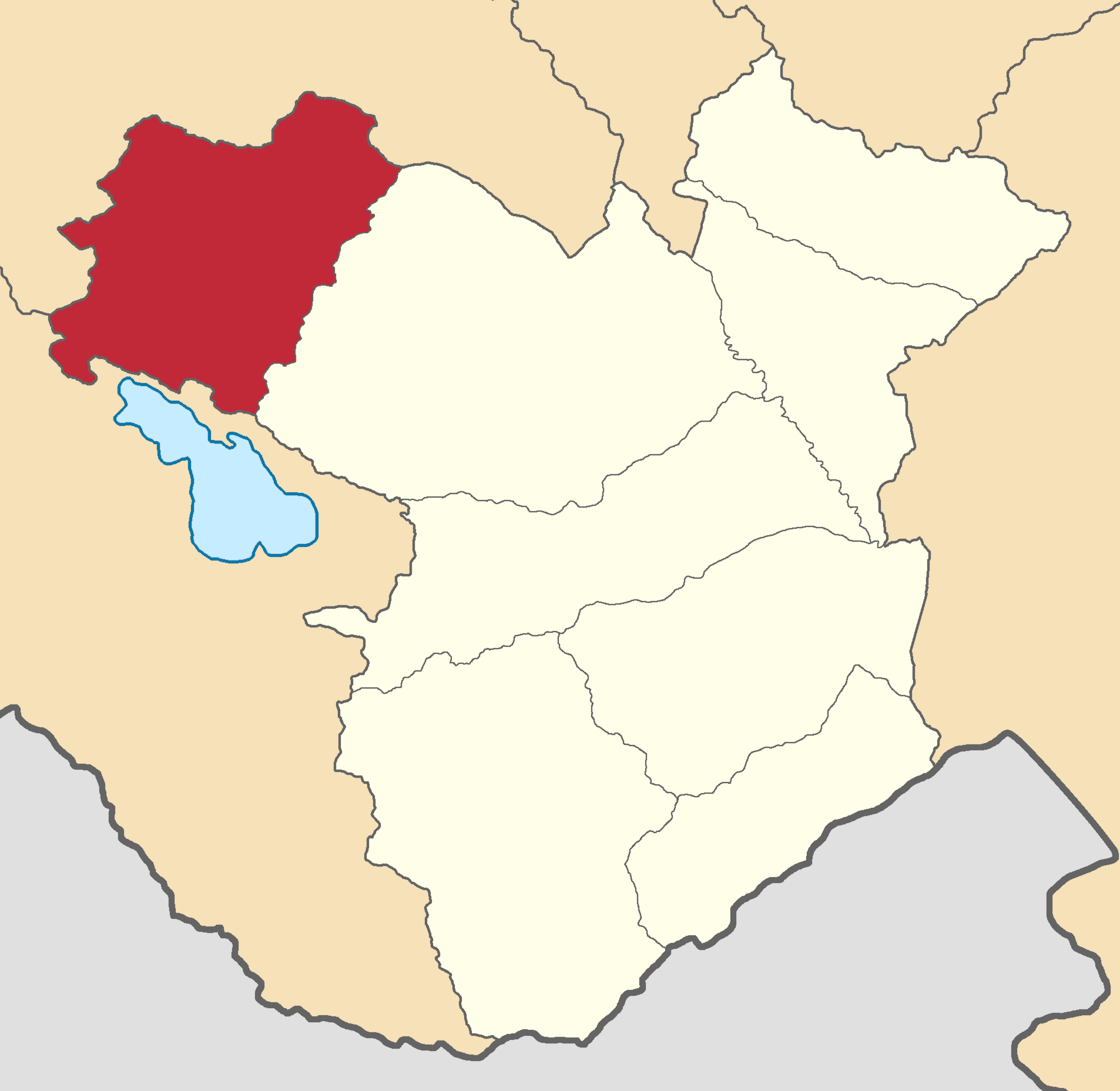
- Location in the Elizavetpol Governorate
- Country: Russian Empire
- Viceroyalty: Caucasus
- Governorate: Elizavetpol
- Established: 1868
- Abolished: 1929
- Capital: Kazakh (present day Qazax)

Area
  - Total: 5,800.16 km^{2} (2,239.45 sq mi)

Population (1916)
  - Total: 137,049
  - Density: 23.6285/km^{2} (61.1975/sq mi)
  - Rural: 100.00%

The Kazakh uezd (Note: Russian: Каза́хскій уѣ́здъ, romanized: Kazákhsky uyézd; Armenian: Ղազախի գավառ, romanized: Ġazaxi gavaṙ; Azerbaijani: ﻗﺎﺯﺍﺥ ﻗﻀﺎﺳﻰ, romanized: Qāzāx qaz̤āsı) was a county (uezd) of the Elizavetpol Governorate of the Russian Empire and later of the Azerbaijan Democratic Republic with its center in Kazakh (present-day Qazax) from 1868 until its formal abolition in 1929 by the Soviet authorities of the Azerbaijan SSR. The area of the Kazakh uezd forms a large part of the modern-day Tavush Province and a small northeastern part of the Gegharkunik Province of Armenia, also forming most of the area of the Agstafa, Tovuz and Qazax districts of Azerbaijan.

== Geography ==
The Kazakh uezd was located in the northwestern part of Elizavetpol Governorate, bordering the Tiflis Governorate in the north, the Erivan Governorates in the southwest, and the Elizavetpol uezd in the east. The area of the county was 6024.2 square versts. The southwestern part of the county was mountainous, whereas the northeastern part mainly consisted of lowlands. Two-thirds of county was covered by the Sevan or Shahdagh mountain range of Lesser Caucasus which formed the natural boundary between the Erivan and Elizavetpol Governorates, extending from the southwest towards the northeast, then meeting the Kura River in the lowlands. Among its peaks are Soyuq-bulag (Azerbaijani: Soyuğ bulağ, 8,806 ft), Shah-dagh (Azerbaijani: Şah dağ, 9556 ft), Murguz (Azerbaijani: Murğuz, 9852 ft).

== History ==
The Kazakh sultanate existed in the area of the county from the 15th century until its incorporation into Russian Empire along with Georgian territories. Kazakh at the time being a part of the Georgian Governorate until the establishment of Elizavetpol Governorate in 1868. The county was one of the first locations of revolt against the decaying Russian authority, erupting in the beginning of 1918.

After the dissolution of the Russian Empire and the formation of the independent Transcaucasian republics, including the Azerbaijan Democratic Republic in 1918, the western mountainous districts of the Elizavetpol Governorate including the Shusha, Zangezur, Jebrail, Jevanshir, Kazakh and Elizavetpol uezds became subject to intense territorial disputes between Armenia and Azerbaijan throughout 1918-1920, both of whom included these areas in their territorial pretensions that they presented in memorandums to the Paris Peace Conference.

Since the collapse of Russian authority in the Transcaucasus, the southwestern mountainous portion of the county including the town of Dilijan which possessed an overwhelmingly Armenian population was incorporated into the Republic of Armenia in the December of 1918, following the withdrawal of the occupying Ottoman forces. The region later became the site of occasional clashes during the Armenian-Azerbaijani war, with the Azerbaijani Army mainly concentrated in the northeastern lowlands including the district center Kazakh, and the Armenian Army in the adjacent highlands.

Following the Sovietization of the Transcausus, the Caucasian Bureau of the Central Committee of the Russian Communist Party was tasked with resolving the issue of boundaries between the new Armenian and Azerbaijani Soviet Republics, leading to the demarcation line of 1918-1920 being largely preserved with most of the highlands of the Kazakh uezd remaining within Soviet Armenia, and the rest of the county remaining to Soviet Azerbaijan. This arrangement persisted until the Kazakh uezd was formally abolished in 1929 by Soviet authorities, leading to the formation of the Qazakh Rayon on August 8, 1930 in its place.

Kazakh, also known as New Akstafa, was an important railway station linking the Elizavetpol Governorate (Soyug Bulag station) with Erivan, Tiflis and Kars (Dzegam station) via the Transcaucasus Railway.

== Administrative divisions ==
The subcounties (uchastoks) of the Kazakh uezd in 1912 were as follows:

Name	1912 population	Area
1-y uchastok (1-й участок)	25,449	909.79 square versts (1,035.40 km^{2}; 399.77 mi^{2})
2-y uchastok (2-й участок)	20,880	857.34 square versts (975.71 km^{2}; 376.72 mi^{2})
3-y uchastok (3-й участок)	38,056	1,160.28 square versts (1,320.47 km^{2}; 509.84 mi^{2})
4-y uchastok (4-й участок)	41,089	2,169.11 square versts (2,468.58 km^{2}; 953.12 mi^{2})

== Economy ==
The county ranked first in Elizavetpol Governorate for the number of its male population. The population was engaged primarily in agricultural farming, gardening, and tobacco growing. Wool production played an important role in the economy of uezd. Kazakh uezd had the lowest number of plants and factories in the governorate. According to statistical data from 1891, there were 10,590 horses, 2,700 donkeys and mules, 77,826 great cattle, 8,107 buffalos, 251,000 sheep, 14,100 goats, 10,468 pigs.

== Demographics ==
=== Russian Empire Census ===
According to the Russian Empire Census, the Kazakh uezd had a population of 112,074 on 28 January [O.S. 15 January] 1897, including 63,370 men and 48,704 women. The majority of the population indicated Tatar (Note: Before 1918, Azerbaijanis were generally known as "Tatars". This term, employed by the Russians, referred to Turkic-speaking Muslims of the South Caucasus. After 1918, with the establishment of the Azerbaijan Democratic Republic and "especially during the Soviet era", the Tatar group identified itself as "Azerbaijani".) to be their mother tongue, with significant Armenian and Russian speaking minorities.

Linguistic composition of the Kazakh uezd in 1897
Language	Native speakers	%
Tatar	64,101	57.20
Armenian	43,555	38.86
Russian	3,373	3.01
Georgian	425	0.38
Greek	178	0.16
Kurdish	137	0.12
Polish	70	0.06
Ukrainian	65	0.06
German	43	0.04
Persian	34	0.03
Jewish	11	0.01
Avar-Andean	9	0.01
Romanian	7	0.01
Belarusian	6	0.01
Lithuanian	4	0.00
Kazi-Kumukh	2	0.00
Kyurin	2	0.00
Tat	1	0.00
Other	51	0.05
TOTAL	112,074	100.00

=== Kavkazskiy kalendar ===
According to the 1917 publication of Kavkazskiy kalendar, the Kazakh uezd had a population of 137,049 on 14 January [O.S. 1 January] 1916, including 78,601 men and 58,448 women, 131,032 of whom were the permanent population, and 6,017 were temporary residents:

Nationality	Number	%
Armenians	61,597	44.95
Shia Muslims (Note: Primarily Tatars.)	46,239	33.74
Sunni Muslims (Note: Primarily Turco-Tatars.)	21,711	15.84
Russians	6,178	4.51
Other Europeans	779	0.57
Georgians	279	0.20
North Caucasians	231	0.17
Kurds	35	0.03
TOTAL	137,049	100.00

=== Soviet census (1926) ===
According to the Soviet census of 1926, the population rose to 121,255 people of which 110,550 were Turks (i.e. Azerbaijanis), 3,632 - Armenians, 3,816 - Russians, 1,543 - Germans. The decline in Armenians can be attributed to the separation of the predominantly-Armenian Dilijan uezd from the territory of Kazakh uezd in 1921.

== Bibliography ==
- Bournoutian, George A. (2018). Armenia and Imperial Decline: The Yerevan Province, 1900–1914. Milton Park, Abingdon, Oxon: Routledge. ISBN 978-1-351-06260-2. OCLC 1037283914.
- Hovannisian, Richard G. (1971). The Republic of Armenia. Vol. 1: The First Year, 1918–1919. Berkeley: University of California Press. ISBN 978-0520019843.
- Кавказский календарь на 1913 год [Caucasian calendar for 1913] (in Russian) (68th ed.). Tiflis: Tipografiya kantselyarii Ye.I.V. na Kavkaze, kazenny dom. 1913. Archived from the original on 19 April 2022.
- Кавказский календарь на 1917 год [Caucasian calendar for 1917] (in Russian) (72nd ed.). Tiflis: Tipografiya kantselyarii Ye.I.V. na Kavkaze, kazenny dom. 1917. Archived from the original on 4 November 2021.
- Tsutsiev, Arthur (2014). Atlas of the Ethno-Political History of the Caucasus (PDF). Translated by Nora Seligman Favorov. New Haven: Yale University Press. ISBN 9780300153088. Archived (PDF) from the original on 17 June 2023.
