= Elizavetpol uezd =

Coordinates: 40°40′58″N 46°21′38″E

Elizavetpol uezd Елисаветпольскій уѣздъ
- Uezd
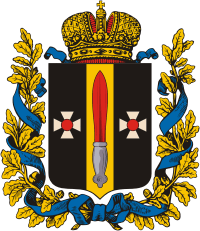
- Coat of arms

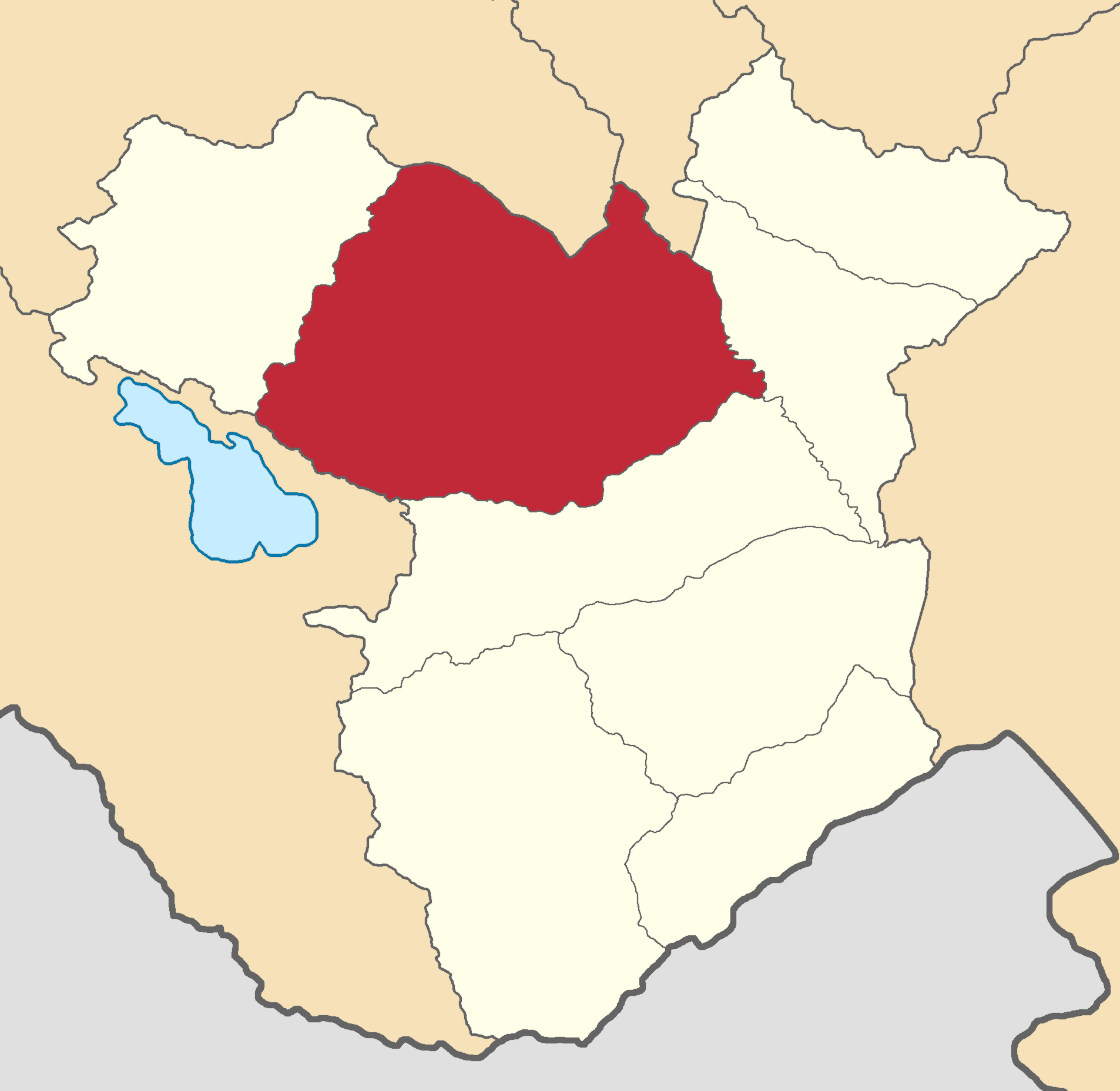
- Location in the Elizavetpol Governorate
- Country: Russian Empire
- Viceroyalty: Caucasus
- Governorate: Elizavetpol
- Established: 1840
- Abolished: 1929
- Capital: Yelisavetpol (present-day Ganja)

Area
  - Total: 9,930.73 km^{2} (3,834.28 sq mi)

Population (1916)
  - Total: 272,477
  - Density: 27.4378/km^{2} (71.0635/sq mi)
  - Urban: 21.19%
  - Rural: 78.81%

The Elizavetpol uezd, (Note: Russian: Елисаветпо́льскій уѣ́здъ, romanized: Yelisavetpólsky uyézd; Azerbaijani: الیساوتوپل قضاسی, romanized: Elīsāvetopol qaz̤āsı; Armenian: Ելիզավետպոլի գավառ, romanized: Elizavetpoli gavaṙ) also known as the Ganja uezd (Note: Russian: Ганджи́нский уе́зд, romanized: Gandzhínsky uyézd; Azerbaijani: گنجه قضاسی, romanized: Ganca qaz̤āsı; Armenian: Գանձակի գավառ, romanized: Ganjaki gavaṙ) after 1918, was a county (uezd) of the Elizavetpol Governorate of the Russian Empire, and later of the Azerbaijan Democratic Republic and Azerbaijan SSR until its formal abolition in 1929. The area of the Elizavetpol uezd corresponds to the modern-day Gadabay, Shamkir, Dashkasan, Goygol, and Samukh districts of Azerbaijan.

== Geography ==
The Elizavetpol uezd was located in the northern part of Elizavetpol Governorate, bordering the Tiflis Governorate to the north, the Kazakh uezd to the west, the Aresh uezd to the east and Jevanshir uezd to the south. The administrative center of the uezd was the city of Yelisavetpol (Ganja).

The area of the county was 8,726 square verst and was divided into two parts: the northeastern lowlands steppes, irrigated by Kura River and its tributaries and southwestern mountainous part, watered by Kura's right bank tributaries. The lowland part was split by the Kura and Alazani rivers, the latter of which is not forested, less fertile and rarely used for farming. The mountainous part of the county stretched up to the mountain range adjacent to Lake Sevan. The highest peaks of uezd included Murovdag, (Azerbaijani: Murovdağ; 11,219 ft), Ginal-dag (Azerbaijani: Ginaldağ; 11,057 ft), Gyamysh (Azerbaijani: Gəmış; 12,263 ft), bordered Javanshir uezd of Elizavetpol Governorate and Novobayazet uezd of Erivan Governorate. The main rivers flowing down from these mountains into the lowland part of uezd and discharging into Kura were Kuruk-chay, Ganja-chay, Qoshqara-chay, Shamkhor-chay.

== History ==
After establishment of Russian rule over the khanates of the South Caucasus and the implementation of administrative reforms, the territories of Ganja khanate were incorporated into the Tiflis Governorate of the Russian Empire. On 10 April 1840, the Elizavetpol uezd was established within Georgian-Imereti Governorate, and on 14 December 1846 it was incorporated into the newly created Tiflis Governorate. In 1868, the uezd was reestablished within the newly founded Elizavetpol Governorate with its capital in Elizavetpol (present-day Ganja).

After establishment of the Azerbaijan Democratic Republic in 1918, the uezd was renamed to the Ganja uezd, then named back to the Elizavetpol uezd and then again to the Ganja uezd on 10 August 1918. On 22 April 1920, a part of Ganja uezd was established as the Shamkhor uezd within Azerbaijan.

With the Red Army invasion of Azerbaijan and subsequent establishment of Soviet rule, the uezd was abolished on 8 April 1929 following an administrative reorganisation of the region.

== Administrative divisions ==
The subcounties (uchastoks) of the Elizavetpol uezd in 1912 were as follows:

Name	1912 population	Area
1-y uchastok (1-й участокъ)	29,547	1,515 square versts (1,724 km^{2}; 666 mi^{2})
2-y uchastok (2-й участокъ)	27,847	1,948 square versts (2,217 km^{2}; 856 mi^{2})
3-y uchastok (3-й участокъ)	26,880	1,298 square versts (1,477 km^{2}; 570 mi^{2})
4-y uchastok (4-й участокъ)	35,816	2,191 square versts (2,493 km^{2}; 963 mi^{2})
5-y uchastok (5-й участокъ)	21,166	1,111 square versts (1,264 km^{2}; 488 mi^{2})
6-y uchastok (6-й участокъ)	5,134	461 square versts (525 km^{2}; 203 mi^{2})

== Economy ==
The population of the county was engaged primarily in agricultural farming, gardening, winemaking, corn and rice growing. Wine production in Azerbaijan was mostly seen in the city of Elizavetpol and German-populated town of Helenendorf where 450,000 canisters of wine were produced annually. In 1890, there were 107 factories and plants with a total number of workers at 2,136. There were two copper plants which produced 84% of the copper in Caucasus.

== Demographics ==
=== Russian Empire Census ===
According to the Russian Empire Census, the Elizavetpol uezd had a population of 162,788 on 28 January [O.S. 15 January] 1897, including 90,584 men and 72,204 women. The majority of the population indicated Tatar (Note: Before 1918, Azerbaijanis were generally known as "Tatars". This term, employed by the Russians, referred to Turkic-speaking Muslims of the South Caucasus. After 1918, with the establishment of the Azerbaijan Democratic Republic and "especially during the Soviet era", the Tatar group identified itself as "Azerbaijani".) to be their mother tongue, with significant Armenian and Russian speaking minorities.

Linguistic composition of the Elizavetpol uezd in 1897
Language	Native speakers	%
Tatar	103,970	63.87
Armenian	43,040	26.44
Russian	7,224	4.44
German	3,086	1.90
Belarusian	2,835	1.74
Georgian	622	0.38
Ukrainian	369	0.23
Polish	299	0.18
Avar-Andean	296	0.18
Kazi-Kumukh	207	0.13
Greek	178	0.11
Jewish	101	0.06
Persian	79	0.05
Kyurin	39	0.02
Lithuanian	38	0.02
Kurdish	38	0.02
Udi	4	0.00
Romanian	2	0.00
Other	361	0.22
TOTAL	162,788	100.00

=== Kavkazskiy kalendar ===
According to the 1917 publication of Kavkazskiy kalendar, the Elizavetpol uezd had a population of 272,477 on 14 January [O.S. 1 January] 1916, including 140,113 men and 132,364 women, 239,688 of whom were the permanent population, and 32,789 were temporary residents. The statistics indicated Shia Muslims to be the plurality of the population of the district, with significant Armenian, Sunni Muslim, and Russian minorities:

Nationality	Urban		Rural		TOTAL	
Nationality	Number	%	Number	%	Number	%
Shia Muslims (Note: Primarily Tatars.)	37,619	65.16	88,012	40.98	125,631	46.11
Armenians	12,125	21.00	56,589	26.35	68,714	25.22
Sunni Muslims (Note: Primarily Turco-Tatars.)	539	0.93	51,185	23.84	51,724	18.98
Russians	6,091	10.55	12,353	5.75	18,444	6.77
Other Europeans	319	0.55	6,093	2.84	6,412	2.35
Georgians	303	0.52	154	0.07	457	0.17
North Caucasians	202	0.35	250	0.12	452	0.17
Jews	391	0.68	7	0.00	398	0.15
Asiatic Christians	58	0.10	101	0.05	159	0.06
Kurds	84	0.15	0	0.00	84	0.03
Roma	0	0.00	2	0.00	2	0.00
TOTAL	57,731	100.00	214,746	100.00	272,477	100.00

== Bibliography ==
- Bournoutian, George A. (2018). Armenia and Imperial Decline: The Yerevan Province, 1900–1914. Milton Park, Abingdon, Oxon: Routledge. ISBN 978-1-351-06260-2. OCLC 1037283914.
- Hovannisian, Richard G. (1971). The Republic of Armenia. Vol. 1: The First Year, 1918–1919. Berkeley: University of California Press. ISBN 978-0520019843.
- Кавказский календарь на 1913 год [Caucasian calendar for 1913] (in Russian) (68th ed.). Tiflis: Tipografiya kantselyarii Ye.I.V. na Kavkaze, kazenny dom. 1913. Archived from the original on 19 April 2022.
- Кавказский календарь на 1917 год [Caucasian calendar for 1917] (in Russian) (72nd ed.). Tiflis: Tipografiya kantselyarii Ye.I.V. na Kavkaze, kazenny dom. 1917. Archived from the original on 4 November 2021.
- Tsutsiev, Arthur (2014). Atlas of the Ethno-Political History of the Caucasus (PDF). Translated by Nora Seligman Favorov. New Haven: Yale University Press. ISBN 9780300153088. Archived (PDF) from the original on 17 June 2023.
