= Zangezur uezd =

Coordinates: 39°30′28″N 46°20′19″E

Zangezur uezd Зангезурскій уѣздъ
- Uezd
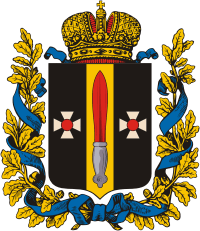
- Coat of arms

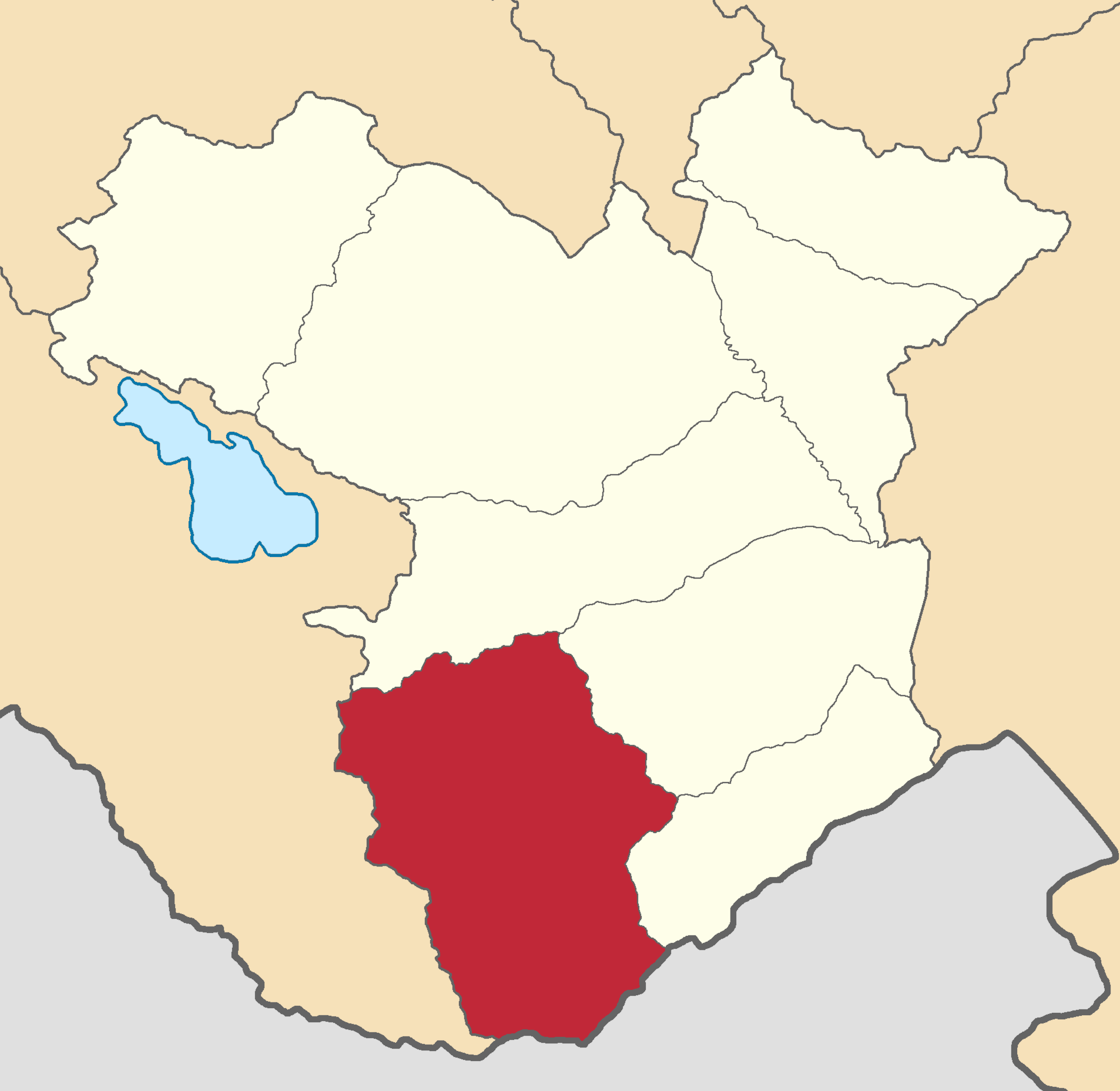
- Location in the Elizavetpol Governorate
- Country: Russian Empire
- Viceroyalty: Caucasus
- Governorate: Elizavetpol
- Established: 1868
- Abolished: 1921
- Capital: Gerusy (present-day Goris)

Area
  - Total: 7,673.86 km^{2} (2,962.89 sq mi)

Population (1916)
  - Total: 226,398
  - Density: 29.5025/km^{2} (76.4111/sq mi)
  - Urban: 0.97%
  - Rural: 99.03%

The Zangezur uezd (Note: Russian: Зангезу́рскій уѣ́здъ, romanized: Zangezúrsky uyézd; Armenian: Զանգեզուրի գավառ, romanized: Zangezowri gavaṙ; Azerbaijani: زنگزور قضاسی, romanized: Zangazūr qaz̤āsı) was a county (uezd) of the Elizavetpol Governorate of the Russian Empire with its administrative center in Gerusy (present-day Goris) from 1868 until its formal abolition and partition between the Soviet republics of Armenia and Azerbaijan in 1921. The area of the Zangezur uezd corresponded to most of the contemporary Syunik province of Armenia, and Lachin, Gubadly, Zangilan, and the westernmost parts of Shusha districts of Azerbaijan.

== Geography ==
Almost the entirety of the area is mountainous with many gorges and valleys of the Lesser Caucasus mountain range. The altitude ranges from 10,000–12,855 feet at Mount Kaputjugh, a mountain range which forms the natural boundary between the governorates of Elizavetpol and Erivan. The rivers of the Zangezur uezd are located within the Aras River basin—The Bargushad, Chaundurchay, Basitchay, and Megrichay rivers played important roles in the irrigation system of the uezd.

== History ==
Historically, the Zangezur region was part of the Syunik province of Armenian kingdoms and polities. In 1748, Zangezur was joined to the Karabakh Khanate which stretched into the lowland steppes of Karabakh and before that, it was part of numerous Turkic states and polities. Following the Russian Empire's annexation of the region from Qajar Iran, the Karabakh Khanate was dissolved and divided into uezds—Elizavetpol, Ordubad, and Shusha. Between the 1770s and 1813, the Zangezur uezd was mostly a part of the Shemakha Governorate (later known as the Baku Governorate). With the establishment of the Elizavetpol Governorate on 25 February 1868, the Zangezur uezd was also formed.

=== 1918 ===
The 1918 independence of Armenia and Azerbaijan birthed an era of ethnic-conflict that spread over the highland districts of the Elizavetpol Governorate, including Zangezur. Thus, both states included these lands in memorandums of their claimed national borders to the Paris Peace Conference. In the central subdistricts (Goris, Kapan, Meghri, and Sisian), Armenians formed the majority of the population, whereas Tatars (Note: Before 1918, Azerbaijanis were generally known as "Tatars". This term, employed by the Russians, referred to Turkic-speaking Muslims of the South Caucasus. After 1918, with the establishment of the Azerbaijan Democratic Republic and "especially during the Soviet era", the Tatar group identified itself as "Azerbaijani".) and Kurds were mainly concentrated in the "peripheral southeastern slopes". Without the predominantly Muslim-inhabited southeastern slopes, Zangezur consisted of 88,000 Armenians, 2,000 other Christians, and 46,000 Muslims.

It was with this ethnography that it was possible for fedayi Andranik Ozanian to establish control over the west of the uezd (modern-day Syunik). In addition to 30–40 thousand refugees from the Mush and Baghesh (present-day Muş and Bitlis, respectively) regions of Turkey, Andranik also brought with him 3–5 or 12 thousand fighters. By early 1918, Andranik had overseen the destruction of 18 Muslim villages in Zangezur and killed 500 women. As a result of his activities of "transforming Zangezur into a solidly Armenian land", over 100 Muslim villages were devastated, 10,000 Muslims were killed, and 40,000 were displaced to the Jebrail and Jevanshir uezds. As these clashes occurred at the height of Ottoman dominance in the South Caucasus, General Halil Bey threatened the Armenian government, however, the latter claimed they had no control over Andranik. The Armenian government's reply referenced the declaration of Nuri Pasha that the whole Elizavetpol Governorate belonged to Azerbaijan and that accordingly, Armenian military units were restricted from Zangezur.

As a result of Andranik's successes in maintaining control of Zangezur, the Armenians of Nagorno-Karabakh appealed for protection from Azerbaijani–Turkish intrusion, leading to him concentrating his forces along the eastern boundary of Zangezur in late October in preparation to march into Karabakh. The advance was delayed until 29 November as Andranik waited to obtain "written guarantees of support" from Nagorno-Karabakh's leaders. 20 Muslim villages were on the road between Armenian-controlled Zangezur and Shusha, the capital of Karabakh, Avdallar (present-day Lachin) and Zabukh the most important of these. The battle for Avdallar and its surrounds raged for 3 days, eventually resulting in the defeat of the local Tatars and Kurds led by Sultan bey Sultanov. By this time however, the British had supplanted the Ottoman forces in the South Caucasus by virtue of the Mudros Armistice, therefore, Andranik was stopped from proceeding to Nagorno-Karabakh by Major-General William M. Thomson. As Andranik's forces on 4 December withdrew to Goris, the last 3 Armenian villages between Zangezur and Nagorno-Karabakh were destroyed.

=== 1919 ===
On 22 March 1919, Andranik left Zangezur through Daralayaz (modern-day Vayots Dzor). In April 1919, the British command in Baku by appointing Khosrov bey Sultanov the Governor-General of Karabakh and Zangezur provisionally recognised the region as part of Azerbaijan pending the decision of the Paris Peace Conference. Shortly after, the British pressured the Armenians of Zangezur to recognise Azerbaijani authority, eventually leading to General Digby Shuttleworth in late April unsuccessfully threatening the Armenians with force. On the other hand, Nagorno-Karabakh was successfully subjugated to Azerbaijani authority on 22 August 1919, owing to Azerbaijani threats of massacre as demonstrated by the Khaibalikend massacre. Without Andranik's forces, Zangezur demanded support from Armenia to protect itself from Azerbaijan. The Armenian government answered their request by dispatching Colonel Arsen Shahmazyan with the instructions to secretly incorporate the region into the Republic of Armenia. Eventually, the Armenian defiance in Zangezur led to the British command permitting Zangezur to remain within Armenian jurisdiction, contrary to their initial stance—in what Major General G.N. Cory described as a "major concession".

The destruction of Muslim settlements in Zangezur and the Armenian restriction on 10,000 Muslim shepherds taking 150,000 of their livestock into the highlands served as the casus belli for Azerbaijan to prepare to take over the district. Following the British withdrawal from the South Caucasus, the Azerbaijani army and Kurdish local forces led by Sultan bey Sultanov and some Turkish officers launched a full-scale invasion into Zangezur on 4 November, confident in their ability owing to their victories over the Mughan Soviet Republic and subjugating the Karabakh Council. Despite meeting success on all fronts and routing the local Armenians, the Azerbaijanis suffered heavy casualties and withdrew on 7 November. With combined British and American pressure, on 23 November in Tiflis (present-day Tbilisi) prime ministers Alexander Khatisian and Nasib bey Yusifbeyli signed a peace agreement and ineffectually committed to revolve their territorial disputes exclusively by peaceful means. Despite the signing of the peace agreement, fighting continued: Halil Bey from the direction of Nakhichevan unsuccessfully attacked Keshishkend (present-day Yeghegnadzor) in Daralayaz, whilst forces under Garegin Nzhdeh attacked the remaining Muslim villages in the valley between Tatev and Kapan—On 7 December 1919, the last Muslim village, Adjibadj (located near Geghi) was burned and its inhabitants fled to Nakhichevan. On 24 January 1920, British Chief Commissioner of Transcaucasia Oliver Wardrop notified Prime Minister Khatisian that he had evidence that the Armenian army was involved in attacks on 24 Muslim settlements in Zangezur. To placate Wardrop's complaints, Armenia recalled Colonel Shahmazian from Zangezur, replacing him with General H. Kazarov with instructions to investigate the Azerbaijani allegations of massacres against the Muslim population.

=== 1920 ===
As the Armenian–Azerbaijani peace talks hosted in Baku on 14–21 December 1919 did not lead to any progress on a settlement, Azerbaijan again moved its troops towards Zangezur. Furthermore, as the Paris Peace Conference was inconclusive on the issue of the Karabakh, Khosrov Bey Sultanov issued an ultimatum to the Karabakh Council to permanently accept incorporation into Azerbaijan. With the Karabakh ultimatum looming and the Azerbaijani army positioned to attack Zangezur again, the Armenian government dispatched Arsen Mikayelyan to Nagorno-Karabakh to take measures to unite the region to Armenia. The abortive uprising beginning on 23 March 1920 though resulting in the massacre and expulsion of Shusha's Armenian population was successful in ousting the Azerbaijani administration from the rest of Nagorno-Karabakh. However, as a direct result of the Sovietization of Azerbaijan, Armenian forces in late May were forced out from Nagorno-Karabakh by the 11th Army of Soviet Russia. In July 1920, a Soviet ultimatum was issued to Armenia to leave the south of Zangezur and Nakhichevan so that they could join with Turkey. Without awaiting an answer, the Red Army captured the city of Nakhichevan (present-day Nakhchivan) on 17 July, however, they were unsuccessful in seizing control of southern Zangezur due to the efforts of Nzhdeh.

After the completion of the establishment of Soviet rule in Armenia and Azerbaijan, Zangezur was initially to join Soviet Azerbaijan as it was considered practically necessary for connecting the protectorate of Nakhichevan to mainland Azerbaijan. However, Zangezur was officially "transferred" to Armenia as a "symbol of socialist friendship" in 1921, in accordance with Garegin Nzhdeh's demands to the Soviet government during the February Uprising. During the Caucasian Bureau of the Central Committee of the Russian Communist Party's arbitration of borders in July 1921, the eastern Kurdish and Azerbaijani populated areas of the Zangezur uezd were reattached to Azerbaijan, forming the Lachin, Zangilan, Gubadly districts and a small southwestern part of the Shusha District of the Nagorno-Karabakh Autonomous Oblast. In Armenia, the districts of Goris, Kapan, Meghri, and Sisian were formed in place of the abolished uezd.

== Administrative divisions ==
The subcounties (uchastoks) of the Zangezur uezd in 1912 were as follows:

Name	1912 population
1-y uchastok (1-й участокъ)	32,368
2-y uchastok (2-й участокъ)	56,585
3-y uchastok (3-й участокъ)	54,663
4-y uchastok (4-й участокъ)	39,222
5-y uchastok (5-й участокъ)	34,009

== Economy ==
There were 326 villages. The population was engaged primarily in agricultural farming, gardening, sericulture, cotton-growing, cattle-breeding and development of copper fields. The lowland area was used for growing cotton, which produced 20,000 pounds of cotton per year. Vineyards covered as much as 4,494 desyatinas of land, producing 106,860 lbs of grape. Nearly 3,728 lbs of silk pods were being collected in 1890. According to statistical data from 1891, there were 9,784 horses, 83,000 of cattle, 780 buffalos, 133,648 sheep, 4,600 goats, 7,008 donkeys and 1,505 mules in the uezd.

== Demographics ==
=== Russian Empire Census ===
According to the Russian Empire Census, the Zangezur uezd had a population of 137,871 on 28 January [O.S. 15 January] 1897, including 72,592 men and 65,279 women. The majority of the population indicated Tatar to be their mother tongue, with significant Armenian and Kurdish speaking minorities.

Linguistic composition of the Zangezur uezd in 1897
Language	Native speakers	%
Tatar	71,206	51.65
Armenian	63,622	46.15
Kurdish	1,807	1.31
Russian	841	0.61
Ukrainian	154	0.11
Greek	143	0.10
Persian	26	0.02
Polish	18	0.01
Romanian	16	0.01
Belarusian	11	0.01
German	9	0.01
Kyurin	7	0.01
Avar-Andean	3	0.00
Georgian	2	0.00
Other	6	0.00
TOTAL	137,871	100.00

=== Kavkazskiy kalendar ===
According to the 1917 publication of Kavkazskiy kalendar, the Zangezur uezd had a population of 226,398 on 14 January [O.S. 1 January] 1916, including 113,973 men and 112,425 women, 225,469 of whom were the permanent population, and 929 were temporary residents. The statistics indicate an overall Muslim majority with a Shia Muslim plurality in the district, followed closely by an Armenian minority which was the overwhelming population of the town of Gerusy:

Nationality	Urban		Rural		TOTAL	
Nationality	Number	%	Number	%	Number	%
Shia Muslims (Note: Primarily Tatars.)	202	9.18	110,514	49.29	110,716	48.90
Armenians	1,724	78.33	99,331	44.31	101,055	44.64
Sunni Muslims (Note: Primarily Turco-Tatars.)	23	1.04	8,966	4.00	8,989	3.97
Kurds	0	0.00	3,628	1.62	3,628	1.60
Russians	196	8.91	1,617	0.72	1,813	0.80
North Caucasians	22	1.00	96	0.04	118	0.05
Georgians	27	1.23	35	0.02	62	0.03
Other Europeans	6	0.27	0	0.00	6	0.00
Jews	1	0.05	0	0.00	1	0.00
TOTAL	2,201	100.00	224,197	100.00	226,398	100.00

== Bibliography ==
- Baberovski, Yorg (2010). Враг есть везде. Сталинизм на Кавказе [The enemy is everywhere. Stalinism in the Caucasus] (in Russian). Moscow: Rossiyskaya politicheskaya entsiklopediya (ROSSPEN) Fond «Prezidentskiy tsentr B. N. Yeltsina». ISBN 978-5-8243-1435-9. Archived from the original on 8 October 2022.
- Bournoutian, George A. (2018). Armenia and Imperial Decline: The Yerevan Province, 1900–1914. Milton Park, Abingdon, Oxon: Routledge. ISBN 978-1-351-06260-2. OCLC 1037283914.
- Hovannisian, Richard G. (1971). The Republic of Armenia. Vol. 1: The First Year, 1918–1919. Berkeley: University of California Press. ISBN 978-0520019843.
- Hovannisian, Richard G. (1982). The Republic of Armenia. Vol. 2: From Versailles to London, 1919–1920. Berkeley: University of California Press. ISBN 978-0520041868.
- Hovannisian, Richard G. (1996a). The Republic of Armenia. Vol. 3: From London to Sèvres, February–August 1920. Berkeley: University of California Press. ISBN 978-0520088030.
- Кавказский календарь на 1913 год [Caucasian calendar for 1913] (in Russian) (68th ed.). Tiflis: Tipografiya kantselyarii Ye.I.V. na Kavkaze, kazenny dom. 1913. Archived from the original on 19 April 2022.
- Кавказский календарь на 1917 год [Caucasian calendar for 1917] (in Russian) (72nd ed.). Tiflis: Tipografiya kantselyarii Ye.I.V. na Kavkaze, kazenny dom. 1917. Archived from the original on 4 November 2021.
- Tsutsiev, Arthur (2014). Atlas of the Ethno-Political History of the Caucasus (PDF). Translated by Nora Seligman Favorov. New Haven: Yale University Press. ISBN 9780300153088. Archived (PDF) from the original on 17 June 2023.
