= Nukha uezd =

Coordinates: 41°11′31″N 47°10′14″E

Nukha uezd Нухинскій уѣздъ
- Uezd
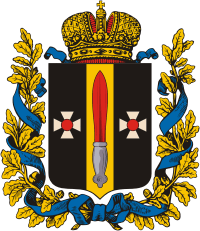
- Coat of arms

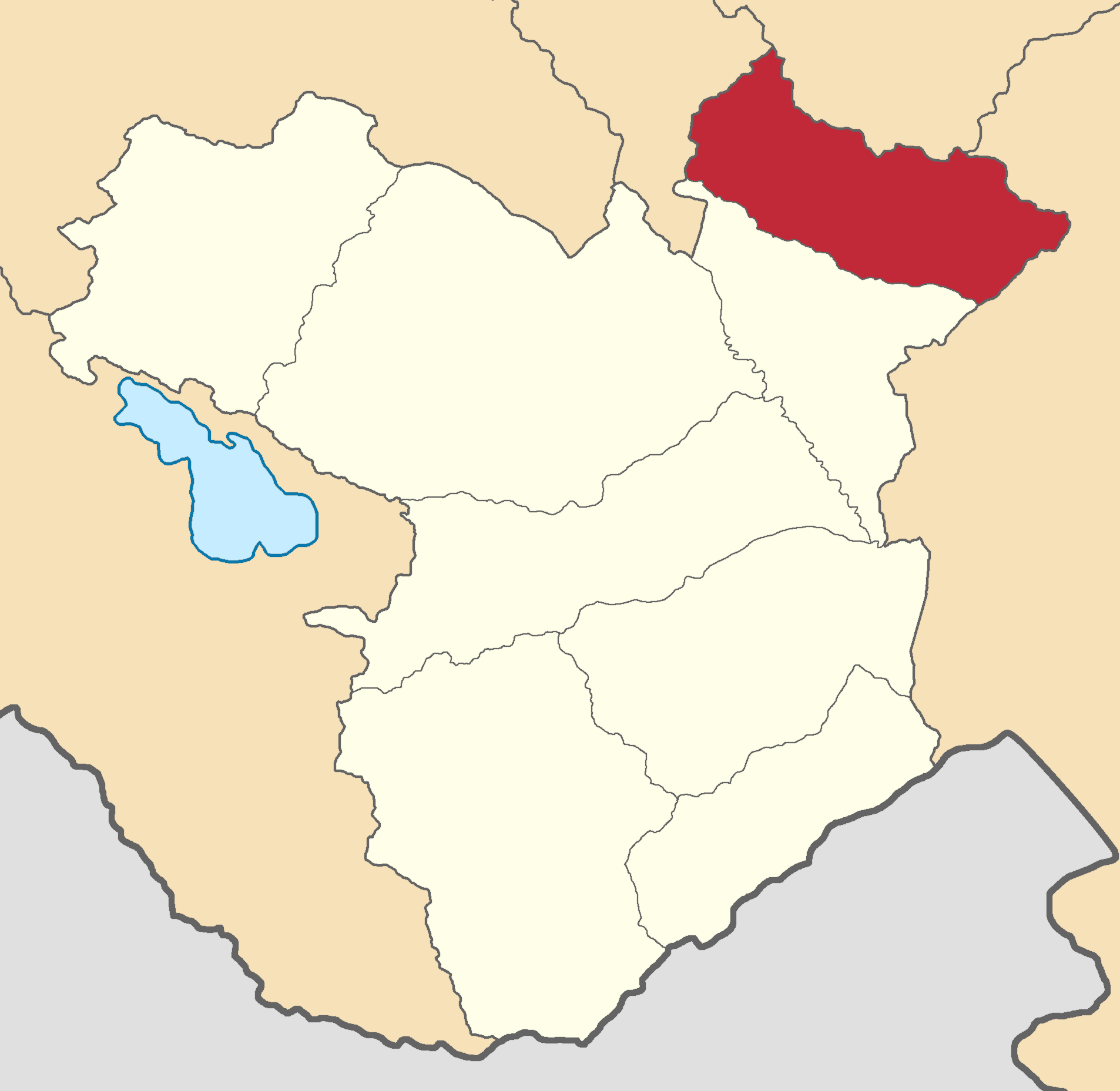
- Location in the Elizavetpol Governorate
- Country: Russian Empire
- Viceroyalty: Caucasus
- Governorate: Elizavetpol
- Established: 1868
- Abolished: 1921
- Capital: Nukha (present-day Shaki)

Area
  - Total: 4,193.79 km^{2} (1,619.23 sq mi)

Population (1916)
  - Total: 185,748
  - Density: 44.2912/km^{2} (114.714/sq mi)
  - Urban: 28.13%
  - Rural: 71.87%

The Nukha uezd (Note: Russian: Нухи́нскій уѣ́здъ, romanized: Nukhínsky uyézd; Azerbaijani: نوخه قضاسی, romanized: Nūxa qaz̤āsı) was a county (uezd) of the Elizavetpol Governorate of the Russian Empire and later of the Azerbaijan Democratic Republic with its center in Nukha (present-day Shaki). it existed from 1868 until its formal abolition in 1921 by the Soviet authorities of the Azerbaijan SSR.

== Geography ==
The Nukha uezd was located in the far northeastern part of the Elizavetpol Governorate, bordering the Dagestan Oblast to the north, the Baku Governorate to the east, the Zakatal Okrug to the west, and the Aresh uezd to the south. The administrative center of the Nukha uezd was the city of Nukha. The northern part of the county was largely mountainous and laid along the Greater Caucasus mountain range, where the altitude reaches as high as 14-15 thousand feet in altitude. The notable peaks of the district included Mount Bazardüzü (14,722 ft) and Tkhfan Dag (13,764 ft) whose valleys were enriched with many rivers. The southern part of the region possessed the best conditions for agricultural use including gardening, harvesting rice and sericulture. The main rivers in the Nukha uezd were Shin-chay, Kish-chay, Ajighan-chay, Turyanchay, Goychay which were used for irrigation purposes.

== History ==
After the establishment of Russian rule over the khanates in the South Caucasus and the implementation of administrative reforms, the territories of the erstwhile Shaki Khanate were incorporated into Shamakhi Governorate of the Russian Empire, later ebing renamed to the Baku Governorate. Upon establishment of the Elizavetpol Governorate in 1868, the Nukha uezd was transferred from the Baku to Elizavetpol Governorates. In 1874, the southern section of Nukha uezd was separated to form the Aresh uezd within the same governorate. On 30 August 1918, the Elizavetpol Governorate was officially renamed to the Ganja Governorate in an effort by the authorities of the Azerbaijan Democratic Republic to de-Russify the region of its Tsarist toponyms.

== Administrative divisions ==
The subcounties (uchastoks) of the Nukha uezd in 1912 were as follows:

Name	1912 population	Area
1-y uchastok (1-й участокъ)	25,017	332.21 square versts (378.08 km^{2}; 145.98 mi^{2})
2-y uchastok (2-й участокъ)	18,296	1,122.70 square versts (1,277.70 km^{2}; 493.32 mi^{2})
3-y uchastok (3-й участокъ)	28,257	559.82 square versts (637.11 km^{2}; 245.99 mi^{2})
4-y uchastok (4-й участокъ)	32,465	1,070.30 square versts (1,218.07 km^{2}; 470.30 mi^{2})

== Economy ==
The population was engaged primarily in agricultural farming, gardening, sericulture, tobacco growing. At the end of the 19th century, Nukha uezd was making up about 95% of tobacco production of Elizavetpol Governorate.

== Demographics ==
=== Russian Empire Census ===
According to the Russian Empire Census, the Nukha uezd had a population of 120,555 on 28 January [O.S. 15 January] 1897, including 65,244 men and 55,311 women. The majority of the population indicated Tatar (Note: Before 1918, Azerbaijanis were generally known as "Tatars". This term, employed by the Russians, referred to Turkic-speaking Muslims of the South Caucasus. After 1918, with the establishment of the Azerbaijan Democratic Republic and "especially during the Soviet era", the Tatar group identified itself as "Azerbaijani".) to be their mother tongue, with significant Armenian, Kyurin, and Udi speaking minorities.

Linguistic composition of the Nukha uezd in 1897
Language	Native speakers	%
Tatar	83,578	69.33
Armenian	18,899	15.68
Kyurin	8,506	7.06
Udi	7,030	5.83
Tat	1,752	1.45
Kazi-Kumukh	234	0.19
Russian	196	0.16
Georgian	68	0.06
Lithuanian	68	0.06
Avar-Andean	65	0.05
Jewish	35	0.03
Persian	30	0.02
Polish	27	0.02
Ukrainian	27	0.02
German	7	0.01
Belarusian	7	0.01
Greek	2	0.00
Romanian	2	0.00
Kurdish	1	0.00
Other	21	0.02
TOTAL	120,555	100.00

=== Kavkazskiy kalendar ===
According to the 1917 publication of Kavkazskiy kalendar, the Nukha uezd had a population of 185,748 on 14 January [O.S. 1 January] 1916, including 102,423 men and 83,325 women, 182,124 of whom were the permanent population, and 3,624 were temporary residents. The statistics indicated the district to be overwhelmingly Sunni Muslim with sizeable Armenian, Asiatic Christian and Shia Muslim minorities:

Nationality	Urban		Rural		TOTAL	
Nationality	Number	%	Number	%	Number	%
Sunni Muslims (Note: Primarily Turco-Tatars.)	33,813	64.72	92,552	69.32	126,365	68.03
Armenians	8,009	15.33	17,751	13.30	25,760	13.87
Asiatic Christians	0	0.00	10,668	7.99	10,668	5.74
Shia Muslims (Note: Primarily Tatars.)	9,588	18.35	1,005	0.75	10,593	5.70
North Caucasians	244	0.47	7,861	5.89	8,105	4.36
Russians	575	1.10	1,831	1.37	2,406	1.30
Jews	7	0.01	1,681	1.26	1,688	0.91
Georgians	0	0.00	156	0.12	156	0.08
Other Europeans	7	0.01	0	0.00	7	0.00
TOTAL	52,243	100.00	133,505	100.00	185,748	100.00

== Bibliography ==
- Bournoutian, George A. (2018). Armenia and Imperial Decline: The Yerevan Province, 1900–1914. Milton Park, Abingdon, Oxon: Routledge. ISBN 978-1-351-06260-2. OCLC 1037283914.
- Hovannisian, Richard G. (1971). The Republic of Armenia. Vol. 1: The First Year, 1918–1919. Berkeley: University of California Press. ISBN 978-0520019843.
- Кавказский календарь на 1913 год [Caucasian calendar for 1913] (in Russian) (68th ed.). Tiflis: Tipografiya kantselyarii Ye.I.V. na Kavkaze, kazenny dom. 1913. Archived from the original on 19 April 2022.
- Кавказский календарь на 1917 год [Caucasian calendar for 1917] (in Russian) (72nd ed.). Tiflis: Tipografiya kantselyarii Ye.I.V. na Kavkaze, kazenny dom. 1917. Archived from the original on 4 November 2021.
- Tsutsiev, Arthur (2014). Atlas of the Ethno-Political History of the Caucasus (PDF). Translated by Nora Seligman Favorov. New Haven: Yale University Press. ISBN 9780300153088. Archived (PDF) from the original on 17 June 2023.
