= Elizavetpol Governorate =

Governorate of the Russian Empire

Coordinates: 40.6828°N 46.3606°E

Elizavetpol Governorate Елисаветпольская губернія
- Governorate
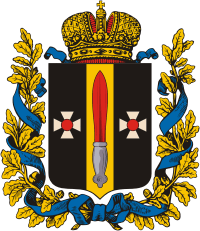
- Coat of arms

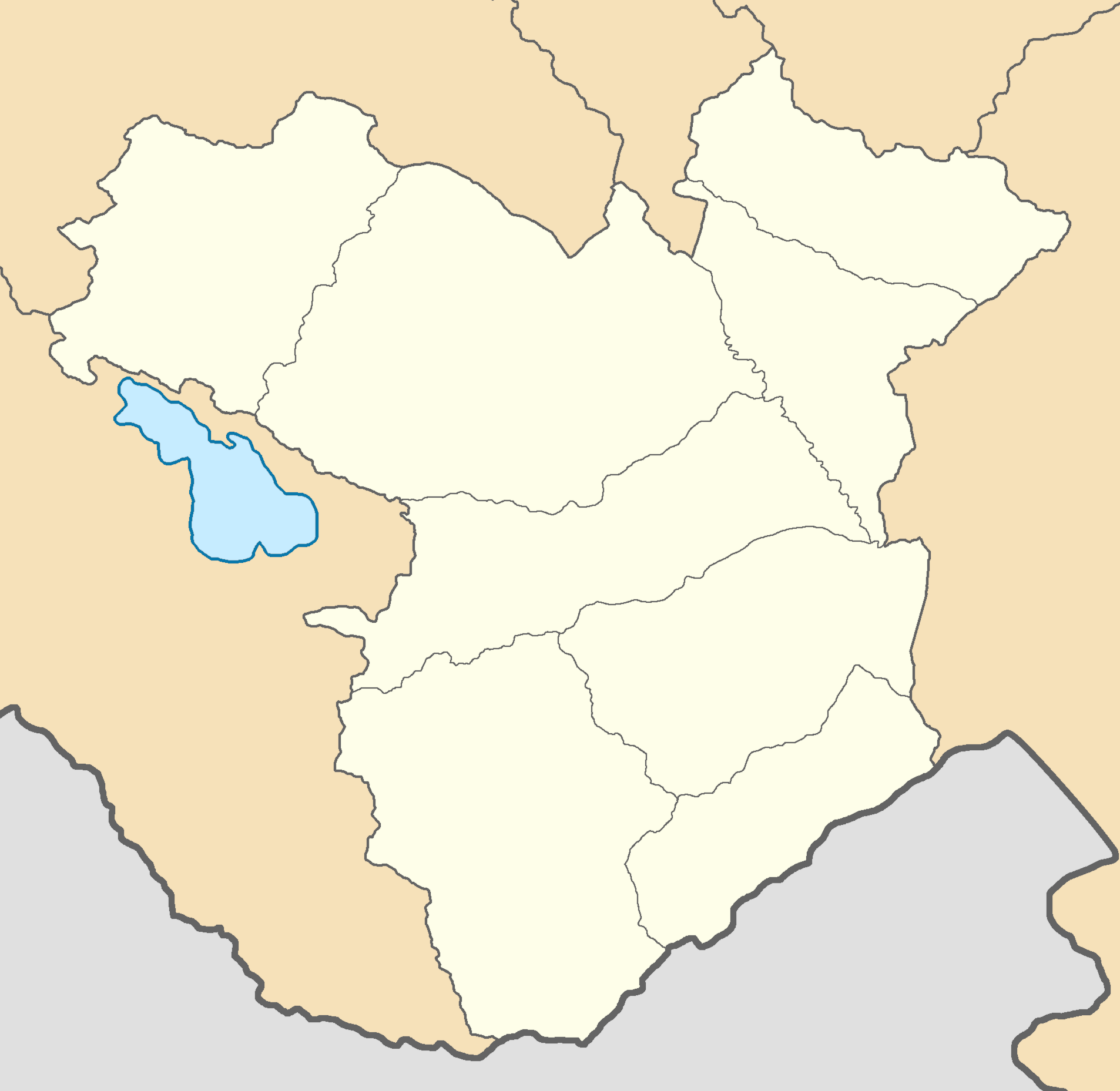
- Administrative map of the Elizavetpol Governorate
- Country: Russian Empire
- Viceroyalty: Caucasus
- Established: 1867
- Abolished: 1920
- Capital: Yelisavetpol (present-day Ganja)

Area
  - Total: 44,296.15 km^{2} (17,102.84 sq mi)
- Highest elevation (Mount Bazardüzü): 4,466 m (14,652 ft)

Population (1916)
  - Total: 1,275,131
  - Density: 28.78650/km^{2} (74.55669/sq mi)
  - Urban: 12.24%
  - Rural: 87.76%

The Elizavetpol Governorate, (Note: Russian: Елисаветпо́льская губе́рнія, romanized: Yelisavetpólskaya gubérniya; Azerbaijani: یلیساوتوپول غوبیرنیاسی, romanized: Yelizavetpol quberniyası; Armenian: Ելիզավետպոլի նահանգ, romanized: Elizavetpoli nahang) also known after 1918 as the Ganja Governorate, (Note: Russian: Ганджи́нская губе́рния, romanized: Gandzhínskaya gubérniya; Azerbaijani: گنجه غوبیرنیاسی, romanized: Gəncə quberniyası; Armenian: Գանձակի նահանգ, romanized: Gandzaki nahang) was a province (guberniya) of the Caucasus Viceroyalty of the Russian Empire, with its capital in Yelisavetpol (present-day Ganja). The area of the governorate stretched 38,922.43 square versts (44,296.15 square kilometres; 17,102.84 square miles) and was composed of 1,275,131 inhabitants in 1916. The Elizavetpol Governorate bordered the Erivan Governorate to the west, the Tiflis Governorate and Zakatal Okrug to the north, the Dagestan Oblast to the northeast, the Baku Governorate to the east, and Iran to the south.

== Geography ==
The area of the governorate includes the southern slope of the main Caucasus range in the northeast, where Mount Bazardüzü and other peaks rise above the snow-line; the arid steppes beside the Kura river, reaching 1000 ft. of altitude in the west and sinking to 100–200 ft. in the east, where irrigation is necessary; and the northern slopes of the Transcaucasian escarpment and portions of the Armenian Highlands, which is intersected towards its western boundary, near Lake Sevan, by chains of mountains consisting of trachytes and various crystalline rocks.

Elsewhere the country has the character of a plateau, 7,000 to 8,000 ft. high, deeply trenched by tributaries of the Aras. All varieties of climate are found in the snowclad peaks, Alpine meadows, and stony deserts of the high levels, to that of the hill slopes and of the arid Caspian steppes.

== History ==
Elizavetpol Governorate was created by the decree "On the transformation of the administration of the Caucasian and Transcaucasian region" dated December 9, 1867. The province included the Elizavetpol uezd of the Tiflis Governorate, the Nukha and Shusha uezds of the Baku Governorate and part of the abolished Ordubad uezd. By the same decree, the Kazakh and Zangezur uezds were formed as part of the province. In 1873, three new uezds were formed in the Governorate - Aresh, Jebrail and Jevanshir. The governorate included lands of the former Ganja Khanate, Shaki Khanate, and Karabakh Khanate. It bordered with Baku Governorate, Tiflis Governorate, Erivan Governorate, Dagestan Oblast, and Persia.

From 1905, there were attempts by Armenian intelligentsia of the Russian Empire to separate the highland areas (commonly known as Mountainous Karabakh) from the rest of Elizavetpol into a zemstvo (self-governing rural community) province.

On the establishment of the Azerbaijan Democratic Republic in May 1918, the Elizavetpol Governorate was renamed Ganja Governorate to de-Russify the region. The neighboring Democratic Republic of Armenia claimed the entirety of the western highland sections of the governorate which as a whole formed a small Armenian majority, however, Armenian control did not exceed the western parts of Zangezur, Kazakh and Karabakh. In 1919, the entirety of Karabakh south of the Murov Range with British support was separated into the Karabakh General Governorship, following the subjugation of the Karabakh Armenian Council.

The governorate provincial system was abolished in the early 1920s after the Sovietization of Azerbaijan. In early 1921—after the Sovietization of Armenia—a Dashnak Armenian revolt that spawned in Yerevan spread to the Zangezur uezd, becoming known as the Republic of Mountainous Armenia. The rebels led by Garegin Nzhdeh finally departed Zangezur in the summer of 1921 after receiving guarantees the district would remain part of Soviet Armenia.

In the present-day, the territory of the former Elizavetpol Governorate forms the bulk of western Azerbaijan and adjacent areas of northeastern and southeastern Armenia.

== Administrative divisions ==
The counties (uezds) of the Elizavetpol Governorate in 1917 were as follows:

Name	Administrative centre			Population		Area
Name		1897	1916	1897	1916	Area
Aresh uezd (Арешскій уѣздъ)	Aresh (Agdash)	528	---	67,277	99,400	2,318.16 square versts (2,638.21 km^{2}; 1,018.62 mi^{2})
Jevanshir uezd (Джеванширскій уѣздъ)	Terter (Tartar)	752	---	72,719	75,730	4,654.06 square versts (5,296.61 km^{2}; 2,045.03 mi^{2})
Elizavetpol uezd (Елисаветпольскій уѣздъ)	Yelisavetpol (Ganja)	33,625	57,731	162,788	272,477	8,726.00 square versts (9,930.73 km^{2}; 3,834.28 mi^{2})
Zangezur uezd (Зангезурскій уѣздъ)	Gerusy (Goris)	1,450	2,201	137,871	226,398	6,742.92 square versts (7,673.86 km^{2}; 2,962.89 mi^{2})
Kazakh uezd (Казахскій уѣздъ)	Kazakh (Qazax)	1,769	---	112,074	137,049	5,096.52 square versts (5,800.16 km^{2}; 2,239.45 mi^{2})
Karyagino uezd (Карягинскій уѣздъ)	Karyagino (Fuzuli)	---		66,360	89,584	3,276.81 square versts (3,729.21 km^{2}; 1,439.86 mi^{2})
Karyagino uezd (Карягинскій уѣздъ)	Jebrayil	520	---	66,360	89,584	3,276.81 square versts (3,729.21 km^{2}; 1,439.86 mi^{2})
Nukha uezd (Нухинскій уѣздъ)	Nukha (Shaki)	24,734	52,243	120,555	185,748	3,685.03 square versts (4,193.79 km^{2}; 1,619.23 mi^{2})
Shusha uezd (Шушинскій уѣздъ)	Shusha	25,881	43,869	138,771	188,745	4,423.28 square versts (5,033.97 km^{2}; 1,943.63 mi^{2})

== Demographics ==
The 1886 population estimate was 728,943, living in 3 cities (Elizavetpol, Nukha, and Shusha) and 1521 villages. According to 1886 statistics reported in Brockhaus and Efron Encyclopedic Dictionary, the Orthodox Christians constituted 0.21% of the Governorate's population, and various sektanty ("sectarians") around 1% (~7,300 people). This means that most of the ethnic Russians in the governorate at the time (1.11% of the Governorate's 728,943 population in 1886) were members of various sectarian communities such as Doukhobors and Molokans.

=== Russian Empire Census ===
According to the Russian Empire Census, the Elizavetpol Governorate had a population of 878,415 on 28 January [O.S. 16 January] 1897, including 34,776 men and 22,702 women. The majority of the population indicated Tatar (Note: Before 1918, Azerbaijanis were generally known as "Tatars". This term, employed by the Russians, referred to Turkic-speaking Muslims of the South Caucasus. After 1918, with the establishment of the Azerbaijan Democratic Republic and "especially during the Soviet era", the Tatar group identified itself as "Azerbaijani".) to be their mother tongue, with a significant Armenian speaking minority.

Linguistic composition of the Elizavetpol Governorate in 1897
Language	Native speakers	%
Tatar	534,086	60.80
Armenian	292,188	33.26
Kyurin	14,503	1.65
Russian	14,146	1.61
Udi	7,040	0.80
German	3,194	0.36
Kurdish	3,042	0.35
Belarusian	2,868	0.33
Tat	1,753	0.20
Georgian	1,239	0.14
Ukrainian	861	0.10
Polish	616	0.07
Kazi-Kumukh	581	0.07
Greek	558	0.06
Avar-Andean	461	0.05
Persian	338	0.04
Jewish	185	0.02
Lithuanian	116	0.01
Romanian	106	0.01
Other	534	0.06
TOTAL	878,415	100.00

Religious composition of the Elizavetpol Governorate in 1897
Faith	Male	Female	Both	
Faith	Male	Female	Number	%
Muslim	308,927	243,895	552,822	62.93
Armenian Apostolic	155,257	143,428	298,685	34.00
Eastern Orthodox	7,150	3,279	10,429	1.19
Old Believer	4,907	4,600	9,507	1.08
Judaism	1,013	1,017	2,030	0.23
Lutheran	1,605	1,616	3,221	0.37
Roman Catholic	685	183	868	0.10
Baptist	382	329	711	0.08
Armenian Catholic	68	37	105	0.01
Reformed	6	9	15	0.00
Anglican	5	6	11	0.00
Buddhist	1	1	2	0.00
Karaite	0	1	1	0.00
Mennonite	1	0	1	0.00
Other Christian denomination	1	2	3	0.00
Other non-Christian denomination	4	0	4	0.00
TOTAL	480,012	398,403	878,415	100.00

Linguistic composition of uezds in the Tiflis Governorate in 1897

Uezd	Tatar		Armenian		Lezgian		Russian		Udi		TOTAL
Uezd	Number	%	Number	%	Number	%	Number	%	Number	%	TOTAL
Aresh	47,133	70.06	13,822	20.54	5,997	8.91	155	0.23	4	0.01	67,277
Jevanshir	52,041	71.56	19,551	26.89	84	0.12	206	0.28	0	0.00	72,719
Elizavetpol	103,970	63.87	43,040	26.44	246	0.15	7,224	4.44	4	0.00	162,788
Zangezur	71,206	51.65	63,622	46.15	7	0.01	841	0.61	0	0.00	137,871
Kazakh	64,101	57.2	43,555	38.86	4	0.00	3,373	3.01	0	0.00	112,074
Nukha	83,578	69.33	18,899	15.68	8,740	7.25	196	0.16	7,030	5.83	120,555
Shusha	62,868	45.3	73,953	53.29	1	0.00	1,442	1.04	2	0.00	138,771
TOTAL	534,086	60.8	292,188	33.26	15,084	1.72	14,146	1.61	7,040	0.8	878,415

=== Kavkazskiy kalendar ===
According to the 1917 publication of Kavkazskiy kalendar, the Elizavetpol Governorate had a population of 1,275,131 on 14 January [O.S. 1 January] 1916, including 676,377 men and 598,754 women, 1,213,626 of whom were the permanent population, and 61,505 were temporary residents.

Nationality	Urban		Rural		TOTAL	
Nationality	Number	%	Number	%	Number	%
Shia Muslims (Note: Primarily Tatars.)	66,500	42.62	411,434	36.77	477,934	37.48
Armenians	45,254	29.00	373,605	33.38	418,859	32.85
Sunni Muslims (Note: Primarily Turco-Tatars.)	34,405	22.05	270,726	24.19	305,131	23.93
Russians	8,111	5.20	28,666	2.56	36,777	2.88
North Caucasians	493	0.32	10,673	0.95	11,166	0.88
Asiatic Christians	58	0.04	10,808	0.97	10,866	0.85
Other Europeans	367	0.24	7,048	0.63	7,415	0.58
Kurds	84	0.05	3,718	0.33	3,802	0.30
Jews	406	0.26	1,706	0.15	2,112	0.17
Georgians	366	0.23	664	0.06	1,030	0.08
Roma	0	0.00	39	0.00	39	0.00
TOTAL	156,044	100.00	1,119,087	100.00	1,275,131	100.00

== Known governors ==
- Fokion Bulatov, 1868–1876
- Alexander Nakashidze, 1880–1897
- Ivan Kireyev, 1897–1900
- Nikolai Lutsau, 1900–1905
- Yegor Baranovsky, 1905 (acting)
- Alexander Kalachev, 1905–1907
- Samkalov, 1907–1908
- Georgi Kovalev, 1908–1916
- Mikhail Poyarkov, 1916–1917

== Bibliography ==
- Bournoutian, George A. (2018). Armenia and Imperial Decline: The Yerevan Province, 1900–1914. Milton Park, Abingdon, Oxon: Routledge. ISBN 978-1-351-06260-2. OCLC 1037283914.
- Hovannisian, Richard G. (1971). The Republic of Armenia. Vol. 1: The First Year, 1918–1919. Berkeley: University of California Press. ISBN 978-0520019843.
- Кавказский календарь на 1917 год [Caucasian calendar for 1917] (in Russian) (72nd ed.). Tiflis: Tipografiya kantselyarii Ye.I.V. na Kavkaze, kazenny dom. 1917. Archived from the original on 4 November 2021.
- Tsutsiev, Arthur (2014). Atlas of the Ethno-Political History of the Caucasus (PDF). Translated by Nora Seligman Favorov. New Haven: Yale University Press. ISBN 9780300153088. Archived (PDF) from the original on 17 June 2023.
