= Jebrail uezd =

Coordinates: 39°24′00″N 47°01′34″E

Jebrail uezd Джебраильскій уѣздъ
- Uezd
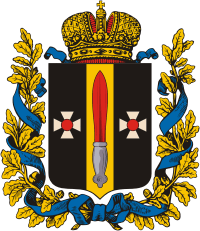
- Coat of arms

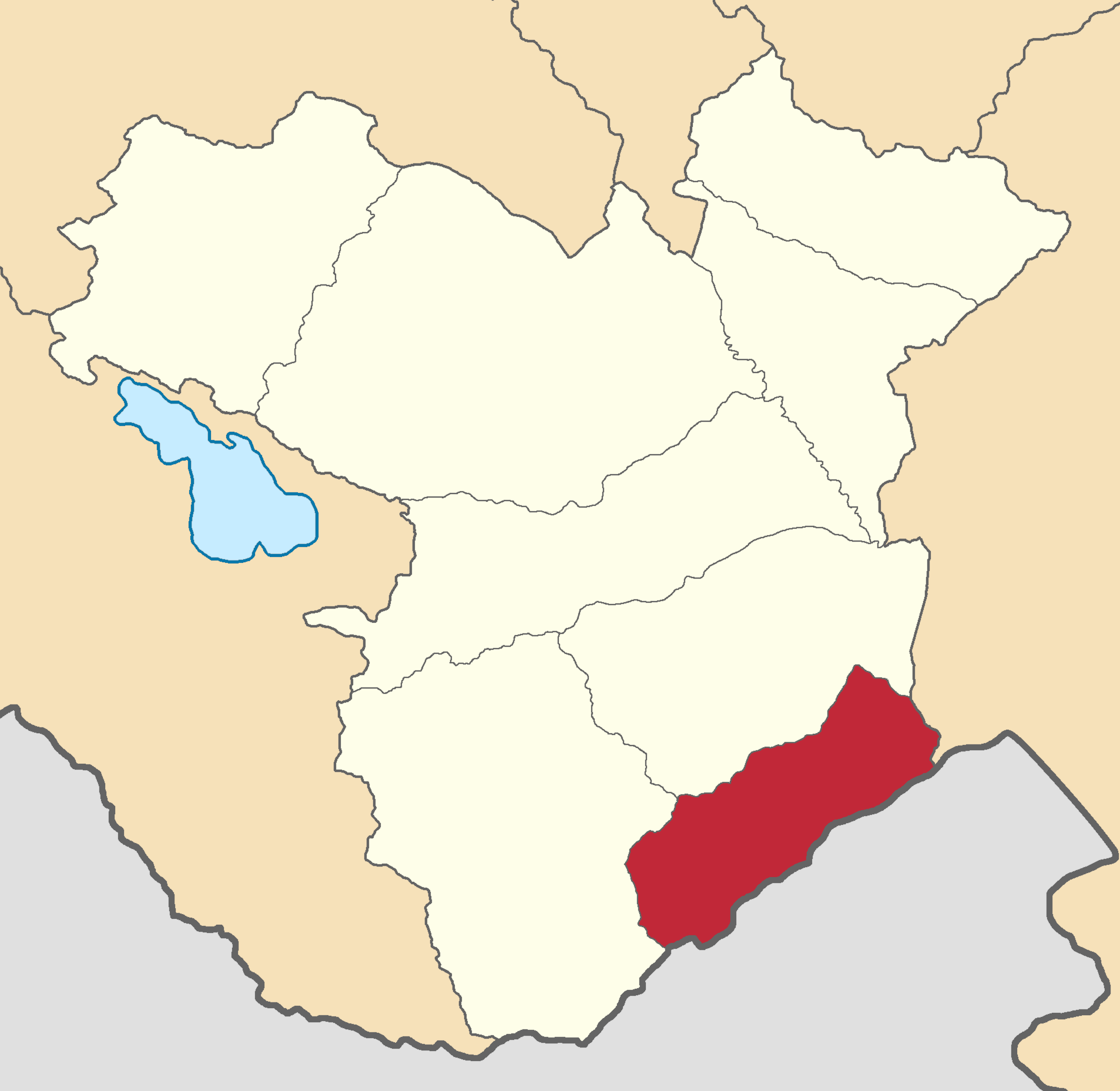
- Location in the Elizavetpol Governorate
- Country: Russian Empire
- Viceroyalty: Caucasus
- Governorate: Elizavetpol
- Established: 1873
- Abolished: 1921
- Capital: Jebrail (present-day Jabrayil; 1873–1905); Karyagino (present-day Fuzuli; 1905–1921)

Area
  - Total: 3,729.21 km^{2} (1,439.86 sq mi)

Population (1916)
  - Total: 89,584
  - Density: 24.022/km^{2} (62.217/sq mi)
  - Rural: 100.00%

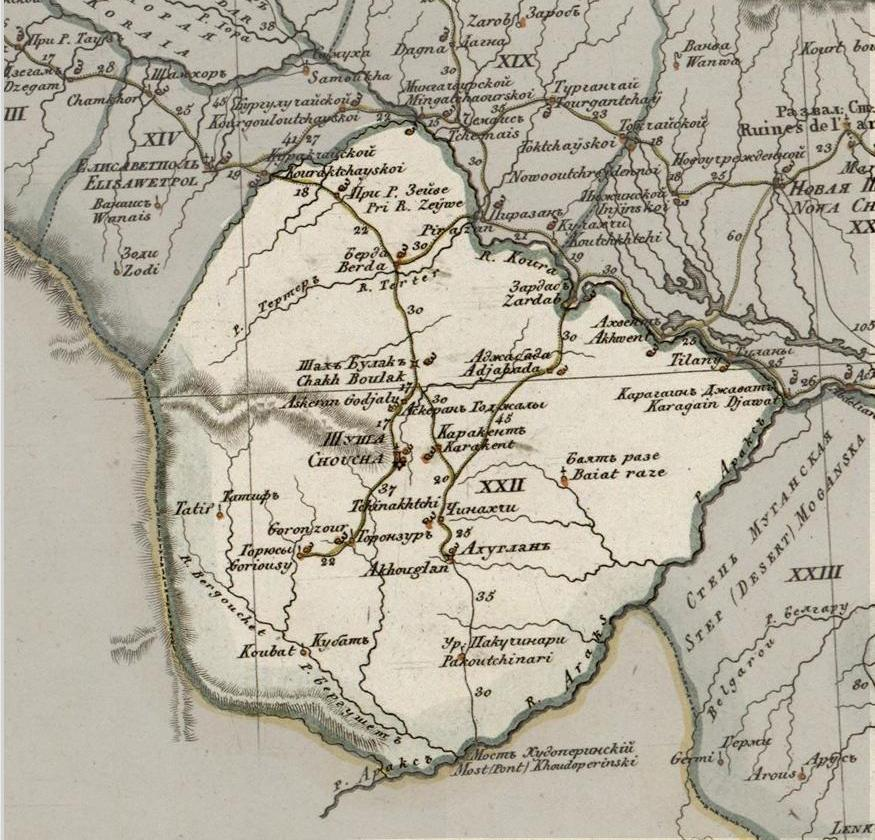
Karabakh Khanate on a map of 1823

The Jebrail uezd, (Note: Russian: Джебраи́льскій уѣ́здъ, romanized: Dzhebraílsky uyézd; Azerbaijani: جبرائیل قضاسی, romanized: Cabrā‘ıl qaz̤āsı) also known after 1905 as the Karyagino uezd, (Note: Russian: Каряги́нскій уѣ́здъ, romanized: Karyagínsky uyézd; Azerbaijani: قاریاقین قضاسی, romanized: Qāryāqīn qaz̤āsı, or قاریاگین قضاسی, Qāryāgīn qaz̤āsı) was a county (uezd) of the Elizavetpol Governorate of the Russian Empire with its center in Jebrail (Jabrayil) from 1873 until its formal abolition in 1921 by the Soviet authorities.

== Geography ==
The Jebrayil uezd was located in the southeastern part of Elizavetpol Governorate bordering its Shusha uezd to the north, Zangezur uezd to the west, Baku Governorate to the east, and Persia to the south. The area of the county was 2922.6 square verst. The northwestern part of the county was mountainous. Mount Ziyarat (Azerbaijani: Ziyarət) or Dizapayt (Armenian: Դիզափայտ) reaches 8,186 feet. The higher ground was usually used for pastures. The whole county was located within the Araz river basin. The tributaries of Araz, Kendalan, Kuru-chay, Chereken, Gozlu-chay and Hakari-chay were utilized for irrigation.

== History ==
The territory of the county had previously formed a part of the Karabakh Khanate until 1813, when according to Gulistan Treaty it was annexed into the Russian Empire as part of the Karabakh province. In 1840, the province was transformed into Shusha uezd and in 1873 the southern part of Shusha uezd was detached and established as the separate Jabrail uezd. The administrative center was Jabrail, which was used as a customs office on the border with Persian Empire which the district bordered.

In 1905, the Jabrail uezd was officially renamed the Karyagino uezd as its center was transferred to the town Karyagino (present-day Fizuli), which was renamed from its original Karabulak in honor of Colonel Pavel Karyagin, a distinguished hero of the Russo-Turkish War (1768-1774) and the Russo-Persian War (1804-1813).

After the dissolution of the Russian Empire and the formation of the independent Transcaucasian republics, including the Azerbaijan Democratic Republic in 1918, the western mountainous districts of the Elizavetpol Governorate including the Shusha, Zangezur, Jebrail, Jevanshir, Kazakh and Elizavetpol uezds became subject to intense territorial disputes between Armenia and Azerbaijan throughout 1918-1920, both of whom included these areas in their territorial pretensions that they presented in memorandums to the Paris Peace Conference.

Since the collapse of Russian authority in the Transcaucasus, the mountainous portion of the county which was overwhelmingly Armenian was governed by the de facto Karabakh Council which vehemently rejected Ottoman and Azerbaijani attempts to subordinate the region. However, following the arrival of British forces in Transcaucasia, the Karabakh Council reluctantly submitted to provisional Azerbaijani rule through the Governor-Generalship of Karabakh, led by Dr. Khosrov bey Sultanov, due to the exerted British pressure on the council in August 1919.

After the establishment of Soviet rule in Azerbaijan, the town Karabulag which was designated as the new capital of the district was renamed to Sardar, then to Karyagino and finally to Fizuli in 1959, as the capital of Fizuli Rayon.

In the aftermath of the dissolution of the Soviet Union, The area of the Fizuli Rayon was occupied in August 1993 by ethnic Armenian forces of the de facto Nagorno-Karabakh (Artsakh) Republic during the First Nagorno-Karabakh War, however, the area was recaptured by Azerbaijani armed forces during the 2020 Nagorno-Karabakh war and reincorporated into the contemporary Republic of Azerbaijan.

== Administrative divisions ==
The subcounties (uchastoks) of the Jebrail uezd in 1912 were as follows:

Name	1912 population	Area
1-y uchastok (1-й участокъ)	20,769	1,249.50 square versts (1,422.01 km^{2}; 549.04 mi^{2})
2-y uchastok (2-й участокъ)	32,450	605.90 square versts (689.55 km^{2}; 266.24 mi^{2})
3-y uchastok (3-й участокъ)	22,600	1,420.91 square versts (1,617.08 km^{2}; 624.36 mi^{2})

== Economy ==
There were 178 settlements in the county, the population of which was primarily engaged in agricultural farming, gardening, sericulture. According to statistical data from 1891, there were 37,000 of great and 108,000 of small cattle.

== Demographics ==
=== Russian Empire Census ===
According to the Russian Empire Census, the Jebrail uezd had a population of 66,360 on 28 January [O.S. 15 January] 1897, including 36,389 men and 29,971 women. The majority of the population indicated Tatar (Note: Before 1918, Azerbaijanis were generally known as "Tatars". This term, employed by the Russians, referred to Turkic-speaking Muslims of the South Caucasus. After 1918, with the establishment of the Azerbaijan Democratic Republic and "especially during the Soviet era", the Tatar group identified itself as "Azerbaijani".) to be their mother tongue, with a significant Armenian speaking minority.

Linguistic composition of the Jebrail uezd in 1897
Language	Native speakers	%
Tatar	49,189	74.12
Armenian	15,746	23.73
Russian	709	1.07
Kurdish	398	0.60
Ukrainian	183	0.28
Polish	45	0.07
German	26	0.04
Georgian	11	0.02
Persian	10	0.02
Kazi-Kumukh	5	0.01
Romanian	4	0.01
Avar-Andean	3	0.00
Lithuanian	2	0.00
Belarusian	1	0.00
Greek	1	0.00
Other	27	0.04
TOTAL	66,360	100.00

=== Kavkazskiy kalendar ===
According to the 1917 publication of Kavkazskiy kalendar, the Jebrail uezd—then known as the Karyagino uezd—had a population of 89,584 on 14 January [O.S. 1 January] 1916, including 44,493 men and 45,091 women, 86,197 of whom were the permanent population, and 3,387 were temporary residents. The statistics indicated Shia Muslims to be the plurality of the population with significant Armenian, Sunni Muslim, and Russian minorities:

Nationality	Number	%
Shia Muslims (Note: Primarily Tatars.)	44,345	49.50
Armenians	21,755	24.28
Sunni Muslims (Note: Primarily Turco-Tatars.)	21,242	23.71
Russians	2,083	2.33
Other Europeans	104	0.12
Kurds	45	0.05
Georgians	9	0.01
Jews	1	0.00
TOTAL	89,584	100.00

=== 1926 Soviet census ===
According to Soviet census from 1926, the population fell to 75,371—due to the separation of the territory of the Nagorno-Karabakh Autonomous Oblast from the district—of which 71,725 were Turks (i.e. Azerbaijanis), 625 - Armenians, 1,089 - Russians, 520 - Persians.

== Bibliography ==
- Bournoutian, George A. (2018). Armenia and Imperial Decline: The Yerevan Province, 1900–1914. Milton Park, Abingdon, Oxon: Routledge. ISBN 978-1-351-06260-2. OCLC 1037283914.
- Hovannisian, Richard G. (1971). The Republic of Armenia. Vol. 1: The First Year, 1918–1919. Berkeley: University of California Press. ISBN 978-0520019843.
- Кавказский календарь на 1913 год [Caucasian calendar for 1913] (in Russian) (68th ed.). Tiflis: Tipografiya kantselyarii Ye.I.V. na Kavkaze, kazenny dom. 1913. Archived from the original on 19 April 2022.
- Кавказский календарь на 1917 год [Caucasian calendar for 1917] (in Russian) (72nd ed.). Tiflis: Tipografiya kantselyarii Ye.I.V. na Kavkaze, kazenny dom. 1917. Archived from the original on 4 November 2021.
- Tsutsiev, Arthur (2014). Atlas of the Ethno-Political History of the Caucasus (PDF). Translated by Nora Seligman Favorov. New Haven: Yale University Press. ISBN 9780300153088. Archived (PDF) from the original on 17 June 2023.
