= Verst =

Obsolete Russian unit of length

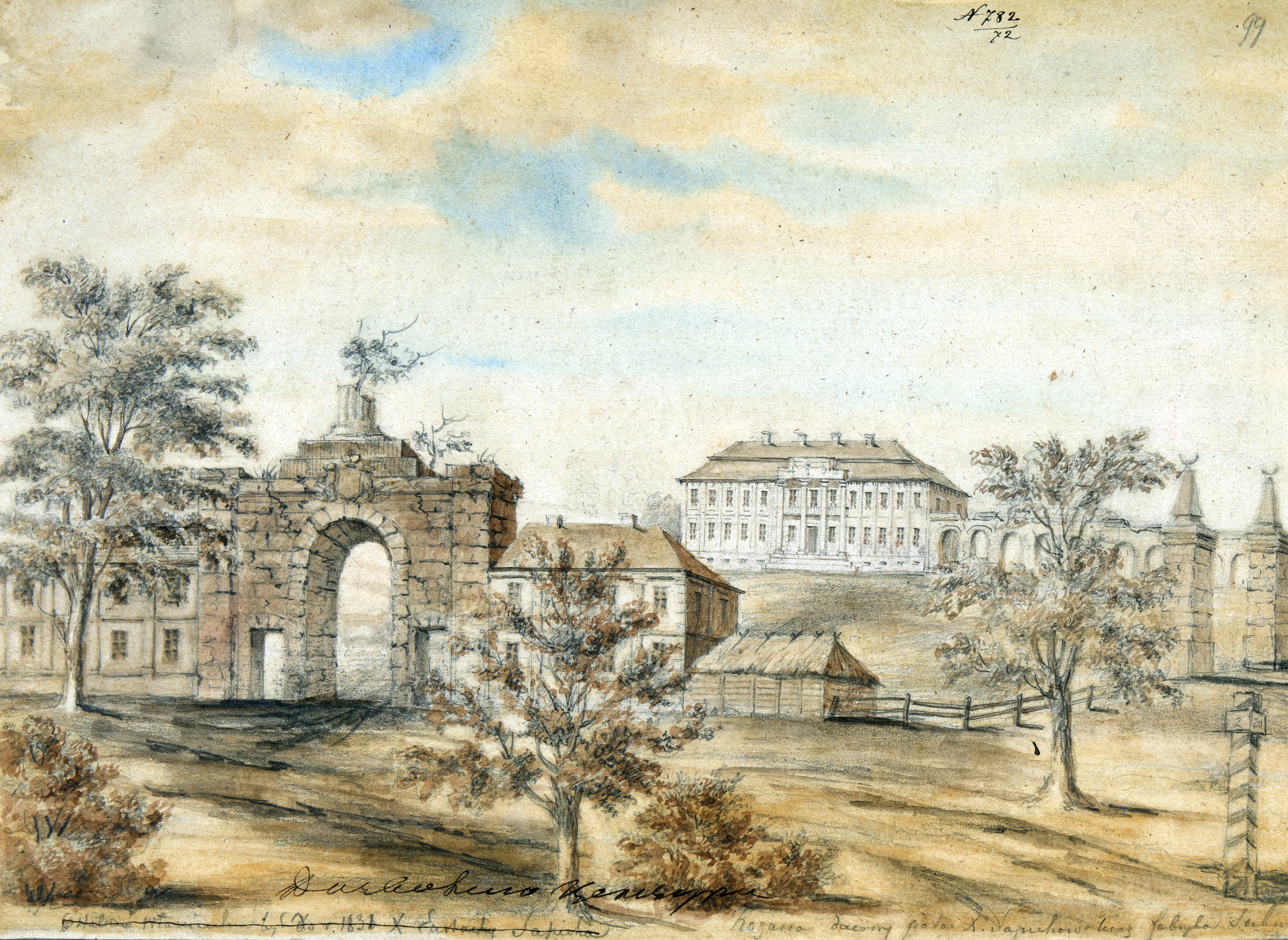
- Highway location verst marker in Ruzhany, Russian Empire. Napoleon Orda, 1863

General information
- Unit system: Russian units
- Unit of: Length

Conversions
1 in ...	... is equal to ...
- Sazhen: 1±500 Sazhen
- SI base units: 1.0668 km
- Mile: 0.6630 mi

A verst (/vɜːst/; Russian: верста, romanized: versta) is an obsolete Russian unit of length, defined as 500 sazhen. This makes a verst equal to 1.0668 kilometres (3,500 feet).

== Plurals and variants ==
In the English language, verst is singular with the normal plural versts. In Russian, the nominative singular is versta, but the form usually used with numbers is the genitive plural verst—10 verst, 25 verst, etc.—whence the English form.

A mezhevaya versta (Russian: межевая верста, literally "border verst") is twice as long as a verst.

The verst of the 17th century was 700 sazhens or 1.49 km as against the 500 sazhens or 1.067 km it became at the time of Peter the Great.

== Finnish virsta ==
In Finland, a virsta was 1,068.84 m according to the Swedish standard, defined in 1827 as 1/10 of a peninkulma, the Finnish language name for the pre-metric Swedish mil, used in Finland since the early 17th century (see Obsolete Finnish units of measurement), or 600 syli (Swedish fathoms, 1.781 m). Metrication replaced virsta with the kilometre in the 1880s.

== Sources ==
- "Верста" . Brockhaus and Efron Encyclopedic Dictionary (in Russian). 1906.
