= Isaac Hull =

United States Navy Commodore

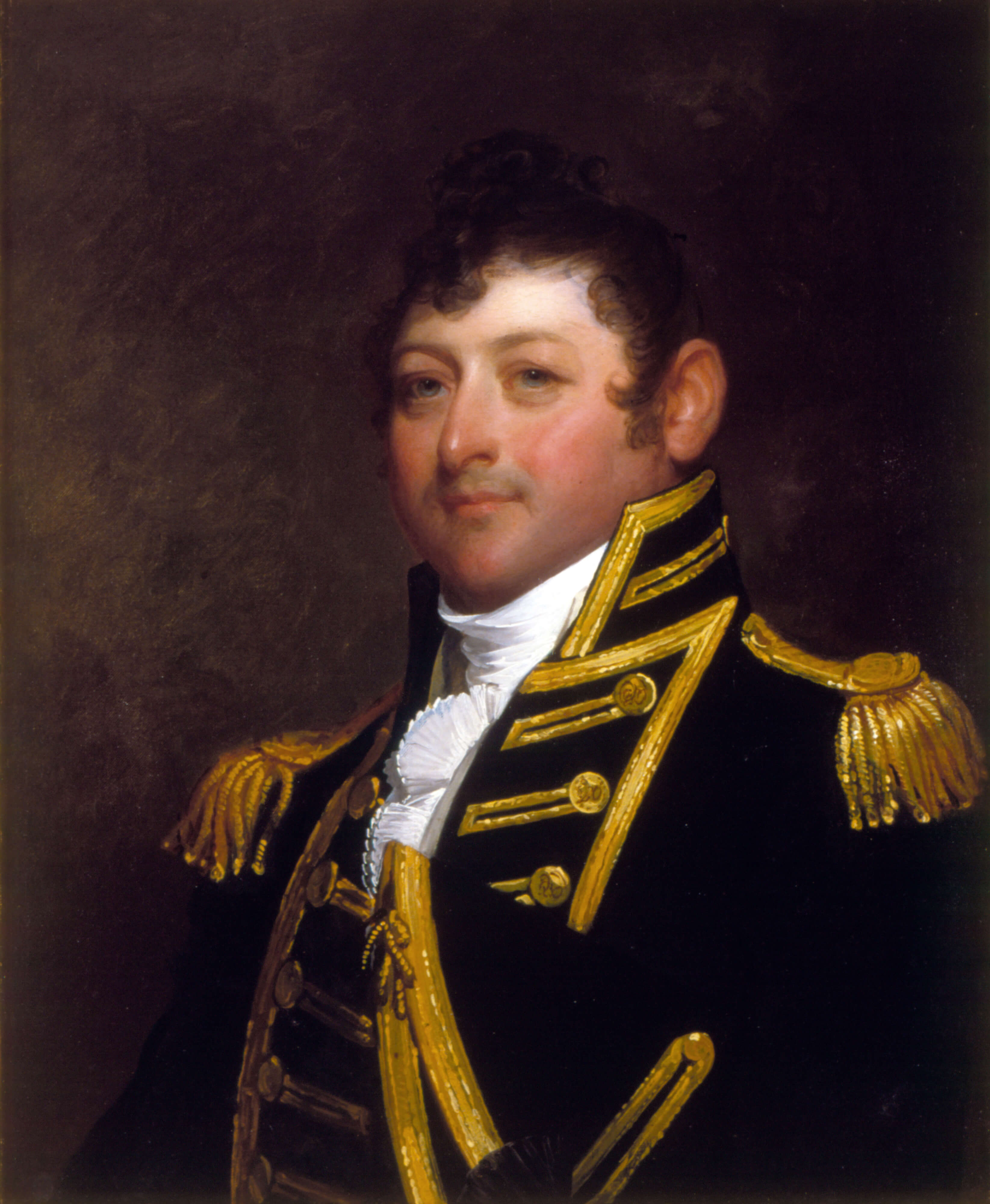
- Portrait by Gilbert Stuart, c. 1807
- Born: March 9, 1773; Derby, Connecticut Colony, British America
- Died: February 13, 1843 (aged 69); Philadelphia, Pennsylvania, U.S.
- Burial place: Laurel Hill Cemetery, Philadelphia, Pennsylvania, U.S.
- Military career
- Allegiance: United States
- Branch: United States Navy
- Service years: 1798–1843
- Rank: Commodore
- Commands: USS Argus, USS Chesapeake, USS President, USS Constitution
- Conflicts: Quasi-War; Battle of Puerto Plata Harbor; War of 1812; USS Constitution vs HMS Guerriere
- Awards: Congressional Gold Medal

Commodore Isaac Hull (March 9, 1773 – February 13, 1843) was a United States Navy officer who served in the Quasi-War, Barbary Wars and War of 1812. During his military career, he commanded the warships USS Argus, USS Chesapeake, USS President, and USS Constitution. During the War of 1812, Hull, commanding Constitution, captured the British frigate HMS Guerriere. He also served as commandant of the Washington Navy Yard and in the Mediterranean Squadron during the Second Barbary War. Hull died in Philadelphia at the age of 69 and was interred at the Laurel Hill Cemetery.

== Early life ==
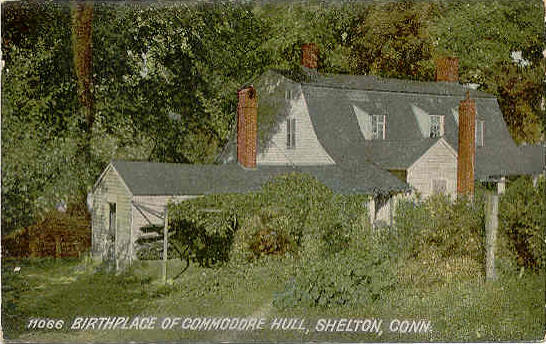
Claimed birthplace, Shelton, Connecticut

Hull was born in Derby, Connecticut (some sources say Huntington, now Shelton, Connecticut), on March 9, 1773. Early in life he joined his mariner father, Joseph, on local voyages and longer trips to the West Indies. After his father died while still young, Isaac was adopted by his uncle William Hull, a veteran of the American Revolutionary War.

During the mid-1790s, the young Hull commanded several merchant vessels, losing some to French Republic privateers.

In 1813, he married Anne McCurdy Hart.

== Naval service ==
He was commissioned a lieutenant in the newly formed United States Navy on 9 March 1798 and distinguished himself during the next two years while serving on board the new heavy frigate USS Constitution in the undeclared naval Quasi-War with France. During his time on USS Constitution, Hull served as first lieutenant and executive officer to Captain Silas Talbot. Talbot was in command from June 5, 1799 until September 8, 1801. Since Talbot was also a squadron commander, much of the everyday running of the ship fell to Hull and provided him invaluable experience managing a ship of war. Hull much admired Talbot, a hero of the American Revolutionary War (1775–1783), and learned a great deal from the older man. Hull's chief biographer Linda M. Maloney states Talbot "was undoubtedly the formative influence on Hull's naval career, the man he modeled himself after." From Talbot, Hull learned the lessons of naval leadership, moderation and to look out for the training of his junior officers and ship crew. Captain Talbot resigned his Commission and he was ordered to take command of Constitution in a letter dated 21 September 1801.

=== First Barbary War ===
When troubles with the Barbary states heated up in 1802, he went to the Mediterranean Sea as first lieutenant of the frigate USS Adams. Hull later commanded the schooner USS Enterprise and the brig USS Argus, receiving promotion to the rank of master commandant on 18 May 1804, and to captain in 1806. During this time Hull made a reputation as an effective and reliable commander. Midshipman Henry Wadsworth, writing in his journal for August 10, 1803, noted: "This morning at day light the USS Enterprise being at a distance of several miles discovered a galley at long shot. Captain Hull fired on her & gave chase. She fired to leeward (signal for friend) but did not heave too. The Enterprise came near her & she hove too: proved to be a Sardinian Galley, last from Civita Vecchia on a cruise 25 oars on each side (Captain Hull imagined) carried about 300 hundred men had 2 eighteen pounders mounted forward & 2 smaller guns aft. A noble Galley!!!" During the next few years, he supervised the construction of gunboats and, in 1809 and 1810, was successively given command of the frigates USS Chesapeake, USS President, and USS Constitution.

=== Command of USS Chesapeake ===
On 2 February 1809 Hull took command of USS Chesapeake with orders to enforce the trade embargo, but a month later the embargo was repealed and the vessel returned to Boston for minor repairs and filling out the crew. During this time Hull helped the recruiting service. Keeping ships manned was a source of major anxiety for Hull throughout his long career. Hull found it necessary on occasion to take drastic measures to prevent men lured by bounty money from deserting, as he explained in an April 16, 1810 letter to the Secretary of the Navy Paul Hamilton justifying his placing newly recruited men in irons and confinement prior to sailing. "With two months advance from the merchant ship, and advance and bounty from the recruiting officer and other expenses brought them in debt from fifty to eighty dollars." Having the full complement of men necessary to crew a frigate was a constant challenge. Exacerbating the challenge was a cold fact: recruitment was voluntary—there was no draft or impressment service as in the British navy. Poor pay and conditions of life on a warship in the pre-1815 U.S. Navy meant Hull and other commanding officers were plagued by expired enlistments and high rates of desertion. For naval enlisted men there was no fixed term of service, seamen served for a voyage or cruise on a particular ship, hence at the end of voyage, they felt free to leave and often did. For naval ships at every port call desertion was a reality. Despite extracting harsh penalties such as flogging, the problem persisted. While reliable data is scarce, one scholar notes the desertion rate for petty officers and enlisted men on board USS Hornet was 12.8%, and states the number one reason for enlisted courts martial was desertion. In all, Hull was in command of USS Chesapeake for seven months.

=== Command of USS President ===
On 7 May 1810, Isaac Hull was ordered to assume command of the new frigate USS President, but his tenure was short. The reason for Hull's short stay was Commodore John Rodgers. Rodgers had almost simultaneously been ordered to USS Constitution. John Rodgers too had sailed Constitution from New York and did not like the way she sailed. The frigate had seen years of hard service, her bottom was fouled by mussels and barnacles, and her sails were worn; Rodgers also objected to the way she handled. Rodgers made complaint to Secretary Hamilton that as ranking senior naval captain, he should have had President. Hamilton agreed, and Hull apparently was only too happy to swap, for on 17 June 1810, Rodgers took President and Hull assumed command of Constitution.

=== Command of USS Constitution ===
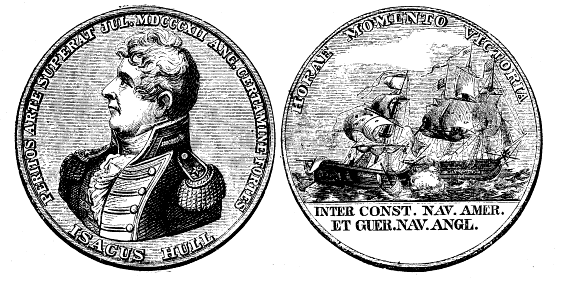
Medal awarded to Hull by the United States Congress

Isaac Hull assumed command of the frigate USS Constitution in June 1810; his time on the ship was eventful. As commanding officer Hull "modeled himself on Silas Talbot", his mentor and a former commander of Constitution. Hull "among the enlisted men, he now commanded, on her maiden voyage was perhaps, the most popular captain in the service. He was also, perhaps the greatest all-round seaman in the navy with a genius for ship-handling and navigation that would serve him well in the weeks to come." On Constitution he was very much at home; it was his "favorite frigate". Writing to his sister in-law Mary Wheeler, he exclaimed, "I now have one of the best ships in our Navy ..." Like Silas Talbot, Hull took great care in the training of his young officers by seeing to their comforts and their education. Like Talbot too, Hull trained his enlisted men, many of whom had never served on a ship of war before, especially in gunnery. He "exercised the men at the great guns up to two hours daily over several weeks to infuse them with confidence and competence to face the enemy in battle." Hull discouraged flogging and found the practice abhorrent for trivial offenses. He prohibited his officers from punishing seamen or marines in his absence. Hull gave direction that the punishment for missing muster or any trifling offense "shall not exceed three lashes with a small rope over the shirt." The typical penalty of the era was eight to ten on the bare back. Hull did authorize flogging for more serious offenses; for example on "12 August 1812 John W. Smith and John Smith were each given a dozen lashes for drunkenness and the latter for insolence." He took the vessel on a European cruise in 1811–1812, returning home before the War of 1812 broke out between the United States and Great Britain. Constitution left Chesapeake Bay in July 1812.

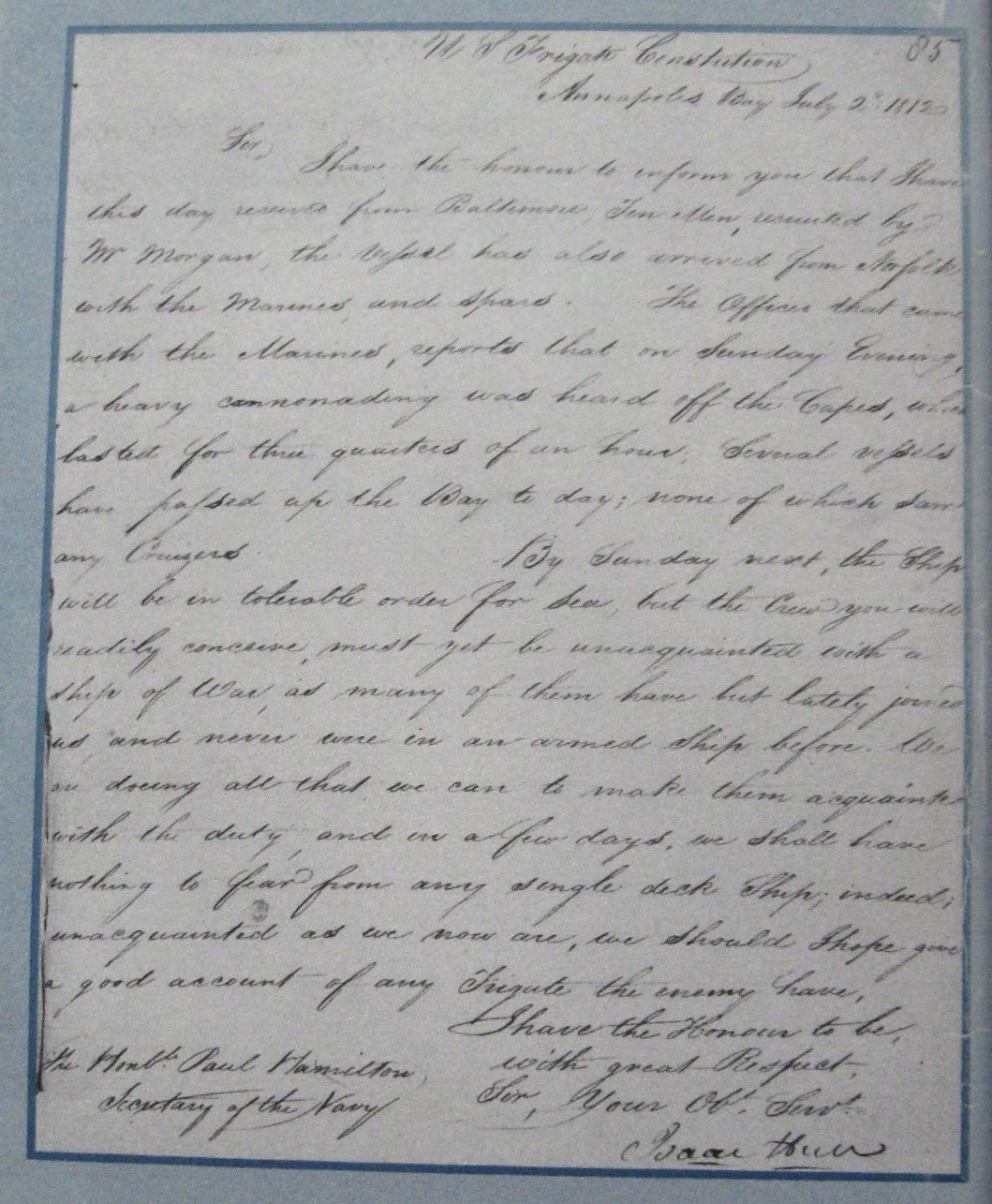
"We shall have nothing to fear from any single deck Ship". Letter Isaac Hull to Paul Hamilton July 2, 1812 re status of USS Constitution and crew. NARA Washington D.C., RG45, CL, 1812 Vol. 2, No. 85.

In a letter dated July 2, 1812, Hull wrote from on board the Constitution to Secretary of the Navy Paul Hamilton:

By Sunday next, the Ship will be in tolerable order for Sea but the crew you will readily conceive must yet be unacquainted with a Ship of War, as many of them have lately joined us and never were in an armed Ship before. We are doing all that we can to make them acquainted with their duties, and in a few days, we shall have nothing to fear from any single deck Ship; indeed; unacquainted as we now are, we should I hope give a good account of any Frigate the enemy have.

Shortly thereafter they were followed by five ships of the British Halifax Squadron commanded by Commodore Philip Broke. The squadron was composed of one ship of the line and four frigates HMS Africa, Shannon, Belvidera, Aeolus and Guerriere, who were in close pursuit for two days. Hull evaded the British squadron by warping his ship ahead and using his long boats to tow Constitution. The chase by the Halifax Squadron was long and arduous and established Hull's reputation for courage, daring and seamanship. "For sixty four hours the frigate had been insight of an overwhelming enemy and most of the time actively pursued by them," yet Constitution managed to escape.

On August 19, 1812, USS Constitution encountered the British frigate HMS Guerriere at sea. As Constitution's crew went to quarters, Hull cautioned his gunners: "No firing at random. Let every man look well to his aim." Captain James Richard Dacres of Guerriere at first tried to cripple Constitution at long range, but quickly found this tactic of no avail. He then approached Constitution at close range. All the while Captain Hull kept his crew calm telling them "I'll tell you when to fire, so stand steady and see that not a shot is thrown away." At 6:05 the two ships were alongside and Constitution's starboard guns, at Hull's orders, poured in a broadside of "double-shotted" (two round shots loaded in one gun and fired at the same time). Writing on August 28, 1812 to Secretary of the Navy Paul Hamilton, Hull recalled, 'when we were within less than a pistol shot, we commenced a very heavy fire from all our guns, loaded with round and grape, which done great Execution, so much that within fifteen minutes from the time we got alongside, his Mizzen Mast went by the board, and his Main Yard in the Slings and the Hull and Sails very much injured, which made it difficult for them to manage her." Hull continued: the enemy put his helm to port, "at the time we did, but his Mizzen Mast being over the Quarter prevented her coming too, which brought us across his Bow, when his Bowsprit over our Stern. At this moment I determined to board him, but the instant the Boarders were called, for that purpose, his Foremast and Main Mast went by the board and took with them the Gib boom and every spar except the Bowsprit ... we stood off for about half an hour to repair our braces and other riggings that had been shot away and wore around to return to the enemy, it being now dark we could not see whether she had any colors flying or not." Moses Smith, a seaman, would later recall "Several shot now entered our hull. One of the largest the enemy could command struck us, but the plank was so hard it fell out and sank in the waters. This was afterwards noticed and the cry arose: 'Huzza! Her sides are made of iron! See where the shot fell-out!' From that circumstance the name of the Constitution was garnished with the familiar title." USS Constitution had pounded HMS Guerriere into a wreck.

The deck log of USS Constitution dated August 19, 1812 contains the following account (all spelling original) of the battle: "... at 5 minutes after 6 PM hauled down the Jib and lay the Main Top Sail Shivering and opened on him a heavy fire from all our Guns, at 15 minutes after 6 PM the Enemy's Mizen Mast fell over on the Starboard Side, on which our Crew gave three cheers, we then fore reaching on him, attempted raking of his Bow, but our braces being shot away and Jib Haulyards we could not effect it, he immediately attempted raking of our Stern but failed also, getting but one of his Guns to bear upon us, which he discharged with little or no effect, having his Bowsprit entangled in our Mizin Rigging, our Marines during that time Keeping up a very brisk and gauling fire on him from the Tafferall, taffrail, the railing at the ship's stern and our Boarders preparing to board, at which time Lieutenant Charles Morris, and Lieutenant William S. Bush of the Marines fell from off the Tafferall, the former severely wounded and the latter killed, our vessel having way on her shot clear of him, when immediately, it being then 30 minutes after 6 PM his Fore, and Main Masts fell over on the Starboard side, Sett Fore and Main Course, and Stood to the Eastward and took one reef in the Topsails, in order to reeve our braces and haulyards which had been shot away; during which time the Enemy a complete wreck, under his Spritsail, fired a Gun in token of submission to Leeward which we answered as soon as our Topsails were sett, and our braces rove by wearing Ship, and running under his Lee, hauling up our Courses and laying our Main Topsail to the Mast, and sending a boat with Lieutenant Reed on board of the Prize, at 1/2 past 7 PM hoisted out all the Boats, to take out the Prisoners, sent the 2d & 3d cutters on board with the Surgeons Mate to assist in dressing the wounded, and the Sailing Master in the First Cutter with a Ten inch hawser to take the prize in tow, ..."

Captain Dacres, though wounded, signaled the surrender and Hull sent boats to Guerriere for their wounded and to take the remaining crew prisoner. In all seven American sailors were killed and seven wounded. The crew of Guerriere suffered 15 killed and 78 wounded; with 257 captured. Hull was a magnanimous victor, complementing Captain Dacres and his crew on their courage, and after Dacres presented him his sword, Hull graciously returned it. Ship Log August 20, 1812 "[R]emoved the prisoners and baggage from the prize ship. Sent a surgeon's mate to assist the wounded, [H]aving removed all prisoners ... immediately set her a fire, and at quarter pass 3, she blew-up." The action electrified the nation, made Captain Hull a national hero in the United States and demonstrated that the small U.S. Navy could pose a challenge to British command of the sea. On September 9, 1814 Secretary of the Navy Hamilton wrote the Captain: "In this action we know not most to applaud, your gallantry, or your skill. You and your crew are entitled to and will receive the applause and gratitude of your grateful country. As reward for this achievement, the U.S. Congress voted Captain Hull a gold medal with silver copies for his commissioned officers, and Constitution's entire crew shared $50,000 in prize money for HMS Guerriere's destruction.

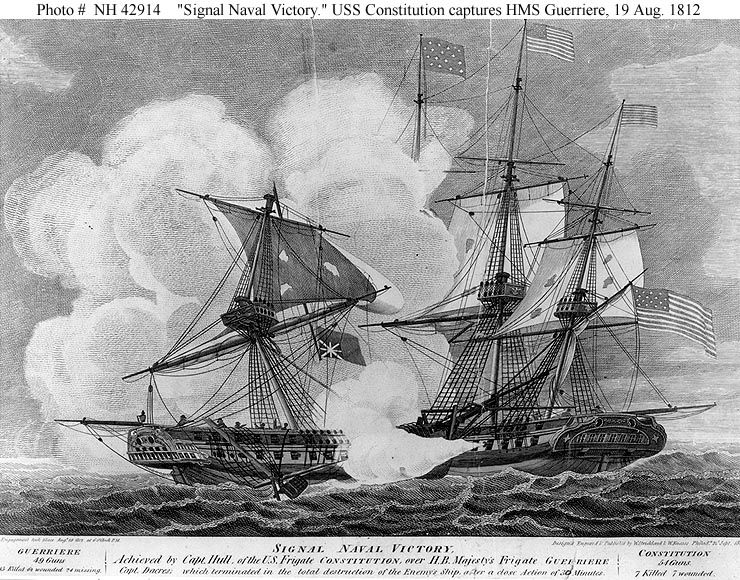
Battle between USS Constitution and HMS Guerriere 19 August 1812

=== Portsmouth Navy Yard ===
Hull commanded the Portsmouth Navy Yard at Kittery, Maine, for the rest of the War of 1812. Hull assumed command of the Portsmouth Navy Yard on 9 April 1813 and remained until he was relieved by Commodore Thomas Macdonough on 1 July 1815. During Hull's tenure as commandant the primary focus was on the fitting out of USS Congress, construction of USS Washington and improvements to the defense of the navy yard One of the most important innovations during Hull's tenure at Portsmouth was the construction of a shiphouse. Hull, a Connecticut native, knew that in order for the shipyard to succeed, the workers and the vessels needed cover during the long and cold New England winters. Writing to the Secretary of the Navy William Jones on 24 July 1813, Hull noted "As the Winters here are very cold and large quantities of Snow falls, may I be permitted to suggest the idea of covering the Ship after she is framed. The cost to build a permanent cover would probably be two thousand dollars, and I believe a greater part of it would be saved in building this ship and others could be built under it, so that by having one much would be saved in labor besides the injury to the Frame by being exposed to the winter and the sun the next summer." The ship house was completed in December 1813 and continued in use for the next four decades.

=== Board of Navy Commissioners ===
Hull then served on the Board of Navy Commissioners for the years 1815–1817 in Washington D.C. The law creating the Board gave it authority over procurement of naval stores, supplies and material as these related to the construction of naval vessels, outfitting of ships, armament and equipment plus oversight authority over naval shipyards, stations and drydocks. The BNC also regulated civilian employment and pay. Serving with Hull on the Board were Commodores David Porter and John Rodgers. The BNC found all current yards to have shortcomings. One of the most important recommendations the BNC made was that only Portsmouth and Boston Navy Yard were suitable for the building of large ships in all seasons. Though the BNC recommended Washington Navy Yard be retained, its report noted, "The Yard at Washington, when viewed as building yard only, would be less objectionable [than Baltimore] were the navigation deeper and the obstructions fewer. But it is the decided opinion of the Board, that the obstructions and its distance from the sea render it unsuitable for every other purpose." The Board recommended Baltimore, Norfolk and Charleston navy yards be closed. These recommendations were controversial and became the subject of considerable partisanship, with only Baltimore and Charleston eventually phased out of existence. The BNC final report was in fact, highly critical of the Washington Navy Yard and its business practices. Writing on 11 May 1815 to Commodore Thomas Tingey, the BNC stated, "The Board are about contracting for the repairs of the Black Smith shop in the Navy Yard under your command for the purpose of employing workmen to put in order for service & a state of preservation ... It is the intention of the Board of the Navy Commissioners, to reestablish the Navy Yard at this place, as a building Yard only, & while stating to you this intention, it may not be improper for them to make you acquainted with their views generally with respect to the establishment. They have witnessed in many of our Navy Yards & this particularly pressure in the employment of characters unsuited for the public service – maimed & unmanageable slaves for the accommodation of distressed widows & orphans & indigent families – apprentices for the accommodation of their masters – & old men & children for the benefit of their families & parents. These practices must cease – none must be employed but for the advantage of the public, & this Yard instead of rendering the navy odious to the nation from the scenes of want & extravagance which it has too long exhibited must serve as a model on which to prefect a general system of economy. In making to you,- Sir, these remarks the Navy Commissioners are aware that you have with themselves long witnessed the evils of which they complain, & which every countenance will be given to assist you in remedying them, they calculate with confidence on a disposition on your part to forward the public interests." Later in his career when Commodore Hull assumed command of the Washington Navy Yard (1829–1835), he attempted to right these alleged wrongs and implement necessary change.

=== Charlestown Navy Yard ===
At Charlestown Navy Yard, known as Boston Navy Yard, Hull's tenure as commandant was marred and hindered by his lack of familiarity with the administration of a large shore installation, the management of the civilian workforce and by the moves to dislodge him by some of his senior and junior naval officers. A number of these officers and senior civilians made public accusations questioning Hull's command. In view of the serious nature of their charges a Naval Court of Inquiry met in Charlestown during August 1822 to consider the accusations brought against Hull. On 15 October 1822 the court found Hull had acted properly and within his scope of authority and in his official duties had been "correct and meritorious." Nevertheless, the court cautioned Hull regarding placing his personal property in public stores and the employment of navy yard mechanics and laborers for private purposes. But the bitterness of the affair never really left Hull for as he wrote "This yard is much improved and in fine order for whoever may take it. I am tired of this kind of life and particularly of this place, and have nothing but constant quarrels with the Charleston people." During 1823–1827, he commanded the Pacific Squadron operating out of South America aboard USS United States.

=== Washington Navy Yard ===
Commodore Hull's next assignment was as Commandant of the Washington Navy Yard (WNY), 1829–1835. The Washington Navy Yard, station log, recorded that Hull "assumed command on Saturday 11 April 1829 at 11.00 with a thirteen gun salute." During Hull's five year tenure, shipbuilding on the Potomac River dramatically fell as the yard built just one naval vessel; the aptly named and ill-fated schooner, USS Experiment. As early as 1815 the Navy Department had decided the shallowness of the Anacostia River channel made Washington DC less than an ideal port and consequently approved the shift to ordnance production. Shipwrights and carpenters, the elite trades of the wooden–hulled navy, felt especially threatened as the navy yard focused on metal trades manufacturing and proved extremely reluctant to abandon their time-honored practices. On taking command Hull was mindful of the Board of Navy Commissioners' 1815 critical report and attempted to fix the problems the BNC noted.

Hull's new command however once again involved managing a large and restless workforce, but at WNY one composed of white civilian mechanics, laborers and enslaved and free blacks. At WNY he quickly discovered a violation of navy regulations; the employment of slaves by naval yard officers. When ordered to discharge all slaves in the anchor shop, though, he protested to the Board of Navy Commissioners "I fear we could not find a set of men white or black, or even slaves ... to now do in the anchor shop." "Competition for jobs on the navy yard was constant ... white workers feared that competition from enslaved and even free blacks dragged down the wage scale."

Hull was often conflicted in matters of race. When newly arrived in Washington DC he had purchased an enslaved black man John Ambler, from a fellow officer for his "servant", yet when leaving the navy yard, he manumitted Ambler on 17 October 1835 and later intervened to get Ambler a discharge from a naval vessel. African American diarist Michael Shiner on the other hand remembered Hull fondly for his assistance in securing the release of his wife and children from a slave dealer. Shiner wrote "i am under Great oblagation to Comodore isaac Hull for the time my Wife wher Sold to george he had command of the washington navy yard foer his kindness to me"

Hull's taciturn management style quickly aroused the resentment of his white workforce. After his arrival Hull had made efforts to check what he perceived as the unwarranted independence of some of his senior civilian managers, to improve the unkempt appearance of navy yard grounds and control the loss of government property. Hull's strict management combined with long simmering disputes over pay, working hours and the employment of blacks quickly came to a head the summer of 1835.

==== WNY Strike of 1835 ====
A labor strike which began on 29 July 1835 was a response to Hull's orders limiting the workers' lunch period and what they were allowed to bring on the navy yard. After Hull's hard experience with the Boston inquiry, he was particularly sensitive to any hint of misappropriation. When he learned of alleged thefts of government property, he promptly issued an order limiting workers' lunch privileges, and in response, the workers went on strike. Hull was aware that his workers were ostensibly striking over more than his newly imposed restrictions. He speculated that "the mechanics have been acted on by other causes," Hull was concerned that the ten-hour day movement and the Board of Navy Commissioners resistance to reducing the workweek was the actual cause of the strike, and that the calls for general strike that summer by the Philadelphia shipyard workers had found an attentive audience. To Hull's chagrin the strikers were encouraged by Naval Constructor William Doughty to hold out for higher wages. The workers felt Hull often treated them with "silent contempt" which was probably the result of his deafness." In Hull's report to the Secretary of the Navy, Mahlon Dickerson, he stated that 175 white mechanics and workers had joined the strike. Their walkout also immediately exposed longstanding racial discord in the Yard. The strike quickly morphed into the infamous Snow Riot as many angry white workers now out of employment took out their resentments on the black community, their anger fanned by the false rumor that free black restaurant owner Beverley Snow had disparaged their wives. Josephine Seaton, the wife of the publisher of the National Intelligencer, William Seaton, expressed alarm in a letter regarding the strike and riot: "Snow will certainly be torn to pieces by the mechanics if he be caught, and they are in full pursuit of him. Unfortunately, several hundred mechanics of the navy yard are out of employment, who, aided and abetted by their sympathizers, create the mob, ... and it is truly alarming." As the riot spread the city government became alarmed, the strikers had sent a delegation to President Andrew Jackson, who was sympathetic, pleading their case for his intervention and referring to Commodore Hull's order as "despotic".

The strike and subsequent riot after nearly two weeks left the navy yard workers with no pay and collapsing public support. A mediator Dr. Alexander A. McWilliams was brought into arrange a compromise, wherein the strikers after withdrawing their charges against Hull were allowed to return to work. The strike officially ended on Saturday August 15, 1835 and the workers returned to the Yard that Saturday morning. Although Hull and the mechanics attempted to smooth over their differences by noting they derived from "a misunderstanding", both parties had lost much in the course of the strike. The workers, though allowed to return to their jobs, had lost financially. Most importantly for the workers, the strike revealed the weakness and tenuous nature of their bargaining situation. As per diem labor in a protracted dispute, and absent effective organization, they inevitably suffered. The strike also revealed the corrosive effects of racism on the workforce as white workers sought to blame their own precarious economic situation on free and enslaved African Americans. Further, the strike left as part of its legacy a deep and abiding racial mistrust, which would linger. For the next century, the history of the strike and subsequent race riot remained an embarrassment to be glossed over and disassociated from the Washington Navy Yard's official history. Hull too received an object lesson in the limits of power; he could order but could not compel. The whole event left Hull offended deeply by the strikers' conduct and to some degree by the strong suggestion of the Secretary of the Navy Dickerson to accept the mediated compromise. On 10 September 1835 Isaac Hull requested and received a year's leave of absence. He never returned to Washington Navy Yard.

=== Command of USS Ohio and European Squadron ===
From 1839 to 1841 Commodore Hull was in command of USS Ohio the flagship and the European squadron. The European squadron included the frigate USS Brandywine and sloops-of-war USS Preble and USS Cyane.

== Death and legacy ==
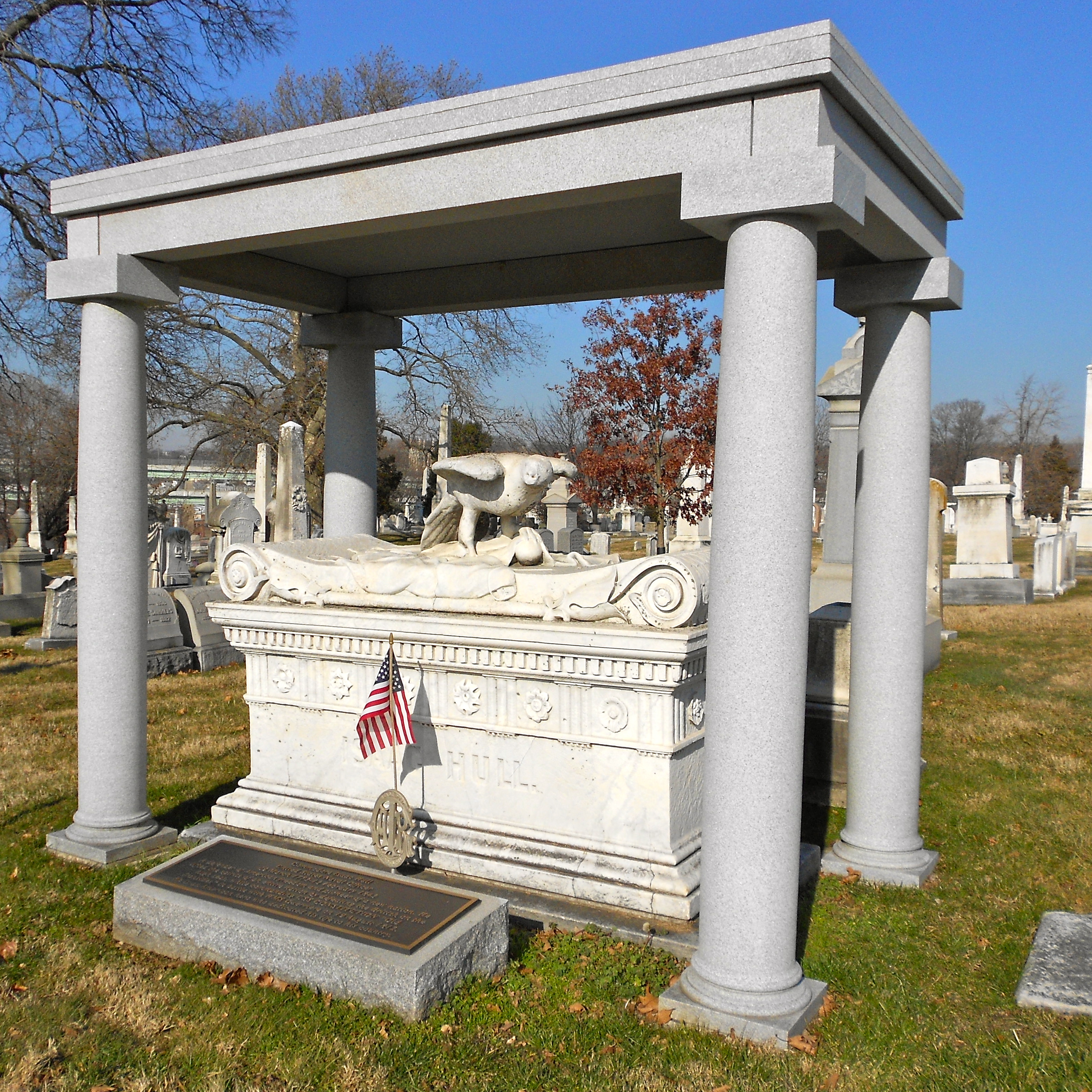
Isaac Hull grave in Laurel Hill Cemetery

Rendered unfit for further service by age and ill health, he spent the next two years on leave. Commodore Isaac Hull died at the age of 69 in Philadelphia, Pennsylvania and was interred in Laurel Hill Cemetery.

The U.S. Navy named five ships in honor of Isaac Hull, including: USS Commodore Hull, USS Hull (DD-7), USS Hull (DD-330), USS Hull (DD-350), and USS Hull (DD-945).

The Commodore Isaac Hull Memorial Bridge spanning the Housatonic River between Derby and Shelton is named after him.

Hull Avenue in the Bronx, New York is named in honor of Hull.

Hull Street in Richmond, Virginia is named in honor of Hull.

Hull Street in Montgomery, Alabama is named in honor of Hull. It runs parallel to streets named after other Barbary War/War of 1812 naval heroes.

Fort Hull, a fort built along the Federal Road during the Creek War, was named in honor of Hull.

Hull Street in Savannah, Georgia, is also named for him.

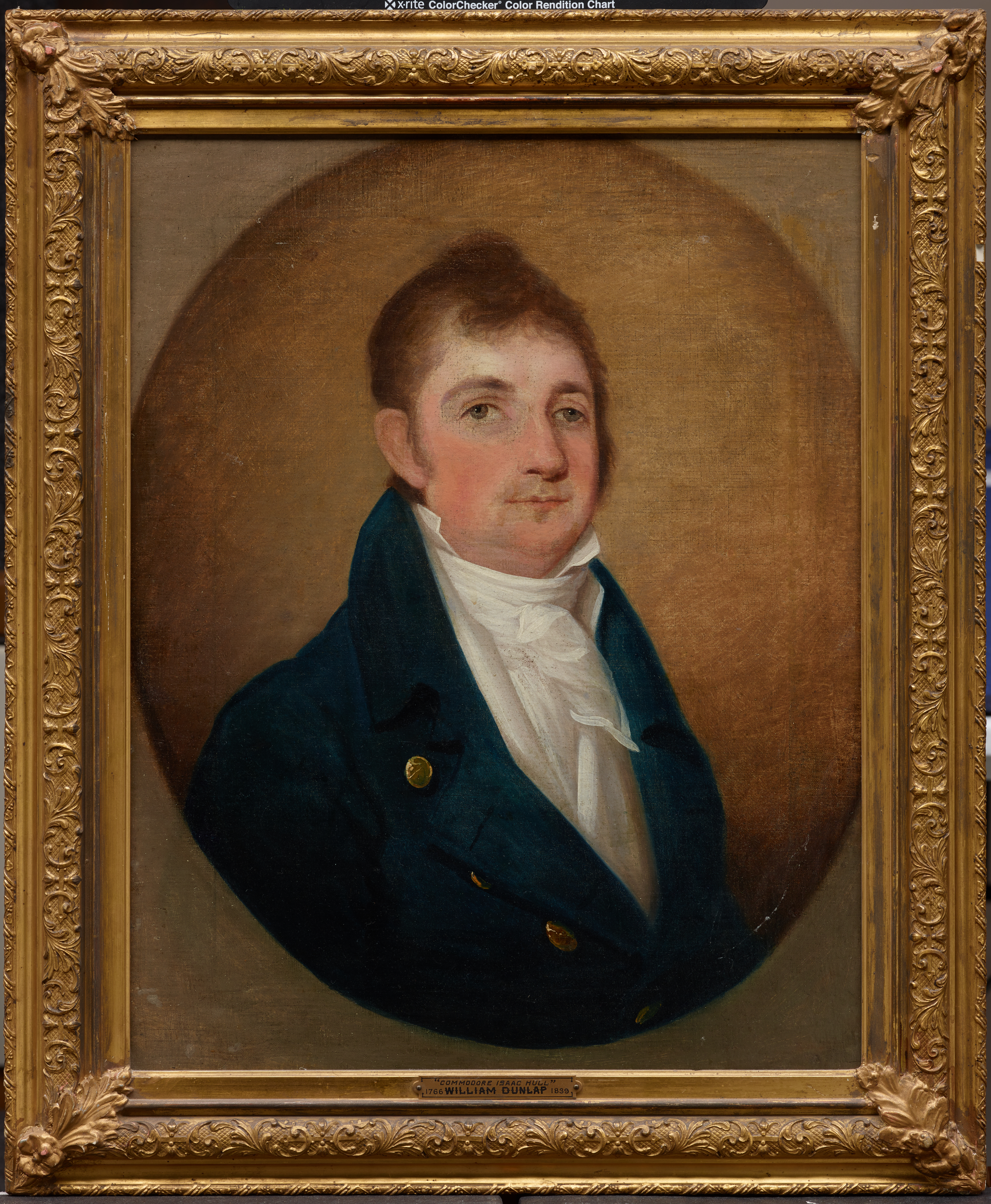
Commodore Isaac Hull, by William Dunlap, in the Dallas Museum of Art

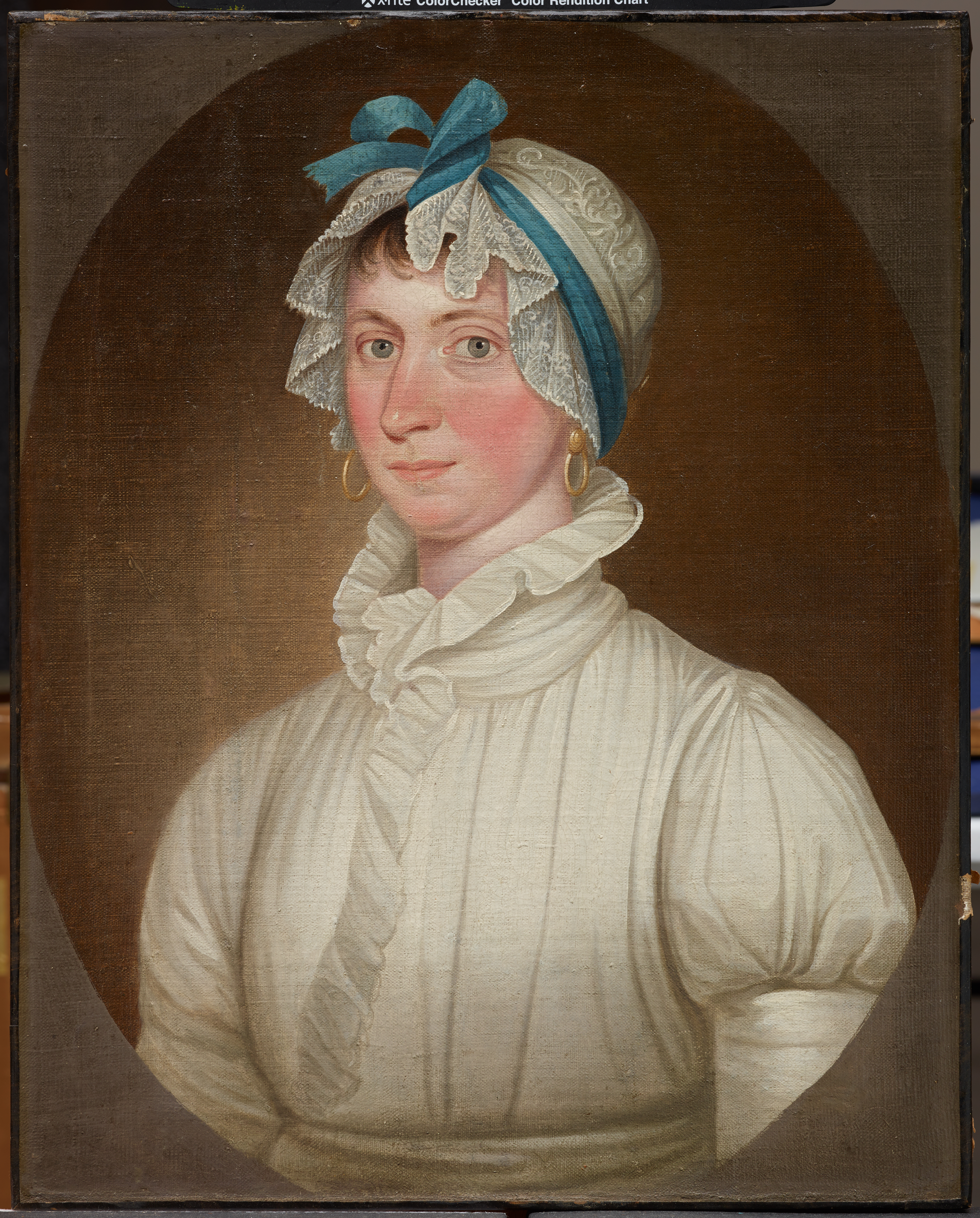
Anna Hart, Mrs. Isaac Hull, by William Dunlap, in the Dallas Museum of Art

== See also ==
- 1835 Washington Navy Yard labor strike
- Bibliography of early American naval history
- List of ships

== Sources ==
- Allen, Gardner Weld (2010). P: Commodore Hull: Papers of Isaac Hull, Commodore United States Navy. Kessinger Publishing. p. 372. ISBN 978-1164507208.
- Brodine, Charles E, Crawford, Michael, and Hughes, Christine (2007). Ironsides!: The Ship, the Men and the Wars of the USS Constitution. Fireship Press. ISBN 9781934757147.
- Dickon, Chris (2008). The enduring journey of the USS Chesapeake: ... The Hickory Press, Charleston, SC. p. 157. ISBN 9781596292987. Url
- Enz, David Fitz Enz (2009). Old Ironsides: Eagle of the Sea: The Story of the USS Constitution. Taylor Trade Publications. p. 304. ISBN 978-1589794276. Url
- Grant, Bruce (1947). Isaac Hull, Captain of Old Ironsides: the life and fighting times of Isaac Hull and the U.S. frigate Constitution. Pellegrini and Cudahy; Original from the University of Michigan. p. 416. Url
- Hollis, Ira Nelson (1901). The frigate Constitution: the central figure of the Navy under sail. Houghton, Mifflin and Company, Boston, New York. p. 263. Url
- Hoehne, Patrick, Rereading the Riot Acts: Race, Labor, and the Washington, D.C. Snow Riot of 1835, Riots Acts, 2021, https://www.riotacts.org/stories/snowriot.html
- Martin, Tyrone G. (2003). A Most Fortunate Ship: A Narrative History of Old Ironsides. Naval Institute Press. p. 421. ISBN 1591145139. Url
- Maloney, Linda M. (1986). The Captain from Connecticut: The Life and Naval Times of Isaac Hull. Northeastern University Press. p. 549. ISBN 0930350790. Url
- Molloy, Leo Thomas (1964). Commodore Isaac Hull, U.S.N., his life and times. Hull Book Fund. p. 244. Url
- Marquardt, Karl Heinz (2005). The 44-Gun Frigate USS Constitution: "Old Ironsides". Naval Institute Press. p. 128. ISBN 1591142504. Url
- Paine, Ralph Delahaye (2010) [1920]. The fight for a free sea: a chronicle of the War of 1812. Yale University Press, New Haven, 1920. p. 235. ISBN 978-1-59114-362-8. Url
- Peck, Taylor Round–shot to Rockets: A History of the Washington Navy Yard and U.S. Naval Gun Factory (Annapolis: United States Naval Institute, 1949), pp 263–264
- Schroeder, John H. Commodore John Rodgers Paragon of the Early American Navy University of Florida Press: Gaisnville, 2006.
- Sharp, John G. History of the Washington Navy Yard Civilian Workforce 1799–1962 Vindolanda Press: Stockton 2005, https://www.history.navy.mil/content/dam/nhhc/browse-by-topic/heritage/washington-navy-yard/pdfs/WNY_History.pdf
- Sharp, John G. M., The Washington Navy Yard Strike and "Snow Riot" of 1835, http://www.usgwarchives.net/va/portsmouth/shipyard/sharptoc/washingtonsy.html
- Sharp John G., The Diary of Michael Shiner Relating to the History of the Washington Navy Yard 1813–1869 Naval History and Heritage Command, 2015 https://www.history.navy.mil/research/library/online-reading-room/title-list-alphabetically/d/diary-of-michael-shiner.html
- Washington Navy Yard Station Log Entries November 1822-December 1889, Naval History and Heritage Command, Sharp, John G., editor, https://www.history.navy.mil/research/library/online-reading-room/title-list-alphabetically/w/washington-navy-yard-station-log-november-1822-march-1830-extracts.html
- Stevens, Benjamin F (2010). Isaac Hull and American Frigate Constitution. BiblioBazaar (reprint). p. 24. ISBN 978-1172140664. Url
