= Pres =

Pres may refer to:

== Abbreviations ==
- President
- Pressure
- Presbyterian
- Pres, glossing abbreviation for the present tense

== Acronyms ==
- Posterior reversible encephalopathy syndrome (PRES)
- French centers for research and higher education (Pôles de recherche et d'enseignement supérieur)

== People ==
- "Pres" or "Prez", nickname for American jazz tenor saxophonist Lester Young (1909–1959)
- J. Presper Eckert (1919–1995) American electrical engineer and computer pioneer
- Pres Nimes Ekwona (born 1948), Nauruan politician
- Presnell Pres Mull (1922–2005), American college football player and head coach
- Priscillano Pres Romanillos (1963–2010), Hollywood animator
- Preston Pres Slack (1908–1993), American National Basketball Association player

== Other uses ==
- Pres Dillard, male lead character in the 1938 film Jezebel, played by Henry Fonda
- Presentation Brothers College, Cork, colloquially known as Pres

== See also ==
- Les Prés, a commune in France
- Terrence Des Pres (1939–1987), American writer and Holocaust scholar
- Josette du Pres, a fictional character in the TV series Dark Shadows
- Leo du Pres, a fictional character in the soap opera All My Children
- Prez (disambiguation)
