= Der Präsident =

Der Präsident is German for "The President." It may refer to:

- The President (1928 film), a 1928 silent German film
- The President (play), a 1975 German-language play by Thomas Bernhard

== See also ==
- President
