= Waleed Al-Husseini =

Palestinian essayist and writer

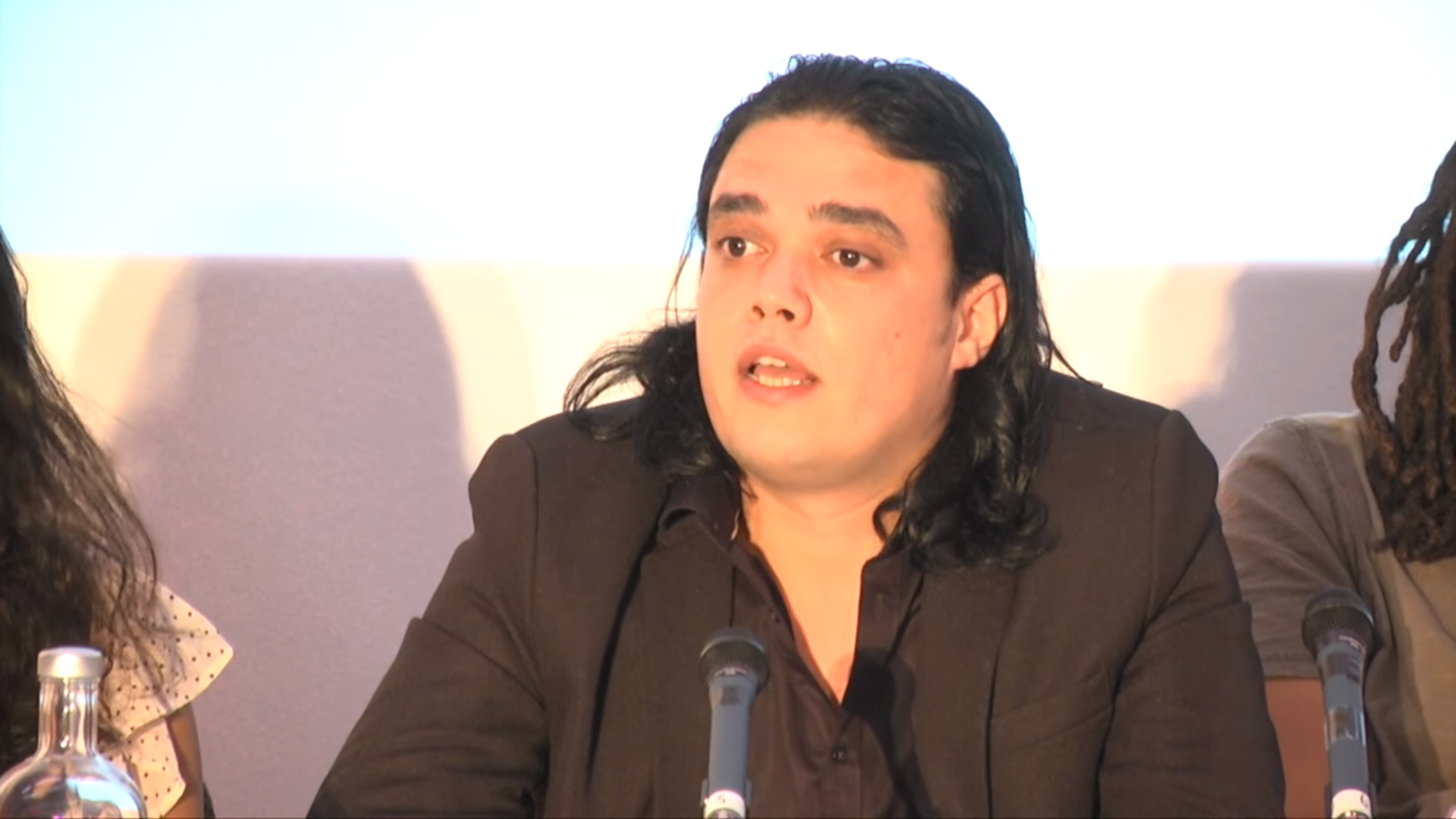
- Al-Husseini at the International Conference on Free Expression and Conscience 2017
- Born: June 25, 1989 (age 37); Qalqilya, West Bank
- Occupations: writer, essayist, author, activist
- Known for: His arrest by the Palestinian Authority for allegedly blaspheming against Islam Writer, Secular Humanist, Founder of Council of Ex-Muslims of France

Waleed Al-Husseini or Walid Husayin (Arabic: وليد الحسيني; born June 25, 1989) is a Palestinian atheist, secularist essayist, writer, blogger, ex-Muslim and founder of the Council of Ex-Muslims of France. Born and raised in Qalqilya in the West Bank, he has been living in France since 2012.

Al-Husseini, who published material satirizing religion on the Internet, was arrested in October 2010 by the Palestinian Authority for allegedly blaspheming against Islam on Facebook and in blog posts. His arrest garnered international attention, and Al-Husseini said he was tortured during his time in prison. After being released, Al-Husseini, fearing for his personal safety, sought asylum in France, which was granted to him in 2012. Since then, he has spoken in favor of secularism and against the development of radical and political Islam in France and abroad, arguing that radical Islam poses a threat to the secular French Republic.

The New York Times wrote that "The case has drawn attention to thorny issues like freedom of expression in the Palestinian Authority, for which insulting religion is considered illegal, and the cultural collision between a conservative society and the Internet."

== Biography ==
Waleed Al-Husseini, born June 25, 1989, is from the West Bank city of Qalqilyah. As a university student, he studied computer science but remained unemployed and instead helped out a few hours a day at his father's one-chair barber shop. Acquaintances described him as an "ordinary guy" who regularly prayed at the mosque on Fridays.

The Qalqilyah resident also spent much of his time on the Internet. After his mother discovered articles on atheism on his computer, she canceled his Internet connection, hoping he would reject such views. Instead, he began frequenting a local Internet café where he spent up to seven hours a day in a corner booth.

=== Blogging and Facebook activities ===
Allegedly writing under the pseudonym "Waleed Al-Husseini" in Facebook and on his personal blog, Al-Husseini, according to The New York Times, "angered the Muslim cyberworld by promoting atheism, composing spoofs of Koranic verses, skewering the lifestyle of the Prophet Muhammad and chatting online using the sarcastic Web name God Almighty."

In an essay entitled "Why I Left Islam" on his blog Noor al-Aqel ("Enlightenment of Reason"), Waleed Al-Husseini wrote that Muslims "believe anyone who leaves Islam is an agent or a spy for a Western State, namely the Jewish State ... They actually don't get that people are free to think and believe in whatever suits them." Husayin emphasized that he was not implying that Christianity or Judaism were better than Islam, and that in his opinion, all religions were "a bunch of mind-blowing legends and a pile of nonsense that compete with each other in terms of stupidity". Husayin rejected claims that Islam was a religion of tolerance, equality, and social justice. He also criticized Islam's treatment of women, its suppression of human creativity, and the allegations that the Koran contained scientific miracles. The Facebook groups he allegedly created elicited hundreds of angry comments, death threats, and the formation of more than a dozen Facebook groups against him. At its peak, Husayin's Arabic-language blog had more than 70,000 visitors. He also posted English language translations of his essays in the blog "Proud Atheist."

=== Arrest and imprisonment ===
Al-Husseini tells his story (19:02) at the International Conference on Free Expression and Conscience 2017.

Waleed Al-Husseini spent several months at the Qalqilyah Internet café. The café's owner, Ahmed Abu Asab, found his activities suspicious: "Sometimes he was in here until after midnight for over eight hours a day, always sitting in the corner. He was very secretive. He never wanted you to see his screen." Using software to check on what his client was doing, Abu Asab discovered Husayin's Facebook writings critical of religion. Abu Asab said he and three friends knew of Husayin's actions and that "maybe somebody" informed the authorities.

After Palestinian Authority (PA) intelligence was tipped off, intelligence officials monitored him for several weeks. On October 31, 2010, Waleed Al-Husseini was arrested as he sat in the café. In November 2010, the Ma'an News Agency filed the first report on the arrest of the "controversial blogger whose postings on Facebook had infuriated Muslims."

The PA did not give any explanation as to why Waleed Al-Husseini has been arrested. According to a Palestinian human rights expert, if Husayen would be tried, it would be according to a 1960 Jordanian law against defaming religion which is still in force in the West Bank. Tayseer Tamimi, the former chief Islamic judge in the area, said that Husayin is the first person to be arrested in the West Bank for their religious views.

==== Reactions to imprisonment ====
Waleed Al-Husseini's family disowned his actions. His father, Khaled, said this his son was in treatment and had been "bewitched" by a Tunisian woman he had met via Facebook. According to Husayen's cousins, his mother wants him to be sentenced to life in prison, both to restore the family's honor and to protect her son from vigilantes.

In conservative Qalqilyah, there appears to be universal criticism of his actions and at least one call for his death. One 35-year-old resident said "he should be burned to death" in public "to be an example to others." A lawyer with Al Haq, a Ramallah-based human rights organization said, " I respect Mr Waleed Al-Husseini's right to have these beliefs but he also has to respect the law, there are limits to freedom of speech." He said that Waleed Al-Husseini probably faces a sentence of between three months and three years for the offence.

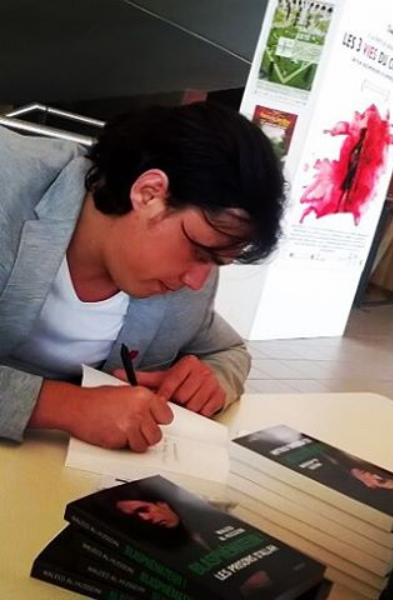
Waleed Al-Husseini in 2015

Internationally, Al-Husseini's cause won support abroad with a Facebook group and several online petitions forming in solidarity. The Jordan-based Arabic-speaking Irreligious Coalition was one organization to circulate a petition calling for his release. Human Rights Watch (HRW) has called for Husayen's release. Joe Stork, deputy Middle East director at HRW, stated, "The Palestinian judiciary should demonstrate its integrity by protecting the right to free expression and ordering Hasayen's release and his safety." The French foreign ministry has expressed concern over his arrest, stating, "France is concerned by the risks of damage to fundamental freedoms and in particular the freedom of expression, contained in the 'crime of blasphemy.'"

In the Wall Street Journal, columnist Bret Stephens wrote that "if Palestinians cannot abide a single free-thinker in their midst, they cannot be free in any meaningful sense of the word. And if the U.S. can't speak up on his behalf, then neither, in the long run, can we." In regards to the case, a Los Angeles Times editorial questioned, "Will the new [Palestinian] country move toward fundamentalist values and Islamic law, as many followers of Hamas would like, or will it opt to be a more open, democratic society?"

Diaa Hadid of the Associated Press notes that the "Western-backed Palestinian Authority is among the more religiously liberal Arab governments in the region. It is dominated by secular elites and has frequently cracked down on hardline Muslims and activists connected to its conservative Islamic rival, Hamas." Hadid suggests that the anger toward Walid "reflects the feeling in the Muslim world that their faith is under mounting attack in the West". According to the Palestinian Ma'an news agency, while secular political beliefs are "not uncommon" in Palestinian society, "the expression of views seen as hostile to the dominant religions is viewed by many as incitement rather than free speech."

==== December 2010 apology ====
In early December 2010, Waleed Al-Husseini posted a letter to his family on his blog in which he apologized for offending Muslims and sought forgiveness for what he called his "stupidity". A friend, who spoke anonymously because of the sensitivity of the issue, said Husayen posted the letter in hopes of winning release from prison. Al-Husseini states in his 2015 autobiography Blasphémateur he did not write it, but discovered it on leaving custody and reaccessing the Internet to find out what people had been writing about him during his imprisonment. "I came across my blog, also, and I was sickened to see that the only left on it was a statement by the Palestinian Authority, in my name, excusing myself and as asking for forgiveness for having blasphemed Islam. Five years of work and over two million visitors had vanished".

In December 2010, a Palestinian security source said Waleed Al-Husseini would continue to be kept in jail for his own protection: "It is impossible to release him because we are afraid he will be killed by his family." Human Rights Watch has urged the PA to release or charge him, citing that holding him without charge for more than 72 hours violates Palestinian law.

After ten months of imprisonment, Husayn was released on bail, but was sometimes arrested and held by PA security agents for days at a time. During one of those times, he was tortured. PA security officials also smashed his two computers and demanded he stop posting his views on the Internet.

=== Escape to France ===
According to Al-Husseini, for months after he was released, he was harassed by PA security forces and sometimes detained without charge, and received numerous death threats. Fearing for his life, he took an emotional leave from his siblings and aunt and from his parents who he says did not understand his atheism but still supported him as their son. Having discovered that France had exerted some diplomatic pressure on his behalf, which he believes may have led to him being released from prison pending trial, he decided to seek asylum there. He left the West Bank for Jordan, obtained a visa from the French embassy there, and moved to Paris, where he applied for asylum. In his autobiography, Al-Husseini states he later found he was sentenced to seven-and-a-half years in prison in his absence.

=== Life in asylum ===
==== Creating the Council of Ex-Muslims of France ====
Logo of the CEMF

On 6 July 2013, Waleed Al-Husseini and around 30 other former Muslims founded the Council of Ex-Muslims of France (CEMF). The Council presents itself as "composed of atheists, free thinkers, humanists and ex -Muslims who take a stand to promote reason, universal rights and secularism." He opposes "any discrimination and all abuse" that would justify "respect for religion" requires "freedom to criticize religions" and "the prohibition of customs, rules, ceremonies or religious activities that are incompatible with or violate the rights and freedoms of the people." It also boasts "the prohibition of any cultural or religious practice that hinders or opposes the autonomy of women, their will and equality." The CEMF condemns "any interference by any authority, family or parental or official authorities in the private lives of women and men in their emotional and sexual relationships, and sexuality". A Facebook page was devoted to the activity of CEMF. In this regard, Waleed Al-Husseini was interviewed by journalist Caroline Fourest at France Inter on the radio programme Ils changent le monde (They change the world).

==== Advocating secularism ====
In early 2015, while preparing the release of his autobiography in the midst of a series of Islamist terrorist attacks in Paris, Al-Husseini made several appearances on French talk shows and news programs, and wrote an opinion piece on the need to reform Islam which was published on the website of daily newspaper Le Monde. He was also the subject of a four-page piece in French news magazine Marianne. In January, he published his autobiography, Blasphémateur ! : les prisons d'Allah (which was translated in English in 2017 as The Blasphemer: The Price I Paid for Rejecting Islam) writing about how he came to reject Islam through his studies of Islamic literature and history, and recounting his blogging, his arrest (alleging that he was tortured in prison) and subsequent flight to France. In his media appearances and book he makes calls in favor of the French principles of secularism and states his belief that there must be more debate on what he considers to be the violent content of parts of the Islamic texts, especially in the wake of the massacres at Charlie Hebdo magazine and the Jewish Hyper Casher supermarket in Paris in early 2015.

In 2016, Al-Husseini was in Denmark taking part in a debate about "Islam and Atheism" where he and other ex-Muslims debated the consequences of apostasy from Islam, and during the debate-conference it was necessary to have some heavily armed police guarding due to threats from religious Muslims. In this context, Al-Husseini stated that when he arrived in France he expected to live a normal life without problem as an atheist being in a European country, but it has not been the case since he and other ex-Muslims have been persecuted by other Muslims even in Europe.

As a refugee in France, Al-Husseini spoke publicly in favor of secularism, laïcité, freedom of conscience and speech, especially the right to criticize religion. He has become increasingly critical of the political and intellectual milieu in his host country; in 2017, he published his second book, Une trahison française : Les collaborationnistes de l'islam radical devoilés ("A French Treason: The Collaborators of Radical Islam Unveiled") where he argued that "many politicians" and "intellectuals" in France had "betrayed" the ideals of the secular French Republic over the last decades, accusing them of being "collaborators" who have played in favor of "radical Islam" out of desire to get Muslims' votes and/or adherence to "Third-Worldism".

== Controversies ==
In the late 2010s, Al-Husseini was accused in the French press of spreading misinformation or fake news through social media, notably on the topic of Islam. One such instance involved a Twitter post illustrated by a picture of women wearing veils and large, loose-fit Islamic dresses (jilbāb) which Al-Husseini alleged was taken in the streets of Roubaix in northern France, while it was in fact taken in Tunisia.

== Bibliography ==
Maryam Namazie interviews Al-Husseini about Blasphémateur (2016).

- Blasphémateur ! : les prisons d'Allah, 2015, Grasset (ISBN 978-2-246-85461-6)
  - English translation: Al-Husseini, Waleed (2017). The Blasphemer: The Price I Paid for Rejecting Islam. New York City: Skyhorse Publishing. ISBN 9781628726756.
- Une trahison française : Les collaborationnistes de l'islam radical devoilés ("A French Treason: The Collaborators of Radical Islam Unveiled"), 2017, Éditions Ring ISBN 979-1091447577

== See also ==
- Freedom of religion in the Palestinian territories
- Human rights in the State of Palestine
