= Christianity in Asia =

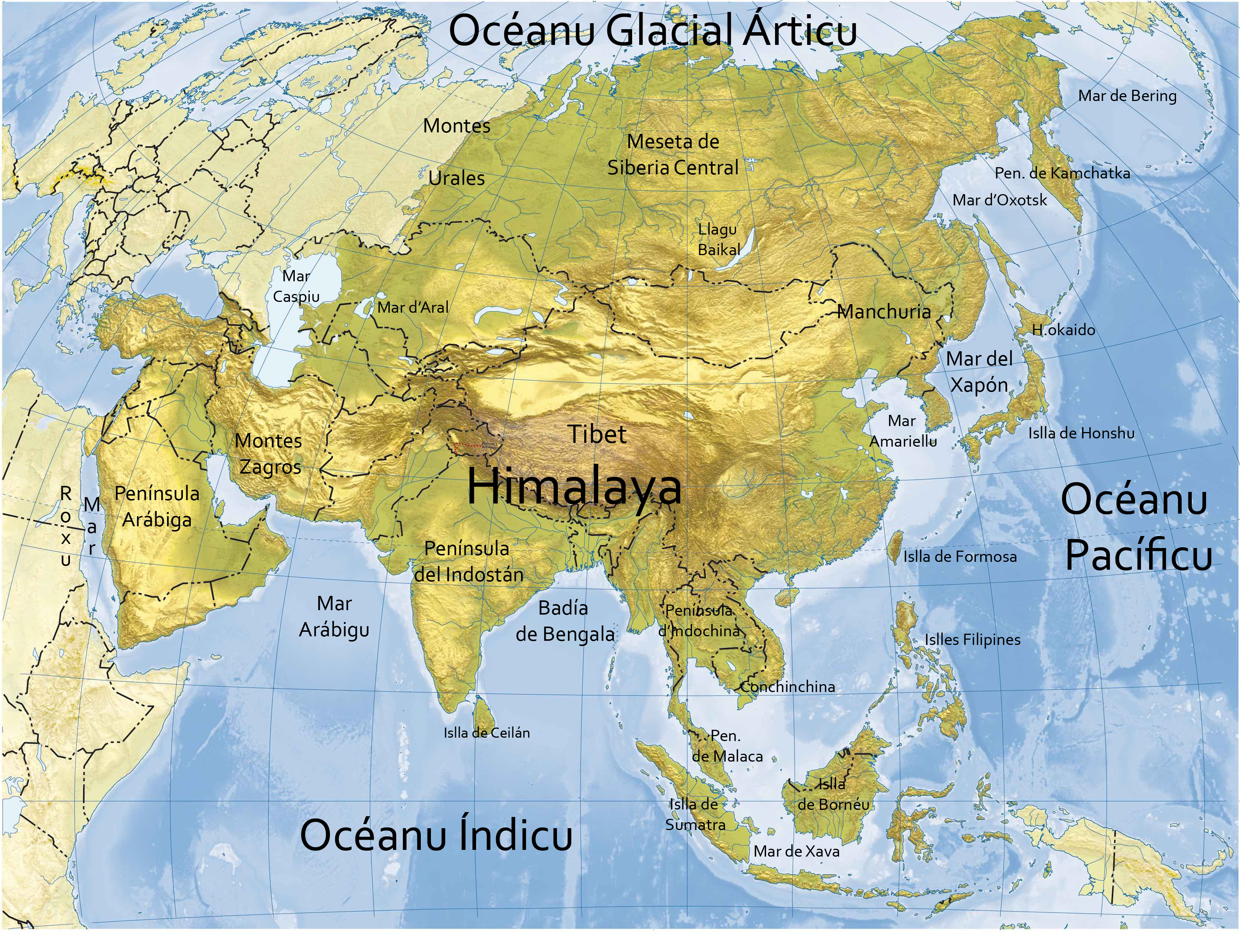
Christianity spread from West Asia to China between the 1st to the 14th century AD, and further to East Asia from the 16th century with the European Age of Discovery

Christianity in Asia has its roots in the very inception of Christianity, which originated from the life and teachings of Jesus in 1st-century Roman Judea. Christianity then spread through the missionary work of his apostles, first in the Levant and taking roots in the major cities such as Jerusalem and Antioch. According to tradition, further eastward expansion occurred via the preaching of Thomas the Apostle, who established Christianity in the Parthian Empire (Iran) and India. The very First Ecumenical Council was held in the city of Nicaea in Asia Minor (325). The first nations to adopt Christianity as a state religion were Armenia in 301 and Georgia in 327. By the 4th century, Christianity became the dominant religion in all Asian provinces of the Eastern Roman Empire.

After the First Council of Ephesus in 431 and the Nestorian Schism, the Nestorian Christianity developed. Nestorians began converting Mongols around the 7th century, and Nestorian Christianity was probably introduced into China during the Tang dynasty (618–907). Mongols tended to be tolerant of multiple religions, with several Mongol tribes being primarily Christian, and under the leadership of Genghis Khan's grandson, the great khan Möngke, Christianity was a small religious influence of the Mongol Empire in the 13th century.

The Fourth Ecumenical Council was held in Asian city of Chalcedon (451). Christological controversies and disputes that surrounded the Council and its aftermath gradually resulted in division between pro-Chalcedonian (Eastern Orthodox) and anti-Chalcedonian (Oriental Orthodox) Christianity.

At the late 12th and 13th centuries, there was some effort to reunite Eastern and Western Christianity. There were also numerous missionary efforts from Europe to Asia, primarily by Franciscan, Dominican, or Jesuit missionaries. In the 16th century, Spain began to convert Filipinos. In the 18th century, Catholicism developed more or less independently in Korea.

At present, Christianity continues to be the majority religion in the Philippines, East Timor, Armenia, Georgia, Cyprus and Russia. It has significant minority populations in South Korea, Taiwan, China, India, Pakistan, Iran, Indonesia, Vietnam, Singapore, Hong Kong, Japan, Malaysia, Kazakhstan, Kyrgyzstan, Israel, Palestine (including the West Bank and the Gaza Strip), Lebanon, Syria, Iraq, Jordan, and several other countries in Asia with a total Christian population of more than 295 million.

Although Eastern Christianity is commonly practiced in Asia, Roman Catholicism also features prominently, with the Philippines having the world's third-largest Roman Catholic population.

== Early spread in Asia ==
Spread of Christianity to Asia, 1st century.

As of 2021, there are nearly 383 million Christians in Asia.

=== West Asia ===
==== Levant ====
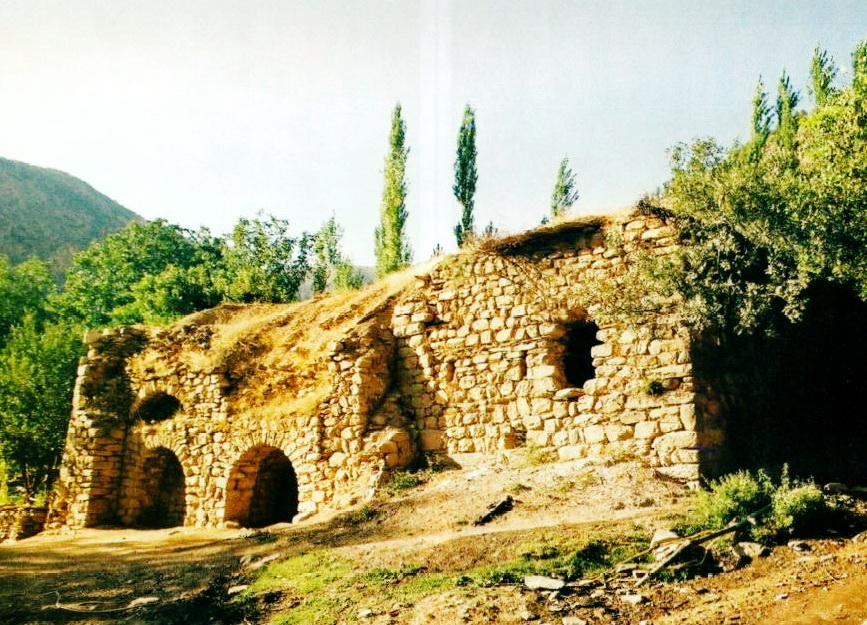
A 6th-century Nestorian church, St. John the Arab, in the Assyrian village of Geramon.

Christianity spread through the Levant (Eastern Mediterranean) from the 1st century AD. One of the key centers of Christianity became the city of Antioch, previous capital of the Hellenistic Seleucid Empire, located in today what is modern Turkey. Antioch was evangelized perhaps by Peter the Apostle, according to the tradition upon which the Antiochene patriarchate still rests its claim for primacy, and certainly by Barnabas and Paul. Its converts were the first to be called Christians. They multiplied rapidly, and by the time of Theodosius (347–395) were reckoned by Chrysostom (347–407), Archbishop of Constantinople, at about 100,000 people. Between 252 and 300, ten assemblies of the church were held at Antioch and it became the seat of one of the original five patriarchates, along with Jerusalem, Alexandria, Constantinople, and Rome.

==== Caucasus ====
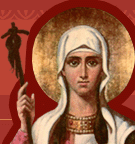
Saint Nino (290–338) is credited with establishing Christianity as a state religion in Georgia.

Armenia and Georgia were the first nations to adopt Christianity as a state religion, in 301 and 326 respectively.

Christianity had been preached in Armenia by two of Jesus' twelve apostles — Thaddaeus and Bartholomew — between 40–60 AD. Because of these two founding apostles, the Armenian Apostolic Church is considered to be the world's oldest national church. In Georgia, Christianity was first preached by the apostles Simon and Andrew in the first century. It became the state religion of Kartli, Iberia (the area of Georgia's capital) in 326. The conversion of Georgia to Christianity is credited to the efforts of Saint Nino of Cappadocia (290–338).

==== Parthian Empire ====
Christianity further spread eastward under the Parthian Empire, which displayed a high tolerance of religious matters. According to tradition, Christian proselytism in Central Asia, starting with Mesopotamia and the Iranian plateau, was put under the responsibility of Saint Thomas the Apostle, and started in the first century AD. Saint Thomas is also credited with the establishment of Christianity in India. The Christians of Mesopotamia and Iran were organized under several bishops, and were present at the First Council of Nicaea in 325 AD.

=== Central Asia ===
The spread of Christianity in Central Asia seems to have been facilitated by the great diffusion of Greek in the region (Seleucid Empire, Greco-Bactrian Kingdom, Indo-Greek Kingdom), as well as Aramaic, the language of Jesus Christ. The spread of the Jews in Asia since the deportation from Babylon and the capture of Jerusalem by Titus also seems to have been a contributing factor.

The earliest known references to Christian communities in Central Asia is from a writing by Bar Daisan around 196 AD: "Nor do our sisters among the Gilanians and Bactrians have any intercourse with strangers".

The Sasanians also proved rather tolerant of the Christian faith until the persecution by the Zoroastrian priest Kartir under Bahram II (276–93 AD). Further persecutions seem to have taken place under Shapur II (310–379) and Yazdegerd II (438–457), with events in 338 having brought significant damage to the faith.

=== South Asia ===
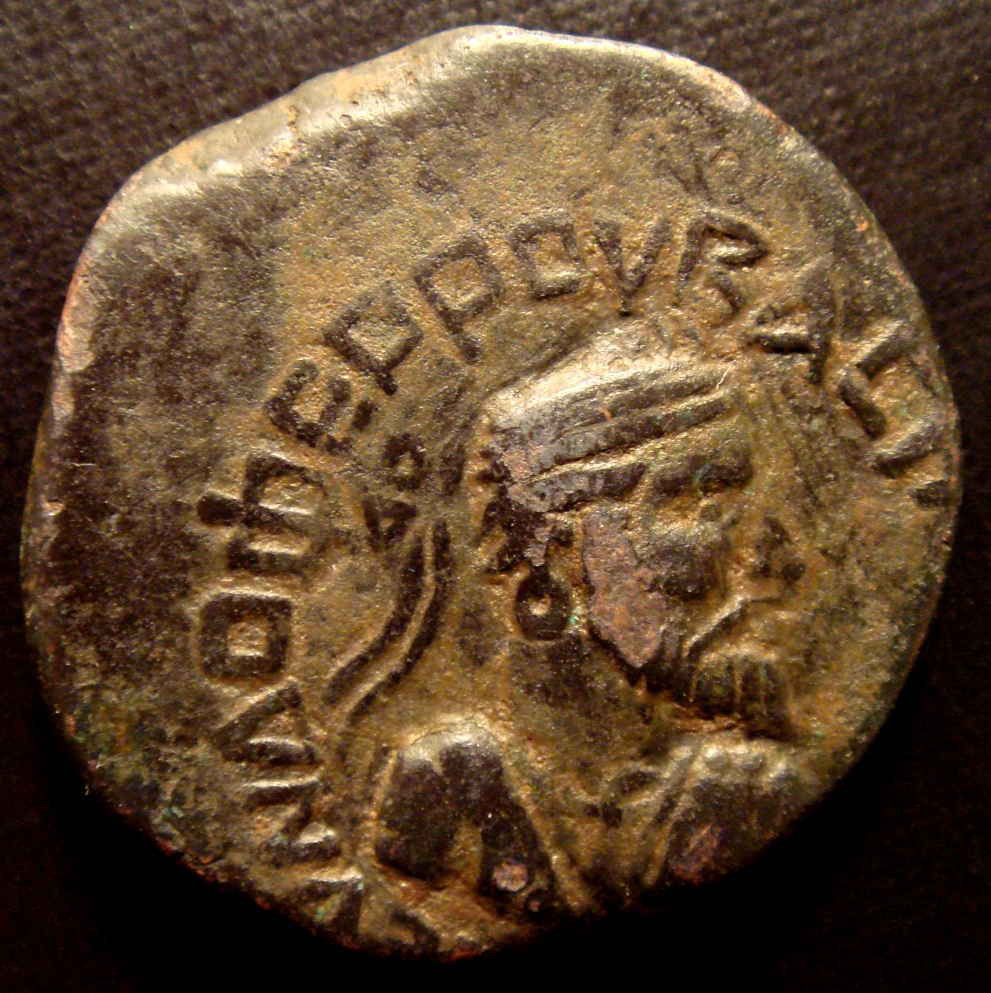
According to tradition, the Indo-Parthian king Gondophares was proselytized by St Thomas, who continued on to southern India, and possibly as far as Malaysia or China.

According to Eusebius' record, the apostles Thomas and Bartholomew were assigned to Parthia (modern Iran) and India. By the time of the establishment of the Second Persian Empire (AD 226), there were bishops of the Church of the East in northwest India, Afghanistan and Baluchistan (including parts of Iran, Afghanistan, and Pakistan), with laymen and clergy alike engaging in missionary activity.

An early third-century Syriac work known as the Acts of Thomas connects the apostle's Indian ministry with two kings, one in the north and the other in the south. According to the Acts, Thomas was at first reluctant to accept this mission, but the Lord appeared to him in a night vision and compelled him to accompany an Indian merchant, Abbanes (or Habban), to his native place in northwest India. There, Thomas found himself in the service of the Indo-Parthian king, Gondophares. The Apostle's ministry resulted in many conversions throughout the kingdom, including the king and his brother.

Thomas thereafter went south to Kerala and baptized the natives, whose descendants form the Saint Thomas Christians or the Syrian Malabar Nasranis.

Piecing together the various traditions, the story suggests that Thomas left northwest India when invasion threatened, and traveled by vessel to the Malabar Coast along the southwestern coast of the Indian continent, possibly visiting southeast Arabia and Socotra en route, and landing at the former flourishing port of Muziris on an island near Cochin in 52. From there he preached the gospel throughout the Malabar Coast. The various Churches he founded were located mainly on the Periyar River and its tributaries and along the coast. He preached to all classes of people and had about 170 converts, including members of the four principal castes. Later, stone crosses were erected at the places where churches were founded, and they became pilgrimage centres. In accordance with apostolic custom, Thomas ordained teachers and leaders or elders, who were reported to be the earliest ministry of the Malabar church.

Thomas next proceeded overland to the Coromandel Coast in southeastern India, and ministered in what is now the Madras area, where a local King and many people were converted. One tradition related that he went from there to China via Malacca in Malaysia, and after spending some time there, returned to the Madras area. Apparently his renewed ministry outraged the Brahmins, who were fearful lest Christianity undermine their social caste system. So according to the Syriac version of the Acts of Thomas, Mazdai, the local king at Mylapore, after questioning the Apostle condemned him to death about the year AD 72. Anxious to avoid popular excitement, the King ordered Thomas conducted to a nearby mountain, where, after being allowed to pray, he was then stoned and stabbed to death with a lance wielded by an angry Brahmin.

==== Sri Lanka ====
Christianity was introduced to Sri Lanka in the 1st century (72 AD), possibly after the apostle Thomas' visit to India. The Anuradhapura cross is an ancient recorded symbol of Christianity in the island. Oriental Orthodoxy was the majority branch of Christianity before the arrival of the Portuguese. Catholicism was introduced by the Portuguese invasion of Ceylon in the 16th century. With the Dutch colonial period seeing a percentage of church members in excess of 10–20%.

== Expansion of Nestorian Christianity (431–1360 AD) ==
In 410, the Sasanian emperor summoned the Persian church leaders to the Synod of Seleucia. His purpose was to make the Catholicos of Seleucia-Ctesiphon the minority leader of the Christians and personally responsible for their good conduct throughout the empire. The synod accepted the emperor's wish.

In 424, the bishops of Persia met in council under the leadership of Catholicos Dadiso and determined that there would be no reference of their disciplinary or theological problems to any other power, especially not to any church council in the Roman Empire. The formal separation from the See of Antioch and the western Syrian Church under the Roman (Byzantine) Emperors, occurred at this synod in 424.

=== Nestorianism ===
The eastern development of Christianity continued to separate from the west, pushed along by such events as 431's Council of Ephesus, in which the Syrian bishop Nestorius, Patriarch of Constantinople since 428, was accused of heresy for preaching his brand of Christianity, labelled Nestorianism after him. He and his followers were banished from the Byzantine Empire, and other religious and political institutions gave him sanctuary. Eastern Christianity seceded to form the Church of the East, though some historians refer to it with the catchall term Nestorian Church despite the fact that many eastern Christians were not following the doctrine preached by Nestorius.

=== Expansion to Sogdiana and eastern Central Asia ===
Proselytism, combined with sporadic Sassanian persecutions and the exiling of Christian communities in their own area, caused the spread of Christianity to the east.

The Edict of Milan in 313, granted Christianity toleration by the Roman Empire. After Emperor Constantine's conversion to Christianity, the indigenous Christians of Persia were considered a political threat to the Sassanians. They exiled Christian communities to the east, such as a community of Orthodox Melkites who were installed in Romagyri near Tashkent, or a community of Jacobites, who were sent to Yarkand in the Xinjiang at the doorstep of China. The Hephthalites are known to have been open somewhat to Christianity since 498, and they requested the Nestorian Catholicos to establish a diocesan bishop in their lands in 549.

By 650, there were 20 Nestorian dioceses east of the Oxus river. The development of Islam in the late 7th century further cut off Asian Christianity from the Western Christians, but eastern expansion of the faith continued nonetheless. Relations with Islam were good enough for the Catholicos to leave Seleucia-Ctesiphon to set up his seat in Baghdad upon the establishment of the Abbasids in 750.

From the 7th century onward, the nomadic Turks of Central Asia started to convert to Nestorian Christianity. Mass conversions are recorded in 781−2 and later in 1007, when 200,000 Turks and Mongols reportedly became Christians. The Turkish Kipchaks are also known to have converted to Christianity at the suggestion of the Georgians as they allied in their conflicts against the Muslims. A great number were baptized at the request of the Georgian king David II. From 1120, there was a Kipchak national Christian church and an influential clergy.

=== Early Christianity in China ===
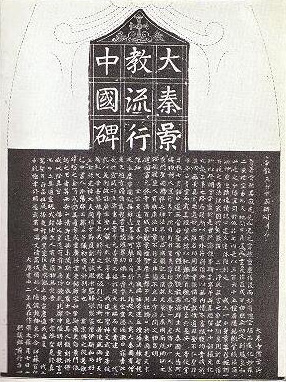
The Nestorian Stele in China, erected in 781. The title is: 大秦景教流行中國碑 "Stele of the propagation of the luminous Roman faith in China"

Christianity may have existed earlier in China, but the first documented introduction was during the Tang dynasty (618–907) A Christian mission under the leadership of the priest Alopen (described variously as Persian, Syriac, or Nestorian) was known to have arrived in 635, where he and his followers received an Imperial Edict allowing for the establishment of a church. In China, the religion was known as the Luminous Religion of the Romans (大秦景教 Dàqín Jǐngjiào). "Daqin" was a Chinese term used to mean Rome and the Near East, though from the Western view, Nestorian Christianity was considered heretical by the Latin Christians.

Opposition arose to the Christians in 698–699 from the Buddhists, and then from the Daoists in 713, but Christianity continued to thrive, and in 781, a stone stele (the Nestorian Stele) was erected at the Tang capital of Chang'an, which recorded 150 years of Emperor-supported Christian history in China. The text of the stele describes flourishing communities of Christians throughout China, but beyond this and few other fragmentary records, relatively little is known of their history. In later years, other emperors were not as religiously tolerant. In 845, the Chinese authorities implemented an interdiction of foreign cults, and Christianity diminished in China until the time of the Mongol Empire in the 13th century.

=== Christianity among the Mongols ===
Overall, Mongols were highly tolerant of most religions, and typically sponsored several at the same time. They had been proselytized by Nestorian Christians since about the 7th century, and several Mongol tribes, such as the Kerait, Naimans, Merkit, and to a large extent the Kara Khitan (who practiced it side by side with Buddhism), were also Christian.

The founder of the Mongol Empire, Genghis Khan (1162–1227) was a shamanist, but showed great tolerance to other religions. His sons were married to Christian princesses of the Kerait clan, such as Sorghaghtani Beki and Doquz Khatan, a remarkable Kerait noblewoman, the granddaughter of Toghrul Khan and a passionate Christian who held considerable influence at the court of the Khan. She made no secret of her dislike of Islam and her eagerness to help Christians of every sect.

Under the rule of Genghis's grandson Möngke Khan (1205–1259), son of Sorghaghtani, the main religious influence was that of the Christians, to whom Möngke showed special favour in memory of his mother.

== East–West rapprochement ==
Following the East–West Schism of 1054, various efforts, over several centuries, were made at reuniting eastern and western Christianity, with the objective of putting both under the rule of the Pope.

=== Armenian Church ===
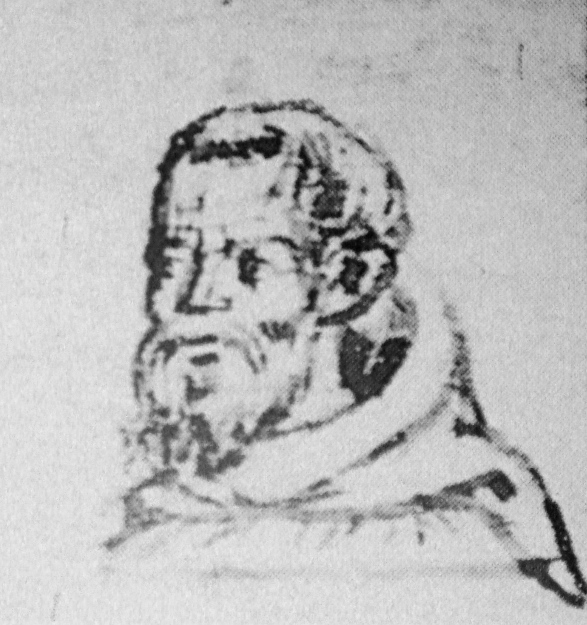
The Armenian king Hetoum II, as a Franciscan friar

In 1198, a Union was proclaimed between Rome and the Armenian Church by the Armenian catholicos of Sis, Grigor VI Apirat. This was not followed in deeds however, as the local clergy and populace was strongly opposed to such a union. Again in 1441, the Armenian Catholicos of Sis Grigor IX Musabekiants proclaimed the union of the Armenian and Latin churches at the Council of Florence, but this was countered by an Armenian schism under Kirakos I Virapetsi, which installed the Catholicos see at Edjmiatzin, and marginalized Sis.

Numerous Catholic missions were also sent to Cilician Armenia to help with rapprochement. The Franciscans were put in charge of these missions. William of Rubruck visited Cilicia in 1254, and John of Monte Corvino in 1288. The Armenian king Hethoum II (1266–1307) would himself become a Franciscan friar upon his multiple abdications. Another such monk was the historian Nerses Balients, who was a member of the "Unitarian" movement advocating unification with the Latin Church.

=== Byzantine Church ===
Various efforts were also made by the Byzantine Church to unite with Rome. In 1272, John of Montecorvino was commissioned by the Byzantine emperor Michael VIII Palaiologos to communicate with Pope Gregory X, to negotiate for the reunion of the Orthodox and Catholic Churches. The objective was to drive a wedge between the pope and supporters of the Latin Empire, who had views on reconquering Constantinople. A tenuous union between the Greek and Latin churches was signed at the Second Council of Lyons in 1274. Michael VIII's concession was met with determined opposition at home, and prisons filled with many opponents to the union. At the same time the unionist controversy helped drive Byzantium's Orthodox neighbors Serbia and Bulgaria into the camp of Michael VIII's opponents. For a while the diplomatic intent of the union worked out in the West, but in the end Pope Martin IV, an ally of Charles of Anjou, excommunicated Michael VIII.

== Catholic missions to the Mongols and China ==
Contacts between the Mongols and the West occurred in the 13th century, as the Mongol Empire expanded towards Europe and Palestine, coinciding with the latter part of the Crusades. Initial contacts showed that the Mongols had the impression that the Pope was the leader of the Europeans, and sent him messages insisting that he submit Europe to Mongol authority. In return, the Mongols stated that after they conquered Jerusalem, they would return it to the Crusaders. The various popes, for their part, seemed to be unaware that Christianity already existed in the East, and tended to respond with messages insisting that the Mongols convert to Christianity and accept baptism. Later communications between the Mongols and Europe saw attempts to form a Franco-Mongol alliance against the Muslims.

In 1253, King Louis IX sent the Franciscan William of Rubruck to the Mongol capital of Karakorum to convert the Tartars. William visited the court of the great khan Möngke in 1254, and observed representatives of several religions there. He engaged in a famous debate set up by Möngke, with representatives of each religion debating (unsuccessfully) which was best. He left in August 1254, bearing Möngke's reply to King Louis.

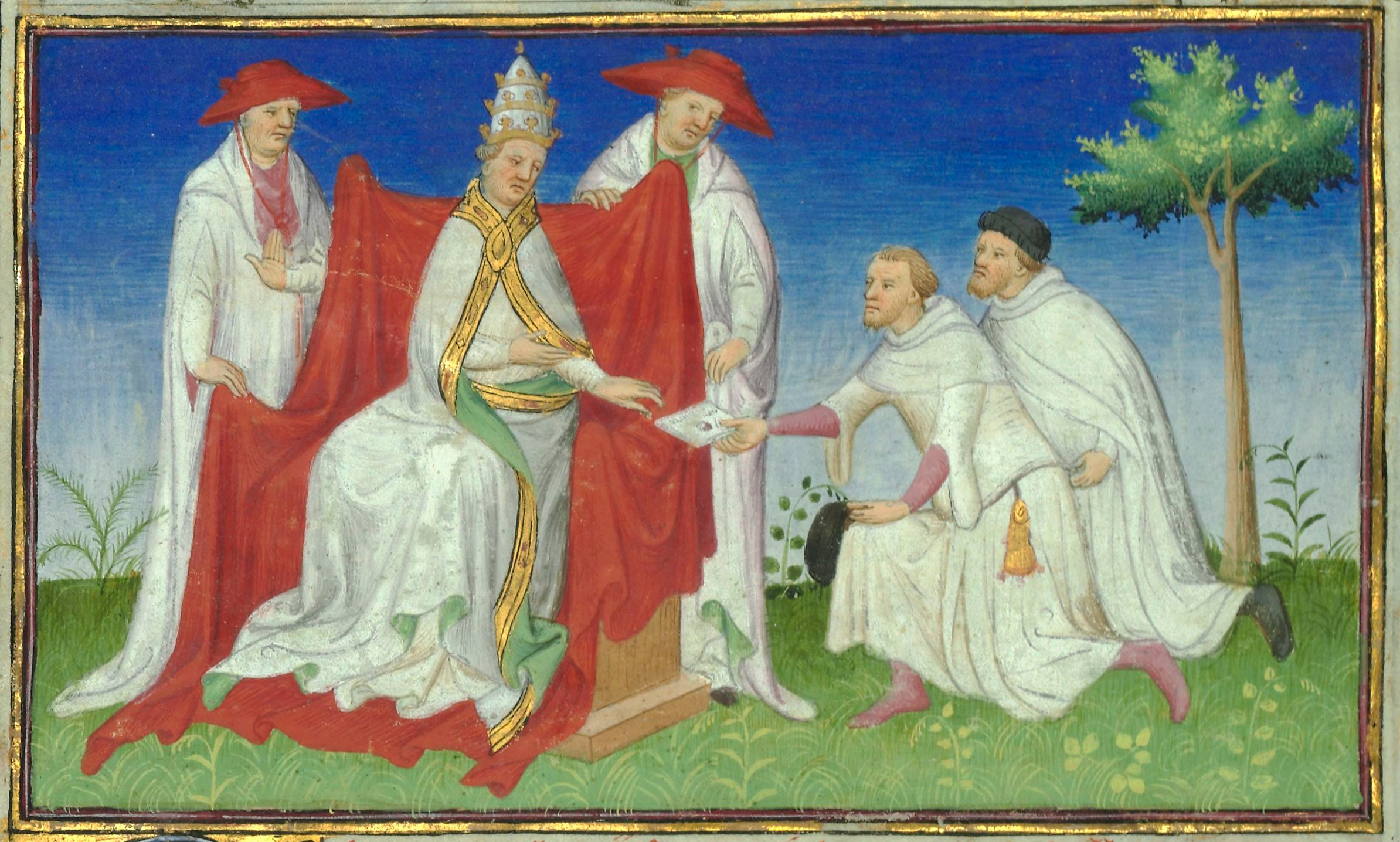
Niccolo and Maffeo Polo remitting a letter from Kublai Khan to Pope Gregory X in 1271.

In 1268, Marco Polo's father and uncle returned from China with an invitation from Kublai Khan to the pope, imploring him that a hundred teachers of science and religion be sent to reinforce the Christianity already present in Kublai's empire. However, this came to naught due to the hostility of influential Nestorian Christians within the largely Mongol court. Kublai did request Western assistance to secure Mongol rule over the Chinese Yuan dynasty. In 1289, Pope Nicholas IV sent the Franciscan John of Monte Corvino to China by way of India. Although Kublai had already died by the time John arrived in 1294, the court at Khanbaliq received him graciously and encouraged him to settle there. John was China's first Catholic missionary, and he was significantly successful. He laboured largely in the Mongol tongue, translated the New Testament and Psalms, built a central church, and within a few years (by 1305) could report 6,000 baptized converts. He also established a lay training school of 150 students. Other priests joined him, John was consecrated a bishop, and centers were established in the coastal provinces of Jiangsu (Yangzhou), Zhejiang (Hangzhou) and Fujian (Quanzhou, known to Europeans of the time as "Zaitun"). Under John's influence, many Mongols, such as those of the Ongut tribe, changed allegiance from the Eastern Nestorian (Syro-Oriental) Church, to Western Catholicism.

Following the death of Monte Corvino, an embassy to the French Pope Benedict XII in Avignon was sent by Toghun Temür in 1336, requesting a new spiritual guide. The pope replied by appointing four ecclesiastics as his legates to the khan's court. In 1338, a total of 50 ecclesiastics were sent by the Pope to Peking, such as John of Marignolli, who arrived in Khanbaliq in 1342, and stayed until 1347, then returning to Avignon in 1353.

However, the Mongol-established Yuan dynasty in China was in decline, and in 1368 was overthrown by the Ming dynasty founded by the native Chinese. The last Catholic bishop of Quanzhou, Giacomo da Firenze, was killed by the Chinese in 1362. By 1369 all Christians, whether Catholic or Nestorian (Syriac Orthodox, or Syro-Oriental), were expelled.

== European voyages of exploration ==
The European voyages of exploration in the 16th century would create new opportunities for Christian proselytism.

=== Christianity in the Philippines ===
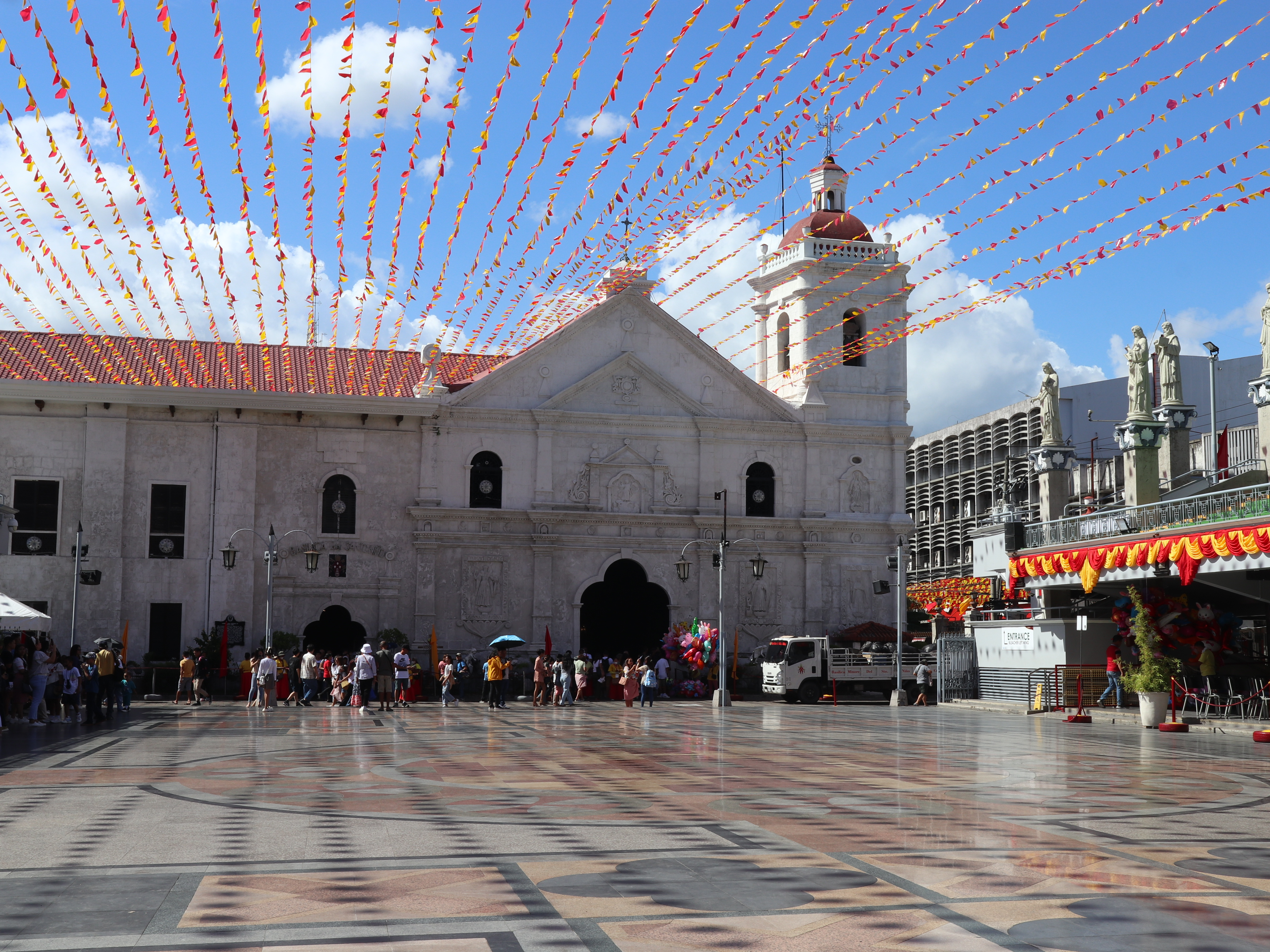
Basilica del Santo Niño, Cebu City

Ferdinand Magellan's arrival in Cebu represents the first attempt by Spain to convert natives to Christianity. According to a description of events, Magellan met with Raja Humabon of Cebu, who had an ill grandson whom the explorer, or one of his men, was able to help cure. Out of gratitude, Humabon and his chief consort allowed themselves to be christened "Carlos" and "Juana", with some 800 of his subjects also being baptised. Later, Lapulapu, the monarch of neighbouring Mactan Island, had his men kill Magellan and routed the ill-fated Spanish expedition.

In 1564, Luís de Velasco, the Viceroy of New Spain, sent the Basque explorer Miguel López de Legazpi to the Philippines. Legazpi's expedition, which included the Augustinian friar and circumnavigator Andrés de Urdaneta, erected what is now Cebu City under the patronage of the Holy Child, and later conquered the Kingdom of Maynila in 1571 and the neighbouring Kingdom of Tondo in 1589. The colonisers then proceeded to proselytise as they explored and subjugated the remaining parts of what is now the Philippines until 1898, with the exception of parts of Mindanao, which had been Muslim since at latest the 10th century CE, and the Cordilleras, where numerous mountain tribes maintained their ancient beliefs as they resisted Western colonisation until the arrival of the United States in the early 20th century.

=== Christianity in Indonesia ===
Catholic missionary Saint Francis Xavier, who is the first Christian missionary in Islands of Maluku in 16th century during Portuguese exploration around Asia.

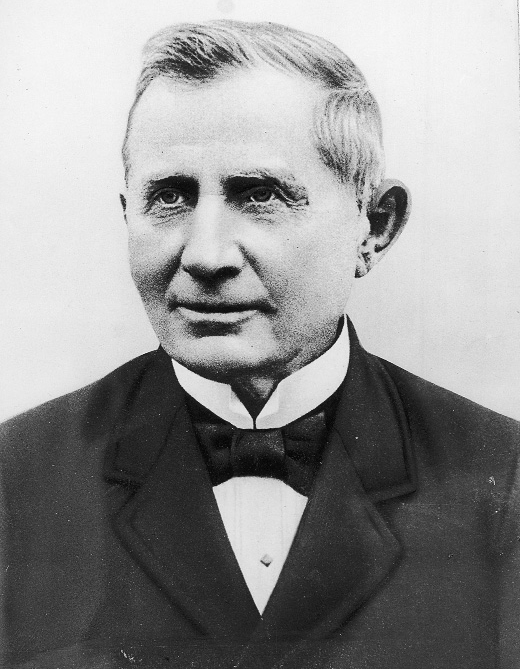
German-born Protestant Ludwig Ingwer Nommensen, which brought missionary project to Sumatra and who also translated the New Testament into the native Batak language

A 12th-century Christian Egyptian record of churches suggest that a church was established in Barus, on the west coast of North Sumatra, a trading post known to have been frequented by Indian traders, and therefore linked to the Indian Saint Thomas Christians.

The Portuguese arrived in the Malacca Sultanate (modern-day Malaysia) in 1509 seeking access to its wealth. Although initially well-received, the capture of Goa as well as other Muslim–Christian conflicts convinced the Malaccan Muslims that the Portuguese Christians would be a hostile presence. The resulting capture of Malacca is believed to have enhanced a sense of Muslim solidarity against the Christian Portuguese, and ongoing resistance against the Portuguese came from Muslim Aceh as well as from the Ottoman Empire. Although the Portuguese built some churches in Portuguese Malacca itself, their evangelical influence in neighbouring territories was perhaps more negative than positive in promulgating Christianity.

The first missionaries were sent by Stamford Raffles in 1824, at which time Sumatra was under temporary British rule. They observed that the Batak seemed receptive to new religious thought, and were likely to fall to the first mission, either Islamic or Christian, to attempt conversion.

A second mission that in 1834 of the American Board of Commissioners for Foreign Missions met with a brutal end when its two missionaries were killed by Batak resistant to outside interference in their traditional adat.

The first Christian community in North Sumatra was established in Sipirok, a community of (Batak) Angkola people. Three missionaries from an independent church in Ermelo, Netherlands arrived in 1857, and on 7 October 1861 one of the Ermelo missionaries united with the Rhenish Missionary Society, which had been recently expelled from Kalimantan as a result of the Banjarmasin War.

The mission was immensely successful, being well supported financially from Germany, and adopted effective evangelistic strategies led by Ludwig Ingwer Nommensen, who spent most of his life from 1862 until his death in 1918 in North Sumatra, successfully converting many among the Simalungun and Batak Toba as well as a minority of Angkola people.

=== Jesuits in China ===
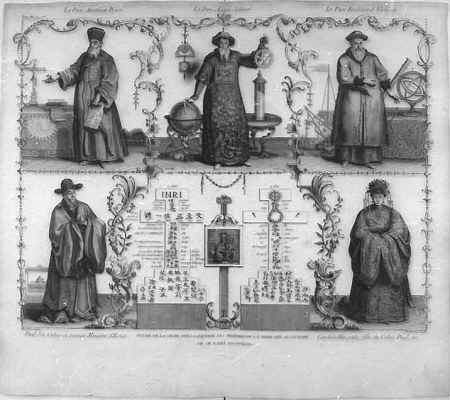
Jesuits in China

The missionary efforts and other work of the Society of Jesus, or Jesuits, between the 16th and 17th century played a significant role in continuing the transmission of knowledge, science, and culture between China and the West, and affected Christian culture in Chinese society today. Members of the Jesuit delegation to China were perhaps the most influential of the different Christian missionaries in that country between the earliest period of the religion up until the 19th century, when significant numbers of Catholic and Protestant missions developed. Prominent Jesuit missionaries included the Navarrese St. Francis Xavier, and the Italian Matteo Ricci. At the time of their peak influence, members of the Jesuit delegation were considered some of the emperor's most valued and trusted advisors, holding numerous prestigious posts in the imperial government. However, between the 18th and mid-19th century, nearly all Western missionaries in China were forced to conduct their teaching and other activities covertly.

== Independently formed Catholic movements in Korea ==
The history of Catholicism in Korea began in 1784 when Yi Sung-hun was baptized while in China under the Christian name of Peter. He later returned home with various religious texts and baptized many of his fellow countrymen. The Church in Korea survived without any formal missionary priests until clergy from France (the Paris Foreign Missions Society) arrived in 1836 for the ministry.

During the 19th century, the Catholic Church suffered persecution by the government of the Joseon dynasty, chiefly for the religion's refusal to carry out ancestral worship, which it perceived to be a form of idolatry, but which the State prescribed as a cornerstone of culture. A century-long persecution produced thousands of martyrs – 103 of whom were canonized by Pope John Paul II in May 1984, including the first Korean priest, St. Andrew Dae-gun Kim, who was ordained in 1845 and martyred in 1846. Despite the persecution, the Church in Korea expanded. The Apostolic Vicariate of Korea was formed in 1831, and after the expansion of Church structure for next century, the current structure of three Metropolitan Provinces each with an Archdiocese and several suffragan Dioceses was established in 1962.

Currently Deokwon (덕원) in North Korea is the See of the only territorial abbey outside Europe. The abbey was vacant for more than 50 years until Fr. Francis Ri was appointed as abbot in 2005. The abbey was never united with or changed into a diocese presumably due to the lack of effective church activity in the area since the division of Korea at the end of World War II.

== Christianity in Asia today ==
Today, Christianity is the predominant faith in six Asian countries, the Philippines, East Timor, Cyprus, Russia, Armenia and Georgia. In both conservative (the UAE) and moderately liberal (Malaysia and Indonesia) Muslim states, Christians continue to enjoy freedom of worship, despite limits on their ability to spread their faith.

A 2015 study estimates 6,968,500 Christian believers from a Muslim background in Asia, while about 483,500 Christian believers from a Muslim background in the Middle East, most of them belonging to some form of Protestantism.

=== Percentage and number of Christians per Asian country or territory ===
Country or region	Percentage Christians	Total population	Christian population	Dominant religious affiliation, percentage of total population
Armenia	98.7%	3,299,000	3,256,113	Armenian Apostolic Church
Timor-Leste	98%	1,108,777	1,086,601	Catholicism, 97%
Philippines	91.5%	109,035,343	92,746,021	Catholicism, 78.8%; Other Christian, 12.7%
Georgia	88.6%	4,636,400	4,107,850	Georgian Orthodox Church, 83.9%
Cyprus	79.3%	792,604	628,535	Cypriot Orthodox Church, 70%
Russia	73.6%	142,200,000	58,800,000–120,000,000	Russian Orthodox Church, 70%
Lebanon	41%	4,200,000	1,800,000	Shia Islam and Sunni Islam, each 27%
South Korea	31%	51,709,098	16,028,890	Irreligion, 51%
Kazakhstan	25%	16,536,000	4,134,000	Sunni Islam, 69%–70%
Singapore	19%	5,638,700	1,060,016	Buddhism (various sects), 31.1%
Kuwait	17.9%	4,621,638	837,87 (2020) (incl. between 259 – 400 Christian Kuwaiti citizens)	Sunni Islam, 70%
Kyrgyzstan	17%	5,587,443	949,865	Sunni Islam, 86.3%
Bahrain	14.5%	718,306	180,000 (incl. 1,000 Christian Bahraini citizens)	Shia Islam, 66–70%
Qatar	13.8%	928,635	240,000	Wahhabi Islam (Salafi Islam), 72.5%
United Arab Emirates	12.6%	4,621,399	940,000	Sunni Islam, 65% of residents, 85% of citizens
Hong Kong	11.7%	7,122,508	833,333	Irreligion, Confucianism, Buddhism, Taoism or Chinese folk religion, 57% – 80%
Indonesia	10.73%	282,477,584	30,277,477	Sunni Islam, 83%
Brunei	10%	381,371	40,000	Sunni Islam, 81%
Syria	10%	19,747,586	1,974,759	Sunni Islam, 74%
Malaysia	9.10%	33,938,222	3,091,000	Sunni Islam, 63%
Macau	9%	460,823	41,474	Irreligion, Mahayana Buddhism or Chinese folk religion, more than 75%
Turkmenistan	9%	4,997,503	449,775	Islam (mainly Sunni Islam), 89%
Uzbekistan	3%	28,128,600	2,531,574	Islam 90%
Vietnam	8.3%	95,500,000	7,926,500	Irreligion and Vietnamese folk religion (86%)
Sri Lanka	8%	21,128,773	1,690,302	Theravada Buddhism, 70%
Oman	4.3% – 6.5%	3,311,640	120,000 – 180,000	Ibadi Islam, 75%
Jordan	6%	6,198,677	371,921	Sunni Islam, 90%
Azerbaijan	4.8%	8,845,127	424,566	Shia Islam, 81%
Taiwan	4.5%	22,920,946	1,031,443	Buddhism (various sects), 35.1%
Myanmar (Burma)	6.2%	47,758,224	1,910,329	Theravada Buddhism, 89%
China	3% – 5%	1,322,044,605	39,661,338 – 67,070,000	Irreligion, 60% – 70%
Palestine	3%	4,277,000	128,310	Sunni Islam, 98%
India	2.3%	1,147,995,226	26,403,890	Hinduism, 79.8%
Mongolia	2.1%	2,996,082	62,918	Tibetan Buddhism, 53%
Israel	2%	7,112,359	161,000	Jewish (various sects), 75.4%
Japan	1.5%	123,342,000	1,872,320	Folk Shinto, Buddhism/Irreligion, 70% – 84%
North Korea	1.7%	25,368,620	431,266	Irreligion, 64.3%
Laos	1.5%	6,677,534	100,163	Theravada Buddhism, 67%
Pakistan	1.5%	167,762,049	2,516,431	Sunni Islam, 80% – 95%
Nepal	1.4%	29,535,000	413,900	Hinduism, 80.6%
Cambodia	1%	13,388,910	133,889	Theravada Buddhism, 95%
Tajikistan	1%	4,997,503	499,750	Sunni Islam, 93%
Bhutan	0.9%	682,321	12,255	Vajrayana Buddhism, 67% – 76%
Thailand	1.17%	65,493,298	787,589	Theravada Buddhism, 94.5%
Iran	0.4%	70,472,846	300,000	Shia Islam, 90% – 95%
Bangladesh	0.3%	153,546,901	460,641	Sunni Islam, 89.7%
Iraq	0.3%	46,523,657	~150,000	Shia Islam, 60%–65%
Turkey	0.2%	74,724,269	149,449 – 310,000	Sunni Islam, 70–80%
Yemen	0.17%	23,013,376	3,000 – 41,000	Sunni Islam, 53%
Afghanistan	0.02% – insignificant	32,738,775	500 – 8,000	Sunni Islam, 80% – 85%
Maldives	0% – insignificant	379,174	300 – 1,400	Sunni Islam, 100%
Saudi Arabia	0% – insignificant	23,513,330	expatriate Christians are around 1,200,000 (4.4%)	Sunni Islam, 85% – 90%

==== Table notes ====
Nations mentioned in the above list follow the list of countries and territories mentioned in the United Nations geoscheme for Asia. Areas which have not been recognised, such as Abkhazia, are not mentioned in this list. The data included in the table above are per sources in linked articles when available, and the CIA World Factbook when not. The number of Christians mentioned per country is the result of applying the percentages to the total population. These results will deviate from actual counts where they are available. The dominant religious affiliation per country mentions the dominant sect. In the case of Yemen for instance, Sunni Islam is shown as having 53% of the total population as followers. It does not mention that of the remaining 47% of the total population, 45% of the total population belongs to the Shia Islam sect.

a: The provided data are for the whole of Russia as no separate data are known for Asian Russia (Siberia)
b: Hong Kong and Macau are Special Administrative Regions (SAR) of China. Taiwan (officially the Republic of China) is a de facto state claimed by the PRC. Figures given for China do not include these areas.
c: Estimate, see Palestinian Christians#Demographics and denominations
d: Estimate, see Tajikistan#Religion
e: Islam is the official religion of the Maldives and open practice of any other religion is forbidden and liable to prosecution. Article nine of the revised constitution says that "a non-Muslim may not become a citizen".
f: Saudi Arabia allows Christians to enter the country as foreign workers for temporary work, but does not allow them to practice their faith openly.
g: Mainly non-citizens: expatriates
h: See Freedom of religion in the Palestinian territories
i: As no reliable percentages were found in the Wikipedia article Religion in Russia, this percentage is derived from the CIA World Factbook by subtracting the percentage of believers mentioned there from 100%
j: Prior to the 2003 invasion of Iraq, 1.5 million Christians (primarily Assyrians) lived in Iraq. Estimates of the current Christian population are hard to estimate, but it's known that there are less than 150,000 as of 2024. See Christianity in Iraq for more info.

== See also ==
- Christianity in the Middle East
- Chronology of European exploration of Asia
- List of Catholic dioceses of Asia
