= Prez =

Prez may refer to:

== Places ==
- Prez, Ardennes, France, a commune
- Prez, Switzerland, a municipality

== People ==
- Johnny Prez (born 1978), Jamaican reggaeton musician
- Lester Young (1909–1959), American jazz musician nicknamed "Prez" or "Pres"
- Pérez Prado (1916–1989), Cuban bandleader, mambo big band leader and percussionist nicknamed "Prez"

== Fictional characters ==
- Prez (character), several DC Comics characters
- Roland "Prez" Pryzbylewski, on The Wire

== See also ==
- Des Prez, a surname
- President (disambiguation)
