= Presidential =

Presidential may refer to:

- "Presidential" (song), a 2005 song by YoungBloodZ
- Presidential Airways (charter), an American charter airline based in Florida
- Presidential Airways (scheduled), an American passenger airline active in the 1980s
- Presidential Range, a range in the White Mountains of New Hampshire, US
- Presidential Range (Green Mountains), a mountain range in Vermont, US

== See also ==
- President (disambiguation)
