= The Blasphemer: The Price I Paid for Rejecting Islam =

- First edition
- Author: Waleed Al-Husseini
- Original title: Blasphémateur ! Les Prisons d'Allah
- Language: French
- Subject: Criticism of Islam, atheism
- Genre: Autobiography
- Publisher: Éditions Grasset & Fasquelle
- Publication date: 14 January 2015
- Publication place: France
- English publication date: 2017
- Media type: Print
- Pages: 160 (French original: 240)
- ISBN: 9781628726756
- Followed by: Une trahison française

The Blasphemer: The Price I Paid for Rejecting Islam (original French title: Blasphémateur ! : les prisons d'Allah, "Blasphemer! Allah's Prisons") is an autobiography by Waleed Al-Husseini, a Palestinian ex-Muslim atheist activist who was imprisoned for online blasphemy, after which he was released and fled to France. He originally wrote the book in Arabic. It was translated to French by Chawki Freiha and first published on 14 January 2015 by Éditions Grasset & Fasquelle, while the English translation was provided by Skyhorse Publishing in May 2017, and the Italian by Nessun Dogma in September 2018.

== Summary ==
The work recounts the life of Al-Husseini up to 2015 and was released just after the Charlie Hebdo shooting. He was born and raised in Qalqilya, Palestine in a Sunni Muslim family. The book focuses mainly on his journey from faith to atheism. Al-Husseini relates his experience from his first doubts, to the questioning of the precepts of Islam, the social stigma associated with loss of faith, from his activism on the Internet – through his blog "The Voice of Reason" – in the field of human rights and criticism of Islam until his work is discovered by the country's security service and he ends up in prison for insulting the state religion. The author says he never expected to be imprisoned for his online writings, but they became so widely read that the Palestinian authorities perceived him as a threat and had him arrested. During his detention, he suffers physical and psychological torture until, waiting for the final trial, he is eventually released on parole. He takes the opportunity to flee to France as a political refugee. After settling in the country, he becomes one of the co-founders of the Council of Ex-Muslims of France (CEMF).

== Quotations ==
"I am forever grateful to the Syrian politician and writer Randa Kassis who helped and advised me in many ways, I owe her everything she has done with me in France."

"The two main are: on the one hand, multiculturalism and on the other, equal rights policies for all individuals. The situation of Muslim prisoners was exemplary from this point of view because it allowed us to compare the French system of promoting equal rewards for all citizens of the republic irrespective of race or religion with the British tendency to favor the protection of minorities as a strategy for their integration into a society."

== See also ==
- Waleed Al-Husseini
- Apostasy in Islam
- List of former Muslims
