= Freedom of religion in Palestine =

Freedom of religion is the freedom to practice religion, change one's religion, mix religions, or to be irreligious. Religion in Palestine plays a strong role in society, including in the legal system and the educational system.

== Legal framework ==
The Palestinian Authority (PA) does not have a constitution; however, the Basic Law provides for religious freedom. The Basic Law was approved in 2002 by the Palestinian Legislative Council (PLC) and signed by then-President Yasser Arafat. The Basic Law states that Islam is the official religion but also calls for respect and sanctity for other divine religions (such as Judaism and Christianity).

The PA requires Palestinians to declare their religious affiliation on identification papers. Either Islamic or Christian ecclesiastical courts handle legal matters relating to personal status. Inheritance, marriage, and divorce are handled by such courts, which exist for Muslims and Christians.

The PA does not have a civil marriage law. Legally, members of one religious group mutually may agree to submit a personal status dispute to a different denomination to adjudicate, but in practice this did not occur. Churches that are not officially recognized by the PA must obtain special permission to perform marriages or adjudicate personal status matters; however, in practice churches that are not yet recognized advise their members to marry (or divorce) abroad.

Since Islam is the official religion of the PA, Islamic institutions and places of worship receive preferential treatment according to the US Department of State. In the West Bank and Gaza, the PA has a Ministry of Awqaf and Religious Affairs, which pays for the construction and maintenance of mosques and the salaries of many Palestinian imams. The Ministry also provides limited financial support to some Christian clergymen and Christian charitable organizations. The PA does not provide financial support to any Jewish institutions or holy sites in the West Bank since these areas are generally under Israeli control. The Government of Jordan maintains responsibility for Waqf institutions in Jerusalem.

The PA requires the teaching of religion in PA schools, with separate courses for Muslim and Christian students. A compulsory curriculum requires the study of Christianity for Christian students and Islam for Muslim students in grades one through six. The PA Ministry of Education and Higher Education (MOEHE) revised its primary and secondary school textbooks. A U.S. Government funded review of Palestinian textbooks concluded that the textbooks did not cross the line into incitement but continued to show elements of imbalance, bias, and inaccuracy. Critics noted the new textbooks often ignored historical Jewish connections to Israel and Jerusalem.

== Freedom of access to holy places ==
A particular source of conflict is the Haram al-Sharif. While East Jerusalem is under Israeli control, the site is administered by the Islamic Waqf, a Jordanian religious trust with ties to the PA. While Waqf has putative authority over the compound, including who may enter and what they may do, Israeli police control access to the compound. Waqf officials claim the exclusive right to approve visitation by non-Muslims, while per policy the Israeli Government opposes worship by non-Muslims.

Since 2000, the Waqf has banned non-Muslim entry to the Dome of the Rock and Al-Aqsa Mosque. Non-Muslim religious symbols may not be worn on the Temple Mount/Haram al-Sharif.

Israeli closure policies were found to affect freedom of religion, with tens of thousands of Palestinians unable to access places of worship in Jerusalem and the West Bank, including during religious holidays. The Israeli Government's closure policy prevented several Palestinian religious leaders, both Muslim and Christian, from reaching their congregations. Muslim and Christian clergy reported problems accessing religious sites in Jerusalem and Bethlehem. While the Israeli Government makes special arrangements on religious holidays for both Christians and Muslims, the main complaint remained inadequate free access arrangements in terms of number of permits issued and lack of smooth access.

Palestinian political violence has prevented Israelis from reaching Jewish holy sites such as Joseph's Tomb near Nablus. Since the outbreak of the Intifada, the Israeli Government has prohibited Israeli citizens in unofficial capacities from traveling to the parts of the West Bank under the civil and security control of the PA. This restriction prevented Israeli Arabs from visiting Muslim and Christian holy sites in the West Bank, and it prevented Jewish Israelis from visiting other sites, including the Wadi Qelt Synagogue and Shalom Al Yisrael Synagogue in Jericho. Settlers in Hebron have harassed Muslim worshipers at the Tomb of the Patriarchs in Hebron and vice versa. During the reporting period, Israeli officers at times prevented the muezzin at the al-Ibrahimi Mosque/Tomb of the Patriarchs in Hebron from sounding the call to prayer when Jews were praying in their portion of the shrine.

== Religious discrimination ==
The 2007 study found incidents of societal abuse and discrimination based on religious belief primarily between Christians and Muslims. Relations between Jews and non-Jews often were strained as a result of the Palestinian-Israeli conflict, as well as Israel's control of access to sites holy to Christians and Muslims. Relations among different branches of Judaism were also strained.

Societal attitudes continue to be a barrier to interfaith marriage and conversions. Most Christian and Muslim families encourage their children—especially their daughters—to marry within their respective religious groups. Couples who challenge this societal norm encounter considerable societal and familial opposition. Conversion is particularly challenging for Muslims converting to Christianity.

Israeli authorities required Christian clergy serving in the West Bank or Jerusalem, except some of those covered by the status quo agreement or who are affiliated with recognized nongovernmental organization (NGOs), to leave the country every 90 days to renew their tourist visas. Catholic and Orthodox priests, nuns, and other religious workers, often from Syria and Lebanon, face long delays and are sometimes denied applications for security reasons. The shortage of foreign clergy impedes the functioning of Christian congregations.

The Palestinian Authority failed to halt several cases of seizures of Christian-owned land in the Bethlehem area by criminal gangs. In many cases criminal gangs reportedly used forged land documents to assert ownership of lands belonging to Christians. Police failed to investigate most of these cases. In two cases police arrested and then released the suspects on bail and allowed them to continue occupying the land in question. There were reports this reporting period that Palestinian Authority security forces and judicial officials colluded with members of these gangs to seize land from Christians.

There were also published complaints that Israeli authorities failed to fully investigate incidents of violence against Muslims and Christians and unconfirmed reports of Christians being targeted for extortion or abuse by PA officials which the PA failed to investigate.

The PA has not taken sufficient action to remedy past harassment and intimidation of Christian residents of Bethlehem by the city's Muslim majority. In September 2006, seven churches were attacked in protest against remarks Pope Benedict XVI made about Islam and Muhammad. Palestinian leaders across the political spectrum condemned the attacks against churches, calling for unity among all Palestinians—Christian and Muslim. There were numerous other attacks in the Gaza Strip by extremist groups, including against internet cafes, music shops, a Christian bookstore (since closed,) and the Gaza City American International School. Gunmen reportedly associated with a Salafist Muslim group attacked a Gazan elementary school sports festival sponsored by the UN Relief and Works Agency for Palestine Refugees in the Near East (UNRWA), citing the school's mixed-gender activities as contrary to Islamic teachings.

== Attitude towards Christians ==
Churches in Jerusalem, the West Bank, and Gaza operate under one of three general categories:

1. Churches recognized by the status quo agreements reached under Ottoman rule in the late 19th century. This group includes the Greek Orthodox, Roman Catholic, Armenian Orthodox, Assyrian, Syriac Orthodox, Greek Catholic, Coptic, Ethiopian Orthodox, Episcopal and Lutheran Churches. Their ecclesiastical courts' rulings are considered legally binding on personal status and some property matters.
2. Protestants, including evangelical, churches established between the late 19th century and 1967, which, although they exist and operate, are not recognized officially by the PA. This group includes the Assembly of God, Nazarene Church and some Baptist churches. They are permitted free operation and can perform some personal status legal functions.
3. Jehovah's Witnesses and some evangelical Christian groups which have encountered opposition to their efforts to obtain recognition, both from Muslims, who oppose their proselytizing, and from Christians, who fear the new arrivals may disrupt the status quo.

Between 36,000–50,000 Christians live in the Palestinian Authority, most of whom belong to the Orthodox (Greek Orthodox and Arab Orthodox) and Catholic (including Melchite) churches. The majority of Palestinian Christians live in the Bethlehem, Ramallah and Nablus areas.

Israeli historian Benny Morris describes Christian-Muslim relations as a divisive element in Palestinian society.

In 2007 there were 3,200 Christians living in the Gaza Strip. Half the Christian community in Gaza fled to the West Bank and abroad after the Hamas take-over in 2007.

Christian communities in the Palestinian Authority and the Gaza Strip have greatly dwindled over the last two decades. The causes of the Palestinian Christian exodus are widely debated. Reuters reports that many Palestinian Christians emigrate in pursuit of better living standards, while the BBC also blames the economic decline in the Palestinian Authority as well as pressure from the security situation upon their life style. The Vatican and the Catholic Church sees Israeli occupation and the general conflict in the Holy Land as the principal reasons for the Christian exodus from the territories. There have also been cases of persecution by radical Islamist elements, mainly in the Gaza Strip.

In 2007, the United States Department of State released a study of the state of religious freedom in the Palestinian territories as part of its annual international study. According to the report, Christians and Muslims enjoyed good relations although tensions existed. Existing tensions between Jews and non-Jews remained high during the reporting period, and continuing violence heightened those tensions. The report concluded that the PA government policy contributed to the generally free practice of religion, although problems persisted related to interfaith-conflicts, including discriminatory and preferential treatment.

In 2012, a group of 50 young Muslim teenagers attacked a Christian residential complex in Bethphage, throwing rocks, smashing cars and windows and injuring several residents. The Latin Patriarch of Jerusalem, the Custos of the Holy Land and the Auxiliary Bishop of Jerusalem visited the site to witness the damage and condemn the incident.

== Attitude towards Jews and Judaism ==
Rhetoric by Palestinian militant groups include expressions of anti-Semitism. Some Muslim religious leaders preach sermons on the official PA television station that included expressions of anti-Semitism. Among these, in May 2005, Sheikh Ibrahim Mudayri preached a sermon in which he compared Jews to "a virus, like AIDS."

== Attitude towards irreligion ==
Atheists and irreligious people in Palestine face discrimination and challenges not faced by religious Palestinians. Waleed Al-Husseini, an atheist blogger, was arrested by Palestinian intelligence agents and spent 10 months in a West Bank prison for making online statements criticizing Islam, during which he was repeatedly abused and interrogated. He later fled to Jordan and lived in Paris. According to the Ma'an News Agency, while secular political beliefs are "not uncommon" in Palestinian society, "the expression of views seen as hostile to the dominant religions is viewed by many as incitement rather than free speech."

== See also ==
- Freedom of religion in Israel
- Irreligion in Israel
- Islamization of Gaza
- Islamization of East Jerusalem under Jordanian rule
- Islamization of the Temple Mount
