= HMS President =

Five ships and one shore establishment of the Royal Navy have been named HMS President, after the office of president meaning "one who presides over an assembly". In the case of the first two British ships, the name may have applied to the Lord President of the Privy Council.

This ship-name lapsed from 1660 to 1806, when it was revived by the capture of the French frigate Président, and then perpetuated by the 1815 capture of the American super-frigate USS President. These captures were commemorated by a new *HMS President, which survived from 1829 till 1903, and which passed the name to a series of Presidents of which three survive to this day.

- English ship President (1646) was a 26-gun ship purchased in 1646, known as Old President after 1650, and sold in 1656.
- English ship President (1650) was a 42-gun fourth rate ship launched in 1650, renamed Bonaventure in 1660, rebuilt 1666, and broken up 1711.
- HMS President (1806) was a 38-gun fifth rate ship, originally the French Président, captured in 1806, renamed Piedmontaise in 1815 and broken up in the same year.
- HMS President (1825) was a 14-gun fifth rate, originally the American frigate USS President, captured in 1815 and broken up June 1818.
- HMS President (1829) was a 52-gun fourth rate launched in 1829, used as a drill ship of the Royal Naval Reserve after 1862 and sold in 1903. She was briefly known as Old President for part of 1903.
- HMS President (shore establishment) is the home of the London Division of the Royal Naval Reserve. It has been a shore establishment near Tower Bridge overlooking the entrance to St Katharine Docks since 1988. Ships that have been previously renamed HMS President whilst serving as the home of the London Division of the Royal Naval Reserve include:
  - HMS Gannet, an Doterel-class screw sloop, launched in 1878 and renamed HMS President in 1903. She was sold in 1911, but survived to be displayed in Chatham Historic Dockyard.
  - HMS Buzzard, a Nymphe-class screw sloop launched in 1887 and renamed HMS President in 1911. She was lent away in 1919 and sold in 1821.
  - HMS Marjoram, an Anchusa-class sloop was to have been the next HMS President, but she was wrecked before she could be refitted.
  - HMS Saxifrage, an Anchusa-class sloop launched in 1918 instead became HMS President in 1921, serving as such until 1988. She was berthed in the River Thames on the Victoria Embankment until 2016, when she was moved to Chatham, and as of 2026 faces imminent scrapping.

== Battle honours ==
- Portland 1653
- Gabbard 1653
- Scheveningen 1653
- Java 1811
- San Sebastian 1823.

== See also ==
- SS President, 19th-century steamer
- President (1924 steamboat), 20th-century steamer
- USS President
