= USS Argus =

USS Argus may refer to one of these United States Navy ships:

- USS Argus (1803), a brig commissioned in 1803 that served in the First Barbary War and the War of 1812 until captured by the British in 1813;
- USS Argus (1813), was laid down at the Washington Navy Yard and was still on the ways when the British advanced on Washington, D.C., late in the summer of 1814. She was burned to prevent her capture by the British; and
- USS Argus (PY-14), a patrol yacht in commission from February to September 1941 and from 1942 to 1946 that served during World War II.
