= USS Chesapeake =

USS Chesapeake may refer to:

- USS Chesapeake (1799), a 38-gun frigate in commission from 1800 to 1813
- USS Chesapeake, a sloop renamed Patapsco in 1799 while still under construction, launched in 1799, and sold in 1801
- USS Chesapeake, a bark which served as a training ship from 1900 to 1910, was renamed Severn in 1905, and served as a submarine tender from 1910 until decommissioned in 1916
- USS Chesapeake (ID-3395), a salvage ship in commission from March to October 1919
- SS Chesapeake (AOT-5084), a transport tanker in service from 2000 to 2009
- USS Chesapeake (FFG-64), a proposed Constellation-class guided missile frigate
