= The President (Palestinian TV series) =

Palestinian reality show

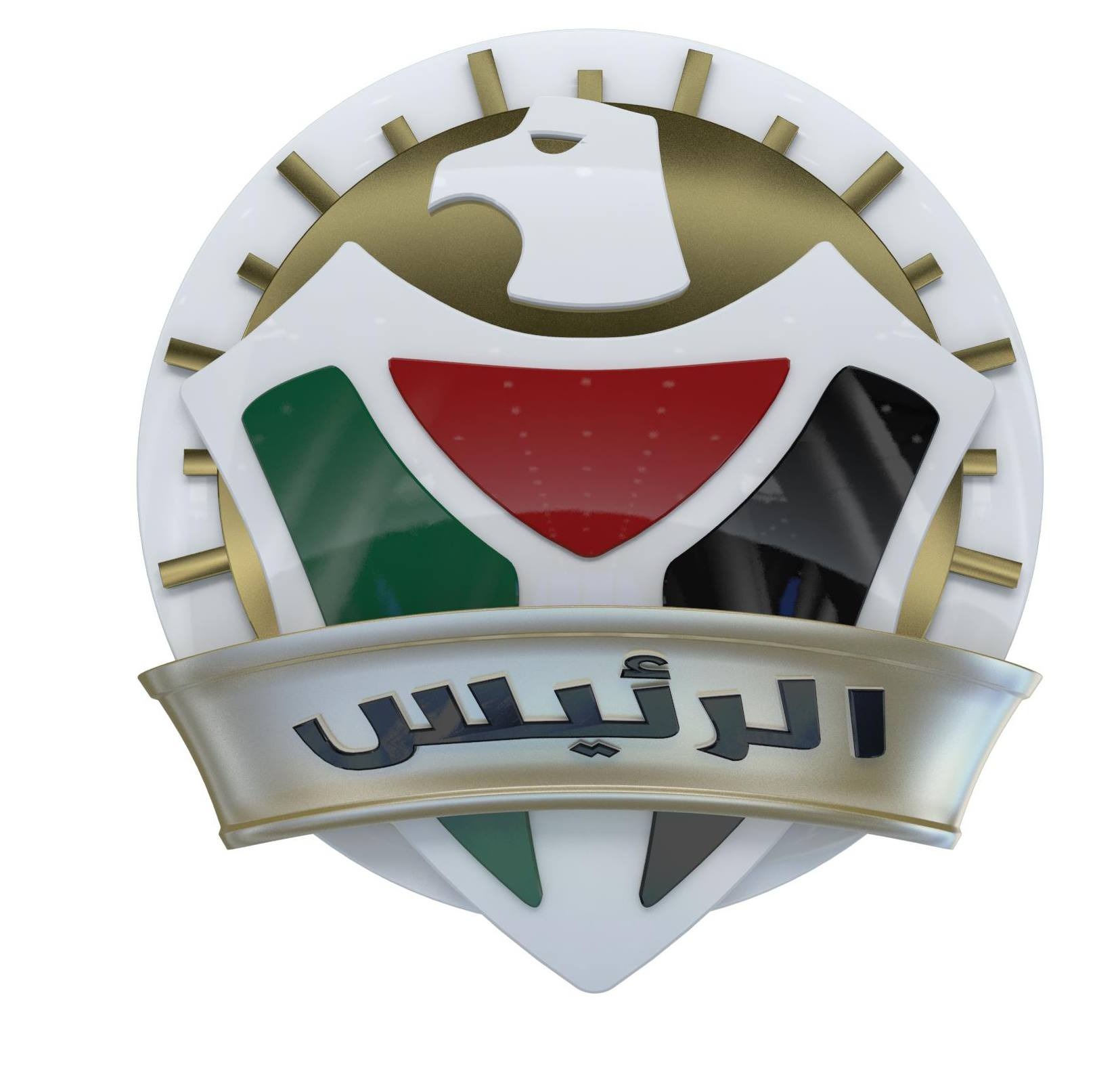
- Genre: Reality show
- Created by: Ma'an Network and Search for Common Ground
- Country of origin: Palestine
- Original language: Arabic
- No. of episodes: 30

Original release
- Network: Ma'an Satellite
- Release: March 14, 2013 – present

The President (Arabic: الرئيس, romanized: alrrayiys) is a reality show created by Ma'an Network and Search for Common Ground, and was originally aired in 2013 in the Palestinian territories. The show, a cross between American Idol and The Apprentice, tasks viewers and a panel of expert judges with selecting the show candidate that they hope to see become the next Palestinian President. The program was designed to promote democratic values and procedures to a Palestinian audience and engage citizens in democratic processes.

The President was funded by a two-year grant from the Dutch Ministry of Foreign Affairs.

== Season 1 ==
In the first season, 1,200 candidates ages 25–35 from the West Bank, Gaza, and Israel auditioned to compete in an elimination-style series of trials designed to test their political skills, including acting as a Palestinian ambassador in a foreign country, managing a large Palestinian corporation for a day, answering hard-hitting questions on live TV on various political, social, and economic issues affecting Palestinians, exhibiting sufficient self-discipline to be "on-call" and "on-message" 24/7 while on the campaign trail, and keeping their cool in an intense, televised political debate. Throughout broadcasting, candidates were evaluated by a panel of celebrity judges, including Dr. Hanan Ashrawi, Ahmad Tibi, and Ammar A. Aker, CEO of Paltel. Audience members voted via SMS at the end of each episode, eliminating the least popular candidate. In the finale, the two final contestants participated in a live TV debate to decide the winner. Hussein Al-Deek from Ramallah was declared the winner of the first season.
