= President =

President most commonly refers to:

- President (corporate title)
- President (education), a leader of a college or university
- President (government title)

President may also refer to:

== Arts and entertainment ==
=== Film and television ===
- Præsidenten, a 1919 Danish silent film directed by Carl Theodor Dreyer
- The President (1928 film), a German silent drama
- President (1937 film), an Indian film
- The President (1961 film)
- The Presidents (film), a 2005 documentary
- The President (2014 film)
- The President (South Korean TV series), a 2010 South Korean television series
- The President (Palestinian TV series), a 2013 Palestinian reality television show
- The President Show, a 2017 Comedy Central political satirical parody sitcom
- Presidents (film), a 2021 French film

=== Music ===
- The Presidents (American soul band)
- The Presidents of the United States of America (band) or the Presidents, an American alternative rock group
- President (band), an anonymous English metal band
- "The President", a song by Snow Patrol from the 2011 album Fallen Empires
- "The Presidents", a song by Jonathan Coulton
- "The Presidents", a song on Animaniacs
- The President, a band led by Wayne Horvitz

=== Other uses in arts and entertainment ===
- President (card game), a westernized version of an originally Japanese card game named daifugō or daihinmin
- The President (play), by Thomas Bernhard
- The President (Rick and Morty), a fictional character

== Places ==
- The President (mountain), in British Columbia, Canada
- President Township, Pennsylvania, U.S.
- An earlier name for the Sipapu Bridge

== Transportation ==
=== Automobiles ===
- Nissan President, a 1966–2010 Japanese full-size sedan
- Plaxton President, a British double-deck bus body
- Studebaker President, a 1926–1942 American full-size sedan
- VinFast President, a 2020–2022 Vietnamese mid-size SUV

=== Ships ===
- President (1924 steamboat), an American river excursion steamboat
- President (narrowboat), a preserved English, steam-powered narrowboat
- HMS President, the name of several British ships and a shore establishment
- USS President, the name of several American ships
- SS President, a 19th-century transatlantic steamship
- French frigate Président and later HMS President, a 40-gun frigate
- President-class frigate, a class of South African frigates

== Other uses ==
- Président (brand), a brand of French cheese and butter
- President (CSRT), head of a Combatant Status Review Tribunal in the U.S. military
- President (grape) or Gouais blanc, a French wine grape
- President (LDS Church honorific), a title in The Church of Jesus Christ of Latter-day Saints
- The President (tree), a giant sequoia in California, U.S.
- Président (typeface), a font designed by Adrian Frutiger
- Andre President (born 1971), American football player
- Sinclair President, an electronic calculator in the late 1970s

== See also ==
- Mr. President (disambiguation)
- Präsident, an automobile manufactured by Nesselsdorfer Wagenbau
- Precedent, a previous court ruling
- Presidency, administrative and governmental entity that exists around an office of president of a state or nation
- Presidential (disambiguation)
- Category:Presidents by country
- Category:Lists of presidents
