= USS President =

USS President may refer to the following ships of the United States Navy:

- USS President (1800), was a 44-gun American frigate, launched in 1800 that the British Royal Navy captured in 1815. The Royal Navy took her into service as HMS President.
- USS President (1812), was a 12-gun American sloop, purchased in 1812 that the British captured in 1814. She served simultaneously with, but separately from, the first President.

== See also ==
- HMS President
