= Ma'an News Agency =

Palestinian wire service

Ma'an News Agency (MNA)
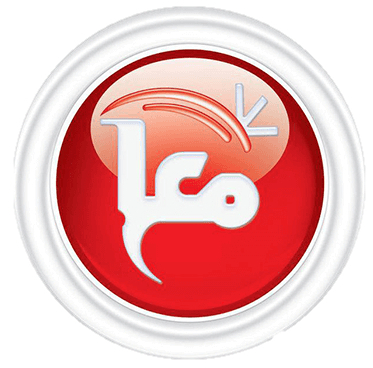
- Founded: 2005
- Founder: Raed Othman
- Headquarters: Palestinian territories
- Website: www.maannews.net

Ma'an News Agency (MNA; Arabic: وكالة معا الإخبارية) is a large wire service created in 2005 in the Palestinian territories. It is part of the Ma'an Network, a non-governmental organization media network created in 2002 in the Palestinian territories among independent journalists throughout the West Bank and Gaza Strip. It has partnerships with eight local television stations and twelve local radio stations. Ma'an News Agency publishes news 24 hours a day in Arabic, Hebrew and English, and claims to be one of the largest wire services in the Palestinian territories, with over three million visits per month. Ma'an News Agency also publishes feature stories, analysis and opinion articles. The agency's headquarters are based in Bethlehem and it has an office in Gaza.

== History ==
The Ma'an Network was launched in 2002 as a partnership between Bethlehem TV and local Palestinian media organizations. The name Ma'an is the Arabic word for "together". The group is run by Raed Othman, the former manager of Bethlehem TV. Ma'an has produced three soap operas (one of which, Mazih fi Jad (Joking Seriously), was described as the first television drama series produced in the Palestinian territories), numerous news and public affairs programs and the television film Kafah. Ma'an's programs are broadcast by ten independent terrestrial television stations in the West Bank and occasionally by the Fatah-run Palestine TV satellite broadcaster.

The Ma'an News Agency was launched in 2005 with funding from the Danish and Dutch Representative Offices to the Palestinian National Authority. The news agency is the most visible component of the Ma'an Network.

== Attacks from Israel ==
Ma'an's offices in Gaza were severely damaged in the Gaza war by the Israeli bombing of the Al-Watan tower in Gaza City on 8 October 2023.

A photographer from the agency, Abdel Nasser al-Laham, was arrested by Israeli forces on 16 October 2023, and was held without charge in the military's Ofer Prison.

== Independence ==
Ma'an News Agency says that it "scrupulously maintains its editorial independence and aims to promote access to information, freedom of expression, press freedom, and media pluralism in Palestine." In an interview with media scholar Matt Sienkiewicz, former Ma'an Chief financial officer Wisam Kutom stated that he told potential Ma'an funders that: "Palestinian television is factional television right now we [Palestinians] cannot tell the stories we want to, only the stories the factions will let us. There is no independent television".

== Funding ==
Funding for Ma'an Network comes from advertising revenue and from foreign donors.

== Hamas pressure ==
In July 2007, at the time the de facto Gaza Strip government, MNA alleged that MNA's chief editor had received "direct threats" from Hamas to carry out a "defamation campaign" against MNA, and to cease its criticism of "the Hamas movement".

In July 2013, Hamas closed the Gaza City bureaus of Ma'an and Al-Arabiya after the outlets reported that Hamas was sheltering Muslim Brotherhood figures who had fled Egypt. Hamas officials also questioned Ma’an News bureau chief Emad Eid for several hours on 30 July. According to Ma’an News director-general Raed Othman, Hamas objected to Ma'an using sources from Israeli media. The bureau reopened in November.

== Reach ==
Ma'an News Agency describes itself as "the main source of independent news from Palestine" and "the premier source of independent Palestinian news on the internet". According to a 2007 survey, 95.6% of Palestinians with internet access "frequently visit" the site. As of December 2013, Ma'an News receives the fourth most site visitors in the Palestinian territories.

== Reality TV ==
In 2013, Ma'an TV (Ma'an Network's satellite channel) broadcast the hit reality show The President in collaboration with Search for Common Ground. Described as "a cross between American Idol and The Apprentice", audience members would vote through SMS to elect the show's young contestants who competed in mock press conferences, political campaigns, and debates.

== Reliability ==
Palestinian Media Watch (PMW), a right-wing NGO that claims to reveal bias in Palestinian media, criticized Ma'an for "sanitizing" its English-language reporting while publishing in Arabic reports that "include the hate ideology espoused by the terror organizations that deny Israel's right to exist [and] express reverence for suicide terrorists."

According to The New York Times during the spate of Palestinian stabbing attacks against Israelis in 2015, Ma'an inaccurately reported that a young knife attacker had been "murdered" by Israeli police, (he was wounded and taken for treatment at Hadassah Hospital), "In a video report accusing Israel of faking evidence of other knife attacks, a reporter for the Palestinian news agency Ma'an described the clip as evidence of "murder" and claimed in her narration that the video showed the boy lying on the ground when "an Israeli occupation soldier shoots him in the head," which it does not."

== See also ==
- Wafa
- Palestinian Information Center
