= Maharram Bayramov =

Maharram Bayramov Məhərrəm Bayramov
- Məhərrəm Bağır oğlu Bayramov
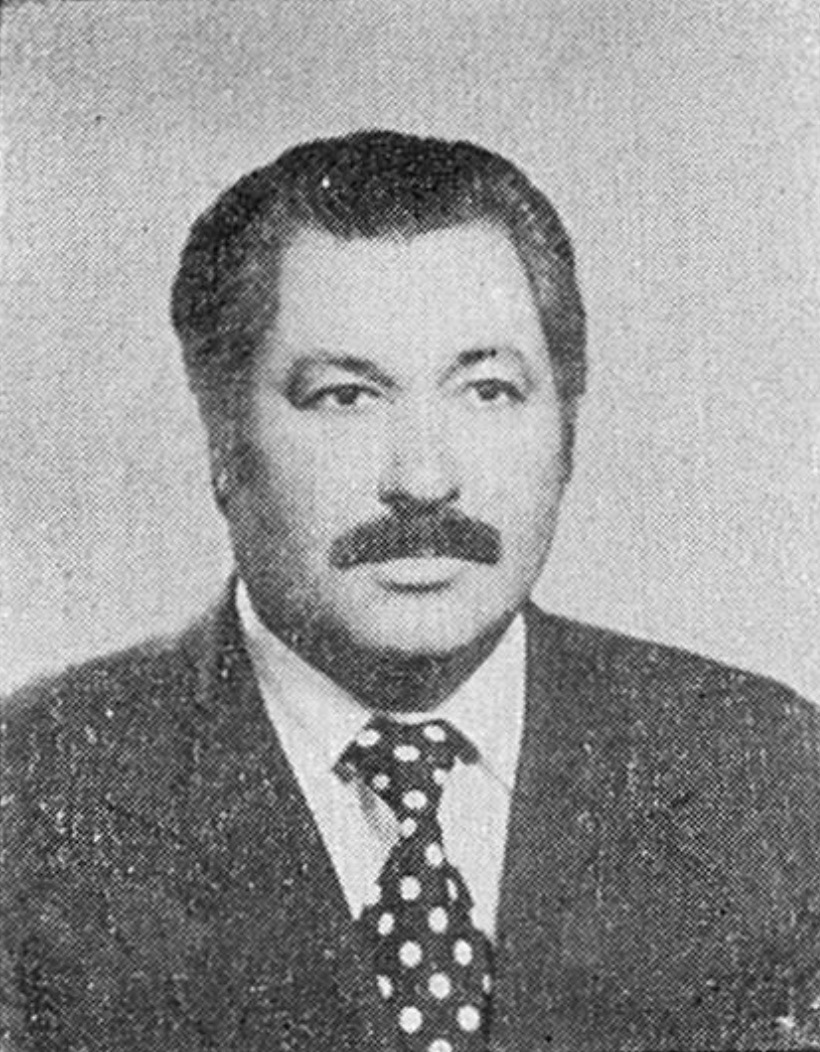

The First Secretary of the Party Committee of Amasia District
- In office 1969–1974
- Preceded by: Harutun Hakopyan
- Succeeded by: Jahangir Aliyev

Editor-in-chief of Sovet Ermenistani newspaper
- In office 1974–1981
- Preceded by: Habib Hasanov
- Succeeded by: Jahangir Aliyev

Personal details
- Born: May 13, 1928 Ashagy Nejili, Erivan uezd, Armenian SSR, TSFSR, Soviet Union
- Died: January 6, 1981 (aged 52) Erivan, Armenian SSR, Soviet Union
- Party: CPSU
- Awards: Honored Journalist of the Armenian SSR

Maharram Baghir oghlu Bayramov (Azerbaijani: Məhərrəm Bağır oğlu Bayramov, May 13, 1928 — January 6, 1981) was the First Secretary of the Party Committee of Amasia District (1969-1974), member of the Central Committee of the Communist Party of Armenia, deputy chairman of the Presidium of the Supreme Soviet of the Armenian SSR, deputy of the Supreme Soviet of the Armenian SSR (VIII–X convocation), editor-in-chief of the newspaper Sovet Ermenistani (1974-1981), Honored Journalist of the Armenian SSR.

== Biography ==
Maharram Bayramov was born on May 13, 1928, in the village of Ashagy Nejili. After finishing the seven-year village school here, he continued his education at the Yerevan Azerbaijan Pedagogical School and worked as a teacher in the village where he was born. He studied at the Faculty of Philology of Azerbaijan State University in 1947–1952. After working in Baku for two years, he returned to Yerevan in 1954, where he worked as an instructor at the Central Committee of the Youth Union of Lenin Komsomol of Armenia. In 1955, he was promoted to the position of trainer of the Central Committee of the Communist Party of Armenia.

Maharram Bayramov worked as the secretary of the Vedi District committee in 1964-1966, and as the deputy editor of the Sovet Ermenistani newspaper in 1966-1969. From 1969 to 1974, he was the First Secretary of the Amasia District Party Committee, and from 1974 to the end of his life, he was the editor-in-chief of the Sovet Ermenistani newspaper. During these years, Maharram Bayramov was also a deputy of the Supreme Soviet of the Armenian SSR and a deputy chairman of the Presidium of the Supreme Soviet of the Armenian SSR.

Maharram Bayramov was murdered on January 6, 1981, in Yerevan.

== Awards ==
- Honored Journalist of the Armenian SSR
- Order of the Badge of Honour
