= Jafar Valibeyov =

Azerbaijani newspaper editor (1907–1981)

Jafar Valibeyov Cəfər Vəlibəyov

Director of the Yerevan Turkish Drama Theater
- In office 1929–1932

Basarkechar District Komsomol Committee Secretary
- In office 1932–unknown

The First Secretary of the Party Committee of Amasia District
- In office 1930–1936

The First Secretary of the Karabakhlar District Party Committee
- In office 1947–1949
- Preceded by: Talib Musayev

Personal details
- Born: 1907 Akarak, Etchmiadzin uezd, Erivan Governorate, Russian Empire
- Died: 1981 (aged 73–74) Baku, Azerbaijan SSR, USSR
- Party: CPSU
- Awards: Honored Journalist of the Armenian SSR

Jafar Mehdi oghlu Valibeyov (Azerbaijani: Cəfər Mehdi oğlu Vəlibəyov, 1907–1981) was the First Secretary of the Party Committee of Amasia District, Honored Journalist of the Armenian SSR (1971).

== Biography ==
Jafar Valibeyov was born in 1907 in the village of Akarak. At the age of 22, he worked as the director of the Yerevan Turkish Drama Theater, at the age of 25, the Secretary of the Komsomol Committee of the Basarkechar District, then the editor of the "Maldarlıq cəbhəsində" newspaper published in the Amasia District, and then the Secretary of the Party Committee of the Amasia District.

From 1938 to 1947, Jafar Valibeyov worked as the editor of the Sovet Ermenistani newspaper, and in 1947–1949, he worked as the first secretary of the Party Committee of the Karabakhlar District. In 1949, Jafar Valibayov was again appointed as the editor of Sovet Ermenistani and headed the editorial staff until 1961.

He died in 1981 in Baku.
