= Talib Musayev =

Talib Musayev Talıb Musayev

The First Secretary of the Basarkechar District Committee of the Communist Party of Armenia
- In office April 1946 – 1953
- Preceded by: Meloyan

The First Secretary of the Karabakhlar District Committee of the Communist Party of Armenia
- In office 1942 – April 1946
- Preceded by: Ibish Abbasov
- Succeeded by: Jafar Valibeyov

Personal details
- Born: January 1, 1908 Narimanly, Nor Bayazet uezd, Erivan Governorate, Russian Empire
- Died: April 4, 2005 (aged 97)
- Education: Armenian State Pedagogical University

Talib Gurban oghlu Musayev (Azerbaijani: Talıb Qurban oğlu Musayev, Armenian: Թալիբ Գուրբան օղլու Մուսաև; January 1, 1908 — April 4, 2005) was an Azerbaijani and Armenian statesman, First Secretary of the Basarkechar District Committee of the Communist Party of Armenia.

== Biography ==
Talib Musayev was born in 1908 in the village of Narimanly. He graduated from Yerevan Pedagogical Institute in 1943.

In 1936, he was elected First Secretary of the Basarkechar District Komsomol Committee. In 1937, he was elected the III secretary of the district party committee, and a little later the II secretary. In 1939, he was appointed the chairman of the Basarkechar District Executive Committee, in 1942, Karabakhlar, and in 1946, the first secretary of the Basarkechar District Party Committee. In 1948, he studied Marxism-Leninism in Moscow while remaining in his post.

He was elected the First Deputy Chairman of the Supreme Soviet of the Armenian SSR, and several times was selected a member of the parliament of the Supreme Soviet of the Armenian SSR.

Talib Musayev died on April 4, 2005.
