= Habib Hasanov =

Habib Hasanov Həbib Həsənov

Minister of Forestry of the Azerbaijan SSR
- In office January 16, 1981 – September 1, 1988
- Preceded by: office established
- Succeeded by: office cancelled

Chairman of the State Forestry Committee of the Azerbaijan SSR
- In office March 27, 1980 – January 16, 1981
- Preceded by: Mehdi Mustafayev
- Succeeded by: office cancelled

The First Secretary of the Tovuz District Committee of the Communist Party of Azerbaijan
- In office 1974 – March 1980
- Succeeded by: Heybat Tahirov

Deputy Chairman of the Presidium of the Supreme Soviet of the Armenian SSR

The First Secretary of the Amasia District Committee of the Communist Party of Armenia
- In office 1956–1960
- Preceded by: Aleksan Kirakosyan
- Succeeded by: Huseyn Mammadov

Personal details
- Born: August 5, 1922 Aghzibir, Yeni Bayazid uezd, Armenian SSR, TSFSR
- Died: 2004 (aged 81–82) Baku, Azerbaijan
- Party: CPSU

Habib Rahim oghlu Hasanov (Azerbaijani: Həbib Rəhim oğlu Həsənov, August 5, 1922 — 2004) was an Azerbaijani statesman, Minister of Forestry of the Azerbaijan SSR (1981–1988), First Secretary of the Tovuz District Committee of the Communist Party of Azerbaijan (1974–1980), First Secretary of the Amasia District Committee of the Communist Party of Armenia (1956–1960), Deputy Chairman of the Presidium of the Supreme Soviet of the Armenian SSR, Honored Journalist of the Armenian SSR (1971).

== Biography ==
Habib Hasanov was born on August 5, 1922, in the village of Aghzibir, Armenian SSR. Since 1941, he worked as a teacher and later as a director of a village school in Azizbekov raion. Since 1947, he attended the Higher Party School in Moscow, worked as a department head of the Azizbekov raion Party Committee of Armenia, the second secretary of the Echmiadzin Party Committee, and the First Secretary of the Amasia District.

Since 1960, he had been the editor-in-chief of the Sovet Ermenistani newspaper, the Deputy Chairman of the Presidium of the Supreme Soviet of the Armenian SSR. From 1974, he worked as the First Secretary of the Tovuz District Committee of the Communist Party of Azerbaijan, from 1980 as the Chairman of the State Forestry Committee of the Azerbaijan SSR, from 1981 to 1988 as the Minister of Forestry of the Azerbaijan SSR.

He was repeatedly elected a member of the Central Committee of the Communist Party of Armenia, 5 times a deputy of the Supreme Soviet of the Armenian SSR, 3 times a deputy of the Supreme Soviet of the Azerbaijan SSR.

== Awards ==
- Order of Lenin
- Order of the Red Banner of Labor
