= Zarbali Gurbanov =

Azerbaijani Soviet politician

Zarbali Gurbanov Zərbəli Qurbanov

The First Secretary of the Party Committee of Amasia District
- In office 1981–1985
- Preceded by: Jahangir Aliyev
- Succeeded by: Ildirim Baghirov

Personal details
- Born: 1932 Narimanli, Basarkecher District, Armenian SSR, USSR
- Died: 2003 (aged 70–71) Baku, Azerbaijan
- Education: Higher Party School; Azerbaijan Agricultural Institute

Zarbali Gasim oghlu Gurbanov (Azerbaijani: Zərbəli Qasım oğlu Qurbanov, 1932 — 2003) was the First Secretary of Amasia District Party Committee (1981-1985), editor of Sovet Ermenistani newspaper (1985-1989).

== Biography ==
Zarbali Gurbanov was born in 1932 in the village of Narimanli. He graduated from Nakhchivan Pedagogical School, Azerbaijan Agricultural Institute, Higher Party School.

Z. Gurbanov was the First Secretary of the Party Committee of Amasia District in 1981–1985, and after 1985 he was the editor of Sovet Ermenistani. On July 12, 1994, he was appointed to the position of leading personnel inspector at the State Committee of Republic of Azerbaijan for Refugees and IDPs. From 1998 until the end of his life, he worked in the presidential office.

He died in 2003 in Baku.
