= Rza Valibeyov =

Armenian Soviet state official (1903–1974)

Rza Valibeyov Rza Vəlibəyov
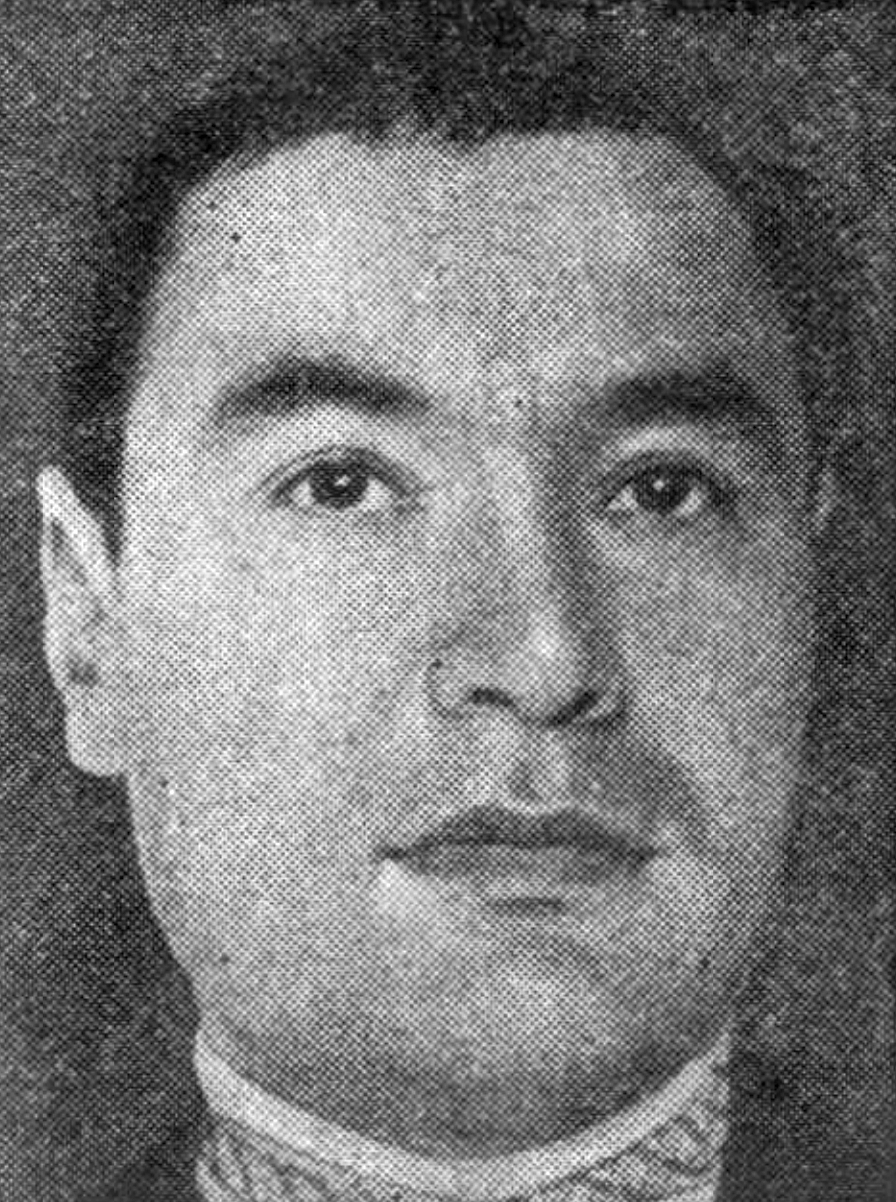

The First Secretary of the Vedi District Party Committee

Deputy Chairman of the Council of People's Commissars of Armenia
- In office 1937–unknown

First Deputy Minister of Education of the Armenian SSR
- In office 1949–1962

Chairman of the Executive Committee of the Vedi District Council
- In office 1922–1924

Personal details
- Born: 1903 Akarak, Etchmiadzin uezd, Erivan Governorate, Russian Empire
- Died: 1974 (aged 70–71) Erivan, Armenian SSR, USSR
- Resting place: Yerevan Central City Cemetery of Tokhmakh
- Party: CPSU

Rza Khalil oghlu Valibeyov (Azerbaijani: Rza Xəlil oğlu Vəlibəyov, Russian: Риза Халилович Велибеков; 1903–1974) was an Azerbaijani Soviet state-party figure, editor-in-chief of Sovet Ermenistani newspaper.

== Biography ==
Rza Valibeyov was born in 1903 in the village of Akarak. After studying at the Transcaucasia Communist University in 1924–1928, he worked as the secretary of the Basarkechar District Party Committee, and then for a short time as the editor of Gyzyl Shafaq.

After Rza Valibeyov worked as a department head in the Central Committee of the Communist Party of Armenia, People's Commissar of Justice of the Armenian SSR, Deputy Chairman of the Council of People's Commissars, in 1947–1949, he again worked as the editor of the Sovet Ermenistani newspaper, and in 1949–1962, he worked as the First Deputy Minister of Education of the Armenian SSR, and was a Deputy of the Supreme Soviet of the USSR and the Armenian SSR.

Despite some sources claiming that he is the only Azerbaijani buried in Yerevan's Alley of Honor (Pantheon), this is not true. In fact, Valibeyov is buried in the Central City Cemetery of Tokhmakh. His tombstone bears the Russified version of his name—Riza Khalilovich Velibekov.
