= Jahangir Aliyev =

Jahangir Aliyev Cahangir Əliyev
- Cahangir Həsənəli oğlu Əliyev
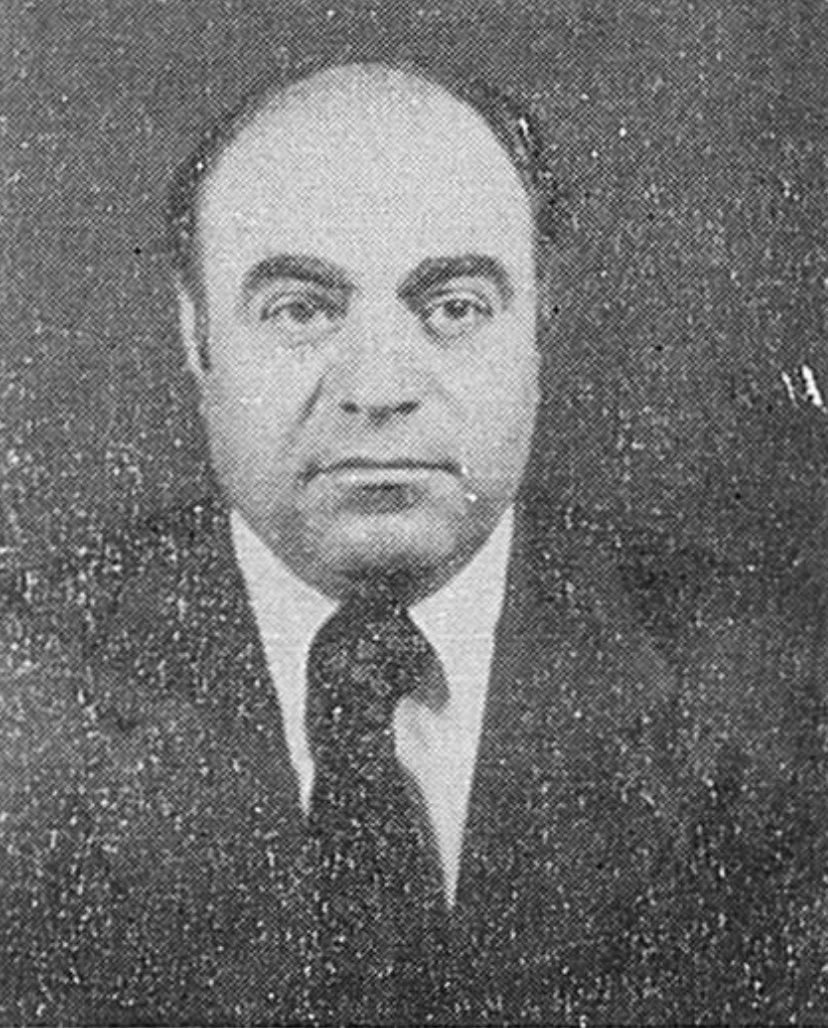

The First Secretary of the Party Committee of Amasia District
- In office 1974–1981
- Preceded by: Maharram Bayramov
- Succeeded by: Zarbali Gurbanov

Deputy Chairman of the Presidium of the Supreme Soviet of the Armenian SSR
- In office 1982–1985

Personal details
- Born: May 5, 1931 Duzkend, Amasia District, Armenian SSR, USSR
- Died: 2010 (aged 78–79)
- Party: CPSU
- Education: Azerbaijan Pedagogical Institute
- Awards

Jahangir Hasanali oghlu Aliyev (Azerbaijani: Cahangir Həsənəli oğlu Əliyev, May 5, 1931 — 2010) was the First secretary of the Party Committee of Amasia District (1974–1981), editor-in-chief of the newspaper Sovet Ermenistani (1981–1984), deputy chairman of the Presidium of the Supreme Soviet of the Armenian SSR (1982–1985), member of the Central Committee of the Communist Party of Armenia (1976–1984), Deputy of the Supreme Soviet of the Armenian SSR (IX–X convocation).

== Biography ==
Jahangir Aliyev was born on May 5, 1931, in the village of Duzkend. After graduating from Azerbaijan Pedagogical Institute, he started his career as a teacher in Duzkend school. In 1952–54, he worked as the second and then the first secretary of the district Komsomol committee.

In 1956–1962, he was promoted to the position of editor of the newspaper "Kolkhozchu tribunasi" published in Amasia District, and was elected a bureau member of the district party committee. In 1962–1964, after studying at the Baku Higher Party School and receiving higher political education, he worked as the deputy editor of the inter-regional Shirak newspaper, and later as the head of the propaganda and propaganda department at the Amasia District Party Committee. In 1965, he was appointed chairman of the executive committee of the Amasia District Council. After working in this position for four years, he was promoted to the position responsible for the propaganda and agitation department of the Central Committee of the Communist Party of Armenia.

In December 1974, Jahangir Aliyev was elected the first secretary of the Amasia District Party Committee. He was elected deputy to the Supreme Soviet of the Armenian SSR of the IX–X convocation (1975–1985), deputy chairman of the Presidium of the Supreme Soviet of Armenia (1982–85), member of the Central Committee of the Communist Party of Armenia.

In 1981, Jahangir Aliyev was appointed editor-in-chief of Sovet Ermenistani newspaper. He worked in this position until December 1984.

Jahangir Aliyev, who moved to Baku in 1985, first worked in the office of the Central Committee of the Communist Party of Azerbaijan, in the press department, and from 1991 he worked in Xalq newspaper.
