= Sabir Rizayev =

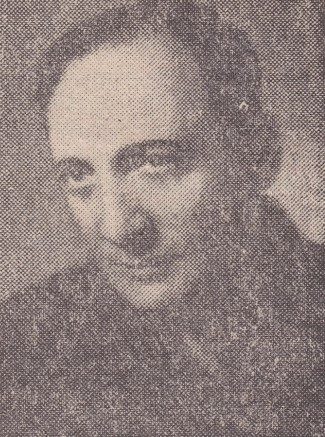
- Born: April 17, 1924; Erivan, Erivan uezd, Armenian SSR, TSFSR, USSR
- Died: December 20, 1978 (aged 54); Erivan, Armenian SSR, USSR
- Occupations: film critic, screenwriter, writer
- Awards: Honored Art Worker of the Armenian SSR

Sabir Akbar oghlu Rizayev (Azerbaijani: Sabir Əkbər oğlu Rizayev, April 17, 1924 – December 20, 1978) was a screenwriter, art scholar, theater and film critic. Honored Art Worker of the Armenian SSR (1975).

== Biography ==
Sabir Rizayev was born on April 17, 1924, in Erivan. Sabir graduated from high school in Moscow and volunteered for the war in 1942. After the end of the World War II, he returned to Yerevan and worked in the Sovet Ermenistani. Since 1948, his critical articles about theater plays and films had been published in the press.

Sabir Rizayev graduated from Yerevan State Institute of Theatrical Arts in 1951. In 1954, after graduating with honors from the post-graduate studies of the Leningrad State Institute of Theatre, Music, and Cinema, he headed the script department at the Armenfilm film studio and worked as the chief editor at the Armenian State Cinematography Committee. From 1965 until the end of his life, he worked as the deputy director of the Art Institute of the Academy of Sciences of the Armenian SSR and the secretary of the board of directors of the Union of Cinematographers of Armenia. As a result of his efforts, the Department of Cinema was established at the Art Institute, and a number of monographs were written.

Modern Armenian art critics call Sabir Rizayev the founder of Armenian film studies. Sabir Rizayev, who knew the Armenian language perfectly, wrote most of his works in Russian.

The first research work on the Yerevan Azerbaijan Drama Theater, authored by him, was published in Baku in Russian in 1963 under the title Azerbaijani theater in Armenia (Russian: Азербайджанский театр в Армении). The 165-page illustrated book Yunis Nuri written jointly by Sabir Rizayev and the actor's son Akbar Yerevanly about Yunis Nuri, the founder of the Azerbaijani theater in Yerevan, was published in Azerbaijani in 1980 and in Russian in 1982 by the Theater Society of Armenia in Yerevan.

Sabir Rizayev suffered a heart attack and died on December 20, 1978, while speaking at a conference in Yerevan. Sabir Rizayev was buried in Yerevan city cemetery with a large crowd.
