= Akbar Yerevanly =

Azerbaijani writer, literary critic, pedagogue, assistant professor

Akbar Yerevanly Əkbər Yerevanlı
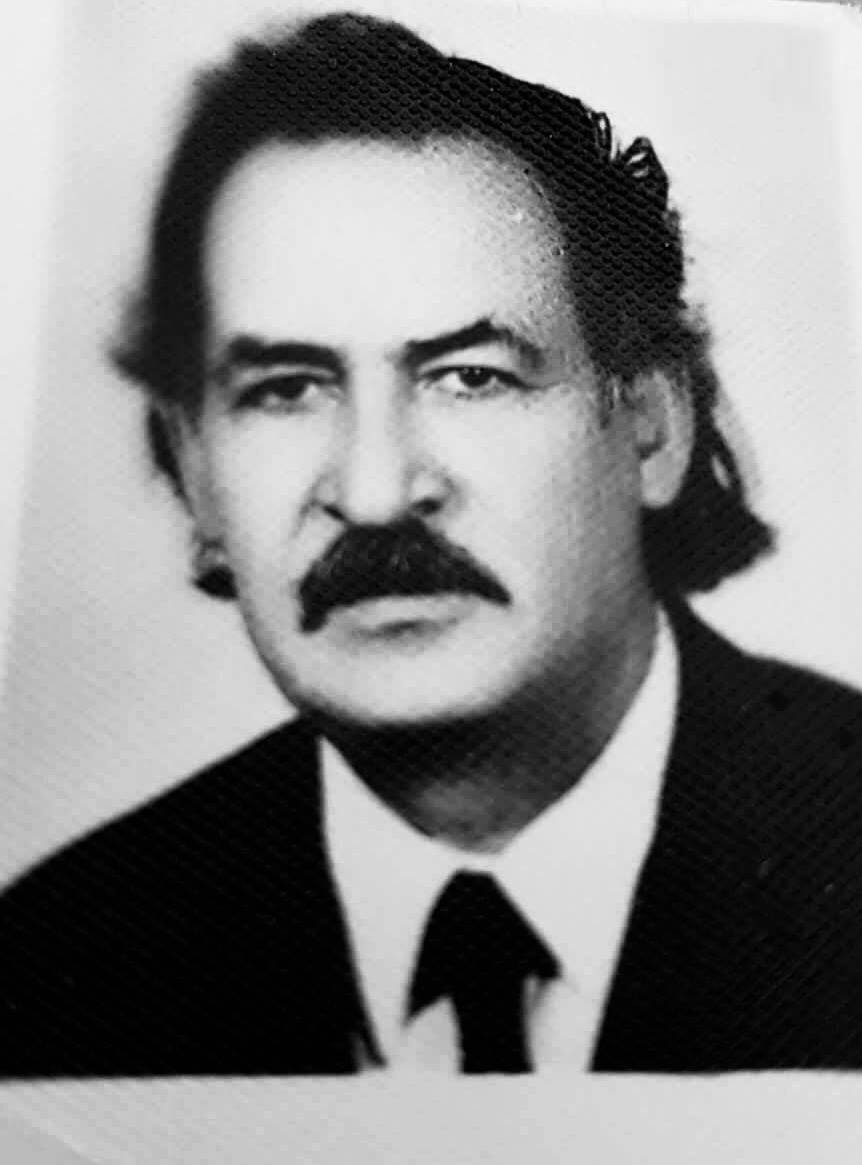
- Born: June 17, 1921; Erivan, Erivan uezd, Armenian SSR
- Died: August 28, 1982 (aged 61); Erivan, Armenian SSR, USSR
- Education: Yerevan State University
- Occupations: writer, literary scholar, pedagogue
- Father: Yunis Nuri

Akbar Yunis oghlu Suleymanov (Azerbaijani: Əkbər Yunis oğlu Süleymanov, June 17, 1921 –August 28, 1982) was an Azerbaijani writer, literary scholar, pedagogue, assistant professor (1956). He was the head of the Department of Azerbaijani Language and Literature of the Yerevan State Pedagogical Institute (1956–1980), head of the Azerbaijani branch of the Writers Union of the Armenian SSR (1964–1982).

== Biography ==
Akbar Suleymanov was born on June 17, 1921 in Erivan. In 1943–1948, he studied at the Oriental Department of the Faculty of Philology of Yerevan State University. He started his career in 1938 in Yerevan in the editorial office of Kommunist (later Sovet Ermenistani) newspaper published in Azerbaijani, worked as a literary worker, responsible secretary, translator.

In 1951, he entered the post-graduate course of the M. Abeghyan Institute of Literature of the Armenian National Academy of Sciences, and in 1954 defended his candidate's thesis on the topic Reflection of the friendship of the Armenian and Azerbaijani peoples in the Armenian and Azerbaijani Soviet literature. In 1950–1965, he was a lecturer of Azerbaijani literature at Yerevan State University, and from 1956 he worked as the head of the Department of Azerbaijani language and literature at the Yerevan State Pedagogical Institute. He conducted consistent research in the field of mutual literary relations between Armenia and Azerbaijan, and translated the works of a number of Armenian writers into Azerbaijani.

Akbar Yerevanly's doctoral dissertation on Azeri-Armenian literary relations. From ancient times to the end of the 18th century was published in the form of a 556-page monograph in Yerevan in 1968 by the Hayastan publishing house, but wasn't defent in Yerevan until the end of his life. Therefore, in 1975, he defended his doctoral dissertation Armenian-Azerbaijani literary relations (oral folk creativity, Ashik art and literature of the XI-XVIII centuries) in Baku.

The 166-page illustrated book Yunis Nuri written by Akbar Yerevanly together with Sabir Rizayev was published in 1980 by the Armenian Theater Society in Yerevan.

Akbar Yerevanly died on August 28, 1982, in Yerevan.
