= Valibeyov =

Valibeyov is a surname. Notable people with the surname include:

- Jafar Valibeyov (1907–1981), Azerbaijani newspaper editor
- Rza Valibeyov (1903–1974), Azerbaijani Soviet state-party figure
