= Narimanlu =

Narimanlu may refer to:

- Masis, Armenia, a town formed from the merger of several villages, among them Narimanlu
- Shatvan, Armenia, formerly named Narimanlu
