= Duzkend =

Duzkend may refer to:

- Akhuryan, Armenia
- Alvar, Armenia
- Barodz, Armenia
