= Yunis Nuri =

Azerbaijani actor (1878–1950)

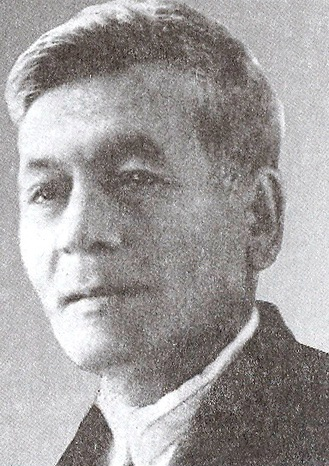
- Born: Yunis Haji Suleiman oglu Suleymanov; 23 January 1878; Erivan, Erivan uezd, Erivan Governorate, Russian Empire
- Died: 5 January 1950 (aged 71); Yerevan, Armenian SSR
- Occupation: Actor

Yunis Nuri or Yunus Nuri (23 January 1878, Erivan, Erivan uezd, Erivan Governorate – 5 January 1950, Yerevan, Armenian SSR) was an actor and an Honored Artist of the Armenian SSR (1935). He is one of the founders of the Azerbaijan theater in Yerevan.

== Life ==
Yunis Haji Suleiman oglu Suleymanov was born on January 23, 1878, in Erivan. He started playing in the theater in 1896 in Erivan and worked in the Yerevan Azerbaijan Theater until the end of his life.

He played such roles as Haji Kara ("Haji Kara", Mirza Fatali Akhundov), Soltan bey ("Arshin Mal Alan", Uzeyir Hajibeyov), a doctor ("The Doctor in Love" Jean Baptiste Molière), Atakishi, Allahverdi ("Sevil", "In 1905", Jafar Jabbarly), Giko ("Pepo", Gabriel Sundukian), Sheikh Nasrullah ("The Deads", Jalil Mammadguluzadeh) and others. Yunis Nuri also played in the movie. He starred in such films as "Khas-push", "Zangezur", "Fishermen of Sevana", "Anait" and others.

He died on January 5, 1950, in Yerevan.

== See also ==
- Yerevan state Azerbaijan dramatic theater

== Sources ==
- Кулиева, Дж. (1981). Јунис Нури. Baku: Главная редакция Азербайджанской советской энциклопедии.
