= Bakhshi Galandarli =

Azerbaijani actor

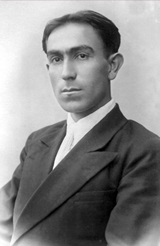
- Born: 20 July 1903; Khankendi, Russian Empire
- Died: 14 September 1985 (aged 82); Nakhchivan, USSR
- Education: Baku Theater School; Russian State Institute of Performing Arts
- Occupation(s): Theatrical figure, actor, director

Bakhshi Galandarli (20 July 1903, Khankendi, Russian Empire – 14 September 1985, Baku, Azerbaijan SSR) was an Azerbaijani theatrical figure, actor and director. He was an Honored Art Worker of the Armenian and Azerbaijan SSRs.

== Life ==
He graduated from the Baku Theater School, where he studied from 1926 to 1930. From 1930 to 1934 he studied at the Russian State Institute of Performing Arts. From 1934 to 1951 he was the chief director of the Yerevan state Azerbaijan dramatic theater. In 1939 he was awarded the title of Honored Art Worker of the Armenian SSR. From 1964 to 1982, he worked intermittently as a stage director, chief director and chief administrator of the Nakhchivan State Musical Dramatic Theatre. He staged works by Samad Vurgun, Jalil Mammadguluzadeh, Mirza Fatali Akhundov, Najaf bey Vazirov, Suleyman Sani Akhundov, Ilyas Afandiyev, Alexander Shirvanzade, Boris Lavrenyov, Vsevolod Ivanov, Carlo Goldoni, Konstantin Simonov, Alexander Ostrovsky, Uzeyir Hajibeyov, Mammed Said Ordubadi, and Said Rustamov.

About the staging of the performance Mehseti (1964) by the poet Kamala Agayeva (dedicated to Mehseti Ganjavi) in the Nakhichevan Theater, theater critic Jafar Jafarov writes:

Experienced director Bakhshi Galandarli refused from a detailed depiction of the historical environment, from lush scenery, bright costumes and colorful accessories. The play attracted attention with the simplicity of the director's handwriting and economy of visual aids. It convincingly showed the clash of two worldviews, two philosophical principles: optimism and asceticism, which is respectively symbolized by the images of the Mosque and Kharabat. Jafar Jafarov. Азербайджанский театр / Red. A. Anastasiyeva. — История советского драматического театра: Наука, 1966. — Vol. 2. — p. 291.

He died on 14 September 1985, in Nakhchivan and was buried in Erivan.

== Awards ==
- Order of the Badge of Honour (twice)
- Honored Art Worker of the Armenian SSR (1939)
- Honored Artist of the Azerbaijan SSR (1974)
