= Alexandropol uezd =

Coordinates: 40°47′22″N 43°50′51″E

Alexandropol uezd Александропольский уезд
- Uezd
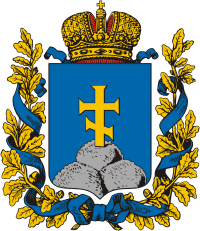
- Coat of arms

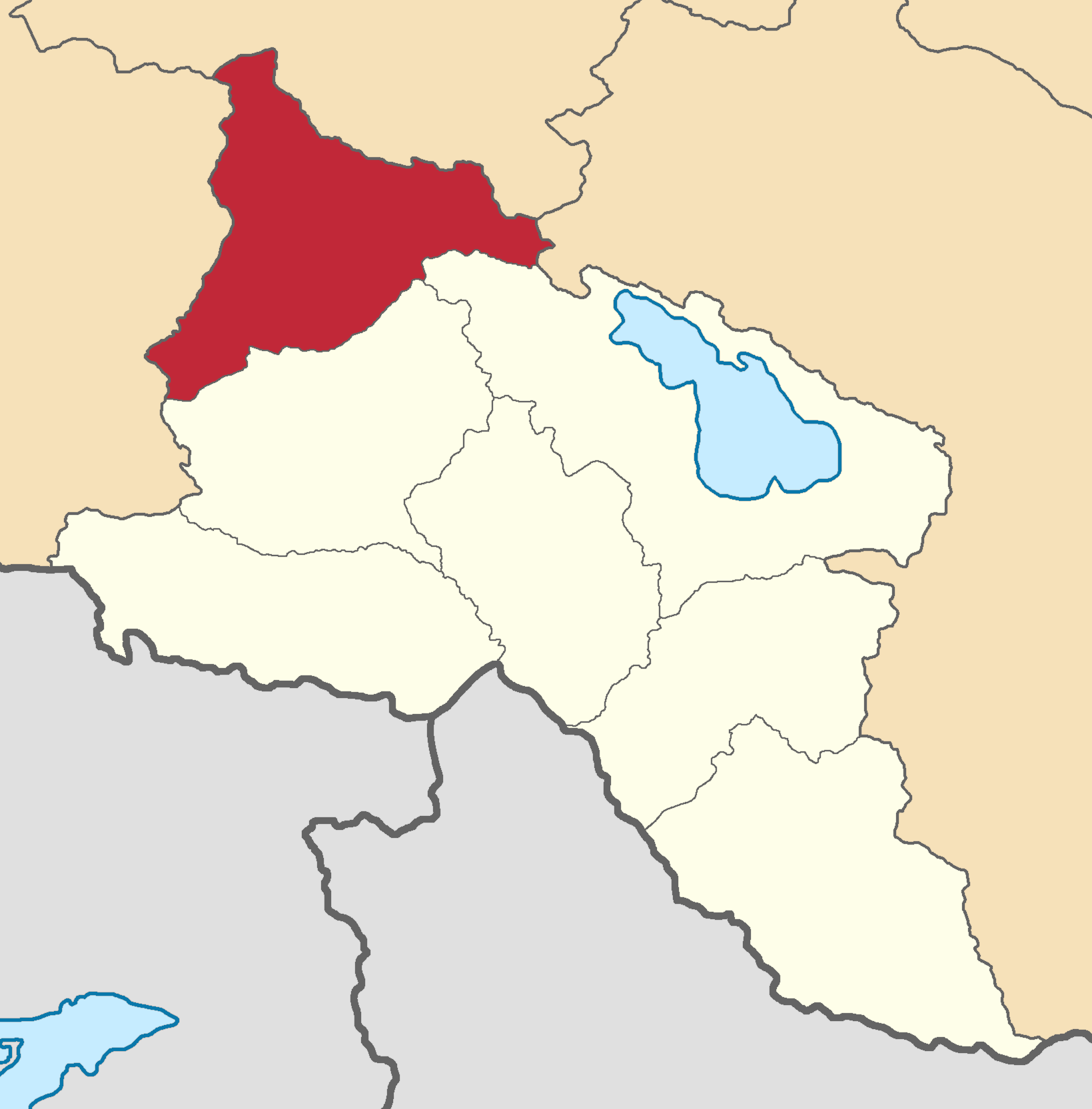
- Location in the Erivan Governorate
- Country: Russian Empire
- Viceroyalty: Caucasus
- Governorate: Erivan
- Established: 1840
- Abolished: 1929
- Capital: Aleksandropol (present-day Gyumri)

Area
  - Total: 3,854.28 km^{2} (1,488.15 sq mi)

Population (1916)
  - Total: 226,080
  - Density: 58.657/km^{2} (151.92/sq mi)
  - Urban: 22.94%
  - Rural: 77.06%

The Alexandropol uezd, (Note: Russian: Александропольский уезд, pre-reform orthography: Александропольскій уѣздъ, romanized: Aleksandropolskiy uyezd [ɐlʲɪksəndrəpəlʲskʲɪj ʊ(j)ɪst]; Armenian: Ալեքսանդրապոլի գավառ, classical orthography: Ալեքսանդրապոլի գաւառ, romanized: Alekʼsandrapoli gawaṙ [ɑlekʰsɑndɹɑpoˈli ɡɑˈvɑr] (Note: Western Armenian pronunciation: [ɑlekʰsɑndɹɑboˈli kʰɑˈvɑr])) known after 1924 as the Leninakan uezd, (Note: Russian: Ленинаканский уезд, romanized: Leninakanskiy uyezd [lʲɪnʲɪnəkənskʲɪj ʊ(j)ɪst]; Armenian: Լենինականի գավառ, romanized: Leninakani gavaṙ [leninɑˈkɑni ɡɑˈvɑr] (Note: Western Armenian pronunciation: [leninɑˈɡɑni kʰɑˈvɑr])) was a county (uezd) of the Erivan Governorate of the Caucasus Viceroyalty of the Russian Empire. The uezd bordered the governorate's Etchmiadzin and Nor Bayazet uezds to the south, the Borchaly and Akhalkalaki uezds of the Tiflis Governorate to the north, the Kazakh uezd of the Elizavetpol Governorate to the east, and the Kars Oblast to the west. The area of the uezd included most of the contemporary Shirak Province, and southern parts of the Lori Province of Armenia. The district was eponymously named for its administrative center, Aleksandropol (present-day Gyumri), which at the time was a major railway hub of the Russian South Caucasus.

== History ==
The district of Alexandropol was established in 1840 as part of the Georgia-Imeretia Governorate of the Caucasus Viceroyalty, owing its name to its administrative capital, Alexandropol, which was renamed from Kumayri in 1837 during a visit of Tsar Nicholas I in honor of his wife Alexandra Feodorovna. In 1849, the Alexandropol uezd was assigned to the succeeding Tiflis Governorate, and later, by 1849, the county was transferred to the Erivan Governorate.

Following the Russian Revolution and the signing of the Treaty of Brest-Litovsk, local Armenian forces led by General Tovmas Nazabekian in early 1918 fought to defend Alexandropol and its surrounds against the invading Ottoman Third Army, commanded by General Vehib Pasha. The Treaty of Batum which was imposed on the newly created Armenian republic stripped it of the Alexandropol uezd, assigning the district to the Ottoman Empire, which sought complete control over the city of Alexandropol for its vitally important railway junction connecting to Julfa and Persia where the Ottoman Army was active.

The city including its strategically important fortress and railway was unoccupied after months of occupation by the last Ottoman troops on 5 December 1918, following the Mudros Armistice in which the Ottoman Army was compelled to withdraw from parts of the former Russian Transcaucasus. After the Ottoman evacuation which was overseen by Mehmed Alfa, rubble cluttered the streets, homes had been looted and hundreds of thousands of animals were taken away, thus depriving the district of its ability to produce agricultural output.

After Alexandropol and its peripheries had been incorporated into Armenia, some 60,000 Armenians refugees exiled from the Kars Oblast gathered in the city, sheltering in the old Russian army barracks as they awaited permission to cross the Arpachay (Akhuryan) river to return to their homes.

During the Armenian-Turkish war, the city was again occupied by Turkish forces on 7 November 1920 and served as the place of negotiations between General Kâzım Karabekir and a delegation of the Armenian government led by Prime Minister Simon Vratsian. On 3 December 1920, the eponymous Treaty of Alexandropol was signed in the city, in which Armenia rescinded its claims to lands west of the Akhuryan and Aras rivers.

Some time after the establishment of Soviet power in Armenia, the district and city of Alexandropol were renamed to Leninakan in honor of Bolshevik leader Vladimir Lenin. By 1930, the uezd was reorganized into the raions of Ani, Akhuryan, Amasia, Aragats, Artik, Ashotsk, Gugark, and Spitak.

== Administrative divisions ==
The subcounties (uchastoks) of the Alexandropol uezd in 1913 were as follows:

Name	1912 population	Area
1-y uchastok (1-й участок)	49,847	840.89 square versts (956.99 km^{2}; 369.49 mi^{2})
2-y uchastok (2-й участок)	39,643	832.79 square versts (947.77 km^{2}; 365.93 mi^{2})
3-y uchastok (3-й участок)	32,616	815.50 square versts (928.09 km^{2}; 358.34 mi^{2})
4-y uchastok (4-й участок)	42,223	897.52 square versts (1,021.43 km^{2}; 394.38 mi^{2})

== Demographics ==
=== Russian Empire Census ===
According to the Russian Empire Census, the Alexandropol uezd had a population of 165,503 on 28 January [O.S. 15 January] 1897, including 89,482 men and 76,021 women. The majority of the population indicated Armenian to be their mother tongue, with significant Tatar, (Note: Before 1918, Azerbaijanis were generally known as "Tatars". This term, employed by the Russians, referred to Turkic-speaking Muslims of the South Caucasus. After 1918, with the establishment of the Azerbaijan Democratic Republic and "especially during the Soviet era", the Tatar group identified itself as "Azerbaijani".) Russian, and Kurdish speaking minorities.

Linguistic composition of the Alexandropol uezd in 1897
Language	Native speakers	%
Armenian	141,522	85.51
Tatar	7,832	4.73
Russian	5,672	3.43
Kurdish	4,976	3.01
Ukrainian	1,115	0.67
Greek	1,082	0.65
Polish	972	0.59
Jewish	450	0.27
Italian	325	0.20
Lithuanian	318	0.19
Georgian	267	0.16
Turkish	235	0.14
Persian	126	0.08
German	105	0.06
Belarusian	49	0.03
Assyrian	34	0.02
Mordovian	12	0.01
Tat	1	0.00
Other	410	0.25
TOTAL	165,503	100.00

=== Kavkazskiy kalendar ===
According to the 1917 publication of Kavkazskiy kalendar, the Alexandropol uezd had a population of 226,080 on 14 January [O.S. 1 January] 1916, including 119,473 men and 106,607 women, 214,044 of whom were the permanent population, and 12,036 were temporary residents:

Nationality	Urban		Rural		TOTAL	
Nationality	Number	%	Number	%	Number	%
Armenians	45,646	87.99	156,859	90.04	202,505	89.57
Russians	4,082	7.87	3,306	1.90	7,388	3.27
Shia Muslims (Note: Primarily Tatars.)	1,003	1.93	6,194	3.56	7,197	3.18
Yazidis	229	0.44	5,672	3.26	5,901	2.61
Sunni Muslims (Note: Primarily Turco-Tatars.)	0	0.00	1,983	1.14	1,983	0.88
Asiatic Christians	421	0.81	72	0.04	493	0.22
Other Europeans	269	0.52	73	0.04	342	0.15
Jews	129	0.25	25	0.01	154	0.07
Kurds	71	0.14	0	0.00	71	0.03
Roma	24	0.05	22	0.01	46	0.02
TOTAL	51,874	100.00	174,206	100.00	226,080	100.00

=== Soviet census (1926) ===
According to the 1926 Soviet Census, the population of the uezd was 166,793, of whom, Armenians were 146.257 (87.7%), Turks – 147 (0.1%), Kurds – 7,469 (4.5%), and Russians – 2,041 (1.2%).

== Bibliography ==
- Bournoutian, George A. (2018). Armenia and Imperial Decline: The Yerevan Province, 1900–1914. Milton Park, Abingdon, Oxon: Routledge. ISBN 978-1-351-06260-2. OCLC 1037283914.
- Hovannisian, Richard G. (1971). The Republic of Armenia. Vol. 1: The First Year, 1918–1919. Berkeley: University of California Press. ISBN 978-0520019843.
- Кавказский календарь на 1913 год [Caucasian calendar for 1913] (in Russian) (68th ed.). Tiflis: Tipografiya kantselyarii Ye.I.V. na Kavkaze, kazenny dom. 1913. Archived from the original on 19 April 2022.
- Кавказский календарь на 1917 год [Caucasian calendar for 1917] (in Russian) (72nd ed.). Tiflis: Tipografiya kantselyarii Ye.I.V. na Kavkaze, kazenny dom. 1917. Archived from the original on 4 November 2021.
- Kazemzadeh, Firuz (1951). The Struggle for Transcaucasia (1917–1921). New York City: Philosophical Library. OCLC 1943521.
- Tsutsiev, Arthur (2014). Atlas of the Ethno-Political History of the Caucasus (PDF). Translated by Nora Seligman Favorov. New Haven: Yale University Press. ISBN 9780300153088. Archived (PDF) from the original on 17 June 2023.
