= Yerevan Azerbaijan Pedagogical School =

Yerevan Azerbaijan Pedagogical School İrəvan Azərbaycan Pedaqoji Məktəbi

Information
- Established: 1924
- Closed: 1948

Yerevan Azerbaijan Pedagogical School or Yerevan Azerbaijan Pedagogical Technical College (Azerbaijani: İrəvan Azərbaycan Pedaqoji Məktəbi; İrəvan Azərbaycan Pedaqoji Texnikumu, 1924 — 1948) was the technical school that operated in the Armenian SSR; A boarding school that prepares teachers for Azerbaijani schools in Armenia.

== About ==
Yerevan Azerbaijan Pedagogical Technical College was established in Yerevan in 1924. In 1930–1935, 102 students and teachers of the technical school were subjected to repression in the names of "bey", "khan", "landlord", "golchomag", "kulak".

Since 1936, the college had been named Yerevan Azerbaijan Pedagogical School.

More than 100,000 Azerbaijanis were deported from Armenia by the decisions of the Council of Ministers of the Soviet Union dated December 23, 1947 and March 10, 1948. In 1948, along with the resettlement of the Azerbaijani population, the Yerevan Azerbaijani Pedagogical School and the Azerbaijani branch of the Yerevan State Pedagogical Institute were also deported. The Yerevan Azerbaijan Pedagogical School was transferred to the Khanlar District of Azerbaijan, and the Azerbaijani branch of the Yerevan State Pedagogical Institute was transferred to the city of Baku, to the relevant faculties of the current Azerbaijan State Pedagogical University.
