= Sayat-Nova, Armenia =

Sayat-Nova Սայաթ-Նովա
- Location within Armenia Location within Ararat
- Coordinates: 40°04′27″N 44°23′51″E
- Country: Armenia
- Province: Ararat
- Municipality: Masis

Population (2011)
  - Total: 1,886
- Time zone: UTC+4
  - Summer (DST): UTC+5

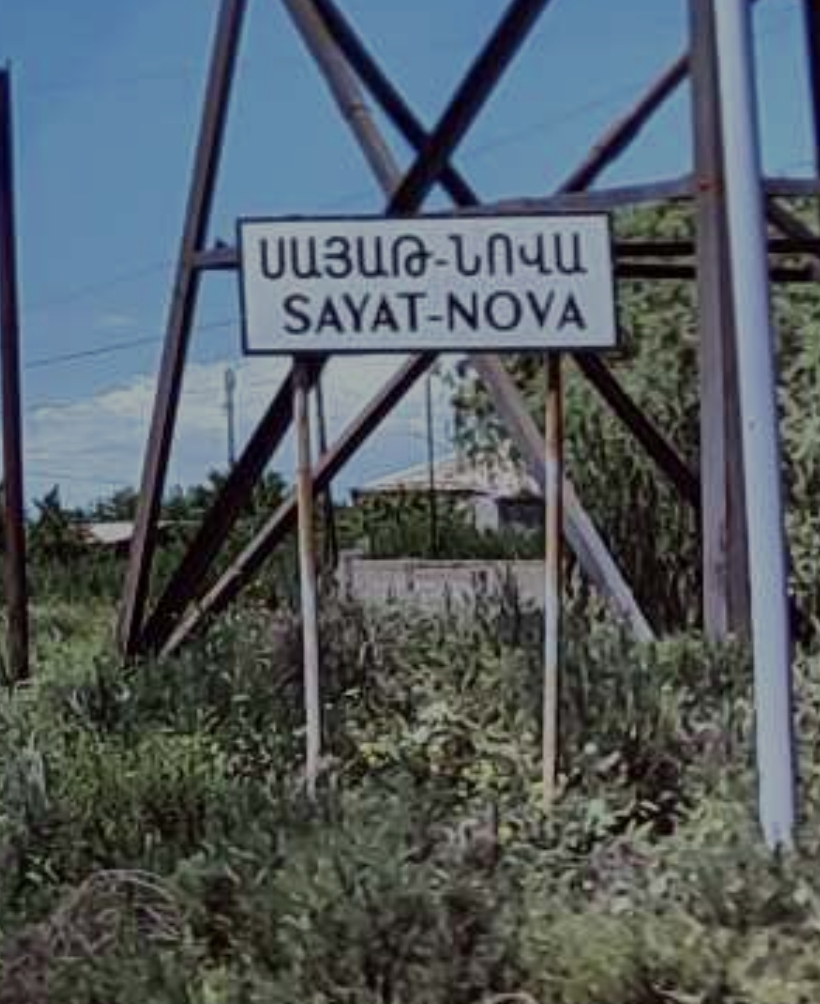
Sign at the entrance of Sayat-Nova.

Sayat-Nova (Armenian: Սայաթ-Նովա; Azerbaijani: Aşağı Necili) is a village in the Masis Municipality of the Ararat Province of Armenia. The town was populated by Azerbaijanis before the exodus of Azerbaijanis from Armenia after the outbreak of the Nagorno-Karabakh conflict. In 1988–1989 Armenian refugees from Azerbaijan settled in the village. It was renamed Sayat-Nova after the poet by the same name.
