= Lchap =

Village in Gegharkunik, Armenia

Lchap Լճափ
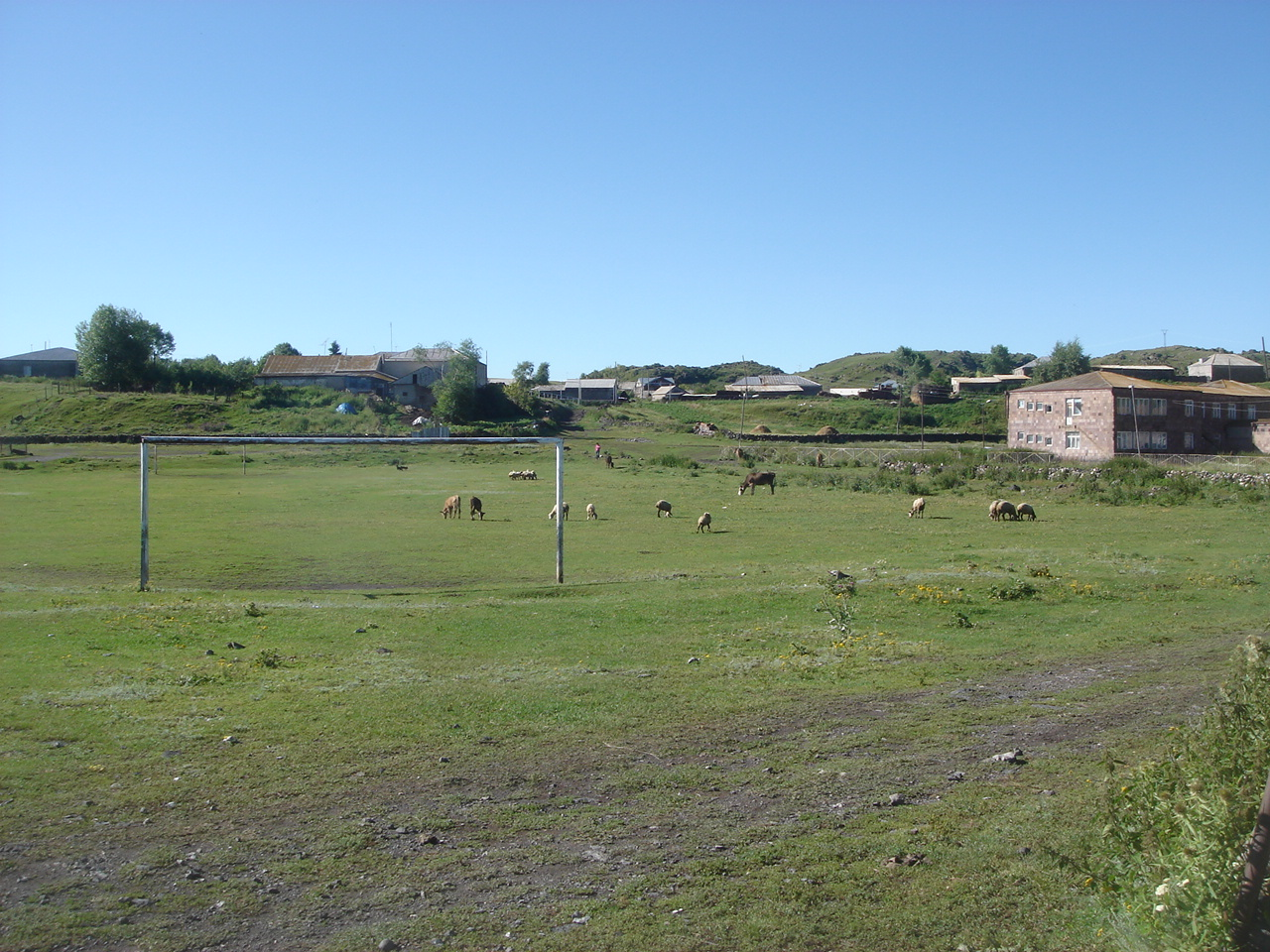

- Location within Armenia Location within Gegharkunik
- Coordinates: 40°27′40″N 45°03′54″E
- Country: Armenia
- Province: Gegharkunik
- Municipality: Gavar

Population (2011)
  - Total: 982
- Time zone: UTC+4 (AMT)

Lchap (Armenian: Լճափ) is a village in the Gavar Municipality of the Gegharkunik Province of Armenia.

== Etymology ==
The village was known as Agzibir, Aghzibir, and Kiziljik until 1945.
