= Sovet Ermenistani =

Sovet Ermenistani Совет Ермәнистаны
- Founded: January 7, 1921
- Ceased publication: 1989
- Language: Azerbaijani
- Headquarters: Erivan

Sovet Ermenistani (Azerbaijani: Sovet Ermənistanı, Cyrillic: Совет Ермәнистаны) was the republican newspaper in Azerbaijani in the Armenian SSR. The body of the Central Committee of the Communist Party of Armenia, the Supreme Soviet of the Armenian SSR and the Council of Ministers.

== About ==
After the establishment of the Soviet power in Armenia, the issue of creating a Communist-Bolshevik press was first of all necessary. On January 7, 1921, the weekly Kommunist newspaper in the Azerbaijani was published in Yerevan. Kommunist newspaper was published from January 7 to February 8, 1921. The newspaper continued to be published under the editorship of Hamid Ganizade until February 8. On February 9, 1921, the editorial office of Kommunist newspaper was burned and destroyed by Dashnaks. With that, the newspaper's activity was stopped.

The newspaper was published under the name Kommunist in 1921, Ranjbar in 1922, Zangi in 1925, Gyzyl Shafaq in 1929, again Kommunist in 1937, and Sovet Ermenistani in 1939. Jafar Valibeyov, member of the Central Committee of the Communist Party of Armenia, deputy of the Supreme Soviet of the USSR and Armenian SSR, deputy chairman of the Presidium of the Supreme Soviet of the Armenian SSR, Rza Valibeyov, deputy Minister of Education of the Armenian SSR, the first secretary of the Vedi District Party Committee, Habib Hasanov, deputy of the Supreme Soviet of the USSR and Armenian SSR, the first sirst Secretary of the Amasia District Party Committee, Maharram Bayramov, deputy chairman of the Presidium of the Armenian SSR, member of the Central Committee, deputy of the Supreme Soviet of the USSR, Jahangir Aliyev, deputy of the Supreme Soviet of the USSR and Armenian SSR, the first sirst Secretary of the Amasia District Party Committee, Zarbali Gurbanov, deputy of the Supreme Soviet of the USSR and Armenian SSR, the first sirst Secretary of the Amasia District Party Committee, Israfil Mammadov, Honored Journalist of the Armenian SSR, were the editor-in-chief of the newspaper in certain periods.
