= Etchmiadzin uezd =

Coordinates: 40°10′22″N 44°17′33″E

Etchmiadzin uezd Эчмиадзинский уезд
- Uezd
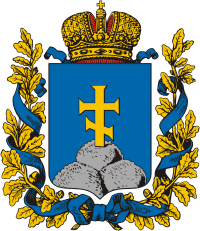
- Coat of arms

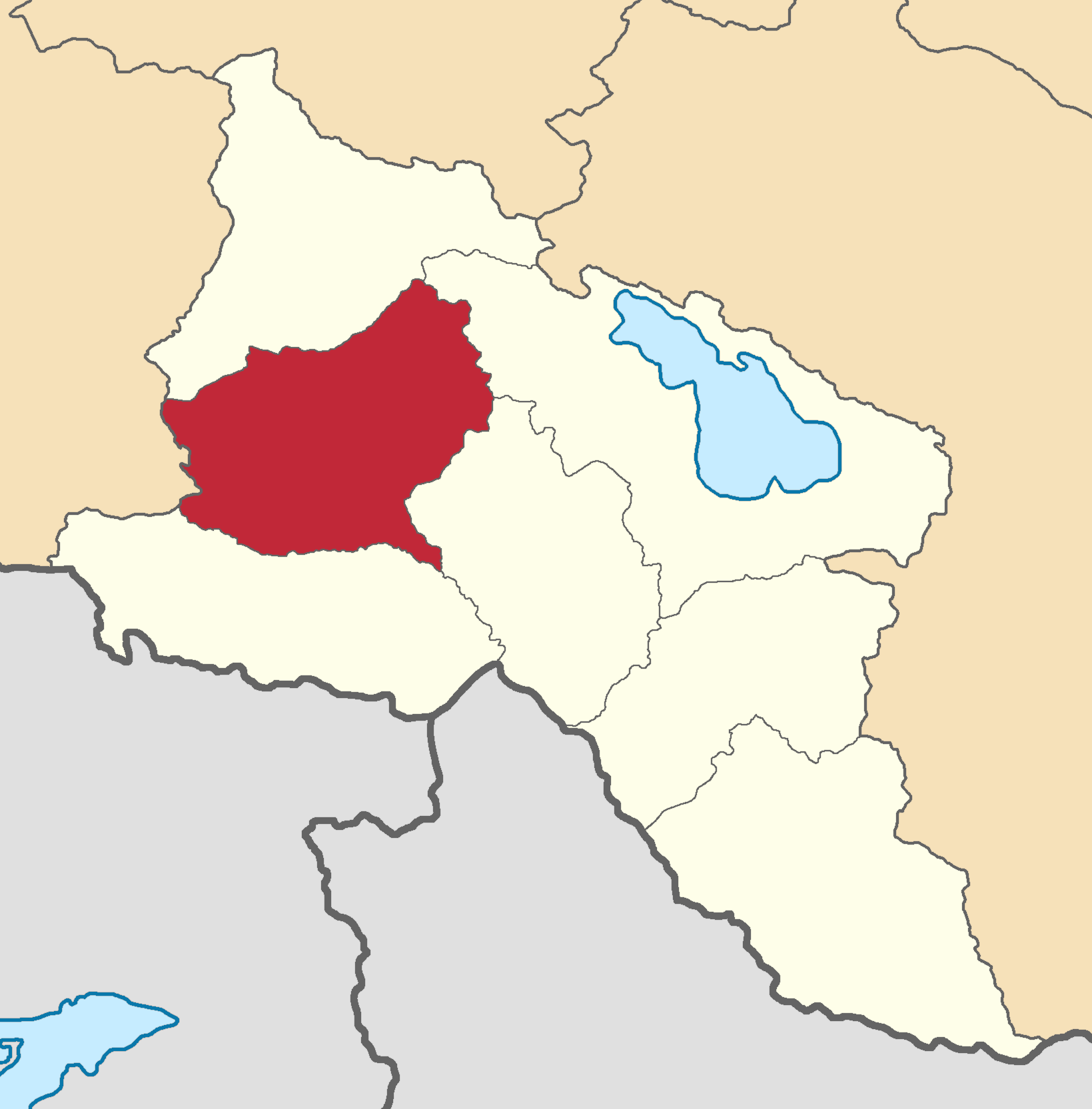
- Location in the Erivan Governorate
- Country: Russian Empire
- Viceroyalty: Caucasus
- Governorate: Erivan
- Established: 1849
- Abolished: 1930
- Capital: Vagharshapat

Area
  - Total: 3,684.36 km^{2} (1,422.54 sq mi)

Population (1916)
  - Total: 167,786
  - Density: 45.5401/km^{2} (117.948/sq mi)
  - Rural: 100.00%

The Etchmiadzin uezd (Note: Russian: Эчміадзи́нскій уѣ́здъ, romanized: Echmiadzínsky uyézd; Armenian: Էջմիածնի գավառ, romanized: Ēǰmiaçni gavaṙ; Azerbaijani: اچمیاجین قضاسی, romanized: Eçmiyācın qaz̤āsı) was a county (uezd) of the Erivan Governorate of the Caucasus Viceroyalty of the Russian Empire. The uezd bordered the Alexandropol uezd to the north, the Nor Bayazet uezd to the east, Erivan uezd to the north, the Surmalu uezd to the south, and the Kars Oblast to the west. It included all of the Armavir Province and most of the Aragatsotn Province of present-day Armenia. The administrative centre of the county was Vagharshapat, also referred to as Etchmiadzin—the administrative capital of the Armenian Apostolic Church.

== Administrative divisions ==
The subcounties (uchastoks) of the Ejmiatsin uezd in 1913 were as follows:

Name	1912 population	Area
1-y uchastok (1-й участок)	35,411	820.62 square versts (933.92 km^{2}; 360.59 mi^{2})
2-y uchastok (2-й участок)	56,711	431.09 square versts (490.61 km^{2}; 189.42 mi^{2})
3-y uchastok (3-й участок)	31,332	982.43 square versts (1,118.07 km^{2}; 431.69 mi^{2})
4-y uchastok (4-й участок)	33,469	1,003.26 square versts (1,141.77 km^{2}; 440.84 mi^{2})

== Demographics ==
=== Russian Empire Census ===
According to the Russian Empire Census, the Etchmiadzin uezd had a population of 124,237 on 28 January [O.S. 15 January] 1897, including 65,072 men and 59,165 women. The majority of the population indicated Armenian to be their mother tongue, with significant Tatar (Note: Before 1918, Azerbaijanis were generally known as "Tatars". This term, employed by the Russians, referred to Turkic-speaking Muslims of the South Caucasus. After 1918, with the establishment of the Azerbaijan Democratic Republic and "especially during the Soviet era", the Tatar group identified itself as "Azerbaijani".) and Kurdish speaking minorities.

Linguistic composition of the Etchmiadzin uezd in 1897
Language	Native speakers	%
Armenian	77,572	62.44
Tatar	35,999	28.98
Kurdish	9,724	7.83
Tat	439	0.35
Assyrian	198	0.16
Russian	94	0.08
Ukrainian	81	0.07
Georgian	51	0.04
Jewish	27	0.02
Turkish	9	0.01
Persian	8	0.01
Polish	8	0.01
Greek	5	0.00
German	2	0.00
Other	20	0.02
TOTAL	124,237	100.00

=== Kavkazskiy kalendar ===
According to the 1917 publication of Kavkazskiy kalendar, the Etchmiadzin uezd had a population of 167,786 on 14 January [O.S. 1 January] 1916, including 86,716 men and 81,070 women, 148,794 of whom were the permanent population, and 18,992 were temporary residents. The statistics indicated an overwhelmingly Armenian population with sizeable Shia Muslim and Kurdish minorities:

Nationality	Number	%
Armenians	115,026	68.56
Shia Muslims (Note: Primarily Tatars.)	41,310	24.62
Kurds	9,653	5.75
Yazidis	1,118	0.67
Roma	410	0.24
Asiatic Christians	186	0.11
Jews	42	0.03
Russians	41	0.02
TOTAL	167,786	100.00

== Bibliography ==
- Bournoutian, George A. (2018). Armenia and Imperial Decline: The Yerevan Province, 1900–1914. Milton Park, Abingdon, Oxon: Routledge. ISBN 978-1-351-06260-2. OCLC 1037283914.
- Hovannisian, Richard G. (1971). The Republic of Armenia. Vol. 1: The First Year, 1918–1919. Berkeley: University of California Press. ISBN 978-0520019843.
- Кавказский календарь на 1913 год [Caucasian calendar for 1913] (in Russian) (68th ed.). Tiflis: Tipografiya kantselyarii Ye.I.V. na Kavkaze, kazenny dom. 1913. Archived from the original on 19 April 2022.
- Кавказский календарь на 1917 год [Caucasian calendar for 1917] (in Russian) (72nd ed.). Tiflis: Tipografiya kantselyarii Ye.I.V. na Kavkaze, kazenny dom. 1917. Archived from the original on 4 November 2021.
- Tsutsiev, Arthur (2014). Atlas of the Ethno-Political History of the Caucasus (PDF). Translated by Nora Seligman Favorov. New Haven: Yale University Press. ISBN 9780300153088. Archived (PDF) from the original on 17 June 2023.
