= Shatvan =

Village in Gegharkunik, Armenia

Shatvan Շատվան
- Location within Armenia Location within Gegharkunik
- Coordinates: 40°10′59″N 45°49′32″E
- Country: Armenia
- Province: Gegharkunik
- Municipality: Vardenis

Population (2011)
  - Total: 612
- Time zone: UTC+4 (AMT)

Shatvan (Armenian: Շատվան) is a village in the Gegharkunik Province of Armenia. Khachkars and church ruins have been preserved in the village.

== History ==
The local cemetery dates to the 15th-16th centuries.

== Notable people ==
- Talib Musayev
