= Alvar, Armenia =

Village in Shirak, Armenia

Alvar Ալվար
- Location within Armenia Location within Shirak
- Coordinates: 41°03′03″N 43°44′57″E
- Country: Armenia
- Province: Shirak
- Municipality: Amasia
- Elevation: 1,980 m (6,500 ft)

Population (2011)
  - Total: 140
- Time zone: UTC+4
- Climate: Dfb

Alvar (Armenian: Ալվար) is a village in the Amasia Municipality of the Shirak Province of Armenia.

== History ==
Some of the ancestors of the village population emigrated from Western Armenia in 1828-1830. The village was mostly populated by Azerbaijanis. In 1988-1989, during the Nagorno-Karabakh conflict, local Azeris moved to Azerbaijan, and Armenian families resettled in the village.

== Demographics ==
The Statistical Committee of Armenia reported the community's population was 168 in 2010, up from 147 at the 2001 census. As of January 2013, the villages' population is 243.

The population of the village since 1886 is as follows:

Historical population
Year	Pop.	±% p.a.
1886	348	—
1931	468	+0.66%
1959	366	−0.87%
1970	528	+3.39%
1979	630	+1.98%
1989	154	−13.14%
2001	147	−0.39%
2011	140	−0.49%
2013	243	+31.75%
