= Agarakavan =

Agarakavan Ագարակավան
- Location within Armenia Location within Aragatsotn
- Coordinates: 40°20′00″N 44°04′00″E
- Country: Armenia
- Province: Aragatsotn
- Municipality: Talin
- Founded: 1920

Population (2011)
  - Total: 881
- Time zone: UTC+4
  - Summer (DST): UTC+5

Agarakavan (Armenian: Ագարակավան) is a village in the Talin Municipality of the Aragatsotn Province of Armenia. It was populated by Armenian genocide survivors from Van in 1920.
