= Nor Bayazet uezd =

Coordinates: 40°21′32″N 45°07′36″E

Nor Bayazet uezd Новобаязетский уезд
- Uezd
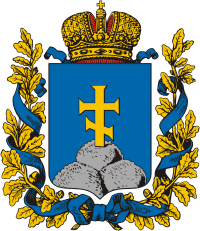
- Coat of arms

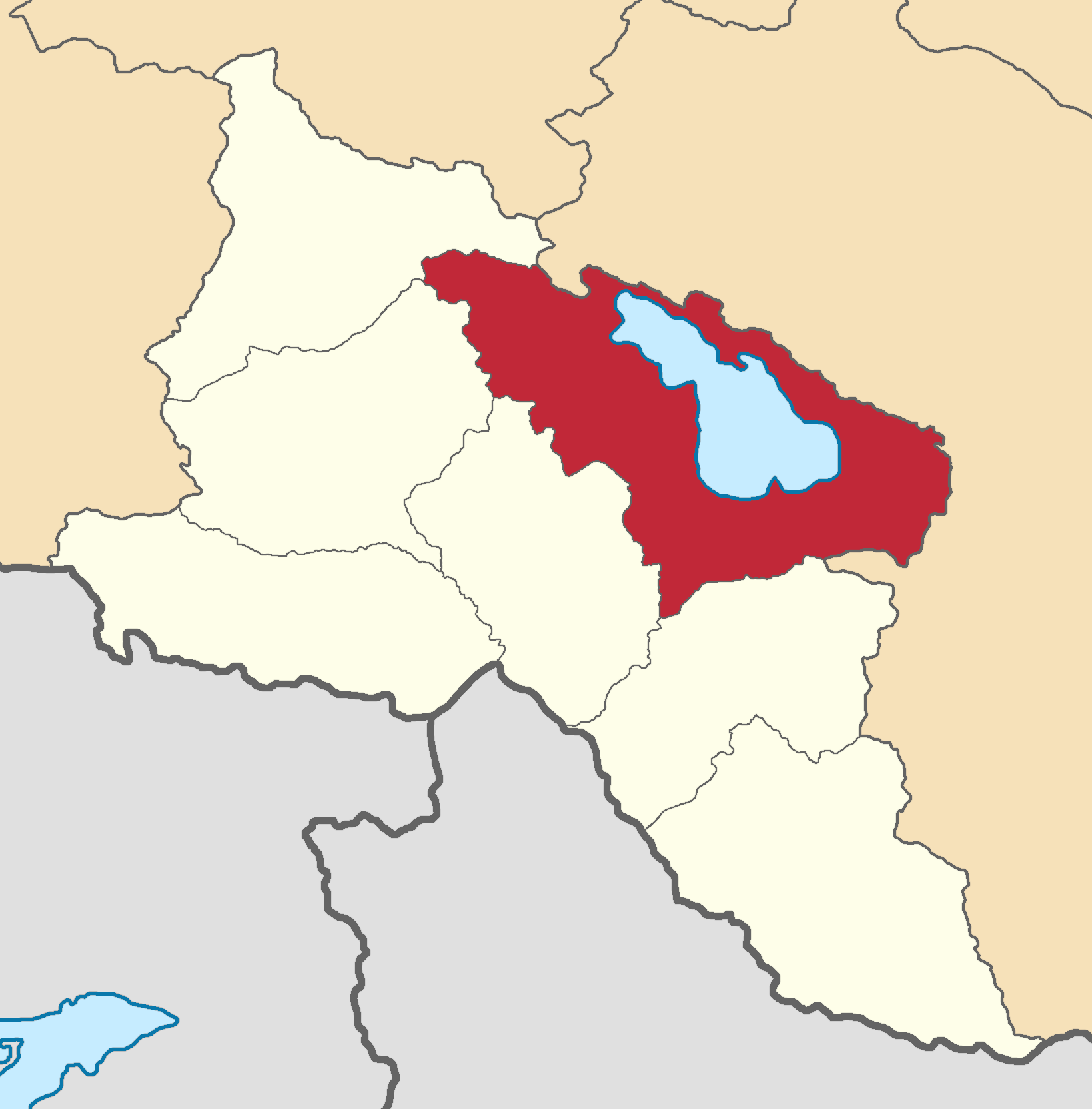
- Location in the Erivan Governorate
- Country: Russian Empire
- Viceroyalty: Caucasus
- Governorate: Erivan
- Established: 1840
- Abolished: 1930
- Capital: Novobayazet (present-day Gavar)

Area
  - Total: 4,691.96 km^{2} (1,811.58 sq mi)

Population (1916)
  - Total: 188,859
  - Density: 40.2516/km^{2} (104.251/sq mi)
  - Urban: 7.81%
  - Rural: 92.19%

The Nor Bayazet or Novobayazet uezd (Note: Russian: Новобаязетский уезд, pre-reform orthography: Новобаязетскій уѣздъ, romanized: Novobayazetskiy uyezd [nəvəbə(j)ɪzʲɪt͡skʲɪj ʊ(j)ɪst]; Armenian: Նոր Բայազետի գավառ, classical orthography: Նոր Բայազէտի գաւառ, romanized: Nor Bayazēti gawaṙ [nɔɾ bɑjɑzeˈti ɡɑˈvɑr] (Note: Western Armenian pronunciation: [nɔɾ pɑjɑzeˈdi kʰɑˈvɑr]); Azerbaijani: یڭی بایزید قضاسی, romanized: Yeñī Bāyazīd qaz̤āsı) was a county (uezd) of the Erivan Governorate of the Caucasus Viceroyalty of the Russian Empire. The uezd bordered the Alexandropol uezd to the north, the Etchmiadzin and Erivan uezds to the west, the Sharur-Daralayaz uezd to the south, and the Kazakh, Elizavetpol, and Jevanshir uezds of the Elizavetpol Governorate to the east. Centered on Lake Sevan, the Nor Bayazet uezd included most of the contemporary province of Gegharkunik and northern parts of the Kotayk Province of Armenia. The administrative center of the uezd was the city Novobayazet (present-day Gavar) for which the district was eponymously named.

In 1916, the district was over 90% rural and home to over 129,300 Armenians and 53,700 Muslims (including 3,000 Kurds). Resulting from the Ottoman invasion of the South Caucasus, in 1918–1920 the population of the district contracted significantly due to famine and large-scale ethnic cleansing.

== History ==
The administrative center of the uezd, Novobayazet, as indicated by its name meaning "New Bayazıt", was founded by Armenian immigrants from Doğubayazıt in the early 19th century who accompanied the withdrawing Imperial Russian Army to escape persecution in the Ottoman Empire.

After the Russian Revolution, conditions in the Nor Bayazet uezd were worsened by the presence of 60,000 refugees in 1918. Over the winter of 1918–1919, some 25,000 people in the uezd starved to death. Whilst controlled by the First Republic of Armenia, the Nor Bayazet uezd in 1918–1919 was emptied of its Muslim population by the destruction of 100 villages by the Armenian army, however, this was instigated by agents of the Azerbaijan Democratic Republic trying to provoke ethnic clashes. Moreover, the "Nor Bayazet commission" in the Armenian parliament led by Hakob Ter-Hakobyan claimed that 88 villages and 72,000 inhabitants of Nor Bayazet had been subject to raids by Muslims.

== Administrative divisions ==
The subcounties (uchastoks) of the Nor Bayazet uezd in 1913 were as follows:

Name	1912 population	Area
1-y uchastok (1-й участок)	38,280	1,071.35 square versts (1,219.26 km^{2}; 470.76 mi^{2})
2-y uchastok (2-й участок)	31,680	650.45 square versts (740.25 km^{2}; 285.81 mi^{2})
3-y uchastok (3-й участок)	37,781	983.99 square versts (1,119.84 km^{2}; 432.37 mi^{2})
4-y uchastok (4-й участок)	46,082	1,416.97 square versts (1,612.60 km^{2}; 622.63 mi^{2})

== Demographics ==
=== Russian Empire Census ===
According to the Russian Empire census of 1897, the Nor Bayazet uezd had a population of 122,573 on 28 January [O.S. 15 January] 1897, including 63,128 men and 59,445 women. The majority of the population indicated Armenian to be their mother tongue, with a significant Tatar (Note: Before 1918, Azerbaijanis were generally known as "Tatars". This term, employed by the Russians, referred to Turkic-speaking Muslims of the South Caucasus. After 1918, with the establishment of the Azerbaijan Democratic Republic and "especially during the Soviet era", the Tatar group identified itself as "Azerbaijani".) speaking minority.

Linguistic composition of the Nor Bayazet uezd in 1897
Language	Native speakers	%
Armenian	81,285	66.32
Tatar	34,726	28.33
Kurdish	2,995	2.44
Russian	2,711	2.21
Mordovian	289	0.24
Tat	269	0.22
Greek	179	0.15
Georgian	36	0.03
Jewish	31	0.03
Polish	12	0.01
Lithuanian	6	0.00
Ukrainian	5	0.00
Assyrian	4	0.00
Italian	1	0.00
Other	24	0.02
TOTAL	122,573	100.00

=== Kavkazskiy kalendar ===
According to the 1917 publication of Kavkazskiy kalendar, the Nor Bayazet uezd had a population of 188,859 on 14 January [O.S. 1 January] 1916, including 97,864 men and 90,995 women, 174,879 of whom were the permanent population, and 13,980 were temporary residents. The statistics indicated the city of Nor Bayazet and its peripheries to be overwhelmingly Armenian, with a significant Shia Muslim minority:

Nationality	Urban		Rural		TOTAL	
Nationality	Number	%	Number	%	Number	%
Armenians	14,350	97.30	114,997	66.05	129,347	68.49
Shia Muslims (Note: Primarily Tatars.)	0	0.00	46,901	26.94	46,901	24.83
Russians	83	0.56	4,842	2.78	4,925	2.61
Sunni Muslims (Note: Primarily Turco-Tatars.)	0	0.00	3,812	2.19	3,812	2.02
Kurds	238	1.61	2,726	1.57	2,964	1.57
Yazidis	0	0.00	408	0.23	408	0.22
Other Europeans	11	0.07	387	0.22	398	0.21
Asiatic Christians	64	0.43	38	0.02	102	0.05
Jews	2	0.01	0	0.00	2	0.00
TOTAL	14,748	100.00	174,111	100.00	188,859	100.00

== Bibliography ==
- Bournoutian, George A. (2018). Armenia and Imperial Decline: The Yerevan Province, 1900–1914. Milton Park, Abingdon, Oxon: Routledge. ISBN 978-1-351-06260-2. OCLC 1037283914.
- Hovannisian, Richard G. (1971). The Republic of Armenia. Vol. 1: The First Year, 1918–1919. Berkeley: University of California Press. ISBN 978-0520019843.
- Hovannisian, Richard G. (1982). The Republic of Armenia. Vol. 2: From Versailles to London, 1919–1920. Berkeley: University of California Press. ISBN 978-0520041868.
- Кавказский календарь на 1913 год [Caucasian calendar for 1913] (in Russian) (68th ed.). Tiflis: Tipografiya kantselyarii Ye.I.V. na Kavkaze, kazenny dom. 1913. Archived from the original on 19 April 2022.
- Кавказский календарь на 1917 год [Caucasian calendar for 1917] (in Russian) (72nd ed.). Tiflis: Tipografiya kantselyarii Ye.I.V. na Kavkaze, kazenny dom. 1917. Archived from the original on 4 November 2021.
- Tsutsiev, Arthur (2014). Atlas of the Ethno-Political History of the Caucasus (PDF). Translated by Nora Seligman Favorov. New Haven: Yale University Press. ISBN 9780300153088. Archived (PDF) from the original on 17 June 2023.
