= Vardenis District =

Coordinates: 40°10′50″N 45°43′12″E

Vardenis District Վարդենիսի շրջան Варденисский район
- District
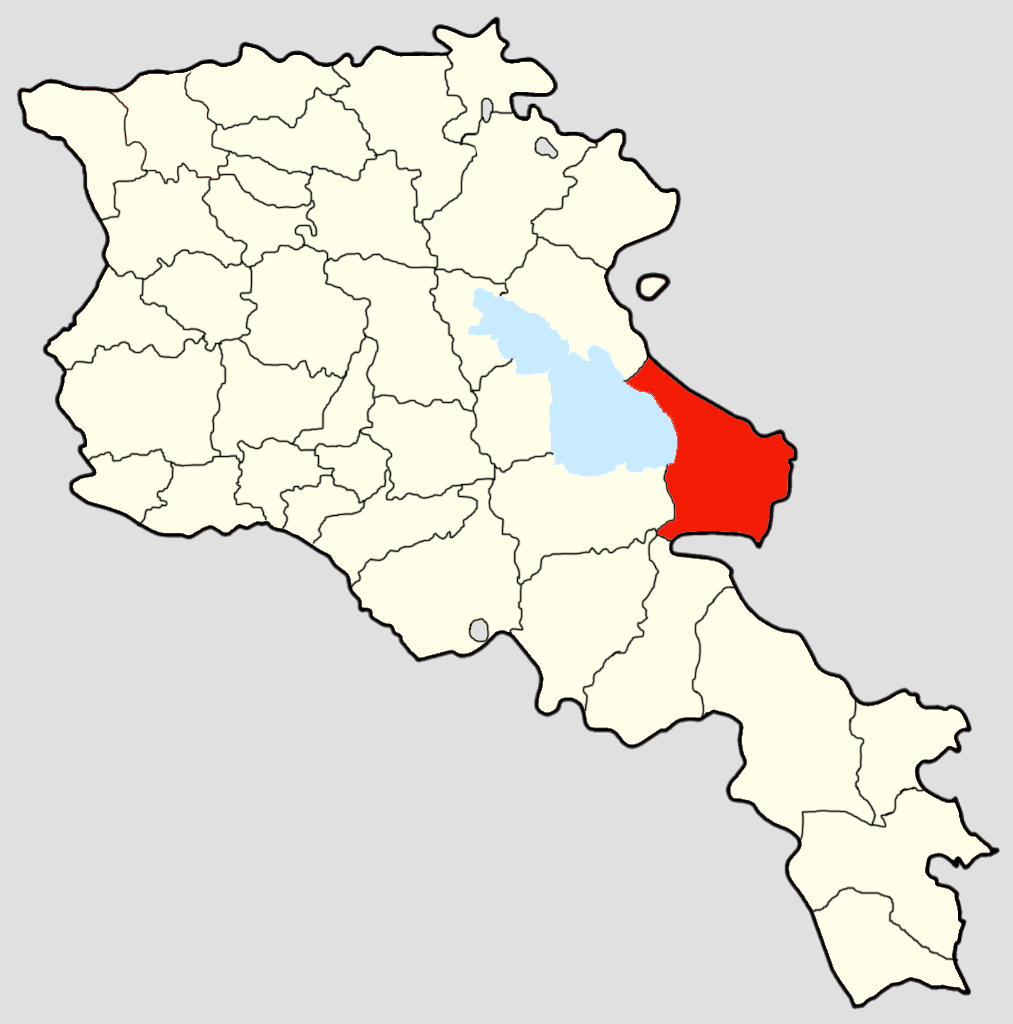
- The Vardenis District in Armenia
- Country: Armenian Soviet Socialist Republic Armenia
- Established: 1930
- Abolished: 11 April 1995
- Capital: Vardenis

Area
  - Total: 1,201.57 km^{2} (463.93 sq mi)

Population (1989)
  - Total: 31,282
  - Density: 26.034/km^{2} (67.428/sq mi)

The Vardenis District (Armenian: Վարդենիսի շրջան; Russian: Варденисский район) was a raion (district) of the Armenian Soviet Socialist Republic from 1930 and later in 1991 of the Republic of Armenia until its disestablishment in 1995. The Vardenis District today constitutes a southeastern part of the Gegharkunik Province (marz). Its administrative centre was the town of Vardenis.

== History ==
The Vardenis District was formed on the territory of the Armenian SSR in 1930, originally forming part of the Tsarist Nor Bayazet uezd.

The district and its capital were originally known as Basargechar (Armenian: Բասարգեչար; Russian: Басаргечар) before being renamed to Vardenis in 1969.

Following the dissolution of the Soviet Union, the Republic of Armenia consolidated the Vardenis, Kamo, Krasnoselsk, Martuni, and Sevan districts into the larger Gegharkunik Province in 1995.

== Demographics ==
According to the publication by the Central Statistical Committee in Yerevan (1980) titled Itogi Vsesoyuznoy Perepisi Naseleniya 1979 Goda po Armyaskoy SSR cited by Broers, in 1959, Azerbaijanis of the Vardenis District numbered 17,632 inhabitants, equal to 49.5% of the population. The number of Azerbaijanis rose to 25,781 inhabitants (52.7% of the population) in 1970 and 31,228 inhabitants (54.9%) in 1979.

Armenian former president, Serzh Sargsyan stated in an interview with Thomas de Waal that "In Vardenis and other regions, the Azerbaijanis used to be 70 percent of the population".

== Villages ==
There were 30 villages, mostly predominantly Azerbaijanis, within the territory of the district. After 1989, many of these villages was renamed and reoccupied by local farmers.

== See also ==
- Districts of the Armenian Soviet Socialist Republic
