= Yerevan state Azerbaijan dramatic theater =

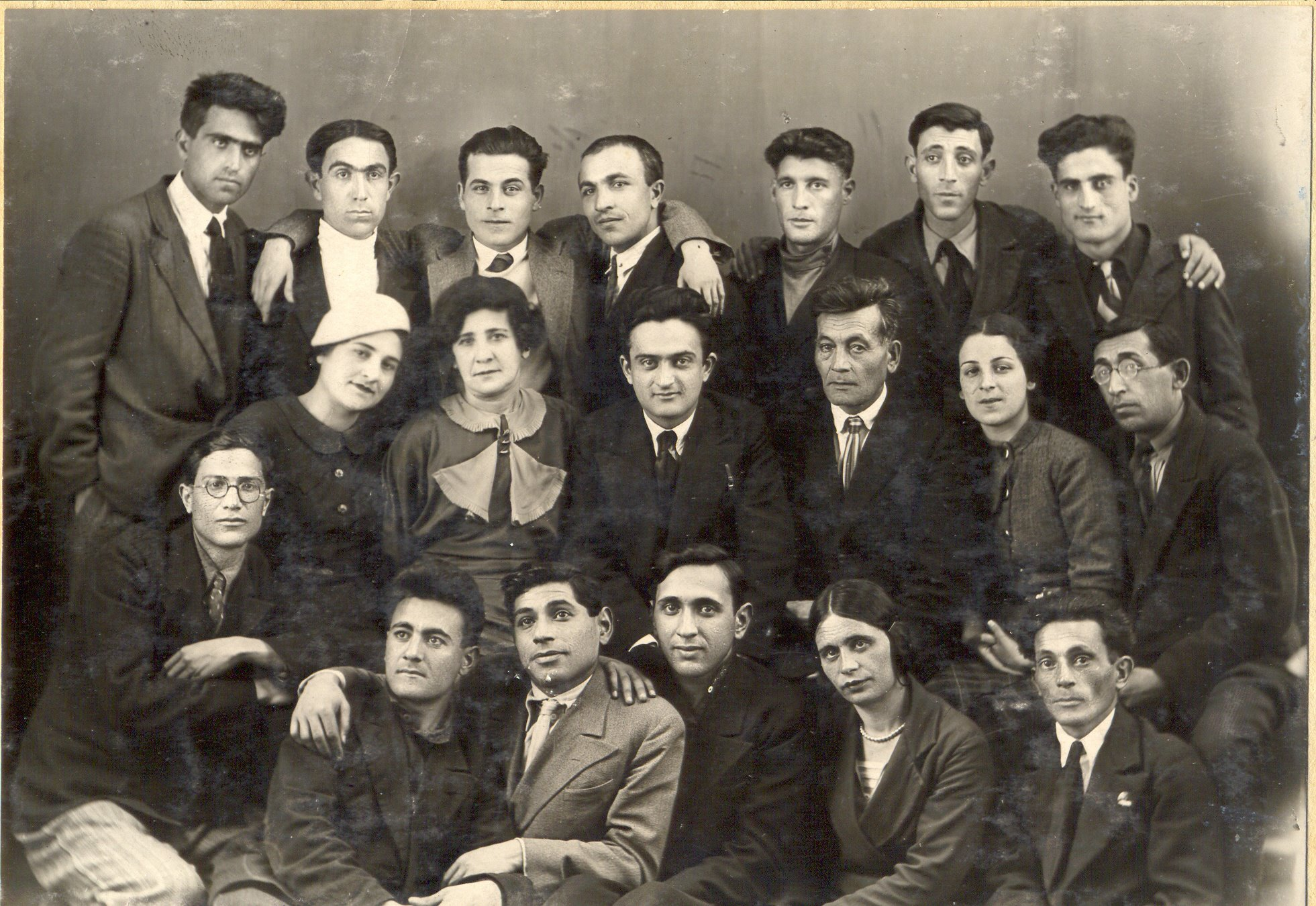
The troupe of the theater in 1937

Yerevan Azeri drama theater was named after Jafar Jabbarly (Azerbaijani: Cəfər Cabbarlı adına İrəvan Dövlət Azərbaycan Dram Teatrı) is the Azerbaijan State Drama Theater, launched in Yerevan in 1928.

During the years of 1934 - 1951 the main director of the theater was Bakhshi Galandarly. "Othello" was staged by the Yerevan drama theater named after J. Jabbarly in the "All-Union Festival of Shakespearean Performances", dedicated to the 380th anniversary of the birth of William Shakespeare in April 1944.

After a long break for several years, the theater started to work in Yerevan again in 1967. The plays such as, "Sevil" by J. Jabbarly, "Namus" by A. Shirvanzade, "Farhad and Shirin" by S. Vurgun, "Flame" by A. Erevanly and A. Suleymanov were included in repertoire of theater.

== Establishment of the theater ==
In March 1928 Yerevan Turkish theater was established under the leadership of Yunis Nuri. The theater functioned in the Armenian SSR, remaining the only Azerbaijani theater in Armenia. In the 1930s, the theater was called the "Azerbaijan state theater named after J. Jabbarly or the "Armenian State Turkish theater named after J. Jabbarly.

== Current activity ==
Since 1989 the troupe of the theater continued its activity in Baku, in the theatrical studio at the Azerbaijan Drama Theater. In 1994 the status of state was again given to the theater by the decree of the President of Azerbaijan Heydar Aliyev. Yerevan State Azerbaijan theater continues to stage plays in Azerbaijan and Georgia, Dagistan and Turkey. On 16 October 2007 the theater's anniversary was celebrated at the Azerbaijan State Musical Comedy theater in Baku by the presidential decree.

== See also ==
- Bakhshi Galandarli
