= Higher Party School =

Political school in the Soviet Union

Higher Party School under the Central Committee of the CPSU
- Высшая партийная школа при ЦК КПСС
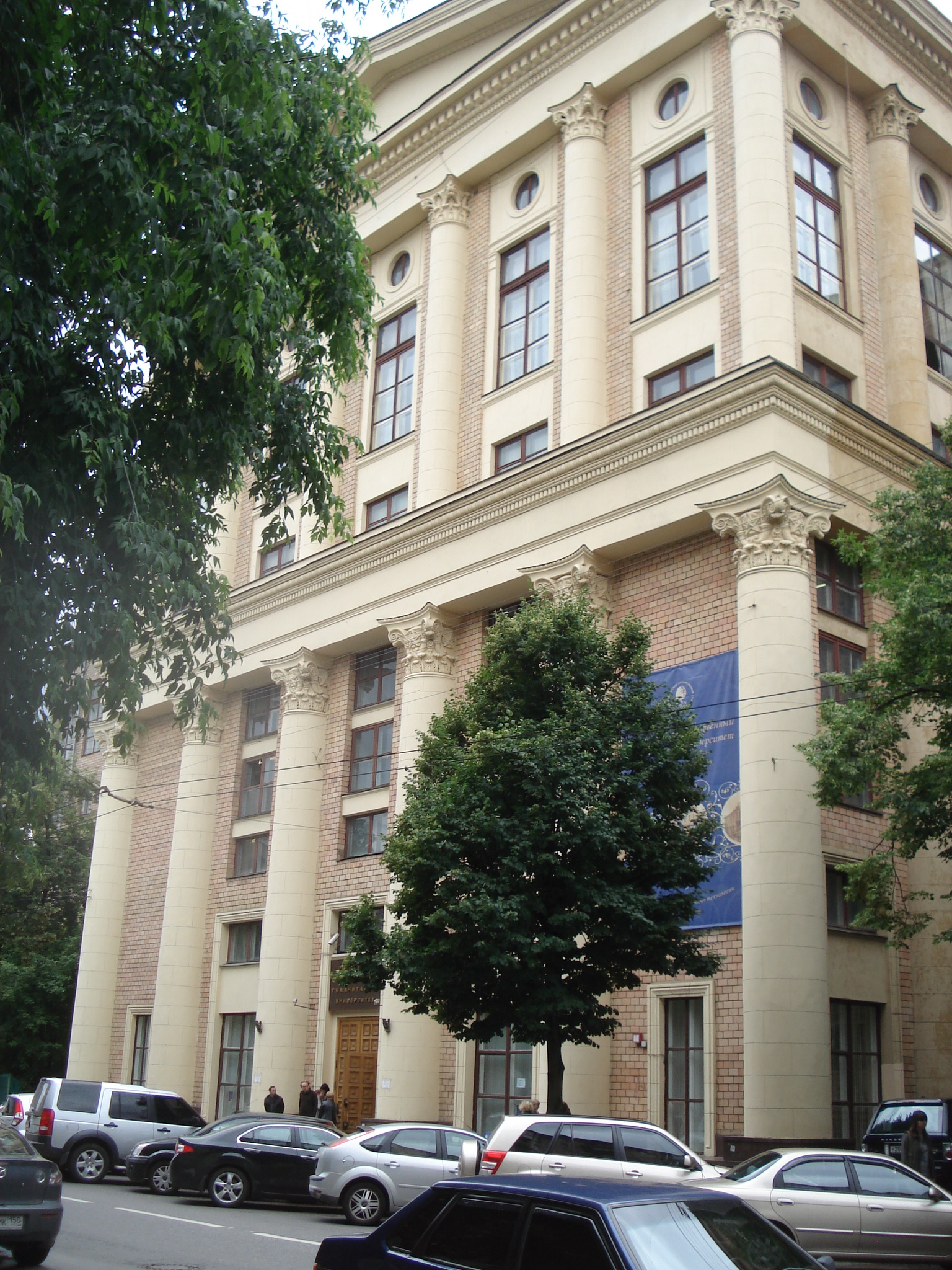
- Type: Public
- Active: 1918–1991
- Postgraduates: 150
- Location: Moscow, Russia; 55°46′38″N 37°35′42″E
- Campus: Urban

Higher Party School under the Central Committee of the CPSU (Russian: Высшая партийная школа при ЦК КПСС) was a higher party-political educational institution in the Soviet Union for the training and retraining of the leadership of the Communist Party of the Soviet Union and Soviet state, and media workers (radio, print, and television), which existed in Moscow from 1939 to 1978. It was merged with the Academy of Social Sciences under the Central Committee of the CPSU. About 10,000 party and government workers graduated from the institution, and more than 14,500 completed retraining courses.

== History ==
On July 10, 1918, on the initiative of Yakov Sverdlov, courses for agitators and propagandists were opened at the All-Russian Central Executive Committee. In January 1919, the courses were reorganized into the School of Soviet Work. On its basis, the Central School of Soviet and Party Work was created, which in July 1919 was renamed the Sverdlov Communist University. This was the first higher party educational institution in the USSR, training personnel for the party administration. The university opened its doors in the fall of 1919. At first, the university was located in a building on Malaya Dmitrovka Street, Building 6, and in the first half of the 1920s it moved to Miusskaya Square, Building 6, into the building that had been occupied by Moscow State Scientific University.

In 1936-1938 The School of Propagandists was given books and magazines from the libraries of closed educational institutions: the Institute of Red Professors, the Communist University of the Toilers of the East, the Communist University of National Minorities of the West, and a number of other libraries. In 1939, after the 18th Congress of the All-Russian Communist Party of Bolsheviks, the School of Propagandists was reorganized into the Higher Party School under the Central Committee of the All-Union Communist Party (Bolsheviks).

The predecessors of the Higher Party School under the Central Committee of the CPSU were the Sverdlov Communist University, the courses for agitators and instructors under the All-Russian Central Executive Committee, and the Sverdlov Higher School of Propagandists. In 1935, the university was transformed into the Sverdlov Higher School of Propagandists under the Central Committee of the All-Union Communist Party (Bolsheviks).

It received its last name in 1939. In 1978, the Higher Party School was merged with the Academy of Social Sciences and the Correspondence Higher Party School. The new institution was named the Academy of Social Sciences under the CPSU Central Committee and was located on Vernadsky Avenue. In the same year, the Moscow Higher Party School was separated as an independent party and scientific institution, which remained on Miusskaya Square. A large role in replenishing the library of the new institution was played by acquiring literature from the collections of related libraries - the Academy of Social Sciences under the CPSU Central Committee, the Administrative Department of the Central Committee of the CPSU, the All-Russian State Library of Foreign Literature, the Lenin State Library of the USSR, etc.

Every year, the library received about 40 thousand copies in Russian and more than 1,500 copies in 12 foreign languages. By the beginning of 1991, the school library contained about 1 million storage units and was one of the largest libraries in Moscow with a socio-political profile.

In the early 1990s, after the previous party-state system began to outlive itself, and the CPSU lost its political and legal status, there was no longer a need to train party personnel. New educational institutions began to appear on the basis of party schools.

In 1991, the Russian State Humanitarian University was opened on Miusskaya Square. Most of the book collection of the Higher Party School was transferred to the Russian State Social University and the Russian Academy of Public Administration under the President of the Russian Federation, and the remaining part of the collection became part of the emerging library of the Russian State Humanitarian University. According to rough estimates, the collection of the Information Complex "Scientific Library" of the [Russian State Humanitarian University contains more than 53 thousand books from the collections of MSU and Moscow Higher Party School, part of this book heritage is used in the educational process.

== See also ==
- Central Party School
- Central Cadres Training School of the Workers' Party of Korea
- "Karl Marx" Party Academy of the Socialist Unity Party of Germany
