= Erivan Governorate =

Governorate of the Russian Empire

Coordinates: 40.1833°N 44.5167°E

Erivan Governorate Эриванская губерния
- Governorate
- Coat of arms

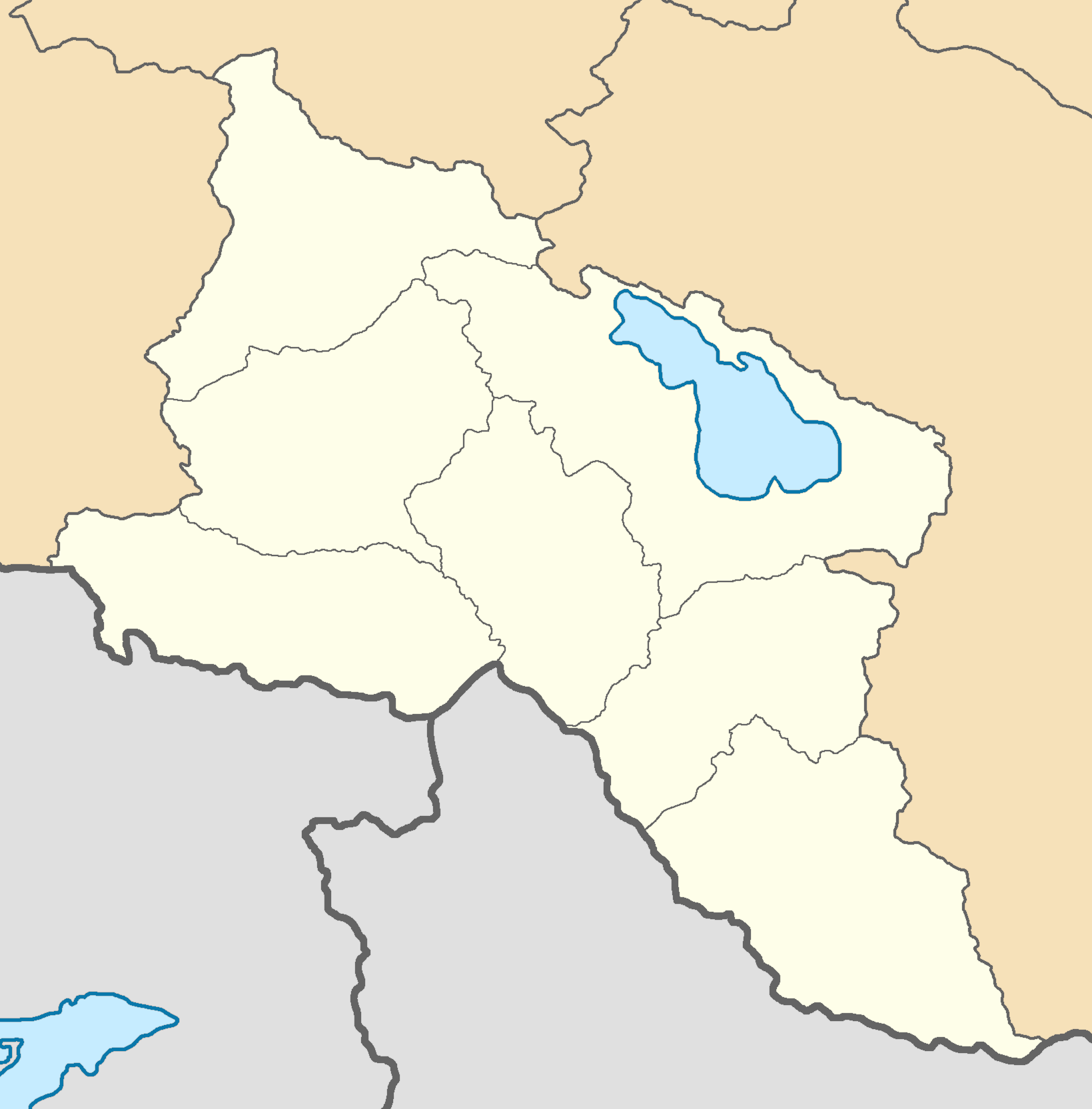
- Administrative map of the Erivan Governorate
- Country: Russian Empire
- Viceroyalty: Caucasus
- Established: 1849
- Abolished: 1917
- Capital: Erivan (present-day Yerevan)

Area
  - Total: 26,397.11 km^{2} (10,191.98 sq mi)
  - Water: 1,416.2 km^{2} (546.8 sq mi)
- Highest elevation (Mount Ararat): 5,137 m (16,854 ft)

Population (1916)
  - Total: 1,120,242
  - Density: 42.43805/km^{2} (109.9141/sq mi)
  - Urban: 11.83%
  - Rural: 88.17%

The Erivan Governorate (Note: Russian: Эриванская губерния, pre-reform orthography: Эриванская губернія, romanized: Erivanskaya guberniya [ɪrʲɪvənskəjə ɡʊbʲɪrnʲɪjə]; Armenian: Երևանի նահանգ, classical orthography: Երեւանի նահանգ, romanized: Erewani nahang [jɛɾɛˈvɑni nɑˈhɑŋɡ]; Azerbaijani: ایروان غوبیرنیاسی, romanized: İrəvan quberniyası) was a province (guberniya) of the Caucasus Viceroyalty of the Russian Empire, with its centеr in Erivan (present-day Yerevan). Its area was 27,830 sq. kilometеrs, roughly corresponding to what is now most of central Armenia, the Iğdır Province of Turkey, and the Nakhchivan exclave of Azerbaijan. At the end of the 19th century, it bordered the Tiflis Governorate to the north, the Elizavetpol Governorate to the east, the Kars Oblast to the west, and Persia and the Ottoman Empire to the south. Mount Ararat and the fertile Ararat Valley were included in the center of the province.

In 1828, the khanates of Erivan and the Nakhichevan were annexed from Persia by the Russian Empire through the Treaty of Turkmenchay. The newly annexed territories were incorporated into a single administrative unit known as the Armenian Oblast. In 1849, the oblast was reorganized into a governorate.

== History ==
By decree of Tsar Nicholas I on 10 April 1840, Transcaucasia was divided into two administrative units: The Georgia-Imeretia Governorate and the Caspian Oblast. The religious and national affiliations of the peoples of Transcaucasia were not considered during the administrative arrangements, which led to the dissatisfaction of the indigenous peoples.

In 1846, these two units were dissolved, and instead of the Georgia-Imeretia Governorate, the Tiflis Governorate and Kutaisi Governorate were formed. By a special imperial decree in 1849, the Erivan Governorate was detached and established separate from the Tiflis Governorate. The region of Meghri was temporarily annexed into the Erivan Governorate before being reallocated to the Elizavetpol Governorate.

In 1872, the Erivan Governorate consisted of 7 administrative districts: Alexandropol, Erivan, Nor Bayazet, Sharur-Daralayaz, Etchmiadzin, Nakhichevan and Surmalu. Besides Erivan, other important cities included Alexandropol (Gyumri), Nakhichevan (Nakhchivan), Novobayazet (Gavar), Ordubad, and Vagarshapat (Vagharshapat).

In 1918, the First Republic of Armenia was formed in the territory of Erivan Governorate and parts of Kars Oblast, Elizavetpol and Tiflis governorates, with Erivan (Yerevan) as its national capital. Following the Sovietization of the Caucasus, the territory of the Erivan Governorate was divided between the Armenian and Azerbaijani Soviet republics, and the Republic of Turkey.

== Development ==
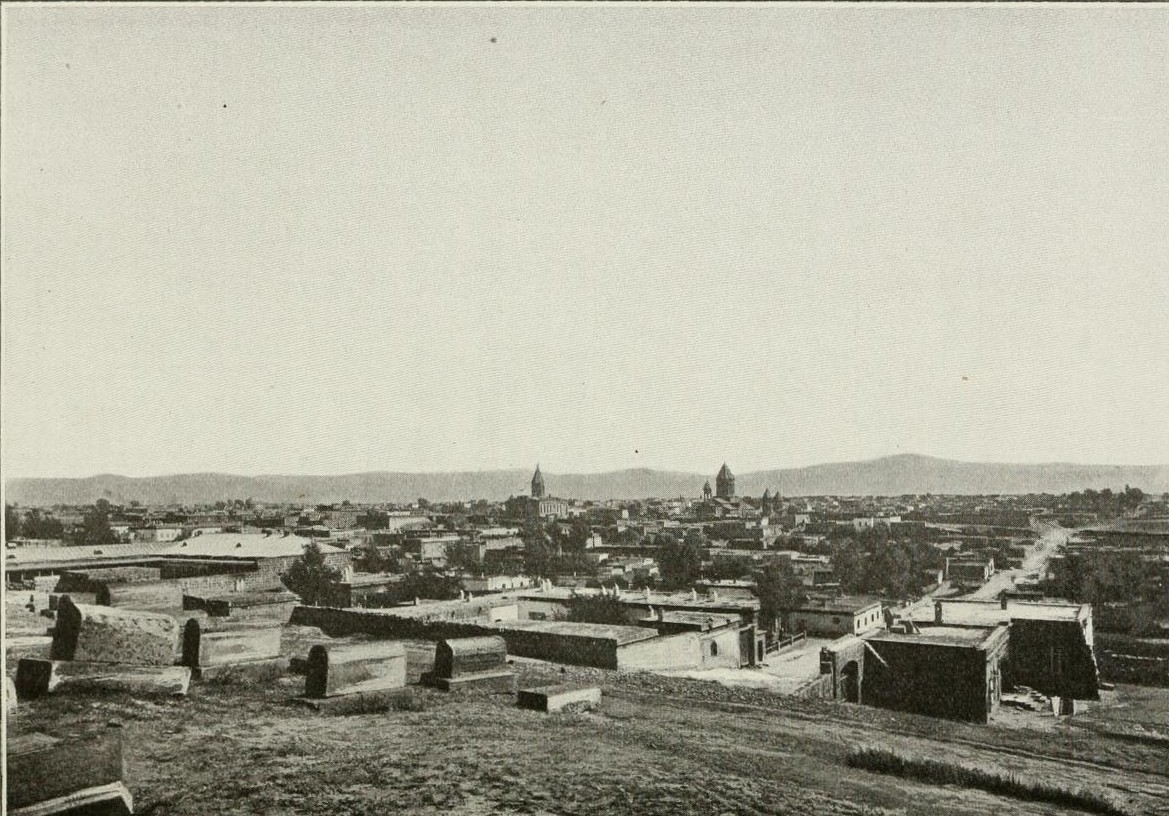
Alexandropol (Gyumri)

Between 1880 and 1890, the cities of the Erivan Governorate experienced rapid growth as they became interconnected with the neighboring provincial capitals of Tiflis (Tbilisi), Kutais (Kutaisi), Yelisavetpol (Ganja), and Baku. The Transcaucasus railway had been developed since the end of the 19th century, from Tiflis reaching Alexandropol in 1897, which shortly after became a regional railway center (Gyumri railway station). The Kars-Alexandropol-Tiflis (Kars-Gyumri-Tbilisi) railway was put into operation in 1899, and the railway from Alexandropol to Erivan in 1901. In 1906, the Erivan-Julfa railway was put into operation, thereby establishing a connection between Erivan and Iran. Highways of state significance were also improved, thus the trade between cities became increasingly active, the crafts developed again, and the first industry began in the province. Shortly after, the first hydropower plant was put into operation. A long-distance telephone and telegraph connection was later established. Later, the Transcaucasus Railway was connected to the Russian railway network, thereby connecting Erivan with Moscow, St. Petersburg, and through the seaport of Batum to the Mediterranean countries.

=== Erivan ===
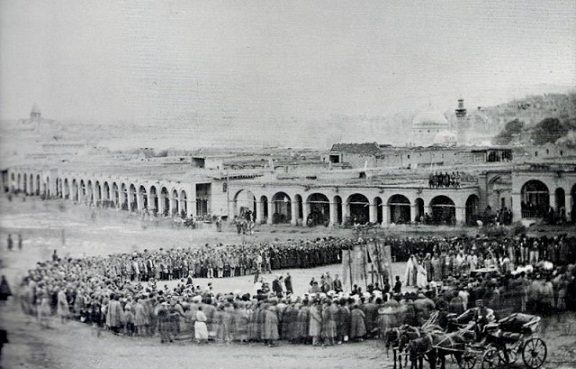
Old market of Yerevan: Ghantar

The Armenian secular elite, together with the Russian authorities, started a new phase of development in Erivan, transforming it from a Persian frontier town to a provincial capital. In 1832, the provincial school of Yerevan was opened. In the same year a library was established, which was later enriched and became the largest and famous library in Armenia (National Library of Armenia). Five years later, in 1837, a diocesan school was opened. In 1850, the girls' college was founded. In 1856, the first plan of the city was approved. In 1860, a parish school was opened in Nork. In 1863, Astafyan (Abovyan) Street was opened, and by the end of the century, there were also other parallel vertical streets, which created a more or less regular network of transport routes in the center. In 1866, the Gaianean Girls' College was opened.

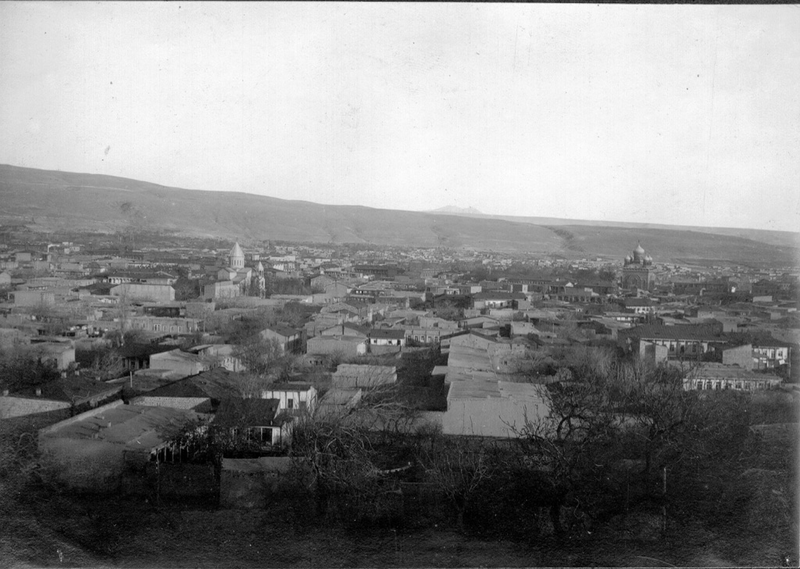
Yerevan in the beginning of 20th century

In 1879, by decree of the Tsar, the position of mayor of Erivan was established, wherein Hovhannes Ghorghanyan was appointed. Through the efforts of Ghorghanyan and the city elite, under the auspices of the Russian Empire, in 1881 the Erivan Teachers' Seminary was opened (now a Yerevan State University building). In the same year, the Yerevan Beer Factory was opened, in 1887, Tairyan Vodka, Alcohol and Wine Factory, in 1892, Mineral Water and Syrup Factory, in 1893, Afrikyan and Gyulazyan Factory, and in 1894, Sarayev Wine and Brandy factory. In 1890, Tairyan's factory was bought by the Russian manufacturer Shustov, with large investments, the production of brandy increased tenfold (see Shustov vodka). In 1907, the city was partially electrified, in 1913, it was telephoned. In 1912, drinking water was brought from Forty Springs. There was an electric tram and a horse-drawn carriage in the city. New shops and hotels were opened. In 1913, the first car entered the city. In 1913, there were 4 clinics, 3 pharmacies, an ophthalmology clinic and a psychiatric hospital.

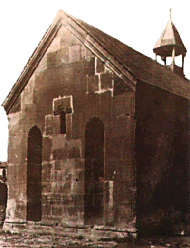
Gethsemane Chapel in Yerevan

At the end of the 19th century, Yerevan continued to be an eastern town with its narrow, crooked streets, houses built of clay and small stones, markets and baths, churches and mosques. The width of the streets did not exceed 3–4 meters. Streams flowed on both sides. The city had a number of well-known urban areas: the city center - Shahar, the market - Ghantar (Persian: Libra), Kond or Tsirani Tagh, Dzoragyugh, Nork, Shen Tagh, Boulevard, Berd, etc. Due to economic development, the city's population tripled in 30 years, reaching 35,000 in 1913. Along with the Armenian districts, there were districts inhabited by other nations, mainly Tatars. (Note: Before 1918, Azerbaijanis were generally known as "Tatars". This term, employed by the Russians, referred to Turkic-speaking Muslims of the South Caucasus. After 1918, with the establishment of the Azerbaijan Democratic Republic and "especially during the Soviet era", the Tatar group identified itself as "Azerbaijani".) The national minorities had their own schools, secular and spiritual centers. Several new Armenian churches were built, one of which was St. Gregory the Illuminator Church (now demolished). At the end of the 19th century and at the beginning of the 20th century Russian churches were built, St. Nicholai Cathedral and Church of the Intercession of the Holy Mother of God.

== Administrative divisions ==
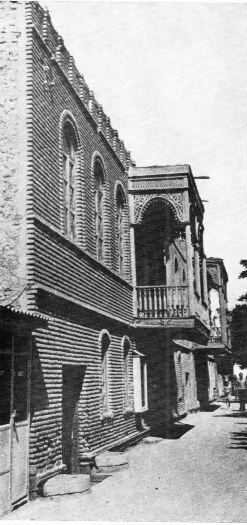
A street in Vagarshapat

Until 1872, the various districts of the Erivan Governorate were still referred to by their Persian designation mahal ("small district"). After 1872, the Russians split the Erivan Governorate into seven uezds: Erivan, Etchmiadzin, Surmalu, Nakhichevan, Alexandropol, Sharur-Daralayaz and Nor Bayazet. Nor Bayazet was the largest uezd of the governorate, whereas Sharur-Daralayaz was the smallest.

The counties (uezds) of the Erivan Governorate in 1917 were as follows:

Name	Administrative centre			Population		Area
Name		1897	1913	1897	1916	Area
Alexandropol uezd (Александропольский уезд)	Aleksandropol (Gyumri)	30,616	33,876	165,503	226,080	3,386.70 square versts (3,854.28 km^{2}; 1,488.14 mi^{2})
Nakhichevan uezd (Нахичеванский уезд)	Nakhichevan (Nakhchivan)	8,790	7,353	100,771	136,859	3,939.04 square versts (4,482.87 km^{2}; 1,730.85 mi^{2})
Nor Bayazet uezd (Новобаязетский уезд)	Novobayazet (Gavar)	8,486	9,838	122,573	188,859	4,122.76 square versts (4,691.96 km^{2}; 1,811.57 mi^{2})
Surmalu uezd (Сурмалинский уезд)	Igdyr (Iğdır)	4,680	---	89,055	104,791	3,147.09 square versts (3,581.58 km^{2}; 1,382.86 mi^{2})
Sharur-Daralayaz uezd (Шаруро-Даралагёзский уезд)	Bashnorashen (Sharur)	867	---	76,538	90,250	2,637.50 square versts (3,001.64 km^{2}; 1,158.94 mi^{2})
Erivan uezd (Эриванский уезд)	Erivan (Yerevan)	29,006	28,910	150,879	205,617	2,724.30 square versts (3,100.42 km^{2}; 1,197.08 mi^{2})
Etchmiadzin uezd (Эчміадзинский уезд)	Vagorshapat (Vagharshapat)	5,267	---	124,237	167,786	3,237.40 square versts (3,684.36 km^{2}; 1,422.54 mi^{2})

== Demographics ==
The rural reforms of 1872 and the administrative changes that followed apparently resulted in a dramatic shift. The 1886 Transcaucasian census indicated that the Erivan Governorate now had 78,672 households, totalling 670,400 inhabitants—this indicated that the province had doubled in population since the 1856 survey due to the land reform, sanitation, and medical care which had advanced under the Russian administration. Between 1870 and 1910, some 100,000 Armenians immigrated to Eastern Armenia. The Armenian migration was motivated by confiscations of property and massacres such as the Hamidian massacres.

In the year 1907, the Erivan Governorate, which had a population of 426,011 men and 382,631 women totalling 808,642 inhabitants, consisted of 1,295 villages. Generally, most of the villages were exclusive in ethnic-character, however, some villages in the Nakhichevan uezd were mixed Armenian–Tatar. On average, Armenian households had 6–7 occupants, Tatar households 6.5–7.5, and Kurdish households 9–10. The ethnic makeup of rural households was the following:

Ethnic composition of rural households in the Erivan Governorate (1907)
Ethnic group	Households	%
Armenians	60,942	56.20
Tatars	40,790	37.45
Kurds	4,668	5.10
Russians	767	0.73
Assyrians	423	0.32
Greeks	57	0.20
TOTAL	107,647	100.00

=== Russian Empire census ===
According to the Russian Empire census, the Erivan Governorate had a population of 829,556 on 28 January [O.S. 16 January] 1897, including 441,889 men and 387,667 women. The majority of the population indicated Armenian to be their mother tongue, with a significant Tatar speaking minority.

The urban population of the governorate was 92,323, the largest settlements including Alexandropol (30,616), Erivan (29,006), Nakhichevan (8,790), and Nor Bayazet (8,486). Of the preceding cities, Armenian-speakers formed majorities in all except Nakhichevan which was mainly Tatar-speaking.

Of the uezds (districts), Armenian-speakers, who were the majority of the governorate, only formed majorities in three of seven: Alexandropol, Nor Bayazet, and Etchmiadzin, whereas the rest were mainly Tatar-speaking.

Owing to the constant immigration of Ottoman Armenians to Russian Armenia, especially after the Hamidian massacres and the Armenian genocide, the proportion of Armenians in the Erivan Governorate gradually increased, as evidenced by Armenian Apostolic Church followers (predominantly ethnic Armenians) forming 52.08% of the population in 1897, and 59.55% in 1916.

Linguistic composition of the Erivan Governorate in 1897
Language	Native speakers	%
Armenian	441,000	53.16
Tatar	313,176	37.75
Kurdish	49,389	5.95
Russian	13,173	1.59
Assyrian	2,865	0.35
Ukrainian	2,682	0.32
Polish	1,385	0.17
Greek	1,323	0.16
Jewish	850	0.10
Tat	709	0.09
Georgian	566	0.07
Lithuanian	384	0.05
Italian	330	0.04
Mordovian	302	0.04
Turkish	245	0.03
Persian	235	0.03
German	210	0.03
Belarusian	82	0.01
Other	650	0.08
TOTAL	829,556	100.00

Religious composition of the Erivan Governorate in 1897
Faith	Male	Female	Both	
Faith	Male	Female	Number	%
Armenian Apostolic	223,089	208,953	432,042	52.08
Muslim	188,921	161,178	350,099	42.20
Eastern Orthodox	12,594	3,804	16,398	1.98
Armenian Catholic	4,033	3,851	7,884	0.95
Old Believer	2,312	2,515	4,827	0.58
Roman Catholic	2,103	157	2,260	0.27
Judaism	762	270	1,032	0.12
Lutheran	477	205	682	0.08
Baptist	43	30	73	0.01
Karaite	9	4	13	0.00
Anglican	6	3	9	0.00
Reformed	9	0	9	0.00
Mennonite	4	3	7	0.00
Buddhist	1	4	5	0.00
Other Christian denomination	226	173	399	0.05
Other non-Christian denomination	7,300	6,517	13,817	1.67
TOTAL	441,889	387,667	829,556	100.00

Linguistic composition of urban settlements in the Erivan Governorate in 1897
Urban settlement	Armenian		Tatar		Russian		TOTAL
Urban settlement	Number	%	Number	%	Number	%	TOTAL
Aleksandropol (Gyumri)	21,771	71.11	1,090	3.56	4,048	13.22	30,616
Erivan (Yerevan)	12,523	43.17	12,359	42.61	2,765	9.53	29,006
Nakhichevan (Nakhchivan)	2,263	25.75	6,161	70.09	216	2.46	8,790
Novobayazet (Gavar)	8,094	95.38	40	0.47	54	0.64	8,486
Vagorshapat (Vagharshapat)	4,996	94.85	71	1.35	67	1.27	5,267
Igdyr (Iğdır)	3,934	84.06	82	1.75	489	10.45	4,680
Ordubad	284	6.16	4,088	88.66	108	2.34	4,611
Bashnorashen (Sharur)	132	15.22	597	68.86	28	3.23	867
TOTAL	53,997	58.49	24,488	26.52	7,775	8.42	92,323

Linguistic composition of uezds in the Erivan Governorate in 1897

Uezd	Armenian		Tatar		Russian		TOTAL
Uezd	Number	%	Number	%	Number	%	TOTAL
Alexandropol	141,522	85.51	7,832	4.73	5,672	3.43	165,503
Erivan	58,148	38.54	77,491	51.36	3,052	2.02	150,879
Nakhichevan	34,672	34.41	64,151	63.66	858	0.85	100,771
Nor Bayazet	81,285	66.32	34,726	28.33	2,711	2.21	122,573
Etchmiadzin	77,572	62.44	35,999	28.98	94	0.08	124,237
Surmalu	27,075	30.40	41,417	46.51	725	0.81	89,055
Sharur-Daralayaz	20,726	27.08	51,560	67.37	61	0.08	76,538
TOTAL	441,000	53.16	313,176	37.75	13,173	1.59	829,556

=== Kavkazskiy kalendar ===
According to the 1917 publication of Kavkazskiy kalendar, the Erivan Governorate had a population of 1,120,242 on 14 January [O.S. 1 January] 1916, including 589,125 men and 531,117 women, 1,014,868 of whom were the permanent population, and 105,374 were temporary residents:

Nationality	Urban		Rural		TOTAL	
Nationality	Number	%	Number	%	Number	%
Armenians	100,063	75.49	569,808	57.69	669,871	59.80
Shia Muslims (Note: Primarily Tatars.)	25,035	18.89	339,600	34.38	364,635	32.55
Kurds	348	0.26	36,160	3.66	36,508	3.26
Yazidis	229	0.17	18,067	1.83	18,296	1.63
Russians	5,457	4.12	10,646	1.08	16,103	1.44
Sunni Muslims (Note: Primarily Turco-Tatars.)	9	0.01	8,938	0.90	8,947	0.80
Asiatic Christians	492	0.37	2,829	0.29	3,321	0.30
Other Europeans	294	0.22	571	0.06	865	0.08
Roma	24	0.02	669	0.07	693	0.06
Jews	327	0.25	243	0.02	570	0.05
Georgians	275	0.21	99	0.01	374	0.03
North Caucasians	6	0.00	53	0.01	59	0.01
TOTAL	132,559	100.00	987,683	100.00	1,120,242	100.00

== Governors ==
Louis Joseph Jérôme Napoléon (1864–1932), grandnephew of Napoleon I, was made governor in 1905 to help calm the governorate after the Armenian-Tatar conflicts.

List of the governors of Erivan Governorate.

- 1849 – 1859 Ivan Nazarov
- 1860 – 1862 Mikhail Astafev
- 1862 – 1863 Nikolai Kolyubakin
- 1863 – 1865 Aleksey Kharitonov
- 1869 – 1873 Nikolai Karmalin
- 1873 – 1880 Mikhail Roslavlev
- 22 March 1880 – 22 December 1890 Mikhail Shalikov
- 2 February 1891 – 16 November 1895 Alexander Frese
- 20 February 1896 – 1916 Vladimir Tiesenhausen
- 1905 Louis Joseph Jérôme Napoléon
- 1905 – 1906 Maksud Alikhanov-Avarskiy
- 1916 – 1917 Arkady Strelbitskiy
- 14 March 1917 – November 1917 V.A. Kharlamov
- November 1917 Avetis Agaryan
- 1917 – 1917 Sokrat Tyurosyan

== See also ==
- Russian Armenia
- History of Yerevan

== Bibliography ==
- Bournoutian, George A. (2018). Armenia and Imperial Decline: The Yerevan Province, 1900–1914. Milton Park, Abingdon, Oxon: Routledge. ISBN 978-1-351-06260-2. OCLC 1037283914.
- Hovannisian, Richard G. (1971). The Republic of Armenia. Vol. 1: The First Year, 1918–1919. Berkeley: University of California Press. ISBN 978-0520019843.
- Кавказский календарь на 1917 год [Caucasian calendar for 1917] (in Russian) (72nd ed.). Tiflis: Tipografiya kantselyarii Ye.I.V. na Kavkaze, kazenny dom. 1917. Archived from the original on 4 November 2021.
- Tsutsiev, Arthur (2014). Atlas of the Ethno-Political History of the Caucasus (PDF). Translated by Nora Seligman Favorov. New Haven: Yale University Press. ISBN 9780300153088. Archived (PDF) from the original on 17 June 2023.
