= Amasia District =

Coordinates: 40°56′48″N 43°46′53″E

Amasia District Ամասիայի շրջան
- District
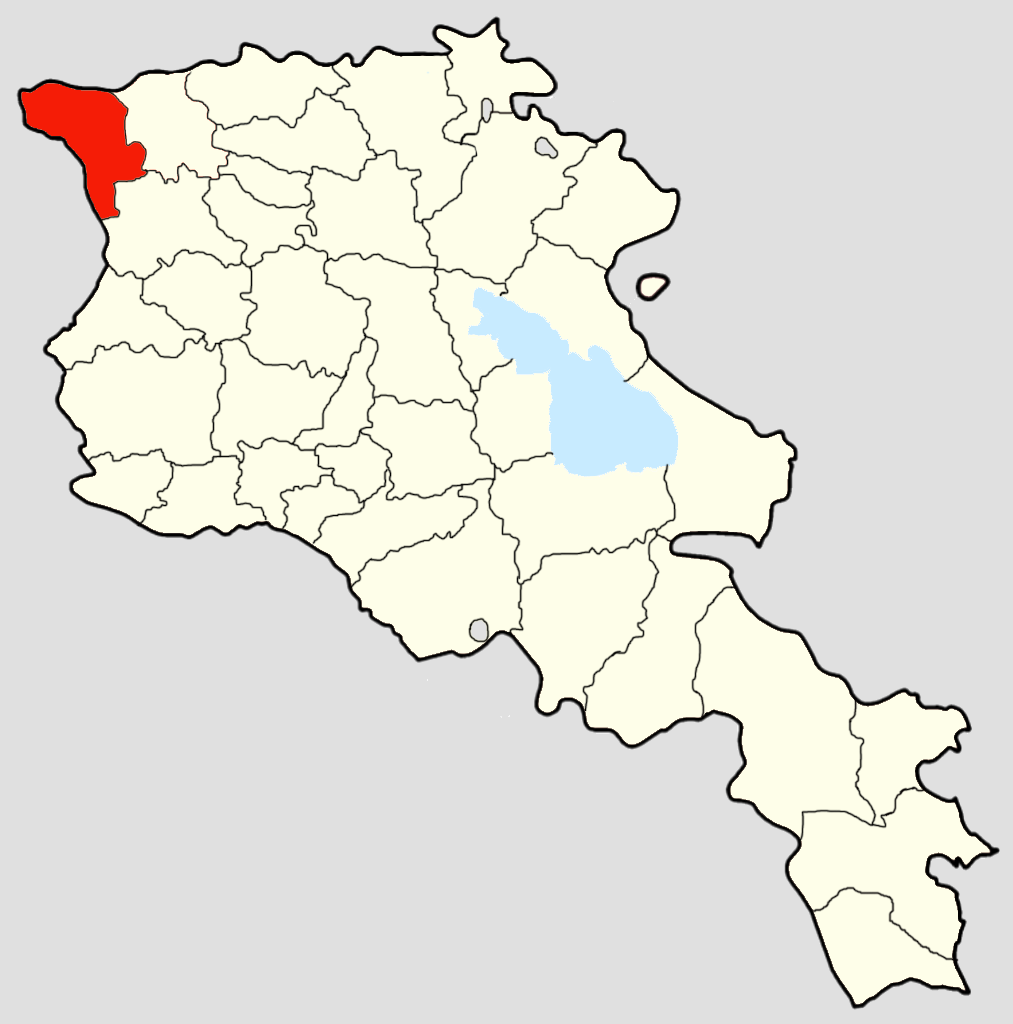
- The Amasia District in Armenia
- Country: Armenian SSR Armenia
- Established: 9 September 1930
- Abolished: 11 April 1995
- Capital: Amasia

Area
  - Total: 534 km^{2} (206 sq mi)

Population (1989)
  - Total: 6,342
  - Density: 11.9/km^{2} (30.8/sq mi)

The Amasia District (Armenian: Ամասիայի շրջան) was a raion (district) of the Armenian Soviet Socialist Republic from 1930 and later in 1991 of the Republic of Armenia until its disestablishment in 1995. The Amasia District today constitutes a northwestern part of the Shirak Province (marz) and bordered the Kars Province of the Republic of Turkey to the west and the Javakheti region of Georgia to the north. Its administrative center was the town of Amasia. Geographically, Amasia is located in a high-altitude area, bordering Turkey to the west and Georgia to the north. The broader Shirak Province, which Amasia is now part of, is characterized by the Ashotsk Plateau and Shirak Plain, surrounded by various mountain ranges.

== History ==
The human settlements in the region date back to ninth century BCE. The region was part of various empires such as Achaemenid and Byzantine Empires during the early years, and Umayyad Caliphate and Pahlavunis in the Middle Ages. It came under the control of the Russian Empire in the 19th century. The Amasia District was formed on the territory of the Armenian SSR in 1930, originally part of the Leninakan uezd (previously Alexandropol uezd). Amasia is the only territory of the former Kars Oblast retained by Armenia, when Turkey annexed the rest of it through the Treaty of Kars. The district and its capital were initially known as Aghbaba (Armenian: Աղբաբա) before being renamed Amasia in the 1930s. Shortly after the Dissolution of the Soviet Union, the Republic of Armenia consolidated the Amasia, and four districts into the larger Shirak Province.

== Geography ==
The Amasia District, is now part of Shirak Province, which is located in the northwestern part of the Republic of Armenia. It shares its western border with Turkey and its northern border with Georgia. The geographical features of the province include the Ashotsk Plateau in the northern section, with elevations ranging from 1,900 to 2,100 m (6,200 to 6,900 ft), and the Shirak Plain in the central and southern parts, situated at altitude of 1,400 to 1,800 m (4,600 to 5,900 ft). These plains are bordered by various mountain ranges, including the Bazum and Pambak mountains to the east, and the Javakheti Range and Yeghnakhagh mountains to the north. The Akhurian River and its reservoir are significant hydrological features, also forming a portion of the border with Turkey.

The topography of the Amasia District, located within the Shirak Province of Armenia, is diverse and largely mountainous. The region's climate is continental and considered the coldest in Armenia. It experiences harsh, snowy winters from December to March where maximum temperatures reach only 11 °C (52 °F). The economy relies on the province's natural resources, with significant mines located in areas like Artik, Anipemza, Pemzashen, and Gyumri.

== See also ==
- Districts of the Armenian Soviet Socialist Republic
