= Supreme Council of Armenia =

Supreme Soviet of the Armenian SSR Supreme Council of the Republic of Armenia Հայկական ՍՍՀ Գերագույն սովետ Հայաստանի Հանրապետության Գերագույն խորհուրդ (Armenian) Верховный Совет Армянской ССР Верховный Совет Республики Армения (Russian)
- Armenian SSR (1938–1990); Armenia (1990–1995)
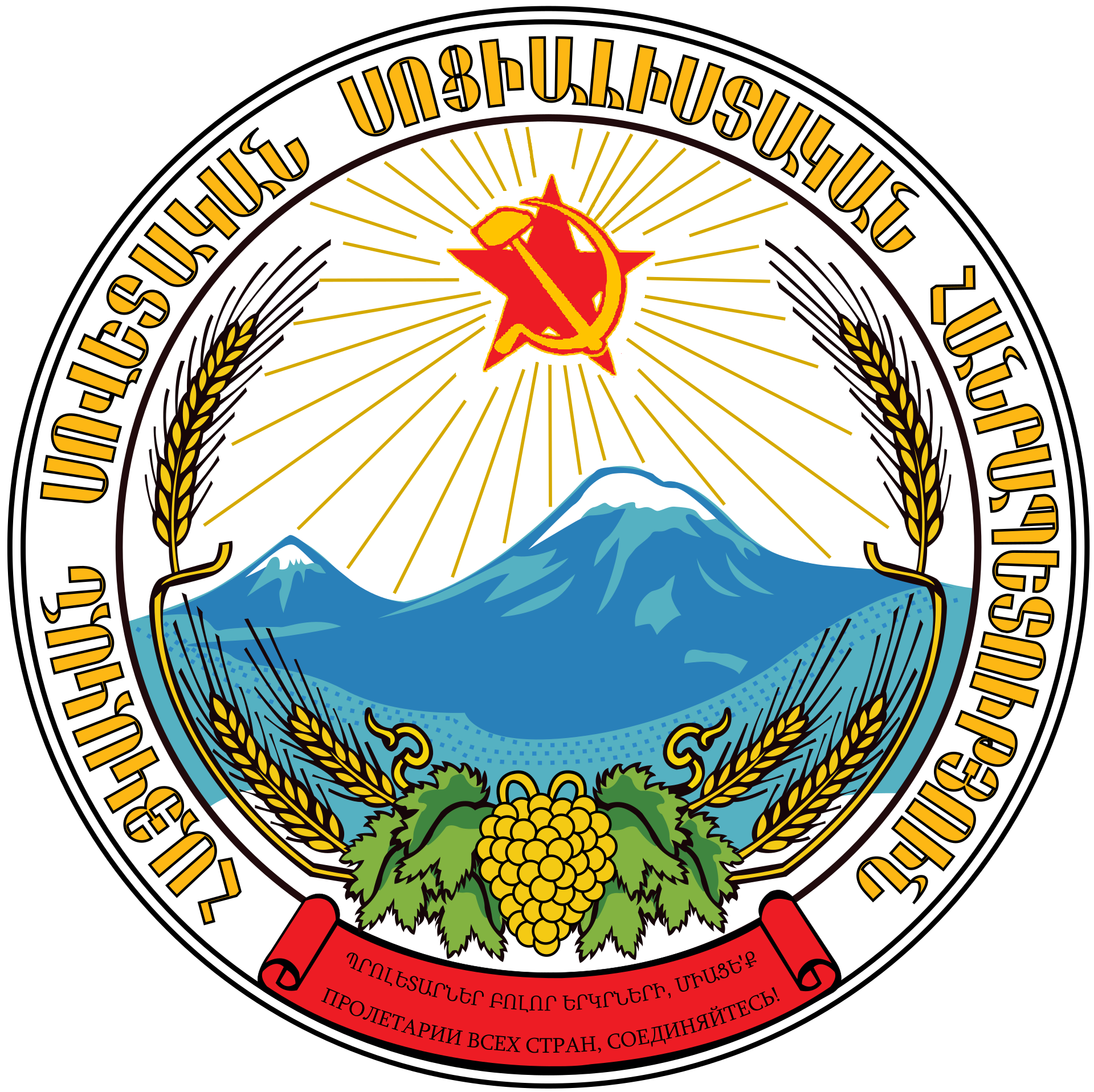
- Coat of arms before (left) and after (right) the dissolution of the Soviet Union

Type
- Type: Unicameral (Supreme Council)

History
- Established: 1938
- Disbanded: 1995
- Preceded by: Armenian National Council
- Succeeded by: National Assembly

Leadership
- Chairman: Babken Ararktsyan (1991–1995)

Elections
- Last election: 1990

The Supreme Soviet of the Armenian SSR, (Note: Armenian: Հայկական ՍՍՀ Գերագույն սովետ, romanized: Haykakan SSH Geraguyn sovet Russian: Верховный Совет Армянской ССР, romanized: Verkhovnyy Sovet Armyanskoy SSR) (Note: Sometimes translated as Supreme Council of the Armenian SSR) later renamed as the Supreme Council of the Republic of Armenia, (Note: Armenian: Հայաստանի Հանրապետության Գերագույն խորհուրդ, romanized: Hayastani Hanrapetut’yan Geraguyn khorhurd Russian: Верховный Совет Республики Армения, romanized: Verkhovnyy Sovet Respubliki Armeniya) was the Supreme Council of the Armenian Soviet Socialist Republic and later the independent Republic of Armenia. It was superseded by the National Assembly in 1995 when Armenia adopted the Armenian Constitution.

The Supreme Council was preceded by the Armenian National Council (1917–1918) and then a Khorhurd (legislature), before Armenia became part of the Soviet Union in 1920.

== Convocations ==
- 1st convocation (1938–1946)
- 2nd convocation (1947–1950)
- 3rd convocation (1951–1954)
- 4th convocation (1955–1959)
- 5th convocation (1959–1962)
- 6th convocation (1963–1966)
- 7th convocation (1967–1970)
- 8th convocation (1971–1974)
- 9th convocation (1975–1979)
- 10th convocation (1980–1984)
- 11th convocation (1985–1989)
- 12th convocation (1990–1995)

== Chairperson of the Presidium of the Supreme Soviet of the Armenian SSR ==
- Matsak Papyan (hy) (1938–1954)
- Shmavon Arushanyan (hy) (1954–1963)
- Nagush Arutyunyan (hy) (1963–1975)
- Babken Sarkisov (hy) (1975–1985)
- Grant Voskanyan (hy) (1985–1990)

== Notable members ==
Members included:

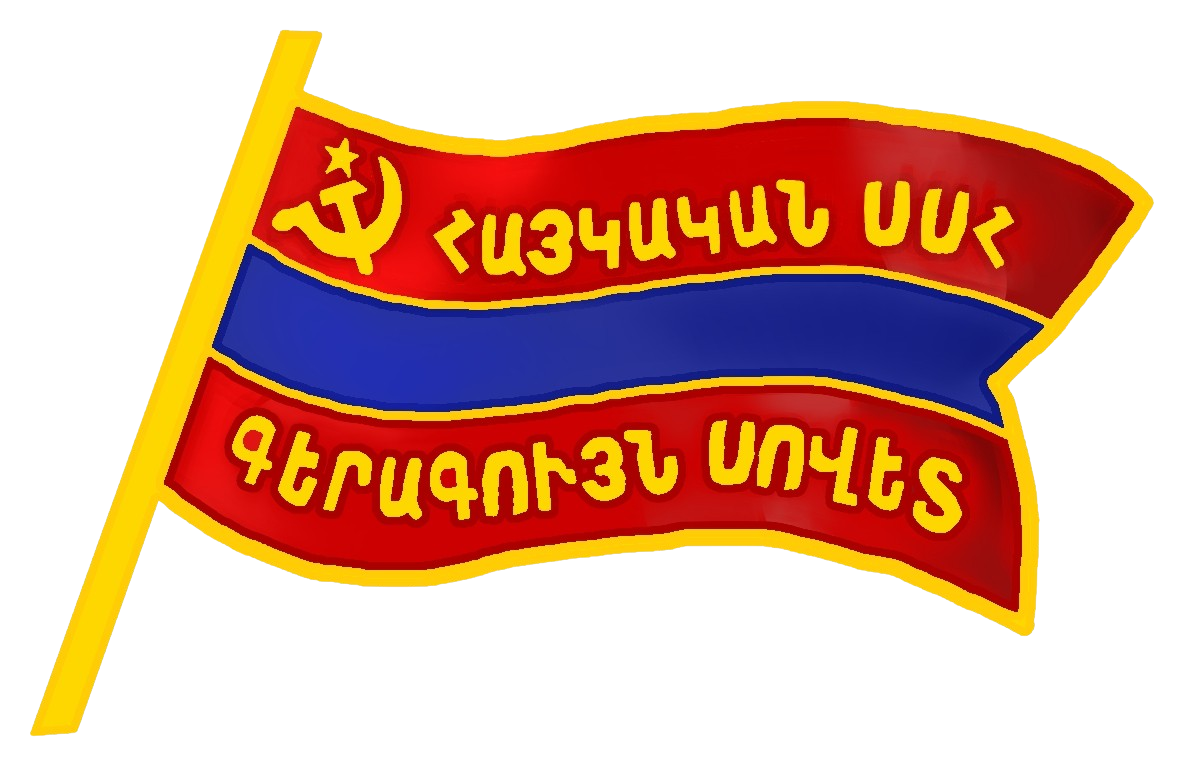
Armenian SSR Supreme Soviet Pin

- Levon Ter-Petrosyan, President of the Supreme Council of the Republic of Armenia at the time of nation's independence in 1990
- Serzh Sargsyan
- Karapet Rubinyan
- Ara Sahakian, secretary in 1990 when he signed the Declaration of Independence of Armenia with president Ter-Petrosyan
- Samand Siabandov
