= Tiflis uezd =

Coordinates: 41°43′21″N 44°47′33″E

Tiflis uezd Тифлисскій уѣздъ
- Uezd
- Coat of arms

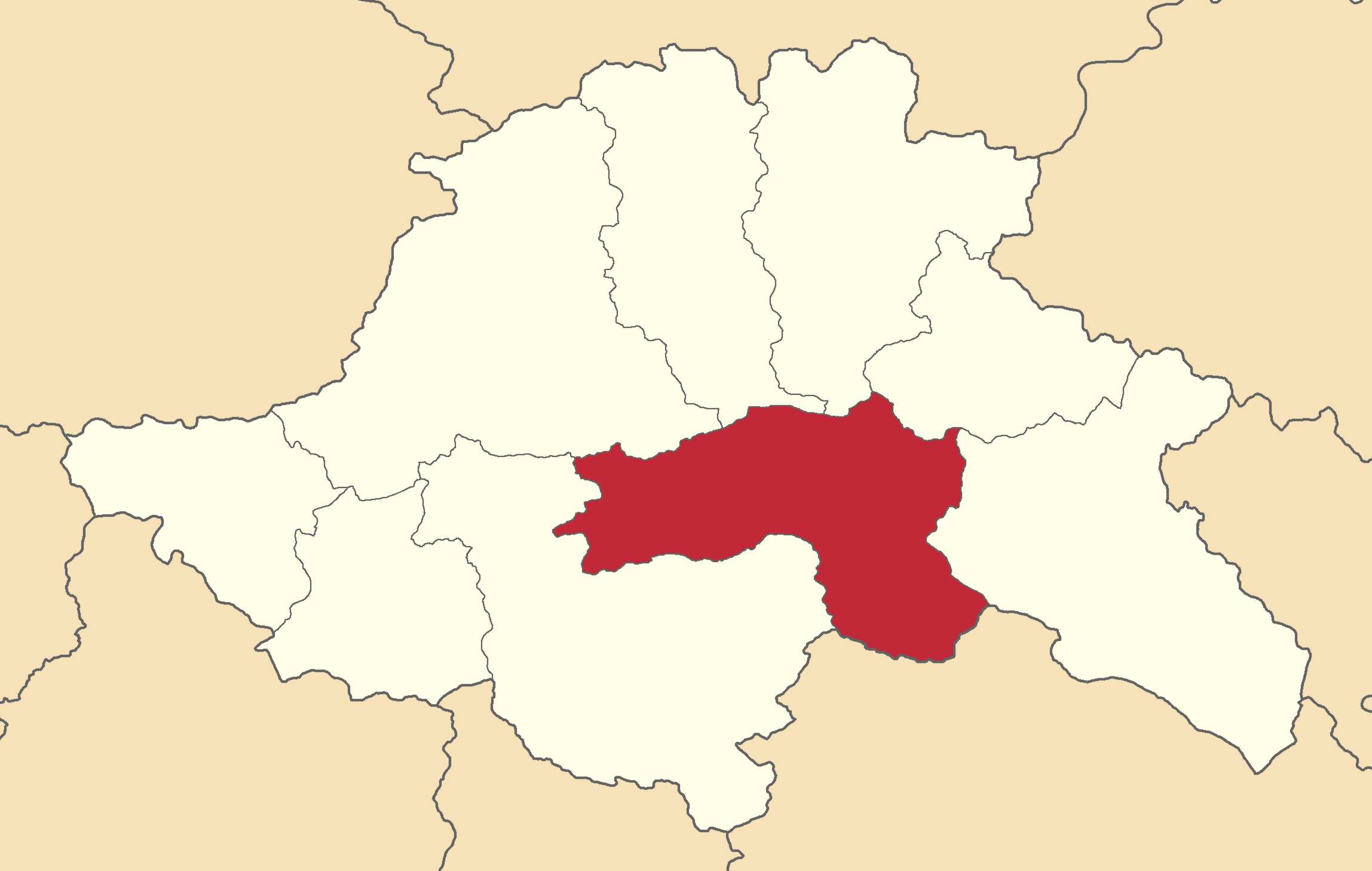
- Location in the Tiflis Governorate
- Country: Russian Empire
- Viceroyalty: Caucasus
- Governorate: Tiflis
- Established: 1804
- Abolished: 1930
- Capital: Tiflis (present-day Tbilisi)

Area
  - Total: 4,556.89 km^{2} (1,759.43 sq mi)

Population (1916)
  - Total: 521,222
  - Density: 114.381/km^{2} (296.246/sq mi)
  - Urban: 66.53%
  - Rural: 33.47%

The Tiflis uezd (Note: Russian: Тифлисскій уѣ́здъ, romanized: Tiflíssky uyézd; Georgian: ტფილისის მაზრა, romanized: t'pilisis mazra; Armenian: Թիֆլիսի գավառ, romanized: Tʼiflisi gavaṙ) was a county (uezd) of the Tiflis Governorate of the Caucasus Viceroyalty of the Russian Empire, and then of Democratic Republic of Georgia, with its administrative centre in Tiflis (present-day Tbilisi). The area of the uezd roughly corresponded to the contemporary Kvemo Kartli region of Georgia. The district bordered the Telavi uezd to the northeast, the Tionety and Dusheti uezds to the north, the Gori uezd to the northwest, the Borchaly uezd to the west, the Kazakh uezd of the Elizavetpol Governorate to the south, and the Signakh uezd to the east.

== History ==
The Tiflis uezd as part of the Georgia Governorate was formed in 1801 as a result of the annexation of the Kingdom of Kartli-Kakhetian to the Russian Empire. In 1840, the district formed a part of the Georgia-Imeretia Governorate, then after 1846 it was included in the Tiflis Governorate until its abolition by Soviet authorities. In 1880, the Borchaly uezd was detached from the Tiflis uezd to be administered separately.

Following the Russian Revolution, the Tiflis uezd was incorporated into the short-lived Democratic Republic of Georgia.

== Administrative divisions ==
The subcounties (uchastoks) of the Tiflis uezd in 1913 were as follows:

Name	1912 population	Area
Karayazskiy uchastok (Караязскій участокъ)	7,724	1,426.51 square versts (1,623.46 km^{2}; 626.82 mi^{2})
Sartachalskiy uchastok (Сартачальскій участокъ)	31,905	1,073.92 square versts (1,222.19 km^{2}; 471.89 mi^{2})
Tiflisskiy uchastok (Тифлисскій участокъ)	33,313	1,503.65 square versts (1,711.25 km^{2}; 660.72 mi^{2})
Prigorodny raion (Пригородный раіонъ)	12,168	–

== Demographics ==
=== 1897 Russian census ===
According to the 1897 Russian Empire census, the Tiflis uezd had a population of 234,632 on 28 January [O.S. 15 January] 1897, including 137,849 men and 96,783 women. The plurality of the population indicated Georgian to be their mother tongue, with significant Armenian, Russian, and Tatar (Note: Before 1918, Azerbaijanis were generally known as "Tatars". This term, employed by the Russians, referred to Turkic-speaking Muslims of the South Caucasus. After 1918, with the establishment of the Azerbaijan Democratic Republic and "especially during the Soviet era", the Tatar group identified itself as "Azerbaijani".) speaking minorities.

Linguistic composition of the Tiflis uezd in 1897
Language	Native speakers	%
Georgian	80,293	34.22
Armenian	57,933	24.69
Russian	51,775	22.07
Tatar	13,764	5.87
German	5,417	2.31
Polish	4,918	2.10
Greek	4,554	1.94
Ukrainian	3,450	1.47
Jewish	3,336	1.42
Persian	1,766	0.75
Ossetian	1,712	0.73
Assyrian	1,354	0.58
Imeretian	1,005	0.43
Lithuanian	828	0.35
French	342	0.15
Kurdish	220	0.09
Czech	191	0.08
Mingrelian	191	0.08
Romanian	175	0.07
Italian	150	0.06
Belarusian	148	0.06
Chuvash	141	0.06
Avar-Andean	124	0.05
Latvian	96	0.04
Turkish	71	0.03
Dargin	59	0.03
Chechen	52	0.02
Kazi-Kumukh	47	0.02
Kyurin	43	0.02
Kist	9	0.00
Other	468	0.20
TOTAL	234,632	100.00

=== Kavkazskiy kalendar ===
According to the 1917 publication of Kavkazskiy kalendar, the Tiflis uezd had a population of 521,222 on 14 January [O.S. 1 January] 1916, including 283,326 men and 236,896 women, 339,668 of whom were the permanent population, and 181,554 were temporary residents:

Nationality	Urban		Rural		TOTAL	
Nationality	Number	%	Number	%	Number	%
Armenians	149,294	43.05	26,044	14.93	175,338	33.64
Georgians	37,584	10.84	96,040	55.05	133,624	25.64
Russians	91,997	26.53	29,042	16.65	121,039	23.22
Other Europeans	11,883	3.43	9,075	5.20	20,958	4.02
Asiatic Christians	19,560	5.64	35	0.02	19,595	3.76
Shia Muslims (Note: Primarily Tatars.)	9,408	2.71	8,186	4.69	17,594	3.38
Jews	10,712	3.09	306	0.18	11,018	2.11
Sunni Muslims (Note: Primarily Turco-Tatars.)	6,273	1.81	3,842	2.20	10,115	1.94
Yazidis	4,697	1.35	0	0.00	4,697	0.90
North Caucasians	2,685	0.77	938	0.54	3,623	0.70
Kurds	2,279	0.66	948	0.54	3,227	0.62
Roma	394	0.11	0	0.00	394	0.08
TOTAL	346,766	100.00	174,456	100.00	521,222	100.00

== See also ==
- History of the administrative division of Russia

== Bibliography ==
- Bournoutian, George A. (2018). Armenia and Imperial Decline: The Yerevan Province, 1900–1914. Milton Park, Abingdon, Oxon: Routledge. ISBN 978-1-351-06260-2. OCLC 1037283914.
- Hovannisian, Richard G. (1971). The Republic of Armenia. Vol. 1: The First Year, 1918–1919. Berkeley: University of California Press. ISBN 978-0520019843.
- Кавказский календарь на 1913 год [Caucasian calendar for 1913] (in Russian) (68th ed.). Tiflis: Tipografiya kantselyarii Ye.I.V. na Kavkaze, kazenny dom. 1913. Archived from the original on 19 April 2022.
- Кавказский календарь на 1917 год [Caucasian calendar for 1917] (in Russian) (72nd ed.). Tiflis: Tipografiya kantselyarii Ye.I.V. na Kavkaze, kazenny dom. 1917. Archived from the original on 4 November 2021.
- Tsutsiev, Arthur (2014). Atlas of the Ethno-Political History of the Caucasus (PDF). Translated by Nora Seligman Favorov. New Haven: Yale University Press. ISBN 9780300153088. Archived (PDF) from the original on 17 June 2023.
