= Akhalkalaki uezd =

Coordinates: 41°24′20″N 43°29′10″E

Akhalkalaki uezd Ахалкалакский уезд
- Uezd
- Coat of arms

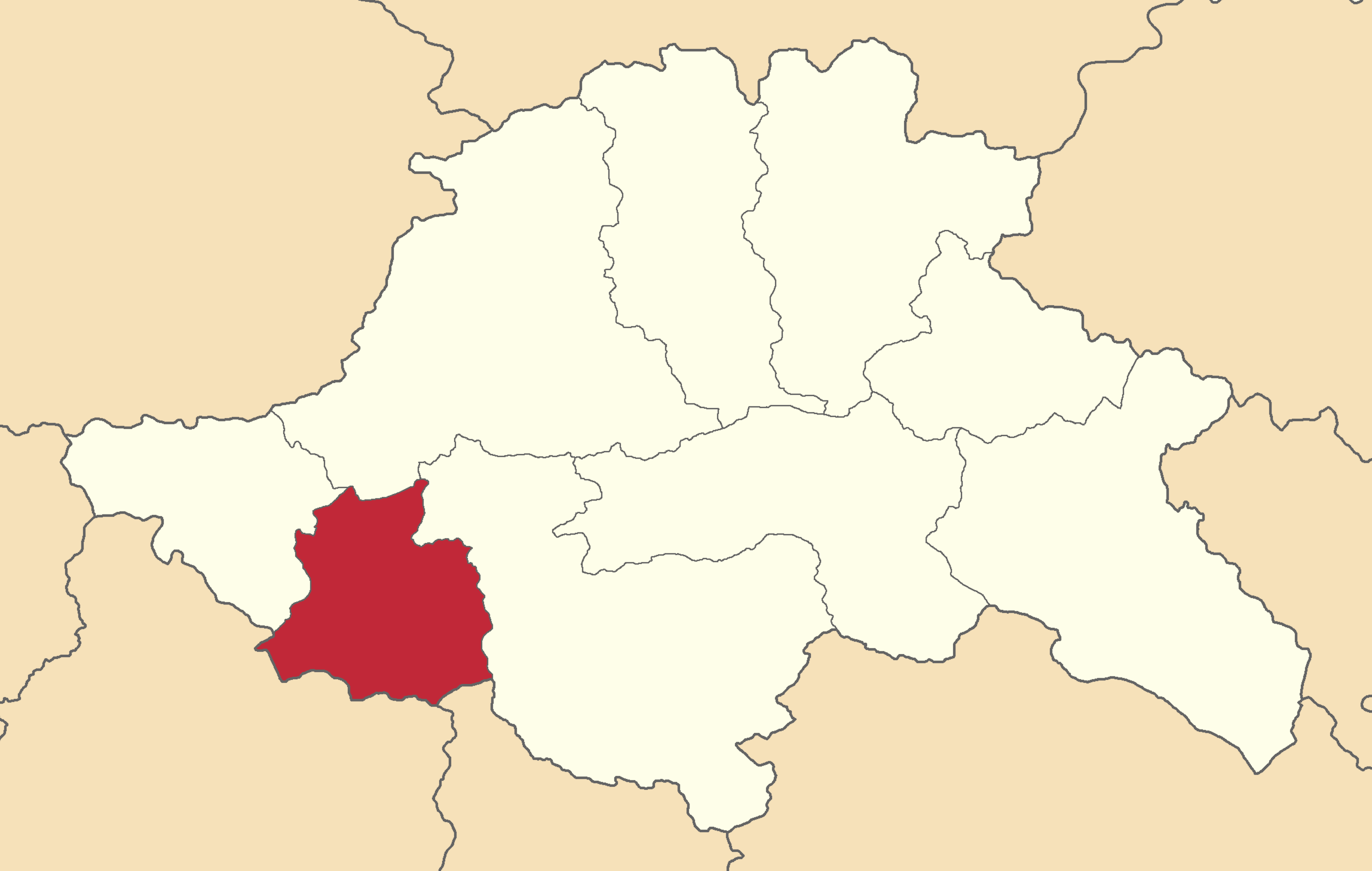
- Location in the Tiflis Governorate
- Country: Russian Empire
- Viceroyalty: Caucasus
- Governorate: Tiflis
- Established: 1874
- Abolished: 1930
- Capital: Akhalkalak (present-day Akhalkalaki)

Area
  - Total: 2,739.32 km^{2} (1,057.66 sq mi)

Population (1916)
  - Total: 107,173
  - Density: 39.1239/km^{2} (101.331/sq mi)
  - Urban: 6.58%
  - Rural: 93.42%

The Akhalkalaki uezd (Note: Russian: Ахалкалакский уезд, pre-reform orthography: Ахалкалакскій уѣздъ, romanized: Akhalkalakskiy uyezd [ɐxəɫkəɫəkskʲɪj ʊ(j)ɪst]; Georgian: ახალციხის მაზრა, romanized: akhaltsikhis mazra [aχalt͡sʰiχis mazɾa]; Armenian: Ախալքալաքի գավառ, classical orthography: Ախալքալաքի գաւառ, romanized: Axalk'alak'i gawaṙ [ɑχɑlkʰɑlɑˈkʰi ɡɑˈvɑr] (Note: Western Armenian pronunciation: [ɑχɑlkʰɑlɑˈkʰi kʰɑˈvɑr])) was a county (uezd) of the Tiflis Governorate of the Caucasus Viceroyalty of the Russian Empire, and then of Democratic Republic of Georgia, with its administrative centre in Akhalkalak (present-day Akhalkalaki). The county bordered the Gori uezd to the north, the Borchaly uezd to the east, the Alexandropol uezd of the Erivan Governorate and the Kars and Ardahan okrugs of the Kars Oblast to the south, and the Akhaltsikhe uezd to the west. The area of the county corresponded to part of the contemporary Samtskhe–Javakheti region of Georgia.

== History ==
The territory of the Akhalkalaki uezd, then part of the Akhaltsikhe uezd, entered into the Kutais Governorate of the Russian Empire following the Russo-Turkish War of 1828. By 1874, the Akhkalaki uezd was detached from the hitherto larger Akhaltsikhe uezd, becoming a constituent county of the Tiflis Governorate.

Following the Russian Revolution, the Akhalkalaki uezd was incorporated into the short-lived Democratic Republic of Georgia, however, it was strongly disputed by the Democratic Republic of Armenia which also claimed the county on the grounds of history and ethnography.

As a result of the Ottoman occupation of the uezd, of the initial 80,000 Armenians in 1918, 30,000 died whilst the surviving 40,000 still in the district were affected by famine and concubinage.

Lord Curzon during the Paris Peace Conference discussions on the fate of the independent Transcaucasian republics assessed the ethnographic situation in the southwestern uezds of the Tiflis Governorate:

On the grounds of nationality, therefore, these districts ought to belong to Armenia, but they command the heart of Georgia strategically, and on the whole it would seem equitable to assign them to Georgia, and give their Armenian inhabitants the option of emigration into the wide territories assigned to the Armenians towards the south-west.

== Administrative divisions ==
The subcounties (uchastoks) of the Akhalkalaki uezd in 1913 were as follows:

Name	1912 population	Area
Baraletskiy uchastok (Баралетский участок)	51,061	895 square versts (1,019 km^{2}; 393 mi^{2})
Bogdanovskiy uchastok (Богдановский участок)	41,331	1,512 square versts (1,721 km^{2}; 664 mi^{2})

== Demographics ==
=== 1897 Russian census ===
According to the 1897 Russian Empire census, the Akhalkalaki uezd had a population of 72,709 on 28 January [O.S. 15 January] 1897, including 37,903 men and 34,806 women. The majority of the population indicated Armenian to be their mother tongue, with significant Tatar, (Note: Before 1918, Azerbaijanis were generally known as "Tatars". This term, employed by the Russians, referred to Turkic-speaking Muslims of the South Caucasus. After 1918, with the establishment of the Azerbaijan Democratic Republic and "especially during the Soviet era", the Tatar group identified itself as "Azerbaijani".) Georgian, and Russian speaking minorities.

Linguistic composition of the Akhalkalaki uezd in 1897
Language	Native speakers	%
Armenian	52,539	72.26
Tatar	6,572	9.04
Georgian	6,448	8.87
Russian	5,155	7.09
Kurdish	810	1.11
Turkish	296	0.41
Ukrainian	286	0.39
Jewish	211	0.29
Polish	145	0.20
Lithuanian	87	0.12
Greek	75	0.10
German	40	0.06
Belarusian	12	0.02
Avar-Andean	6	0.01
Ossetian	4	0.01
Chechen	3	0.00
Mingrelian	3	0.00
Persian	3	0.00
Romanian	3	0.00
Other	11	0.02
TOTAL	72,709	100.00

=== Kavkazskiy kalendar ===
According to the 1917 publication of Kavkazskiy kalendar, the Akhalkalaki uezd had a population of 107,173 on 14 January [O.S. 1 January] 1916, including 56,140 men and 51,033 women, 106,307 of whom were the permanent population, and 866 were temporary residents:

Nationality	Urban		Rural		TOTAL	
Nationality	Number	%	Number	%	Number	%
Armenians	6,151	87.19	76,624	76.53	82,775	77.23
Georgians	265	3.76	10,039	10.03	10,304	9.61
Russians	429	6.08	7,113	7.10	7,542	7.04
Sunni Muslims (Note: Primarily Turco-Tatars.)	0	0.00	5,431	5.42	5,431	5.07
Kurds	0	0.00	904	0.90	904	0.84
Jews	204	2.89	0	0.00	204	0.19
Other Europeans	6	0.09	7	0.01	13	0.01
TOTAL	7,055	100.00	100,118	100.00	107,173	100.00

== See also ==
- History of the administrative division of Russia

== Bibliography ==
- Bournoutian, George A. (2018). Armenia and Imperial Decline: The Yerevan Province, 1900–1914. Milton Park, Abingdon, Oxon: Routledge. ISBN 978-1-351-06260-2. OCLC 1037283914.
- Hovannisian, Richard G. (1971). The Republic of Armenia. Vol. 1: The First Year, 1918–1919. Berkeley: University of California Press. ISBN 978-0520019843.
- Кавказский календарь на 1913 год [Caucasian calendar for 1913] (in Russian) (68th ed.). Tiflis: Tipografiya kantselyarii Ye.I.V. na Kavkaze, kazenny dom. 1913. Archived from the original on 19 April 2022.
- Кавказский календарь на 1917 год [Caucasian calendar for 1917] (in Russian) (72nd ed.). Tiflis: Tipografiya kantselyarii Ye.I.V. na Kavkaze, kazenny dom. 1917. Archived from the original on 4 November 2021.
- Tsutsiev, Arthur (2014). Atlas of the Ethno-Political History of the Caucasus (PDF). Translated by Nora Seligman Favorov. New Haven: Yale University Press. ISBN 9780300153088. Archived (PDF) from the original on 17 June 2023.
