= Anatoly Gekker =

Soviet military commander

Anatoly Ilyich Gekker
- Анатолий Ильич Геккер
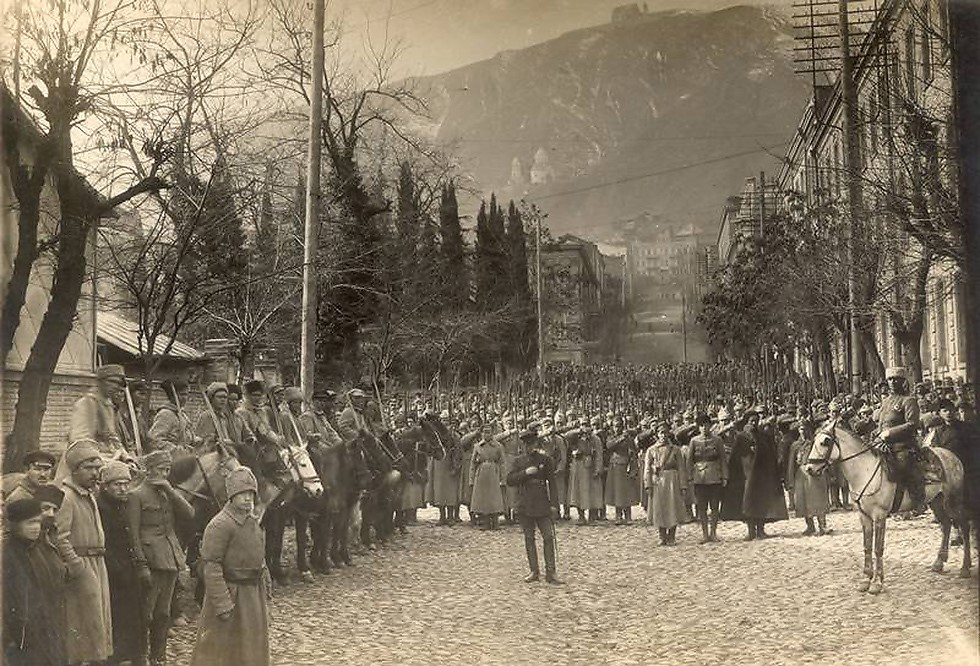
- Gekker, center
- Born: September 6, 1888; Tiflis, Russian Empire (now Tbilisi, Georgia)
- Died: July 1, 1937 (aged 48); Moscow, Soviet Union
- Military career
- Allegiance: Soviet Union
- Branch: Infantry
- Rank: Komkor (Corps Commander)
- Commands: Foreign Relations Department of the Intelligence Directorate of the Red Army
- Conflicts: World War I Russian Civil War
- Awards: Russian Imperial Army: (Russian Empire) Order of Saint Stanislaus, 3rd Class (with swords and bow); (Russian Empire) Order of St. Anna, 4th Class (with "For Bravery" inscription); (Russian Empire) Order of St. Anna, 3rd Class (with swords and bow); Soviet Union: (Soviet Union) Order of the Red Banner; (Azerbaijan Soviet Socialist Republic) Order of the Red Banner (Azerbaijan SSR) (1921); (Armenian Soviet Socialist Republic) Order of the Red Banner (Armenian SSR)

Anatoly Ilyich Gekker (Russian: Анато́лий Ильи́ч Ге́ккер; 6 September [O.S. 25 August] 1888 – 1 July 1937) was a Soviet military commander (Komkor) involved in the Russian Civil War.

Gekker was born into a family of a military doctor in Tiflis (Tbilisi), in the Georgia Governorate of the Russian Empire. He was of German ethnicity. Having graduated from Vladimir Military School in St Petersburg (1909), he briefly attended the General Staff Academy in 1917. He served as an officer in the Imperial Russian Army during World War I.

In September 1917, he joined the Bolshevik Party. He joined the Red Army in 1918. He held commanding posts on various fronts of the Russian Civil War. From April 1919 until February 1920 he commanded the 13th Red Army. From March to August 1920, he served as a Chief of Staff of Interior Forces of the Russian SFSR. From September 1920 to May 1921, he commanded the 11th Soviet Red Army which established Bolshevik rule in Azerbaijan, Armenia and Georgia.

As early as 1922, he was military adviser to the Bolshevik government in Mongolia, and in 1924 he was made political commissar on the Chinese Eastern Railway, then a Soviet military attaché to China. He was made a Soviet military attaché to Turkey in 1929. In 1933, he was transferred to the General Staff of the Red Army and promoted to Comcor in 1935.

He was executed during the Great Purge in 1937 and rehabilitated (posthumously exonerated) in 1956.
