= Mid-South =

Mid-South may refer to:

== Places ==
- Mid-South (region), a region of the United States including portions of Tennessee, Mississippi, Arkansas, Missouri, and Kentucky
- East South Central States, a region of the United States
- Memphis metropolitan area, Tennessee, United States
- Mid-South District (LCMS) in the Lutheran Church–Missouri Synod
- Mid-South District of the Unitarian Universalist Association

== Facilities and structures ==
- Mid-South Bible College, now Victory University, a Christian liberal-arts college in Memphis Tennessee
- Mid-South Coliseum, a multi-purpose arena in Memphis, Tennessee
- Mid-South Community College, a public community college in West Memphis, Arkansas

== Groups, companies, organizations ==
- Mid-South Conference, an American college athletics conference
- Mid South Conference (MHSAA), an American high school athletics conference in Michigan
- Mid-South Management Company, an American newspaper company
- Mid-South Pride, an LGBT non-profit association in Memphis, Tennessee
- MidSouth Rail Corporation, now part of the Kansas City Southern Railway
- Mid-South Wrestling, an American former professional wrestling promotion
- Midsouth FC, former name of Belizean football club Nizhee Corozal

== Other uses ==
- Mid-South Fair, a fair formerly held in Memphis, Tennessee

== See also ==
- South (disambiguation)
- MID (disambiguation)
