= Georgian-Imeretian Governorate =

Governorate of the Russian Empire

Georgian-Imeretian Governorate Грузино-Имеретинская губерния
- Governorate
- Coat of arms
- Country: Russian Empire
- Established: 1840
- Abolished: 1846
- Capital: Tiflis (present-day Tbilisi)
- Highest elevation: 5,034 m (16,516 ft)

Population (1843)
  - Total: 979,021

Georgian-Imeretian Governorate (Russian: Грузино-Имеретинская губерния, Georgian: საქართველო-იმერეთის გუბერნია) was a short-lived governorate (guberniya) of the Caucasus Viceroyalty of the Russian Empire, administered from Tiflis (Tbilisi). Roughly corresponding to modern Georgia and parts of Armenia and Azerbaijan, it was created in 1840 from the territory of the Georgia Governorate and the oblasts of Imereti and Armenia.

It was established on the basis of the law on administrative reform, approved by Emperor Nicholas I on 10 April 1840 under the title "Establishment for the administration of the Transcaucasian region", by uniting the territories of the abolished Georgian province, Armenian and Imereti regions. It was divided into 8 counties: Akhaltsikhe, Belokan (in 1844 it was separated into a separate Jar-Balakan district), Guria, Gori, Elizavetpol, Kutaisi, Telavi and Erivan.

The highest decree of 14 December 1846 introduced changes in the administrative-territorial organization of Transcaucasia. The whole region was divided into four provinces: Tiflis, Kutaisi, Shemakha and Derbent. The Georgian-Imereti province was abolished.

== Administrative divisions ==
At its creation the Georgia-Imeretia Governorate contained eight uyezds:

- Akhaltsikhe
- Belokan (from 1844 a separate Jar-Balakan Okrug)
- Guria
- Gori
- Elisabethpol
- Kutaisi
- Telavi
- Erivan
