= Signakh =

Signakh may refer to:

- Sığnaq, Azerbaijan
- Signakh uezd, county of the Russian empire, in modern-day Georgia
  - Sighnaghi (alternate spelling Signakh), Georgia, in Signakh uezd
