= Akhaltsikhe uezd =

Coordinates: 41°38′20″N 42°59′10″E

Akhaltsikhe uezd Ахалцихский уезд
- Uezd
- Coat of arms

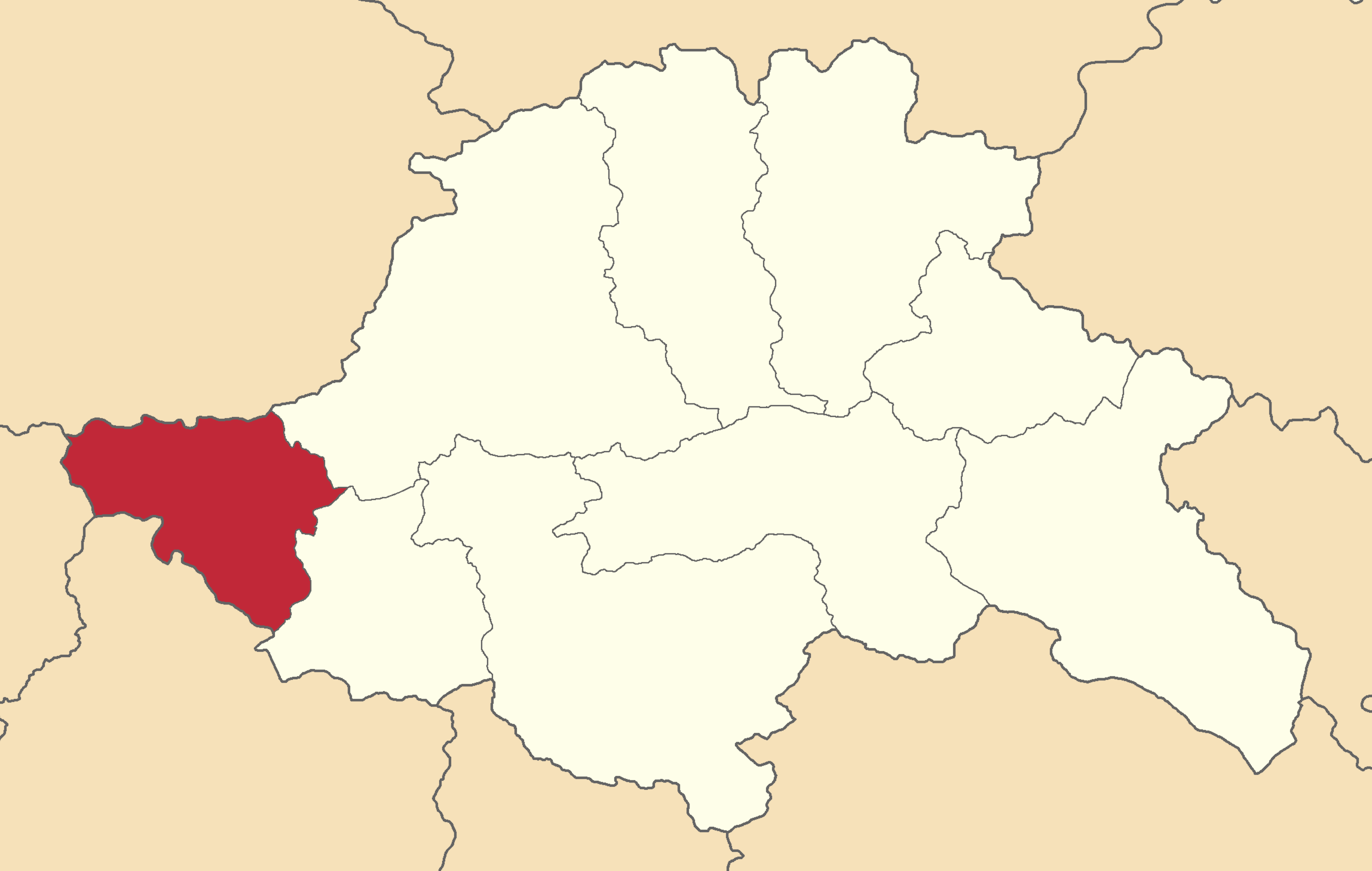
- Location in the Tiflis Governorate
- Country: Russian Empire
- Viceroyalty: Caucasus
- Governorate: Tiflis
- Established: 1840
- Abolished: 1930
- Capital: Akhaltsikh (present-day Akhaltsikhe)

Area
  - Total: 2,653.82 km^{2} (1,024.65 sq mi)

Population (1916)
  - Total: 96,947
  - Density: 36.531/km^{2} (94.615/sq mi)
  - Urban: 26.27%
  - Rural: 73.73%

The Akhaltsikhe uezd (Note: Russian: Ахалцихский уезд, pre-reform orthography: Ахалцихскій уѣздъ, romanized: Akhaltsikhskiy uyezd [ɐxəɫt͡sɨxskʲɪj ʊ(j)ɪst]; Georgian: ახალქალაქის მაზრა, romanized: akhalkalakis mazra [aχalkʰaɫakʰis mazɾa]; Armenian: Ախալցխայի գավառ, classical orthography: Ախալցխայի գաւառ, romanized: Axalc'xayi gawaṙ [ɑχɑlt͡sʰχɑˈji ɡɑˈvɑr] (Note: Western Armenian pronunciation: [ɑχɑlt͡sʰχɑˈji kʰɑˈvɑr]); Turkish: Ahıska kazası [ahɯska kazasɯ]) was a county (uezd) of the Tiflis Governorate of the Caucasus Viceroyalty of the Russian Empire, and then of Democratic Republic of Georgia, with its administrative center in Akhaltsikh (present-day Akhaltsikhe). The uezd bordered the Gori uezd and the Kutaisi Governorate to the north, the Akhalkalaki uezd to the east, the Ardahan Okrug of the Kars Oblast to the south, and the Batum Okrug of the Batum Oblast to the west. The area of the uezd corresponded to part of the contemporary Samtskhe-Javakheti region of Georgia.

== History ==
The territory of the Akhaltsikhe uezd, entered into the Kutais Governorate of the Russian Empire following the Russo-Turkish War of 1828. By 1840, the Аkhaltsikhe uezd was formed as a civilian district of the Tiflis Governorate. In 1874, the Akhalkalaki uezd was detached from it as a separate county.

Following the Russian Revolution, the Akhaltsikhe uezd was incorporated into the short-lived Democratic Republic of Georgia.

Lord Curzon during the Paris Peace Conference assessed the ethnographic situation in the southwestern uezds of the Tiflis Governorate:

On the grounds of nationality, therefore, these districts ought to belong to Armenia, but they command the heart of Georgia strategically, and on the whole it would seem equitable to assign them to Georgia, and give their Armenian inhabitants the option of emigration into the wide territories assigned to the Armenians towards the south-west.

== Administrative divisions ==
The subcounties (uchastoks) of the Akhaltsikhe uezd in 1913 were as follows:

| Name | 1912 population | Area |
|---|---|---|
| Atskhurskiy uchastok (Ацхурский участок) | 19,433 | 859.55 square versts (978.22 km^{2}; 377.69 mi^{2}) |
| Koblianskiy uchastok (Кобліанский участок) | 27,572 | 727.97 square versts (828.48 km^{2}; 319.88 mi^{2}) |
| Uravelskiy uchastok (Уравельский участок) | 20,230 | 744.46 square versts (847.24 km^{2}; 327.12 mi^{2}) |

== Demographics ==
=== 1897 Russian census ===
According to the 1897 Russian Empire census, the Akhaltsikhe uezd had a population of 68,837 on 28 January [O.S. 15 January] 1897, including 36,807 men and 32,030 women. The plurality of the population indicated Turkish to be their mother tongue, with significant Armenian, Tatar, (Note: Before 1918, Azerbaijanis were generally known as "Tatars". This term, employed by the Russians, referred to Turkic-speaking Muslims of the South Caucasus. After 1918, with the establishment of the Azerbaijan Democratic Republic and "especially during the Soviet era", the Tatar group identified itself as "Azerbaijani".) and Georgian speaking minorities.

Linguistic composition of the Akhaltsikhe uezd in 1897
| Language | Native speakers | % |
|---|---|---|
| Turkish | 24,137 | 35.06 |
| Armenian | 15,144 | 22.00 |
| Tatar | 12,370 | 17.97 |
| Georgian | 12,211 | 17.74 |
| Russian | 1,743 | 2.53 |
| Kurdish | 1,396 | 2.03 |
| Ukrainian | 490 | 0.71 |
| Jewish | 446 | 0.65 |
| Polish | 435 | 0.63 |
| Greek | 149 | 0.22 |
| German | 88 | 0.13 |
| Lithuanian | 88 | 0.13 |
| Chechen | 15 | 0.02 |
| Ossetian | 14 | 0.02 |
| Persian | 12 | 0.02 |
| Romanian | 12 | 0.02 |
| Assyrian | 10 | 0.01 |
| Avar-Andean | 6 | 0.01 |
| Belarusian | 5 | 0.01 |
| Czech | 5 | 0.01 |
| Kazi-Kumukh | 5 | 0.01 |
| Latvian | 3 | 0.00 |
| Chuvash | 2 | 0.00 |
| French | 2 | 0.00 |
| Imeretian | 2 | 0.00 |
| Kyurin | 1 | 0.00 |
| Talysh | 1 | 0.00 |
| Other | 45 | 0.07 |
| TOTAL | 68,837 | 100.00 |

=== Kavkazskiy kalendar ===
According to the 1917 publication of Kavkazskiy kalendar, the Akhaltsikhe uezd had a population of 96,947 on 14 January [O.S. 1 January] 1916, including 51,549 men and 45,398 women, 93,847 of whom were the permanent population, and 3,100 were temporary residents:

| Nationality | Urban | | Rural | | TOTAL | |
| Nationality | Number | % | Number | % | Number | % |
|---|---|---|---|---|---|---|
| Georgians | 2,783 | 10.93 | 42,709 | 59.75 | 45,492 | 46.92 |
| Armenians | 18,165 | 71.32 | 10,060 | 14.07 | 28,225 | 29.11 |
| Sunni Muslims (Note: Primarily Turco-Tatars.) | 30 | 0.12 | 16,680 | 23.34 | 16,710 | 17.24 |
| Jews | 3,246 | 12.74 | 5 | 0.01 | 3,251 | 3.35 |
| Kurds | 0 | 0.00 | 1,801 | 2.52 | 1,801 | 1.86 |
| Russians | 716 | 2.81 | 88 | 0.12 | 804 | 0.83 |
| Roma | 457 | 1.79 | 14 | 0.02 | 471 | 0.49 |
| Asiatic Christians | 0 | 0.00 | 89 | 0.12 | 89 | 0.09 |
| Other Europeans | 53 | 0.21 | 28 | 0.04 | 81 | 0.08 |
| North Caucasians | 16 | 0.06 | 3 | 0.00 | 19 | 0.02 |
| Shia Muslims (Note: Primarily Tatars.) | 4 | 0.02 | 0 | 0.00 | 4 | 0.00 |
| TOTAL | 25,470 | 100.00 | 71,477 | 100.00 | 96,947 | 100.00 |

== See also ==
- History of the administrative division of Russia

== Bibliography ==
- Bournoutian, George A. (2018). Armenia and Imperial Decline: The Yerevan Province, 1900–1914. Milton Park, Abingdon, Oxon: Routledge. ISBN 978-1-351-06260-2. OCLC 1037283914.
- Hovannisian, Richard G. (1971). The Republic of Armenia. Vol. 1: The First Year, 1918–1919. Berkeley: University of California Press. ISBN 978-0520019843.
- Кавказский календарь на 1913 год [Caucasian calendar for 1913] (in Russian) (68th ed.). Tiflis: Tipografiya kantselyarii Ye.I.V. na Kavkaze, kazenny dom. 1913. Archived from the original on 19 April 2022.
- Кавказский календарь на 1917 год [Caucasian calendar for 1917] (in Russian) (72nd ed.). Tiflis: Tipografiya kantselyarii Ye.I.V. na Kavkaze, kazenny dom. 1917. Archived from the original on 4 November 2021.
- Tsutsiev, Arthur (2014). Atlas of the Ethno-Political History of the Caucasus (PDF). Translated by Nora Seligman Favorov. New Haven: Yale University Press. ISBN 9780300153088. Archived (PDF) from the original on 17 June 2023.
