= MID =

MID or Mid may refer to:

== Computers and electronics ==
- MapInfo Interchange Format; .mid is also sometimes used as the filename extension for some MapInfo files
- Media Identification Code (MID code), a code indicating the manufacturer of a DVD
- Mobile Internet device, a category of mobile computer
- Molded interconnect device, an injection molded thermoplastic part with integrated electronic circuit traces
- Multiple interface declaration, a construct in some computer programming languages
- Musical Instrument Digital Interface, .mid is sometimes used as an alternate filename extension for MIDI files

== Medicine and biology ==
- Multi-infarct dementia, a disease also known as vascular dementia
- Minimal important difference, the smallest improvement felt to be meaningful by a patient
- Monocyte, a type of white blood cell in the innate immune system of vertebrates

== Military ==
- Maritime identification digits, a 3-digit code identifying the country of a ship/coastal station using communication equipment.
- Mentioned in dispatches, a military award for gallantry or otherwise commendable service
- Militarized interstate dispute, conflicts between states that do not involve full-scale wars
- Military Intelligence Division (United States), a former military intelligence branch of the United States Army
- Ministry of Interior and Defence, a former ministry of Singapore

== Organizations ==
- Integration and Development Movement, a political party in Argentina
- Ministry of Foreign Affairs (Russia), for which MID is a colloquial term
- Main Intelligence Directorate (disambiguation), intelligence services in multiple countries
- Monastic Interreligious Dialogue, the American arm of the DIMMID, an interfaith movement

== Other ==
- Mérida International Airport (IATA: MID)
- Middletown station (Pennsylvania) (Amtrak station code: MID)
- Modesto Irrigation District, a special district in California
- Mortgage interest deduction, a tax deduction for mortgage interest paid by homeowners
- Measuring Instruments Directive
- Mid vowel
- Midfielder, a position in association football
- Mid, a term meaning mediocre in 2020s slang
- Mið, the seventeenth album by Norwegian extreme metal band Enslaved

== See also ==
- MIDS (disambiguation)
