= Tianeti =

Tianeti თიანეთი
- Townlet
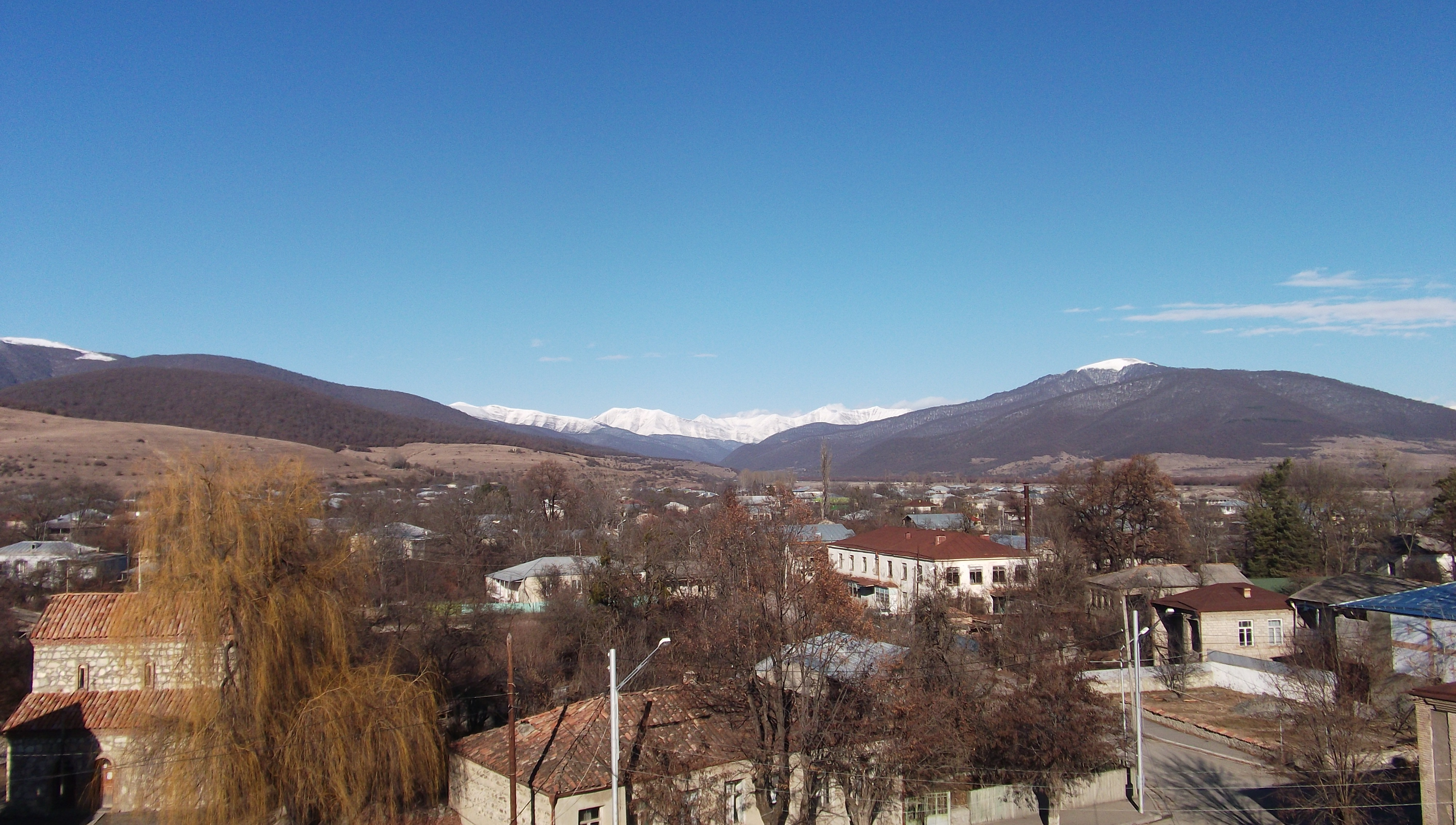
- View on Tianeti

- Location within Georgia Location within Mtskheta-Mtianeti
- Coordinates: 42°6′30″N 44°57′55″E
- Country: Georgia
- Mkhare: Mtskheta-Mtianeti
- Municipality: Tianeti
- Elevation: 1,100 m (3,600 ft)

Population (2014)
  - Total: 2,479
- Time zone: UTC+4 (Georgian Time)

Tianeti is a townlet in east-central Georgia, in the Caucasus Mountains. Tianeti is the administrative center of Municipality of Tianeti, which also comprises the town of Sioni and 43 neighbouring villages (total area – 907 km^{2}; population – 9,468, 2014 census). It was known as Tionets during the Russian Empire's rule and was the administrative center of the Tianeti Uyezd of the Tiflis Governorate.

Tianeti is situated in the North-Eastern part of Georgia (Mtskheta-Mtianeti region). According to the 2014 State Census, its population was 2,479 people. As studies conducted in 2003 on poverty in Georgia suggest, the Mtskheta-Mtianeti Region, and the Tianeti district in particular, are among the poorest regions and districts of Georgia. In 2003, 63% of Tianeti's population was below the poverty line, compared to 47% of the Georgian population (Labbate, Jamburia, Mirzashvili, 2003: 21).

According to the Ministry of Labor, Health and Social Affairs of Georgia, as of November 2008, 14% of Tianeti families were receiving social assistance in December 2008, compared to 8% countrywide. During the Soviet times, Tianeti was a district (‘rayon’) centre. Several food processing enterprises, factories, as well as poultry and meat producing farms were functioning in the district, providing employment opportunities for the local population (Georgian Soviet Encyclopedia 1979: pp. 678–679). Soviet cultural, medical and educational infrastructure was also developed there. In 2008, Tianeti was still the centre of the municipality (which is the contemporary analogue to the Soviet-era term ‘rayon’) with two secondary schools, two kindergartens, a vocational school, library, hospital and ethnographic museum. A municipal governance office, post office, and police station are also located in Tianeti. One of the Georgian banks has an office in Tianeti. There is a farmer's market, where most of the population purchases food, and several private grocery stores. None of the factories and farms that operated during the Soviet time are working today, and no new enterprises have been established. A small part of the population works at state institutions (so called “budget jobs”: schools, hospital, local self-governance, postal office, etc.). Products and/or income from subsistence farming contribute to a significant share of the local economy. However, Tianeti has a shortage of arable land (Labbate, Jamburia, Mirzashvili, 2003:21). In addition, the climate is quite severe. Thus, the population is sometimes unable to harvest crops before winter.

Adapted from: Tamar Zurabishvili, Tinatin Zurabishvili. 2012. Remittances in Provincial Georgia: The Case of Daba Tianeti. In: Migrant Marginality: A Transnational Perspective. Routledge.

== Climate ==
Climate data for Tianeti (1991–2020)
Month	Jan	Feb	Mar	Apr	May	Jun	Jul	Aug	Sep	Oct	Nov	Dec	Year
Record high °C (°F)	15.8 (60.4)	16.4 (61.5)	23.2 (73.8)	30.0 (86.0)	29.0 (84.2)	32.0 (89.6)	38.0 (100.4)	40.0 (104.0)	33.7 (92.7)	28.7 (83.7)	21.1 (70.0)	16.0 (60.8)	40.0 (104.0)
Mean daily maximum °C (°F)	3.1 (37.6)	4.7 (40.5)	8.8 (47.8)	13.8 (56.8)	18.9 (66.0)	23.3 (73.9)	26.3 (79.3)	26.4 (79.5)	21.6 (70.9)	16.2 (61.2)	9.7 (49.5)	4.9 (40.8)	14.8 (58.6)
Mean daily minimum °C (°F)	−7.8 (18.0)	−6.6 (20.1)	−1.8 (28.8)	3.2 (37.8)	8.0 (46.4)	11.8 (53.2)	14.3 (57.7)	13.9 (57.0)	9.7 (49.5)	5.0 (41.0)	−1.0 (30.2)	−6.0 (21.2)	3.6 (38.5)
Record low °C (°F)	−26.1 (−15.0)	−24.8 (−12.6)	−15.0 (5.0)	−9.6 (14.7)	−2.5 (27.5)	4.0 (39.2)	6.1 (43.0)	7.0 (44.6)	1.0 (33.8)	−5.3 (22.5)	−16.0 (3.2)	−23.5 (−10.3)	−26.1 (−15.0)
Average precipitation mm (inches)	26.5 (1.04)	28.7 (1.13)	41.2 (1.62)	73.3 (2.89)	90.8 (3.57)	85.5 (3.37)	57.5 (2.26)	56.4 (2.22)	50.6 (1.99)	62.0 (2.44)	36.5 (1.44)	30.1 (1.19)	639.2 (25.17)
Average precipitation days (≥ 1.0 mm)	5.6	5.4	7.0	10.0	11.8	9.4	6.9	6.3	6.1	7.6	5.5	5.1	86.7
Source: NOAA

== See also ==
- Mtskheta-Mtianeti
