= Tiflis Governorate =

Governorate of the Russian Empire

Coordinates: 41.7167°N 44.7833°E

Tiflis Governorate Тифлисская губерния
- Governorate
- Coat of arms

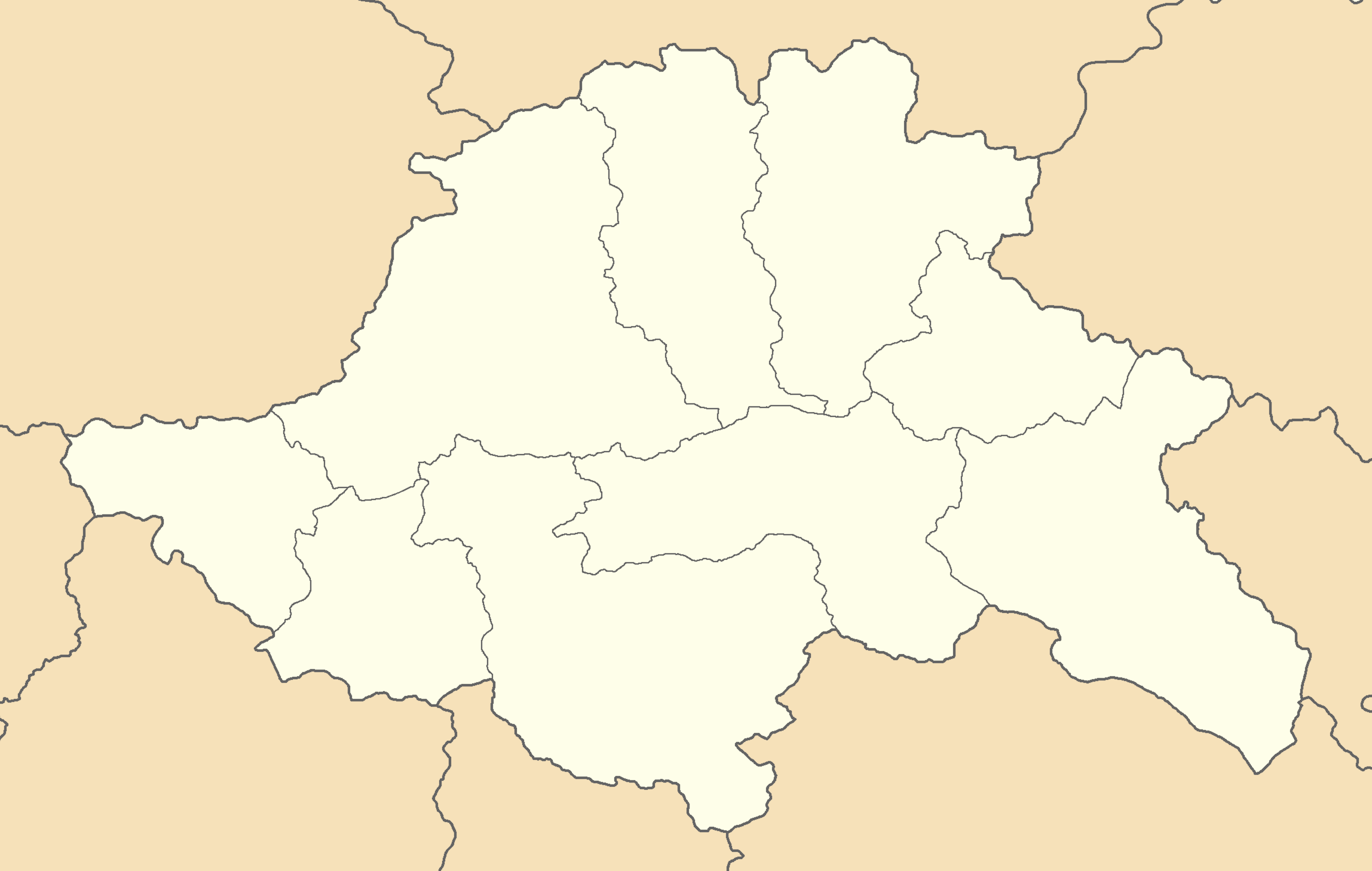
- Administrative map of the Tiflis Governorate
- Country: Russian Empire
- Viceroyalty: Caucasus
- Established: 1846
- Abolished: 1917
- Capital: Tiflis (present-day Tbilisi)

Area
  - Total: 40,861.03 km^{2} (15,776.53 sq mi)
- Highest elevation (Mount Kazbek): 5,034 m (16,516 ft)

Population (1916)
  - Total: 1,473,308
  - Density: 36.05656/km^{2} (93.38605/sq mi)
  - Urban: 40.90%
  - Rural: 59.10%

Tiflis Governorate (Note: Russian: Тифли́сская губе́рния, pre-reform orthography: Тифли́сская губе́рнія, romanized: Tiflísskaya gubérniya; Georgian: ტფილისის გუბერნია, romanized: t'pilisis gubernia; Armenian: Թիֆլիսի նահանգ, romanized: Tʼiflisi nahang) was a province (guberniya) of the Caucasus Viceroyalty of the Russian Empire with its administrative centre in Tiflis (present-day Tbilisi). In 1897, it constituted 44,607 square kilometres (17,223 sq mi) in area and had a population of 1,051,032 inhabitants. Tiflis Governorate bordered Elizavetpol Governorate to the southeast, Erivan Governorate to the south, Kars Oblast to the southwest, Batum Oblast to the west, Kutaisi Governorate to the northwest, Terek Oblast to the north, Dagestan Oblast to the northeast, and after 1905, the Zakatal Okrug to the east. The governorate covered areas of central and southeastern Georgia, the partially recognised state of South Ossetia, most of the Lori Province of Armenia, small parts of northwestern Azerbaijan, and a minuscule southern part of Ingushetia of Russia.

== History ==
Tiflis Governorate was established in 1846 along with the Kutaisi Governorate, after the dissolution of the Georgia-Imeretia Governorate. It was initially formed from uezds of Tiflis, Gori, Telavi, Signakh, Elizavetpol, Erivan, Nakhichevan and Alexandropol and the okrugs of Zakatal, Ossetian and Tushino-Pshavo-Khevsurian. In 1849, uezds of Erivan, Nakhichevan and Alexandropol were attached to Erivan Governorate. In 1859, the Ossetian Okrug became part of Gori district and Tushino-Pshavo-Khevsurian Okrug was renamed to Tionety Okrug. In 1867, the northern part of Tiflis uezd was separated into the Dusheti uezd, while Akhaltsikhe uezd which was created after ceding from Ottoman Empire to Russian Empire in 1829, was detached from Kutaisi Governorate and part of Tiflis one. In 1868 Elizavetpol uezd (in the same decree, the Kazakh uezd was formed from it) became a part of the Elizavetpol Governorate. In 1874, the southern part of Akhaltsikhe uezd became the Akhalkalaki uezd, and the Tionety okrug was elevated to an uezd. Finally, the southern part of Tiflis uezd was detached to become the Borchaly uezd.

The Tiflis Governorate lasted within these boundaries for some 50 years until the Russian Revolution and subsequent founding of the Democratic Republic of Georgia in 1918. The governorate and its counties were soon abolished after its incorporation into the Soviet Union and reorganised into the raions (counties) of the Georgian SSR by 1930.

== Administrative divisions ==
The counties (uezds) of the Tiflis Governorate in 1917 were as follows:

Name	Administrative centre			Population		Area
Name		1897	1916	1897	1916	Area
Akhalkalaki uezd (Ахалкалакскій уѣздъ)	Akhalkalaki	5,440	7,055	72,709	107,173	2,407.00 square versts (2,739.32 km^{2}; 1,057.66 mi^{2})
Akhaltsikhe uezd (Ахалцихскій уѣздъ)	Akhaltsikhe	15,357	25,470	68,837	96,947	2,331.88 square versts (2,653.82 km^{2}; 1,024.65 mi^{2})
Borchaly uezd (Борчалинскій уѣздъ)	Shulavery (Shaumiani)	4,553	---	128,587	169,351	6,046.96 square versts (6,881.82 km^{2}; 2,657.08 mi^{2})
Gori uezd (Горійскій уѣздъ)	Gori	10,269	18,454	191,091	241,016	6,007.56 square versts (6,836.98 km^{2}; 2,639.77 mi^{2})
Dusheti uezd (Душетскій уѣздъ)	Dushet (Dusheti)	2,566	---	67,719	66,430	3,411.80 square versts (3,882.84 km^{2}; 1,499.17 mi^{2})
Signakh uezd (Сигнахскій уѣздъ)	Signakh (Signagi)	8,994	17,662	102,313	153,864	5,291.79 square versts (6,022.39 km^{2}; 2,325.26 mi^{2})
Telavi uezd (Телавскій уѣздъ)	Telav (Telavi)	13,929	---	66,767	67,955	2,162.91 square versts (2,461.53 km^{2}; 950.40 mi^{2})
Tiflis uezd (Тифлисскій уѣздъ)	Tiflis (Tbilisi)	159,590	346,766	234,632	521,222	4,004.08 square versts (4,556.89 km^{2}; 1,759.43 mi^{2})
Tionety uezd (Тіонетскій уѣздъ)	Tioneti (Tianeti)	1,089	---	34,153	49,350	4,250.06 square versts (4,836.83 km^{2}; 1,867.51 mi^{2})
Zakatal okrug (Закатальскій округъ)	Zakataly (Zaqatala)	3,009	4,505	84,224	(Note: The Zakatal Okrug was detached from the Tiflis Governorate in 1905 to be administered separately. As a special administrative okrug, Zakatal's population in 1916 was 92,608.)	3,502.24 square versts (3,985.77 km^{2}; 1,538.91 mi^{2})

== Demographics ==
=== Russian Empire Census ===
According to the Russian Empire Census, the Tiflis Governorate had a population of 1,051,032 on 28 January [O.S. 16 January] 1897, including 575,447 men and 475,585 women. The plurality of the population indicated Georgian to be their mother tongue, with significant Armenian, Tatar, (Note: Before 1918, Azerbaijanis were generally known as "Tatars". This term, employed by the Russians, referred to Turkic-speaking Muslims of the South Caucasus. After 1918, with the establishment of the Azerbaijan Democratic Republic and "especially during the Soviet era", the Tatar group identified itself as "Azerbaijani".) Russian, and Ossetian speaking minorities.

Linguistic composition of the Tiflis Governorate in 1897
Language	Native speakers	%
Georgian	465,537	44.29
Armenian	196,189	18.67
Tatar	107,383	10.22
Russian	79,082	7.52
Ossetian	67,268	6.40
Avar-Andean	34,130	3.25
Greek	27,118	2.58
Turkish	24,722	2.35
German	8,340	0.79
Dargin	7,565	0.72
Ukrainian	6,443	0.61
Polish	6,282	0.60
Jewish	5,188	0.49
Kurdish	2,538	0.24
Chechen	2,207	0.21
Persian	1,991	0.19
Assyrian	1,570	0.15
Imeretian	1,546	0.15
Lithuanian	1,263	0.12
Kyurin	1,149	0.11
Mingrelian	498	0.05
French	356	0.03
Kist	296	0.03
Italian	259	0.02
Belarusian	247	0.02
Czech	229	0.02
Romanian	198	0.02
Kazi-Kumukh	197	0.02
Talysh	152	0.01
Chuvash	148	0.01
Latvian	123	0.01
Other	818	0.08
TOTAL	1,051,032	100.00

Religious composition of the Tiflis Governorate in 1897
Faith	Male	Female	Both	
Faith	Male	Female	Number	%
Eastern Orthodox	319,930	264,891	584,821	55.64
Armenian Apostolic	113,399	96,762	210,161	20.00
Muslim	104,500	84,528	189,028	17.98
Armenian Catholic	10,363	9,853	20,216	1.92
Old Believer	8,156	8,053	16,209	1.54
Roman Catholic	8,630	2,914	11,544	1.10
Judaism	5,642	4,068	9,710	0.92
Lutheran	4,221	4,257	8,478	0.81
Baptist	142	122	264	0.03
Reformed	44	31	75	0.01
Karaite	10	5	15	0.00
Anglican	2	7	9	0.00
Buddhist	3	2	5	0.00
Mennonite	2	3	5	0.00
Other Christian denomination	183	10	193	0.02
Other non-Christian denomination	220	79	299	0.03
TOTAL	575,447	475,585	1,051,032	100.00

Linguistic composition of uezds in the Tiflis Governorate in 1897

Uezd	Georgian		Armenian		Tatar and Turkish		Russian		Ossetian		TOTAL
Uezd	Number	%	Number	%	Number	%	Number	%	Number	%	TOTAL
Akhalkalaki	6,448	8.87	52,539	72.26	6,868	9.45	5,155	7.09	4	0.01	72,709
Akhaltsikhe	12,211	17.74	15,144	22.00	36,507	53.03	1,743	2.53	14	0.02	68,837
Borchaly	7,840	6.1	47,423	36.88	37,904	29.48	8,089	6.29	628	0.49	128,587
Gori	124,180	64.98	7,686	4.02	470	0.25	5,281	2.76	50,036	26.18	191,091
Dusheti	49,690	73.38	1,680	2.48	405	0.6	980	1.45	14,523	21.45	67,719
Signakh	84,827	82.91	6,392	6.25	5,272	5.15	4,413	4.31	30	0.03	102,313
Telavi	57,357	85.91	4,754	7.12	1,878	2.81	694	1.04	88	0.13	66,767
Tiflis	80,293	34.22	57,933	24.69	12,835	5.47	51,775	22.07	1,712	0.73	234,632
Tionety	30,302	88.72	538	1.58	13	0.04	637	1.87	227	0.66	34,153
Zakatal	12,389	14.71	2,100	2.49	28,953	34.38	315	0.37	6	0.01	84,224
TOTAL	465,537	44.29	196,189	18.67	132,105	12.57	79,082	7.52	67,268	6.40	1,051,032

=== Kavkazskiy kalendar ===
According to the 1917 publication of Kavkazskiy kalendar, the Tiflis Governorate had a population of 1,473,308 on 14 January [O.S. 1 January] 1916, including 780,010 men and 693,298 women, 1,255,176 of whom were the permanent population, and 218,132 were temporary residents:

Nationality	Urban		Rural		TOTAL	
Nationality	Number	%	Number	%	Number	%
Georgians	62,627	14.64	580,009	55.47	642,636	43.62
Armenians	197,916	46.28	213,831	20.45	411,747	27.95
Russians	94,885	22.19	57,924	5.54	152,809	10.37
Sunni Muslims (Note: Primarily Turco-Tatars.)	6,353	1.49	61,164	5.85	67,517	4.58
Asiatic Christians	19,560	4.57	36,410	3.48	55,970	3.80
North Caucasians	2,714	0.63	45,037	4.31	47,751	3.24
Shia Muslims (Note: Primarily Tatars.)	9,434	2.21	29,548	2.83	38,982	2.65
Other Europeans	12,058	2.82	12,845	1.23	24,903	1.69
Jews	14,296	3.34	4,948	0.47	19,244	1.31
Kurds	2,279	0.53	3,653	0.35	5,932	0.40
Yazidis	4,697	1.10	0	0.00	4,697	0.32
Roma	851	0.20	269	0.03	1,120	0.08
TOTAL	427,670	100.00	1,045,638	100.00	1,473,308	100.00

== Governors ==
The administration tasks in the governorate were executed by a governor. Sometimes, a military governor was appointed as well. The governors of Tiflis Governorate were

- 1847–1849 Sergei Nikolayevich Yermolov, governor;
- 1849–1855 Ivan Malkhazovich Andronnikov (Andronikashvili), military governor;
- 1855–1857 Nikolay Yevgenyevich Lukash, military governor;
- 1858–1860 Alexander Khristianovich Kapger, military governor;
- 1860–1876 Konstantin Ivanovich Orlovsky, governor;
- 1876–1878 Maximilian von der Osten-Sacken, governor;
- 1878–1883 Konstantin Dmitriyevich Gagarin, governor;
- 1883–1887 Alexander Ignatyevich Grosman, governor;
- 1887–1889 Karl Leo Sissermann, governor;
- 1889–1897 Georgy Dmitriyevich Shervashidze (Giorgi Shervashidze), governor;
- 1897–1899 Fyodor Alexandrovich Bykov, governor;
- 1899–1905 Ivan Nikolayevich Svechin, governor;
- 1905–1907 Paul Bernhard Demetrius Rausch von Traubenberg, governor;
- 1907–1911 Mikhail Alexandrovich Lyubich-Yarmolovich-Lozina-Lozinsky, governor;
- 1911–1914 Andrei Gavrilovich Chernyavsky, governor;
- 1914–1916 Ivan Mikhaylovich Strakhovsky, governor;
- 1916–1917 Alexander Nikolayevich Mandrika, acting governor.

== Bibliography ==
- Bournoutian, George A. (2018). Armenia and Imperial Decline: The Yerevan Province, 1900–1914. Milton Park, Abingdon, Oxon: Routledge. ISBN 978-1-351-06260-2. OCLC 1037283914.
- Hovannisian, Richard G. (1971). The Republic of Armenia. Vol. 1: The First Year, 1918–1919. Berkeley: University of California Press. ISBN 978-0520019843.
- Кавказский календарь на 1917 год [Caucasian calendar for 1917] (in Russian) (72nd ed.). Tiflis: Tipografiya kantselyarii Ye.I.V. na Kavkaze, kazenny dom. 1917. Archived from the original on 4 November 2021.
- Tsutsiev, Arthur (2014). Atlas of the Ethno-Political History of the Caucasus (PDF). Translated by Nora Seligman Favorov. New Haven: Yale University Press. ISBN 9780300153088. Archived (PDF) from the original on 17 June 2023.
