= MIDS =

MIDS may refer to:

- Madras Institute of Development Studies, Chennai, Tamil Nadu, India
- Master of Information and Data Science, a professional degree offered by University of California, Berkeley School of Information
- Multifunctional Information Distribution System, a communication component
- A nickname for Mid-Annandale F.C., in Lockerbie, Scotland

== See also ==
- MID (disambiguation)
