= Dusheti uezd =

Coordinates: 42°5′0″N 44°42′0″E

Dusheti uezd Душетскій уѣздъ
- Uezd
- Coat of arms

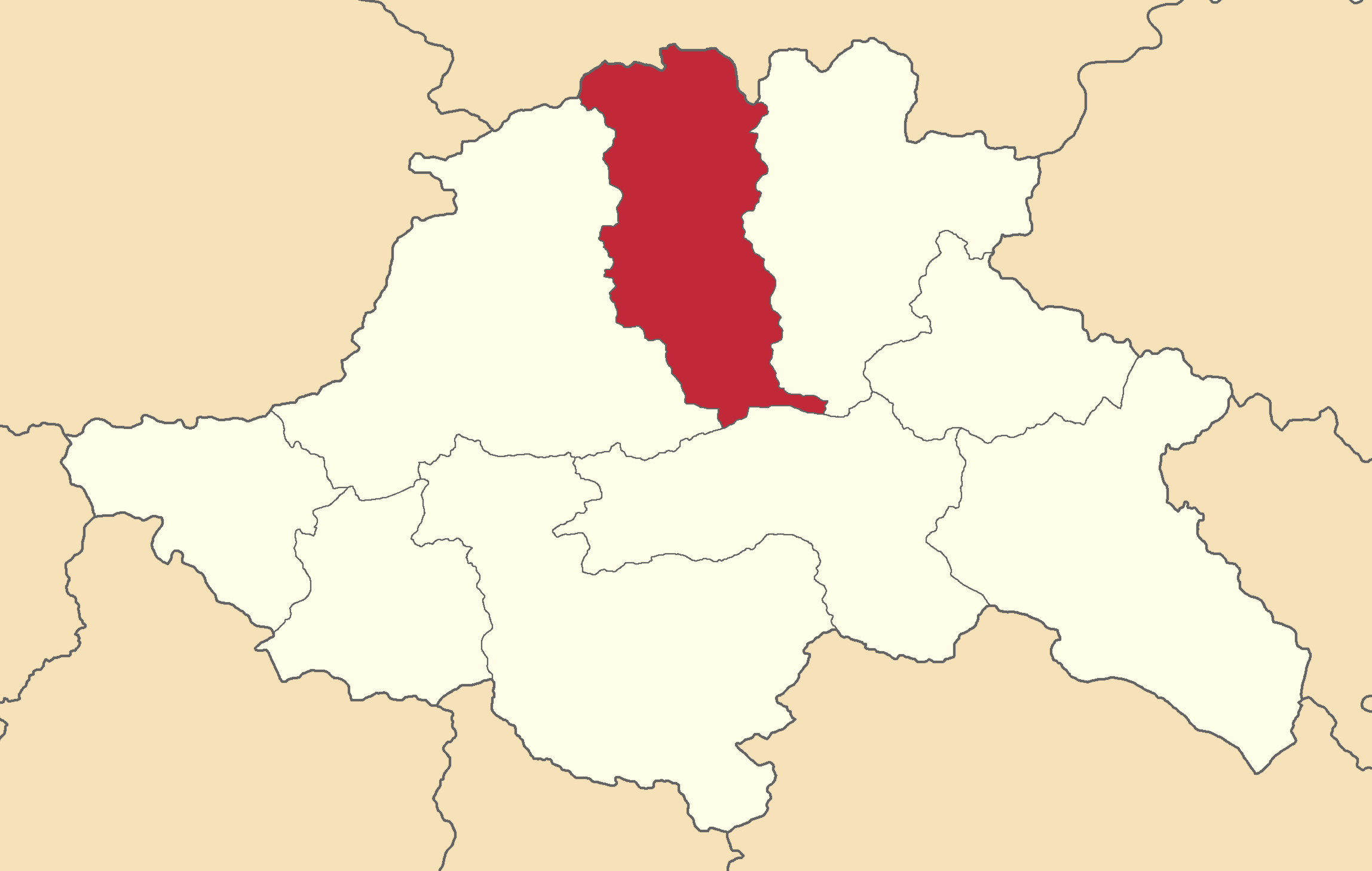
- Location in the Tiflis Governorate
- Country: Russian Empire
- Viceroyalty: Caucasus
- Governorate: Tiflis
- Established: 1802
- Abolished: 1929
- Capital: Dushet (present-day Dusheti)

Area
  - Total: 3,882.84 km^{2} (1,499.17 sq mi)

Population (1916)
  - Total: 66,430
  - Density: 17.11/km^{2} (44.31/sq mi)
  - Urban: 3.37%
  - Rural: 96.63%

The Dusheti uezd (Note: Russian: Душе́тскій уѣ́здъ, romanized: Dushétsky uyézd; Georgian: დუშეთის მაზრა, romanized: dushetis mazra) was a county (uezd) of the Tiflis Governorate of the Caucasus Viceroyalty of the Russian Empire, and then of Democratic Republic of Georgia, with its administrative centre in Dushet (present-day Dusheti). The area of the uezd roughly corresponded to the contemporary Mtskheta-Mtianeti region of Georgia.

== History ==
In April 1906, Dusheti witnessed one of the largest robberies of the Tsarist treasury when militant members of the Georgian Socialist-Federalist Revolutionary Party under the leadership of Leo Kereselidze expropriated 315,000 rubles from its holdings. This politically-motivated heist was of comparable scale as the subsequent 1907 Tiflis bank robbery conducted by the Bolsheviks.

Following the Russian Revolution, the Dusheti uezd was incorporated into the short-lived Democratic Republic of Georgia.

== Administrative divisions ==
The subcounties (uchastoks) of the Dusheti uezd in 1913 were as follows:

Name	1912 population	Area
Bazaletskiy uchastok (Базалетскій участокъ)	14,812	579.02 square versts (658.96 km^{2}; 254.43 mi^{2})
Kvishetskiy uchastok (Квишетскій участокъ)	22,882	1,518.08 square versts (1,727.67 km^{2}; 667.06 mi^{2})
Ksanskiy uchastok (Ксанскій участокъ)	14,732	800.15 square versts (910.62 km^{2}; 351.59 mi^{2})
Mtskhetskiy uchastok (Мцхетскій участокъ)	15,930	514.55 square versts (585.59 km^{2}; 226.10 mi^{2})

== Demographics ==
=== 1897 Russian census ===
According to the 1897 Russian Empire census, the Dusheti uezd had a population of 67,719 on 28 January [O.S. 15 January] 1897, including 35,848 men and 31,871 women. The majority of the population indicated Georgian to be their mother tongue, with a significant Ossetian speaking minority.

Linguistic composition of the Dusheti uezd in 1897
Language	Native speakers	%
Georgian	49,690	73.38
Ossetian	14,523	21.45
Armenian	1,680	2.48
Russian	980	1.45
Tatar (Note: Before 1918, Azerbaijanis were generally known as "Tatars". This term, employed by the Russians, referred to Turkic-speaking Muslims of the South Caucasus. After 1918, with the establishment of the Azerbaijan Democratic Republic and "especially during the Soviet era", the Tatar group identified itself as "Azerbaijani".)	405	0.60
Assyrian	121	0.18
Mingrelian	54	0.08
Ukrainian	53	0.08
Polish	43	0.06
Jewish	24	0.04
Avar-Andean	17	0.03
Persian	15	0.02
Imeretian	14	0.02
German	13	0.02
Kyurin	10	0.01
Greek	8	0.01
Dargin	7	0.01
Lithuanian	4	0.01
Kurdish	3	0.00
Belarusian	2	0.00
Chechen	2	0.00
Kazi-Kumukh	2	0.00
Romanian	1	0.00
Chuvash	1	0.00
Other	47	0.07
TOTAL	67,719	100.00

=== Kavkazskiy kalendar ===
According to the 1917 publication of Kavkazskiy kalendar, the Dusheti uezd had a population of 66,430 on 14 January [O.S. 1 January] 1916, including 32,949 men and 33,481 women, 65,737 of whom were the permanent population, and 693 were temporary residents:

Nationality	Urban		Rural		TOTAL	
Nationality	Number	%	Number	%	Number	%
Georgians	1,165	52.08	56,430	87.91	57,595	86.70
North Caucasians	5	0.22	4,614	7.19	4,619	6.95
Armenians	998	44.61	2,673	4.16	3,671	5.53
Russians	52	2.32	218	0.34	270	0.41
Other Europeans	16	0.72	109	0.17	125	0.19
Shia Muslims (Note: Primarily Tatars.)	0	0.00	61	0.10	61	0.09
Jews	1	0.04	59	0.09	60	0.09
Sunni Muslims (Note: Primarily Turco-Tatars.)	0	0.00	29	0.05	29	0.04
TOTAL	2,237	100.00	64,193	100.00	66,430	100.00

== See also ==
- History of the administrative division of Russia

== Bibliography ==
- Bournoutian, George A. (2018). Armenia and Imperial Decline: The Yerevan Province, 1900–1914. Milton Park, Abingdon, Oxon: Routledge. ISBN 978-1-351-06260-2. OCLC 1037283914.
- Hovannisian, Richard G. (1971). The Republic of Armenia. Vol. 1: The First Year, 1918–1919. Berkeley: University of California Press. ISBN 978-0520019843.
- Кавказский календарь на 1913 год [Caucasian calendar for 1913] (in Russian) (68th ed.). Tiflis: Tipografiya kantselyarii Ye.I.V. na Kavkaze, kazenny dom. 1913. Archived from the original on 19 April 2022.
- Кавказский календарь на 1917 год [Caucasian calendar for 1917] (in Russian) (72nd ed.). Tiflis: Tipografiya kantselyarii Ye.I.V. na Kavkaze, kazenny dom. 1917. Archived from the original on 4 November 2021.
- Tsutsiev, Arthur (2014). Atlas of the Ethno-Political History of the Caucasus (PDF). Translated by Nora Seligman Favorov. New Haven: Yale University Press. ISBN 9780300153088. Archived (PDF) from the original on 17 June 2023.
