= Tionety uezd =

Coordinates: 42°6′30″N 44°57′55″E

Tionety uezd Тіонетскій уѣздъ
- Uezd
- Coat of arms

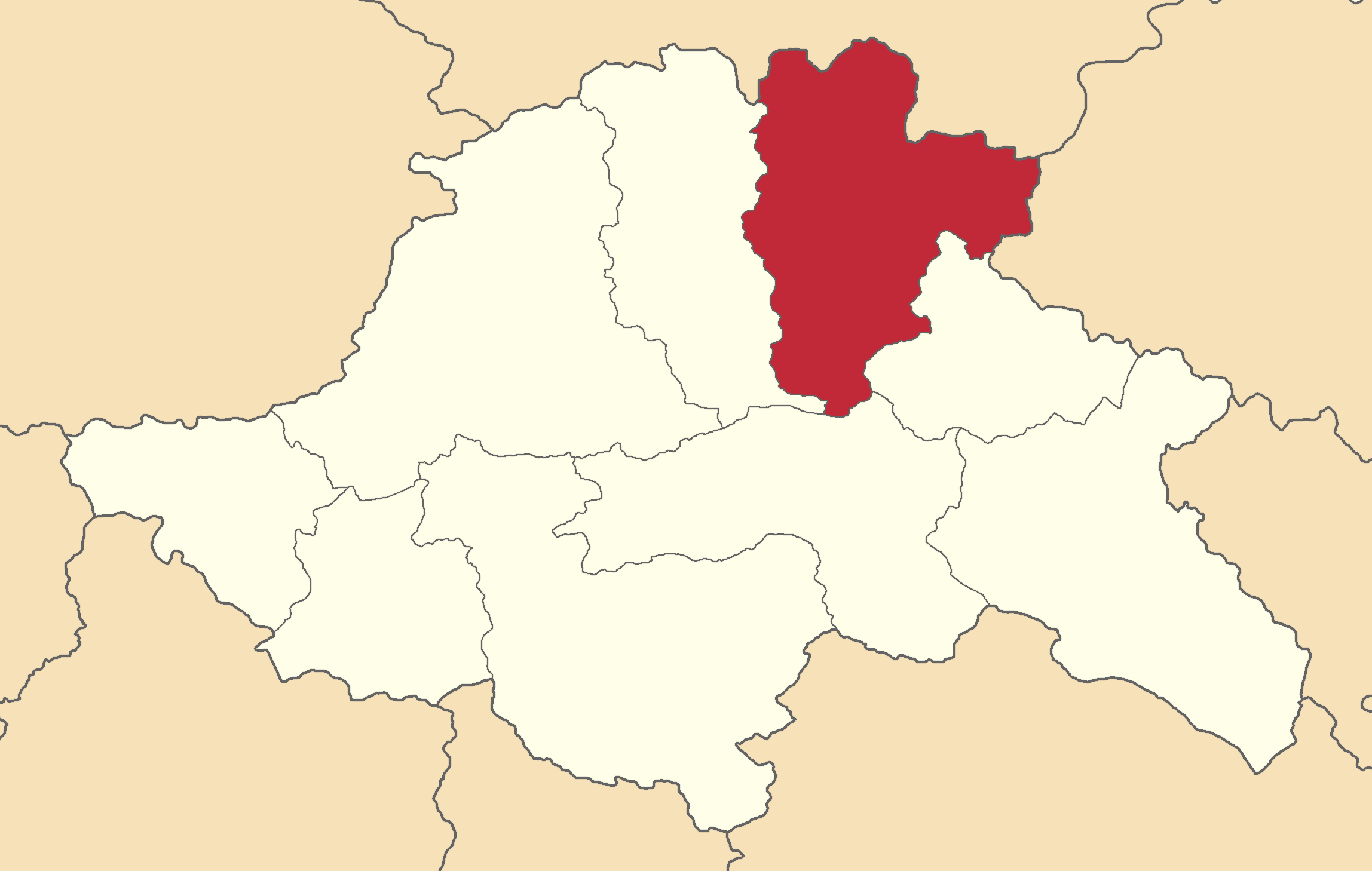
- Location in the Tiflis Governorate
- Country: Russian Empire
- Governorate: Tiflis
- Viceroyalty: Caucasus
- Established: 1874
- Abolished: 1930
- Capital: Tionety (present-day Tianeti)

Area
  - Total: 4,836.83 km^{2} (1,867.51 sq mi)

Population (1916)
  - Total: 49,350
  - Density: 10.20/km^{2} (26.43/sq mi)
  - Rural: 100.00%

The Tionety uezd (Note: Russian: Тіоне́тскій уѣ́здъ, romanized: Tionétsky uyézd; Georgian: თიანეთის მაზრა, romanized: tianetis mazra) was a county (uezd) of the Tiflis Governorate of the Caucasus Viceroyalty of the Russian Empire, and then of Democratic Republic of Georgia, with its administrative centre in Tionety (present-day Tianeti). The area of the uezd roughly corresponded to the contemporary Mtskheta-Mtianeti region of Georgia.

== History ==
Following the Russian Revolution, the Tionety uezd was incorporated into the short-lived Democratic Republic of Georgia.

== Administrative divisions ==
The subcounties (uchastoks) of the Tionety uezd in 1913 were as follows:

Name	1912 population	Area
Pshavo-Khevsuretskiy uchastok (Пшаво-Хевсуретскій участокъ)	13,967	1,781.87 square versts (2,027.88 km^{2}; 782.97 mi^{2})
Tushino-Kakhetinskiy uchastok (Тушино-Кахетинскій участокъ)	13,017	1,601.16 square versts (1,822.22 km^{2}; 703.56 mi^{2})
Ertsoyskiy uchastok (Эрцойскій участокъ)	16,403	867.03 square versts (986.73 km^{2}; 380.98 mi^{2})

== Demographics ==
=== 1897 Russian census ===
According to the 1897 Russian Empire census, the Tionety uezd had a population of 34,153 on 28 January [O.S. 15 January] 1897, including 16,431 men and 17,722 women. The majority of the population indicated Georgian to be their mother tongue, with a significant Chechen speaking minority.

Linguistic composition of the Tionety uezd in 1897
Language	Native speakers	%
Georgian	30,302	88.72
Chechen	2,113	6.19
Russian	637	1.87
Armenian	538	1.58
Kist	284	0.83
Ossetian	227	0.66
Persian	24	0.07
Turkish	10	0.03
Avar-Andean	6	0.02
Greek	5	0.01
Tatar (Note: Prior to 1918, Azerbaijanis were generally known as "Tatars". This term, employed by the Russians, referred to Turkic-speaking Muslims of the South Caucasus. After 1918 with the establishment of the Azerbaijan Democratic Republic, and "especially during the Soviet era", the Tatar group identified itself as "Azerbaijani".)	3	0.01
Belarusian	1	0.00
French	1	0.00
Jewish	1	0.00
Polish	1	0.00
TOTAL	34,153	100.00

=== Kavkazskiy kalendar ===
According to the 1917 publication of Kavkazskiy kalendar, the Tionety uezd had a population of 49,350 on 14 January [O.S. 1 January] 1916, including 24,402 men and 24,948 women, 48,666 of whom were the permanent population, and 684 were temporary residents:

Nationality	Number	%
Georgians	47,515	96.28
Armenians	1,726	3.50
Russians	56	0.11
North Caucasians	39	0.08
Jews	12	0.02
Other Europeans	2	0.00
TOTAL	49,350	100.00

== See also ==
- History of the administrative division of Russia

== Bibliography ==
- Bournoutian, George A. (2018). Armenia and Imperial Decline: The Yerevan Province, 1900–1914. Milton Park, Abingdon, Oxon: Routledge. ISBN 978-1-351-06260-2. OCLC 1037283914.
- Hovannisian, Richard G. (1971). The Republic of Armenia. Vol. 1: The First Year, 1918–1919. Berkeley: University of California Press. ISBN 978-0520019843.
- Кавказский календарь на 1913 год [Caucasian calendar for 1913] (in Russian) (68th ed.). Tiflis: Tipografiya kantselyarii Ye.I.V. na Kavkaze, kazenny dom. 1913. Archived from the original on 19 April 2022.
- Кавказский календарь на 1917 год [Caucasian calendar for 1917] (in Russian) (72nd ed.). Tiflis: Tipografiya kantselyarii Ye.I.V. na Kavkaze, kazenny dom. 1917. Archived from the original on 4 November 2021.
- Kazemzadeh, Firuz (1951). The Struggle for Transcaucasia (1917–1921). New York City: Philosophical Library. OCLC 1943521.
- Tsutsiev, Arthur (2014). Atlas of the Ethno-Political History of the Caucasus (PDF). Translated by Nora Seligman Favorov. New Haven: Yale University Press. ISBN 9780300153088. Archived (PDF) from the original on 17 June 2023.
