= Borchaly uezd =

Coordinates: 41°20′38″N 44°45′30″E

Borchaly uezd Борчалинскій уѣздъ
- Uezd
- Coat of arms

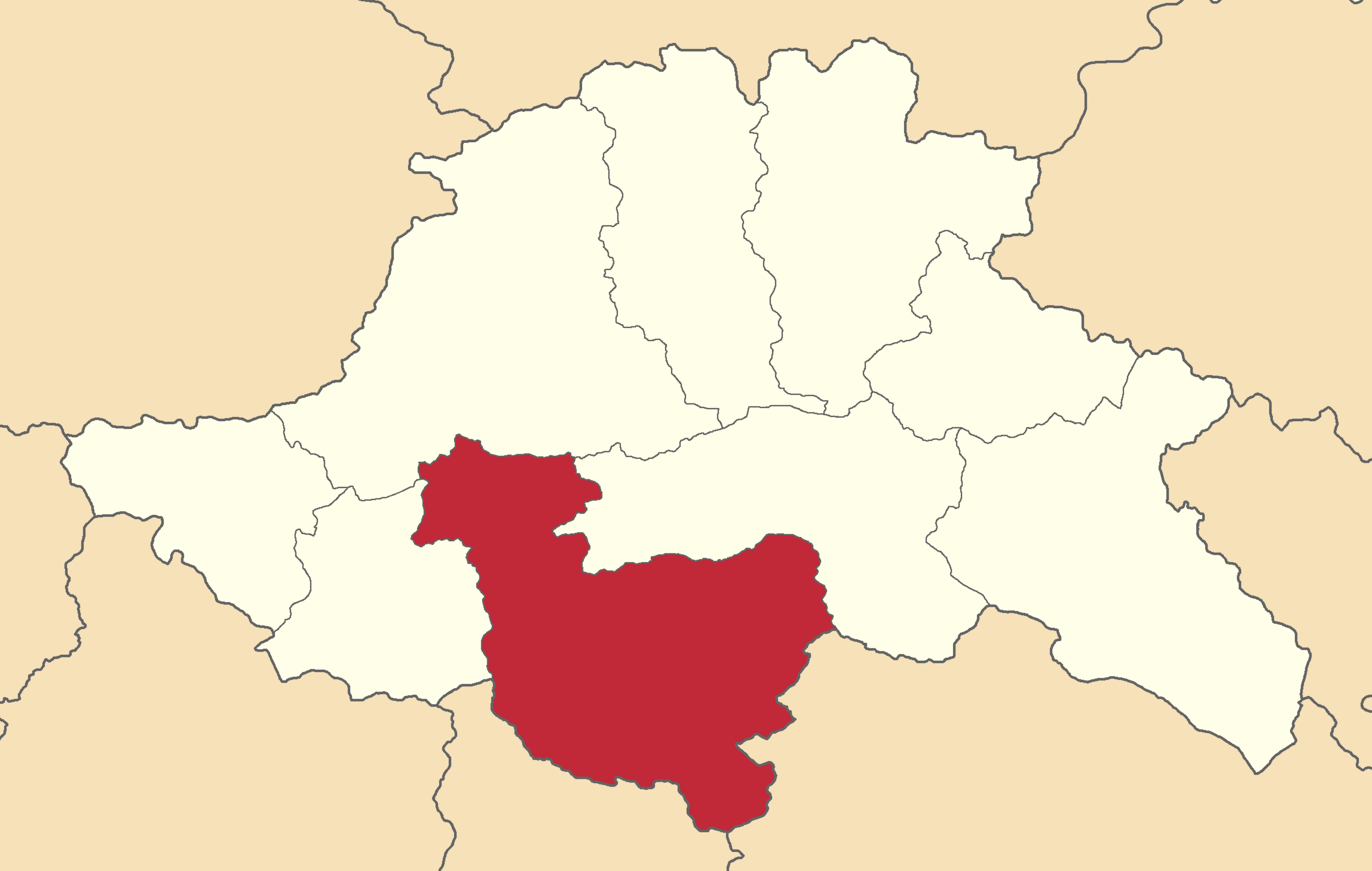
- Location in the Tiflis Governorate
- Country: Russian Empire
- Viceroyalty: Caucasus
- Governorate: Tiflis
- Established: 1880
- Abolished: 1929
- Capital: Shulavery (present-day Shaumiani)

Area
  - Total: 6,881.82 km^{2} (2,657.09 sq mi)

Population (1916)
  - Total: 169,351
  - Density: 24.6085/km^{2} (63.7356/sq mi)
  - Rural: 100.00%

The Borchaly uezd (Note: Russian: Борчали́нскій уѣ́здъ, romanized: Borchalínsky uyézd; Georgian: ბორჩალოს მაზრა, romanized: borchalos mazra; Armenian: Բորչալուի գավառ, romanized: Borčalowi gavaṙ; Azerbaijani: بورچالی قضاسی, romanized: Borçālı qaz̤āsı) was a county (uezd) of the Tiflis Governorate of the Caucasus Viceroyalty of the Russian Empire, and later of the independent and Soviet republics of Georgia. Its administrative center was the town of Shulavery (present-day Shaumiani). The area of the county roughly corresponded to the contemporary Lori Province of Armenia and the Kvemo Kartli region of Georgia.

== History ==
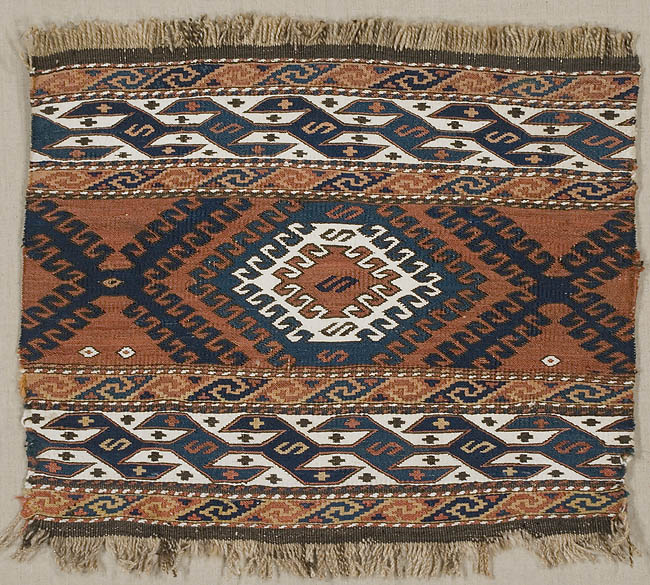
Borchaly Mafrash (bedding bag) textile, late 19th century

The Debed river, formerly known as the Borchala (Russian: Борчала), gave the name of the uezd, however, the region was also known as Borchalo (ბორჩალო) in Georgian, Borchalu (Բորչալու) in Armenian, and Borchali (Azerbaijani: Borçalı) in Azerbaijani. The Turkic locals were resettled to the Debed river valley through the policy of Shah Abbas I (c.1571-1629) after his successful campaigns against the Kingdoms of Kartli and Kakheti that led to the formation of several Qizilbash khanates. The region was later reincorporated into the Kingdom of Kartli in the 18th century, subsequently being incorporated into the Kartli-Kakheti monarchy in 1762. In 1801, through Russia's annexation of eastern Georgia, Borchaly became part of Russia's Georgia Governorate, which was eventually transformed to become the Tiflis Governorate.

Following the Russian Revolution and the short-lived independence of the Democratic Republic of Georgia and the First Republic of Armenia, the Borchaly uezd became the site of a 2-week-war between the two countries in December 1918, until its British-brokered ceasefire starting 1 January 1919. Most of northern Lori centered around Alaverdi was transformed into a neutral zone and patrolled by British troops of the 27th Division, until their mid-1919 withdrawal. Armenian and Georgian troops replaced the British forces in the neutral zone following the latter's withdrawal. The Armenians later complaining that the Georgian force was unsuccessfully trying to convince Tatar and Russian villages in the neutral zone to agree to join Georgia.

In late 1920, the neutral zone of Lori and the southernmost section of the Lori Uchastok which had been annexed to Armenia was with their permission reincorporated into Georgia for the safety of its inhabitants as a result of the Turkish-Armenian War. Georgia continued to administer the reunited Borchaly uezd until its Sovietization and the district's partition between the newly-formed Armenian and Georgian Soviet republics.

== Administrative divisions ==
The subcounties (uchastoks) of the Borchaly uezd in 1913 were as follows:

Name	1912 population	Area
Borchalinskiy uchastok (Борчалинскій участокъ)	33,923	727.97 square versts (828.48 km^{2}; 319.88 mi^{2})
Yekaterinenfeldskiy uchastok (Екатериненфелдьскій участокъ)	23,797	913.64 square versts (1,039.78 km^{2}; 401.46 mi^{2})
Loriyskiy uchastok (Лорійскій участокъ)	45,119	2,182.76 square versts (2,484.12 km^{2}; 959.12 mi^{2})
Trialetskiy uchastok (Тріалетскій участокъ)	53,031	2,212.59 square versts (2,518.07 km^{2}; 972.23 mi^{2})

== Demographics ==
=== 1897 Russian census ===
According to the 1897 Russian Empire census, the Borchaly uezd had a population of 128,587 on 28 January [O.S. 15 January] 1897, including 70,501 men and 58,086 women. The plurality of the population indicated Armenian to be their mother tongue, with significant Tatar, (Note: Before 1918, Azerbaijanis were generally known as "Tatars". This term, employed by the Russians, referred to Turkic-speaking Muslims of the South Caucasus. After 1918, with the establishment of the Azerbaijan Democratic Republic and "especially during the Soviet era", the Tatar group identified itself as "Azerbaijani".) Greek, Russian, and Georgian speaking minorities.

Linguistic composition of the Borchaly uezd in 1897
Language	Native speakers	%
Armenian	47,423	36.88
Tatar	37,742	29.35
Greek	21,393	16.64
Russian	8,089	6.29
Georgian	7,840	6.10
German	2,496	1.94
Ukrainian	1,241	0.97
Ossetian	628	0.49
Polish	264	0.21
Avar-Andean	240	0.19
Turkish	162	0.13
Jewish	153	0.12
Talysh	151	0.12
Persian	121	0.09
Kurdish	108	0.08
Italian	106	0.08
Kyurin	102	0.08
Lithuanian	54	0.04
Kazi-Kumukh	53	0.04
Dargin	27	0.02
Assyrian	19	0.01
Belarusian	19	0.01
Imeretian	17	0.01
Chechen	8	0.01
French	7	0.01
Mingrelian	6	0.00
Chuvash	4	0.00
Latvian	4	0.00
Romanian	3	0.00
Czech	1	0.00
Other	106	0.08
TOTAL	128,587	100.00

=== Kavkazskiy kalendar ===
According to the 1917 publication of Kavkazskiy kalendar, the Borchaly uezd had a population of 169,351 on 14 January [O.S. 1 January] 1916, including 89,040 men and 80,311 women, 160,447 of whom were the permanent population, and 8,904 were temporary residents:

Nationality	Number	%
Armenians	63,702	37.62
Sunni Muslims (Note: Primarily Turco-Tatars.)	33,320	19.68
Asiatic Christians	30,762	18.16
Shia Muslims (Note: Primarily Tatars.)	17,910	10.58
Georgians	10,419	6.15
Russians	8,772	5.18
Other Europeans	3,601	2.13
North Caucasians	366	0.22
Roma	255	0.15
Jews	244	0.14
TOTAL	169,351	100.00

== See also ==
- History of the administrative division of Russia

== Bibliography ==
- Bournoutian, George A. (2018). Armenia and Imperial Decline: The Yerevan Province, 1900–1914. Milton Park, Abingdon, Oxon: Routledge. ISBN 978-1-351-06260-2. OCLC 1037283914.
- Hovannisian, Richard G. (1971). The Republic of Armenia. Vol. 1: The First Year, 1918–1919. Berkeley: University of California Press. ISBN 978-0520019843.
- Кавказский календарь на 1913 год [Caucasian calendar for 1913] (in Russian) (68th ed.). Tiflis: Tipografiya kantselyarii Ye.I.V. na Kavkaze, kazenny dom. 1913. Archived from the original on 19 April 2022.
- Кавказский календарь на 1917 год [Caucasian calendar for 1917] (in Russian) (72nd ed.). Tiflis: Tipografiya kantselyarii Ye.I.V. na Kavkaze, kazenny dom. 1917. Archived from the original on 4 November 2021.
- Tsutsiev, Arthur (2014). Atlas of the Ethno-Political History of the Caucasus (PDF). Translated by Nora Seligman Favorov. New Haven: Yale University Press. ISBN 9780300153088. Archived (PDF) from the original on 17 June 2023.
