= Mid-South Conference (MHSAA) =

Mid South Conference
- Conference: MHSAA
- Commissioner: Lonnie Newland
- Sports fielded: Basketball, Soccer, Volleyball, Track and Field, Golf; men's: 4; women's: 4
- Division: (class) D
- No. of teams: 7
- Headquarters: Marshall, Michigan
- Region: South/Central Michigan

Locations

The Mid-South Conference (MSC) is an athletic conference affiliated with the MHSAA. All schools are Class D (small school). Members are located in Michigan.

== Full members ==
Institution	Location	Affiliation	Nickname	Class	Enrollment	Colors
Rudolf Steiner School	Ann Arbor, Michigan	Private	Storm	D	94	
Calhoun Christian School	Battle Creek, Michigan	Private	Cougars	D	65	
Will Carleton Academy	Hillsdale, Michigan	Public charter school(academy)	Cougars	D	50	
New Covenant Christian	Lansing, Michigan	Private	Warriors	D	19	
Marshall Academy	Marshall, Michigan	Public charter school	Griffons	D	67	
Pansophia Academy	Coldwater, Michigan	Public charter school	Pumas	D	86	
Jackson Preparatory and Early College	Jackson, Michigan	Public charter school	Falcons	C	214	

Note: enrollments taken from 2020-21 MHSAA enrollment listing (grades 9-12)

== Past members ==
Institution	Location	Affiliation	Nickname	Class	Enrollment	Colors	Left Conference
Washtenaw Christian Academy	Saline, Michigan	Private (academy)	Wildcats	D	~500		2008
Hillsdale Academy	Hillsdale, Michigan	Private (academy)	Colts	D	67		2009
Holt Lutheran School*	Holt, Michigan	Private/Lutheran	Hawks	D	25		2012

*It is currently unclear if Holt Lutheran is in the conference due to major staff changes and low enrollment in their athletic programs, because of this they haven't been able to fully participate in most varsity sports.

== Sports ==
The Mid South Conference competes in boys and girls soccer and basketball and girls volleyball. In 2015, teams competed in an inaugural conference cross country meet.
