= Signakh uezd =

Coordinates: 41°37′07″N 45°55′18″E

Signakh uezd Сигнахскій уѣздъ
- Uezd
- Coat of arms

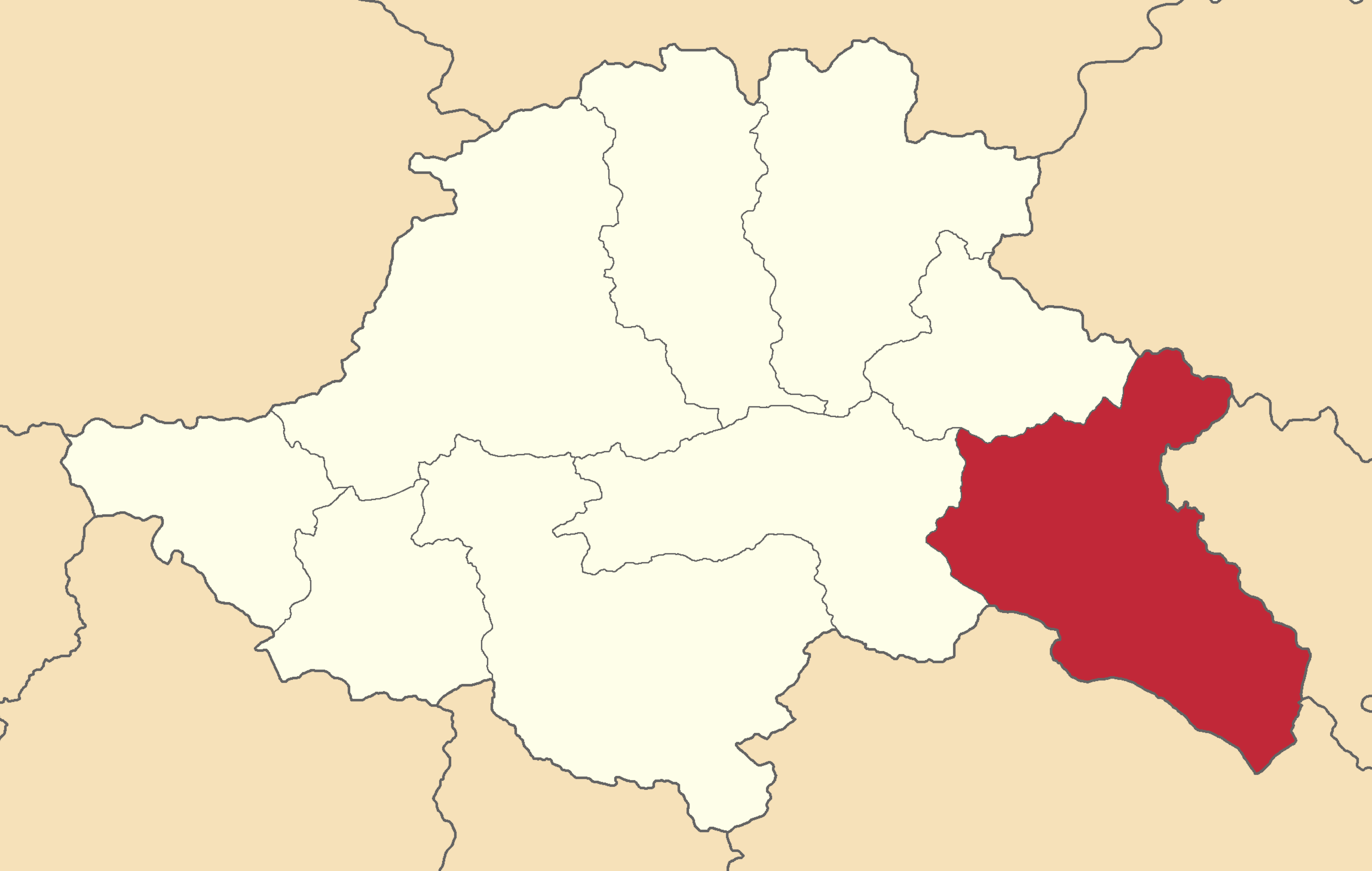
- Location in the Tiflis Governorate
- Country: Russian Empire
- Viceroyalty: Caucasus
- Governorate: Tiflis
- Established: 1801
- Abolished: 1929
- Capital: Signakh (present-day Signagi)

Area
  - Total: 6,022.39 km^{2} (2,325.26 sq mi)

Population (1916)
  - Total: 153,864
  - Density: 25.5487/km^{2} (66.1707/sq mi)
  - Urban: 11.48%
  - Rural: 88.52%

The Signakh uezd (Note: Russian: Сигна́хскій уѣ́здъ, romanized: Signákhsky uyézd; Georgian: სიღნაღის მაზრა, romanized: sighnaghis mazra) was a county (uezd) of the Tiflis Governorate of the Caucasus Viceroyalty of the Russian Empire, and then of Democratic Republic of Georgia, with its administrative centre in Signakh (present-day Signagi). The area of the county corresponded to part of the contemporary Kakheti region of Georgia.

== History ==
Following the Russian Revolution, the Signakh uezd was incorporated into the short-lived Democratic Republic of Georgia.

== Administrative divisions ==
The subcounties (uchastoks) of the Signakh uezd in 1913 were as follows:

| Name | 1912 population | Area |
|---|---|---|
| Bakurtsikhskiy uchastok (Бакурцихскій участокъ) | 23,881 | 1,170.96 square versts (1,332.63 km^{2}; 514.53 mi^{2}) |
| Kodalskiy uchastok (Кодальскій участокъ) | 50,638 | 1,205.14 square versts (1,371.52 km^{2}; 529.55 mi^{2}) |
| Nizhne-Machkhaanskiy uchastok (Нижне-Мачхаанскій участокъ) | 53,588 | 733.29 square versts (834.53 km^{2}; 322.21 mi^{2}) |
| Shirakskiy uchastok (Ширакскій участокъ) | 6,222 | 2,182.40 square versts (2,483.71 km^{2}; 958.96 mi^{2}) |
| Zaalazanskiy raion (Заалазанскій раіонъ) | 12,645 | – |

== Demographics ==
=== 1897 Russian census ===
According to the 1897 Russian Empire census, the Signakh uezd had a population of 102,313 on 28 January [O.S. 15 January] 1897, including 55,958 men and 46,355 women. The majority of the population indicated Georgian to be their mother tongue, with significant Armenian and Tatar (Note: Before 1918, Azerbaijanis were generally known as "Tatars". This term, employed by the Russians, referred to Turkic-speaking Muslims of the South Caucasus. After 1918, with the establishment of the Azerbaijan Democratic Republic and "especially during the Soviet era", the Tatar group identified itself as "Azerbaijani".) speaking minorities.

Linguistic composition of the Signakh uezd in 1897
| Language | Native speakers | % |
|---|---|---|
| Georgian | 84,827 | 82.91 |
| Armenian | 6,392 | 6.25 |
| Tatar | 5,272 | 5.15 |
| Russian | 4,413 | 4.31 |
| Ukrainian | 447 | 0.44 |
| Avar-Andean | 279 | 0.27 |
| Lithuanian | 187 | 0.18 |
| Polish | 126 | 0.12 |
| Jewish | 108 | 0.11 |
| Belarusian | 50 | 0.05 |
| German | 44 | 0.04 |
| Imeretian | 39 | 0.04 |
| Ossetian | 30 | 0.03 |
| Czech | 12 | 0.01 |
| Persian | 11 | 0.01 |
| Kazi-Kumukh | 10 | 0.01 |
| Greek | 8 | 0.01 |
| Mingrelian | 8 | 0.01 |
| Latvian | 6 | 0.01 |
| Dargin | 4 | 0.00 |
| Italian | 1 | 0.00 |
| Kist | 1 | 0.00 |
| Kyurin | 1 | 0.00 |
| Other | 37 | 0.04 |
| TOTAL | 102,313 | 100.00 |

=== Kavkazskiy kalendar ===
According to the 1917 publication of Kavkazskiy kalendar, the Signakh uezd had a population of 153,864 on 14 January [O.S. 1 January] 1916, including 80,670 men and 73,194 women, 148,646 of whom were the permanent population, and 5,218 were temporary residents:

| Nationality | Urban | | Rural | | TOTAL | |
| Nationality | Number | % | Number | % | Number | % |
|---|---|---|---|---|---|---|
| Georgians | 8,493 | 48.09 | 109,790 | 80.61 | 118,283 | 76.88 |
| Armenians | 8,970 | 50.79 | 6,038 | 4.43 | 15,008 | 9.75 |
| Russians | 179 | 1.01 | 11,500 | 8.44 | 11,679 | 7.59 |
| Shia Muslims (Note: Primarily Tatars.) | 0 | 0.00 | 3,275 | 2.40 | 3,275 | 2.13 |
| Asiatic Christians | 0 | 0.00 | 3,201 | 2.35 | 3,201 | 2.08 |
| Sunni Muslims (Note: Primarily Turco-Tatars.) | 0 | 0.00 | 1,862 | 1.37 | 1,862 | 1.21 |
| Jews | 7 | 0.04 | 324 | 0.24 | 331 | 0.22 |
| North Caucasians | 0 | 0.00 | 210 | 0.15 | 210 | 0.14 |
| Other Europeans | 13 | 0.07 | 2 | 0.00 | 15 | 0.01 |
| TOTAL | 17,662 | 100.00 | 136,202 | 100.00 | 153,864 | 100.00 |

== See also ==
- History of the administrative division of Russia

== Bibliography ==
- Bournoutian, George A. (2018). Armenia and Imperial Decline: The Yerevan Province, 1900–1914. Milton Park, Abingdon, Oxon: Routledge. ISBN 978-1-351-06260-2. OCLC 1037283914.
- Hovannisian, Richard G. (1971). The Republic of Armenia. Vol. 1: The First Year, 1918–1919. Berkeley: University of California Press. ISBN 978-0520019843.
- Кавказский календарь на 1913 год [Caucasian calendar for 1913] (in Russian) (68th ed.). Tiflis: Tipografiya kantselyarii Ye.I.V. na Kavkaze, kazenny dom. 1913. Archived from the original on 19 April 2022.
- Кавказский календарь на 1917 год [Caucasian calendar for 1917] (in Russian) (72nd ed.). Tiflis: Tipografiya kantselyarii Ye.I.V. na Kavkaze, kazenny dom. 1917. Archived from the original on 4 November 2021.
- Tsutsiev, Arthur (2014). Atlas of the Ethno-Political History of the Caucasus (PDF). Translated by Nora Seligman Favorov. New Haven: Yale University Press. ISBN 9780300153088. Archived (PDF) from the original on 17 June 2023.
