= Telavi uezd =

Coordinates: 41°55′0″N 45°29′0″E

Telavi uezd Телавскій уѣздъ
- Uezd
- Coat of arms

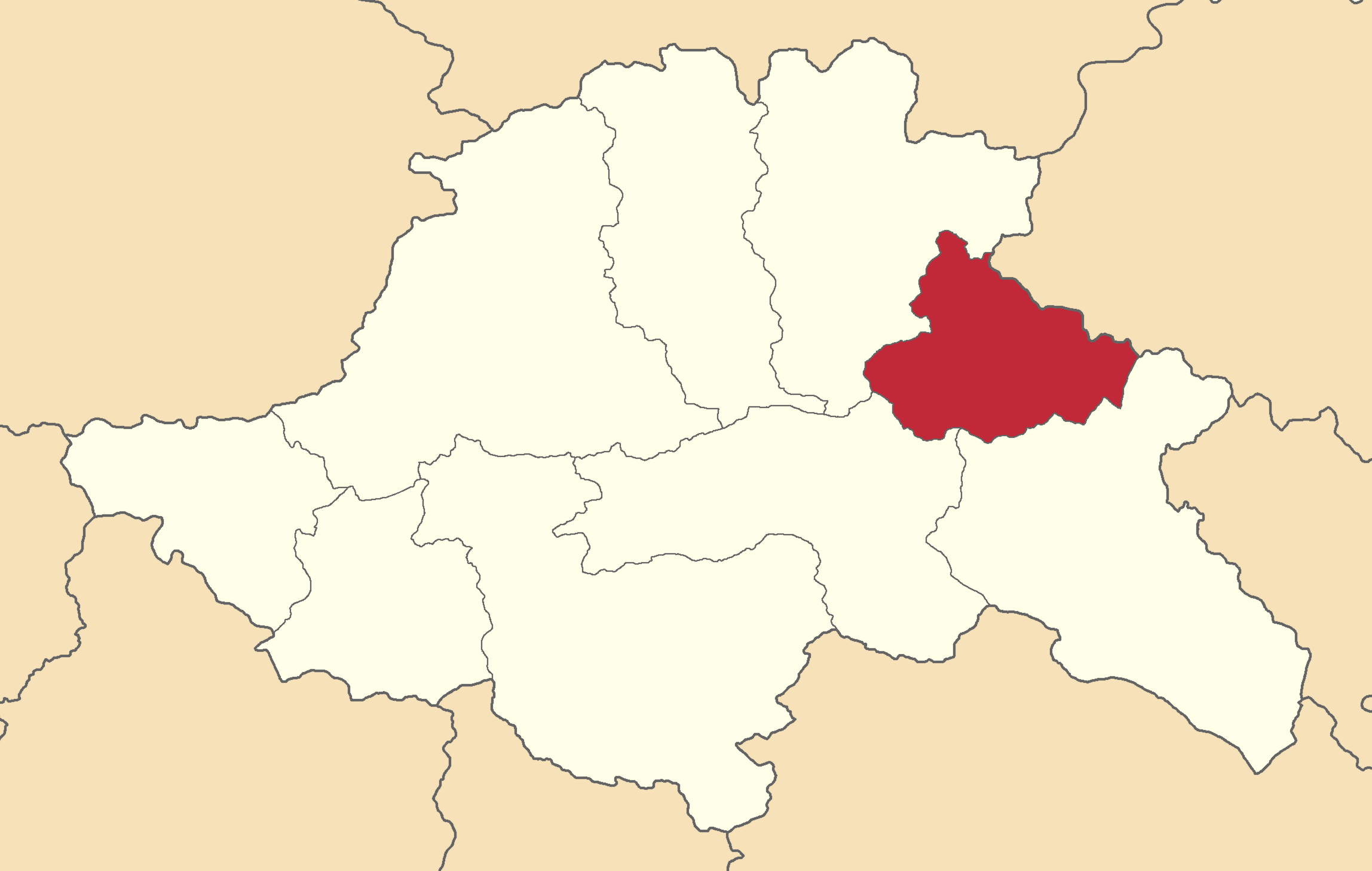
- Location in the Tiflis Governorate
- Country: Russian Empire
- Viceroyalty: Caucasus
- Governorate: Tiflis
- Established: 1801
- Abolished: 1930
- Capital: Telavi

Area
  - Total: 2,461.53 km^{2} (950.40 sq mi)

Population (1916)
  - Total: 67,955
  - Density: 27.607/km^{2} (71.501/sq mi)
  - Urban: 14.75%
  - Rural: 85.25%

The Telavi uezd (Note: Russian: Тела́вскій уѣ́здъ, romanized: Telávsky uyézd; Georgian: თელავის მაზრა, romanized: telavis mazra) was a county (uezd) of the Tiflis Governorate of the Caucasus Viceroyalty of the Russian Empire, and then of Democratic Republic of Georgia, with its administrative center in Telavi. The area of the county corresponded to part of the contemporary Kakheti region of Georgia.

== History ==
Following the Russian Revolution, the Telavi uezd was incorporated into the short-lived Democratic Republic of Georgia.

== Administrative divisions ==
The subcounties (uchastoks) of the Telavi uezd in 1913 were as follows:

Name	1912 population	Area
Kvarelskiy uchastok (Кварельскій участокъ)	23,201	1,336.08 square versts (1,520.54 km^{2}; 587.08 mi^{2})
Tsinondalskiy uchastok (Цинондальскій участокъ)	29,869	826.83 square versts (940.98 km^{2}; 363.32 mi^{2})

== Demographics ==
=== 1897 Russian census ===
According to the 1897 Russian Empire census, the Telavi uezd had a population of 66,767 on 28 January [O.S. 15 January] 1897, including 35,895 men and 30,872 women. The majority of the population indicated Georgian to be their mother tongue, with a significant Armenian speaking minority.

Linguistic composition of the Telavi uezd in 1897
Language	Native speakers	%
Georgian	57,357	85.91
Armenian	4,754	7.12
Tatar (Note: Before 1918, Azerbaijanis were generally known as "Tatars". This term, employed by the Russians, referred to Turkic-speaking Muslims of the South Caucasus. After 1918, with the establishment of the Azerbaijan Democratic Republic and "especially during the Soviet era", the Tatar group identified itself as "Azerbaijani".)	1,873	2.81
Avar-Andean	1,752	2.62
Russian	694	1.04
Ossetian	88	0.13
Imeretian	74	0.11
German	34	0.05
Jewish	24	0.04
Ukrainian	23	0.03
Kazi-Kumukh	19	0.03
Persian	17	0.03
Polish	17	0.03
Dargin	8	0.01
Greek	7	0.01
Turkish	5	0.01
French	4	0.01
Assyrian	2	0.00
Belarusian	2	0.00
Chechen	2	0.00
Kyurin	1	0.00
Kist	1	0.00
Latvian	1	0.00
Lithuanian	1	0.00
Other	7	0.01
TOTAL	66,767	100.00

=== Kavkazskiy kalendar ===
According to the 1917 publication of Kavkazskiy kalendar, the Telavi uezd had a population of 67,955 on 14 January [O.S. 1 January] 1916, including 36,276 men and 31,679 women, 65,422 of whom were the permanent population, and 2,533 were temporary residents:

Nationality	Urban		Rural		TOTAL	
Nationality	Number	%	Number	%	Number	%
Georgians	2,757	27.50	54,221	93.60	56,978	83.85
Armenians	7,068	70.50	1,412	2.44	8,480	12.48
North Caucasians	8	0.08	1,300	2.24	1,308	1.92
Asiatic Christians	0	0.00	873	1.51	873	1.28
Russians	135	1.35	105	0.18	240	0.35
Other Europeans	22	0.22	18	0.03	40	0.06
Jews	22	0.22	0	0.00	22	0.03
Sunni Muslims (Note: Primarily Turco-Tatars.)	14	0.14	0	0.00	14	0.02
TOTAL	10,026	100.00	57,929	100.00	67,955	100.00

== See also ==
- History of the administrative division of Russia

== Bibliography ==
- Bournoutian, George A. (2018). Armenia and Imperial Decline: The Yerevan Province, 1900–1914. Milton Park, Abingdon, Oxon: Routledge. ISBN 978-1-351-06260-2. OCLC 1037283914.
- Hovannisian, Richard G. (1971). The Republic of Armenia. Vol. 1: The First Year, 1918–1919. Berkeley: University of California Press. ISBN 978-0520019843.
- Кавказский календарь на 1913 год [Caucasian calendar for 1913] (in Russian) (68th ed.). Tiflis: Tipografiya kantselyarii Ye.I.V. na Kavkaze, kazenny dom. 1913. Archived from the original on 19 April 2022.
- Кавказский календарь на 1917 год [Caucasian calendar for 1917] (in Russian) (72nd ed.). Tiflis: Tipografiya kantselyarii Ye.I.V. na Kavkaze, kazenny dom. 1917. Archived from the original on 4 November 2021.
- Tsutsiev, Arthur (2014). Atlas of the Ethno-Political History of the Caucasus (PDF). Translated by Nora Seligman Favorov. New Haven: Yale University Press. ISBN 9780300153088. Archived (PDF) from the original on 17 June 2023.
