= Main Intelligence Directorate =

Main Intelligence Directorate may refer to:

- GRU (Russian Federation), the foreign military intelligence agency of the Russian Armed Forces
- Main Intelligence Directorate (Soviet Union), the foreign military intelligence agency of the Soviet Army
- Main Directorate of Intelligence (Ukraine), the military intelligence service of Ukraine
