= Georgian Governorate =

Governorate of the Russian Empire

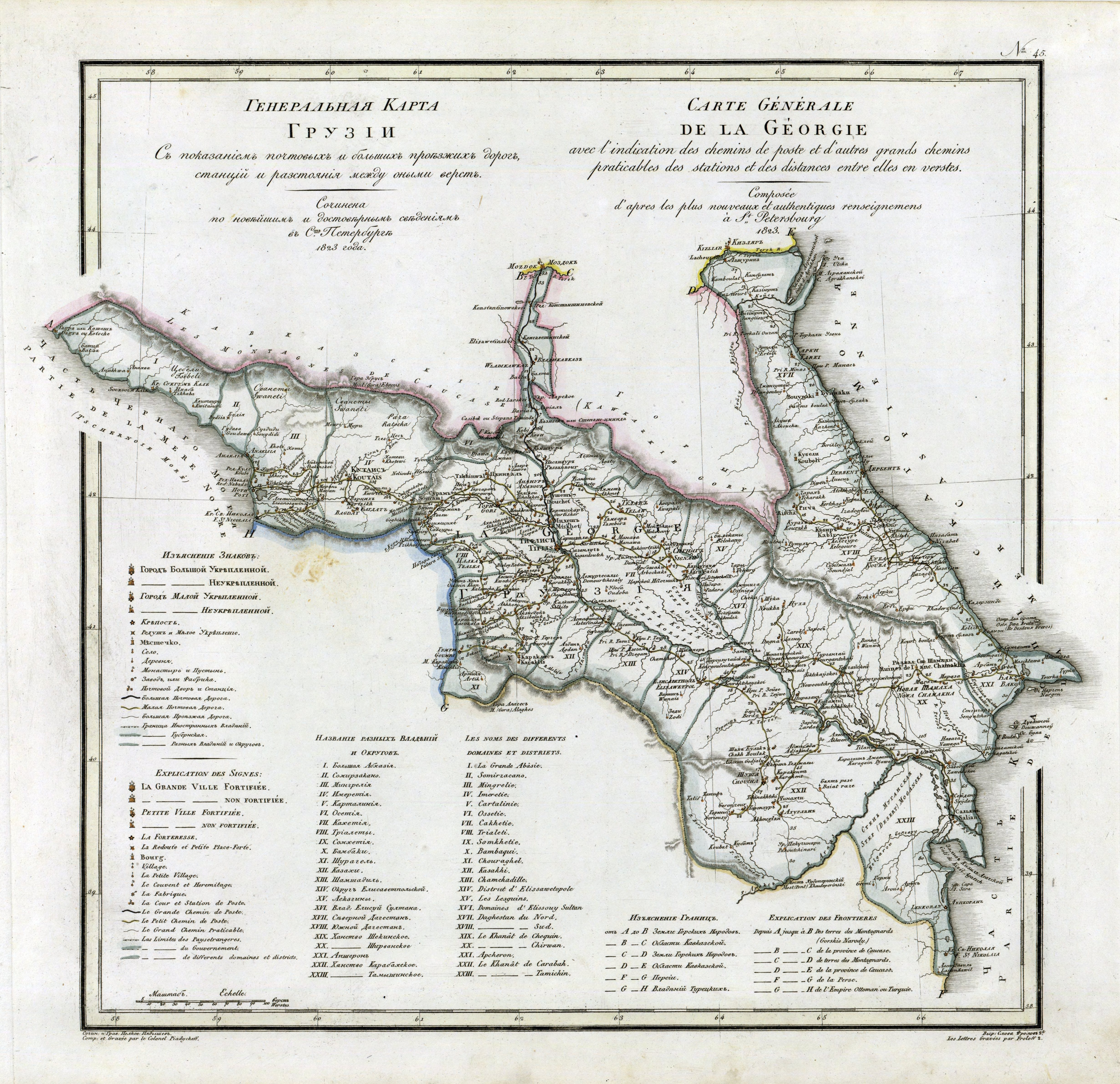
Georgian Governorate, 1823

The Georgian Governorate (Russian: Грузинская губерния; Georgian: საქართველოს გუბერნია) was one of the guberniyas of the Caucasus Viceroyalty of the Russian Empire. Its capital was Tiflis (Tbilisi). It was divided into uyezds of Gori, Dusheti (Its center was Tbilisi), Lori, Signagi and Telavi.

The Georgia governorate was established in 1801 following the Russian annexation of the Kingdom of Kartli-Kakheti. In 1840 it was expanded to form the Georgia-Imeretia Governorate, incorporating the territory of the Imeretia Oblast (Its center was Kutaisi and was constituted from uyezds of Kutaisi, Vakha, Rakvta (Raczyn during Russian rule), Sachkhere, Cheri and Bagdati) and Armenian Oblast (Its center was Erivan).
