= Gori uezd =

Coordinates: 41°58′0″N 44°06′0″E

Gori uezd Горійскій уѣздъ
- Uezd
- Coat of arms

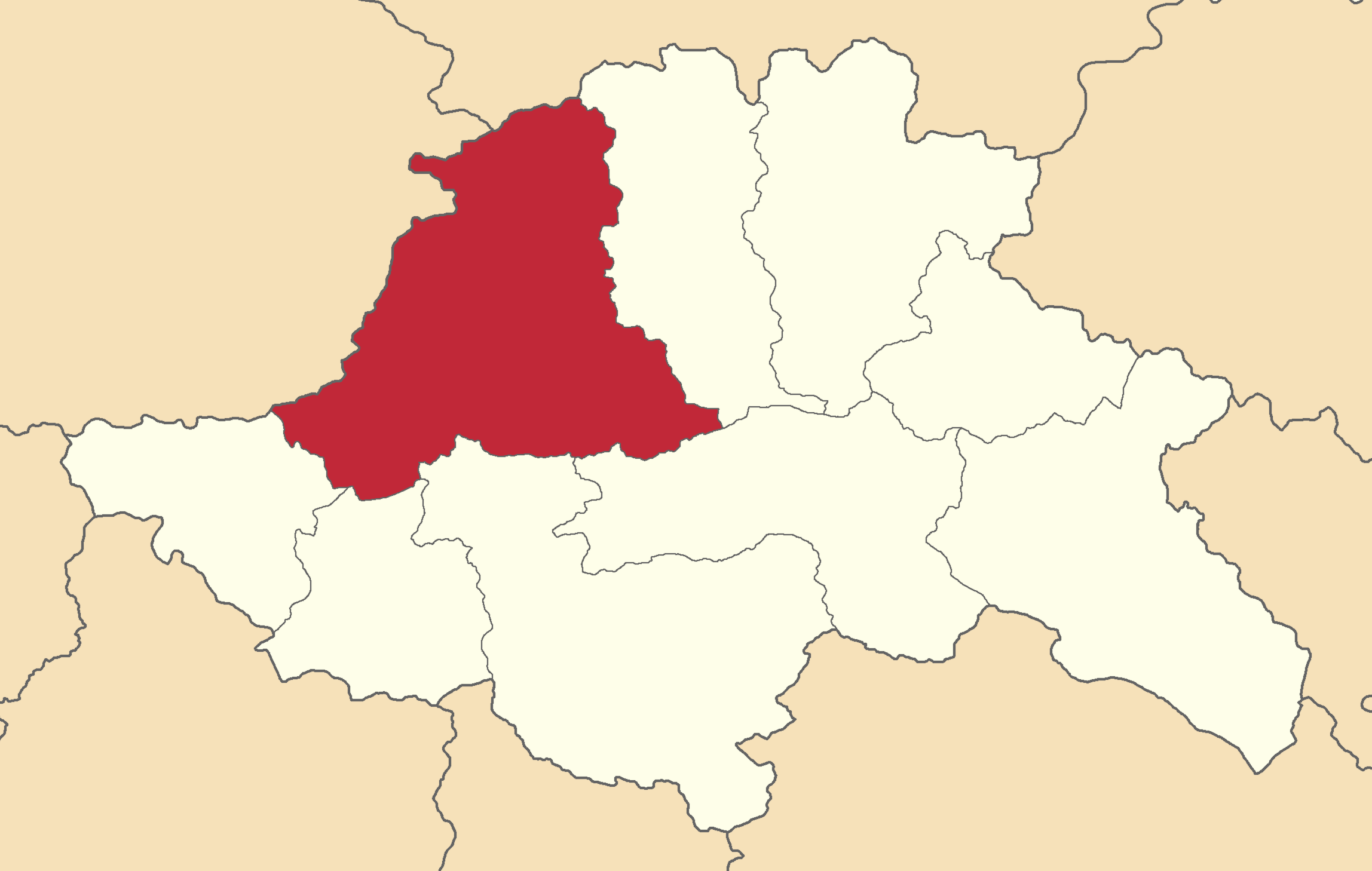
- Location in the Tiflis Governorate
- Country: Russian Empire
- Viceroyalty: Caucasus
- Governorate: Tiflis
- Established: 1801
- Abolished: 1930
- Capital: Gori

Area
  - Total: 6,836.98 km^{2} (2,639.77 sq mi)

Population (1916)
  - Total: 241,016
  - Density: 35.2518/km^{2} (91.3018/sq mi)
  - Urban: 7.66%
  - Rural: 92.34%

The Gori uezd (Note: Russian: Го́рійскій уѣ́здъ, romanized: Góriysky uyézd; Georgian: გორის მაზრა, romanized: goris mazra) was a county (uezd) of the Tiflis Governorate of the Caucasus Viceroyalty of the Russian Empire, and then of Democratic Republic of Georgia, with its administrative center in Gori. The area of the county roughly corresponded to the contemporary Shida Kartli region of Georgia.

== History ==
Following the Russian Revolution, the Gori uezd was incorporated into the short-lived Democratic Republic of Georgia.

== Administrative divisions ==
The subcounties (uchastoks) of the Gori uezd in 1913 were as follows:

Name	1912 population
Akhalkalakskiy uchastok (Ахалкалакскій участокъ)	27,765
Borzhomskiy uchastok (Боржомскій участокъ)	9,284
Gomskiy uchastok (Гомскій участокъ)	19,868
Gorno-Osetinskiy uchastok (Горио-Осетинскій участокъ)	23,933
Karelskiy uchastok (Карельскій участокъ)	22,982
Kvemo-Chalskiy uchastok (Квемо-Чалскій участокъ)	14,216
Medzhviskhevskiy uchastok (Меджвисхевскій участокъ)	23,770
Suramskiy uchastok (Сурамскій участокъ)	12,351
Tskhinvalskiy uchastok (Цхинвальскій участокъ)	31,953

== Demographics ==
=== 1897 Russian census ===
According to the Russian Empire census, the Gori uezd had a population of 191,091 on 28 January [O.S. 15 January] 1897, including 102,837 men and 88,254 women. The majority of the population indicated Georgian to be their mother tongue, with a significant Ossetian speaking minority.

Linguistic composition of the Gori uezd in 1897
Language	Native speakers	%
Georgian	124,180	64.98
Ossetian	50,036	26.18
Armenian	7,686	4.02
Russian	5,281	2.76
Greek	917	0.48
Jewish	874	0.46
Tatar (Note: Before 1918, Azerbaijanis were generally known as "Tatars". This term, employed by the Russians, referred to Turkic-speaking Muslims of the South Caucasus. After 1918, with the establishment of the Azerbaijan Democratic Republic and "especially during the Soviet era", the Tatar group identified itself as "Azerbaijani".)	432	0.23
Imeretian	393	0.21
Ukrainian	335	0.18
Mingrelian	233	0.12
Polish	218	0.11
German	197	0.10
Assyrian	64	0.03
Turkish	38	0.02
Avar-Andean	30	0.02
Czech	20	0.01
Dargin	19	0.01
Kyurin	16	0.01
Persian	15	0.01
Lithuanian	14	0.01
Latvian	13	0.01
Chechen	12	0.01
Belarusian	7	0.00
Romanian	4	0.00
Italian	2	0.00
Kurdish	1	0.00
Other	54	0.03
TOTAL	191,091	100.00

=== Kavkazskiy kalendar ===
According to the 1917 publication of Kavkazskiy kalendar, the Gori uezd had a population of 241,016 on 14 January [O.S. 1 January] 1916, including 124,658 men and 116,358 women, 226,436 of whom were the permanent population, and 14,580 were temporary residents:

Nationality	Urban		Rural		TOTAL	
Nationality	Number	%	Number	%	Number	%
Georgians	9,580	51.91	152,846	68.68	162,426	67.39
North Caucasians	0	0.00	37,567	16.88	37,567	15.59
Armenians	7,270	39.40	25,552	11.48	32,822	13.62
Jews	104	0.56	3,998	1.80	4,102	1.70
Russians	1,377	7.46	1,030	0.46	2,407	1.00
Asiatic Christians	0	0.00	1,450	0.65	1,450	0.60
Shia Muslims (Note: Primarily Tatars.)	22	0.12	116	0.05	138	0.06
Other Europeans	65	0.35	3	0.00	68	0.03
Sunni Muslims (Note: Primarily Turco-Tatars.)	36	0.20	0	0.00	36	0.01
TOTAL	18,454	100.00	222,562	100.00	241,016	100.00

== See also ==
- History of the administrative division of Russia

== Bibliography ==
- Bournoutian, George A. (2018). Armenia and Imperial Decline: The Yerevan Province, 1900–1914. Milton Park, Abingdon, Oxon: Routledge. ISBN 978-1-351-06260-2. OCLC 1037283914.
- Hovannisian, Richard G. (1971). The Republic of Armenia. Vol. 1: The First Year, 1918–1919. Berkeley: University of California Press. ISBN 978-0520019843.
- Кавказский календарь на 1913 год [Caucasian calendar for 1913] (in Russian) (68th ed.). Tiflis: Tipografiya kantselyarii Ye.I.V. na Kavkaze, kazenny dom. 1913. Archived from the original on 19 April 2022.
- Кавказский календарь на 1917 год [Caucasian calendar for 1917] (in Russian) (72nd ed.). Tiflis: Tipografiya kantselyarii Ye.I.V. na Kavkaze, kazenny dom. 1917. Archived from the original on 4 November 2021.
- Tsutsiev, Arthur (2014). Atlas of the Ethno-Political History of the Caucasus (PDF). Translated by Nora Seligman Favorov. New Haven: Yale University Press. ISBN 9780300153088. Archived (PDF) from the original on 17 June 2023.
